= Saint-Aubin =

Saint-Aubin (French for "Saint Albinus") may refer to:

== People ==
- Charles Germain de Saint Aubin (1721 – 1786), French draftsman and embroidery designer to King Louis XV
- Gabriel de Saint-Aubin (1724 – 1780), French draftsman, printmaker, etcher and painter
- Helen Callaghan St. Aubin (1923 – 1992), American baseball player
- Lisa St Aubin de Terán (b. 1953), English novelist
- Edward St Aubyn (b. 1960), English novelist

== Places ==
=== France ===
- Château Saint-Aubin, in the Gironde département
- Saint-Aubin, Aisne, in the Aisne département
- Saint-Aubin, Aube, in the Aube département
- Saint-Aubin, Côte-d'Or, in the Côte-d'Or département
- Saint-Aubin, Essonne, in the Essonne département
- Saint-Aubin, Indre, in the Indre département
- Saint-Aubin, Jura, in the Jura département
- Saint-Aubin, Landes, in the Landes département
- Saint-Aubin, Lot-et-Garonne, in the Lot-et-Garonne département
- Saint-Aubin, Nord, in the Nord département
- Saint-Aubin, Pas-de-Calais, in the Pas-de-Calais département
- Saint-Aubin-Celloville, in the Seine-Maritime département
- Saint-Aubin-Château-Neuf, in the Yonne département
- Saint-Aubin-d'Appenai, in the Orne département
- Saint-Aubin-d'Arquenay, in the Calvados département
- Saint-Aubin-d'Aubigné, in the Ille-et-Vilaine département
- Saint-Aubin-de-Blaye, in the Gironde département
- Saint-Aubin-de-Bonneval, in the Orne département
- Saint-Aubin-de-Branne, in the Gironde département
- Saint-Aubin-de-Cadelech, in the Dordogne département
- Saint-Aubin-de-Courteraie, in the Orne département
- Saint-Aubin-de-Crétot, in the Seine-Maritime département
- Saint-Aubin-d'Écrosville, in the Eure département
- Saint-Aubin-de-Lanquais, in the Dordogne département
- Saint-Aubin-de-Locquenay, in the Sarthe département
- Saint-Aubin-de-Luigné, in the Maine-et-Loire département
- Saint-Aubin-de-Médoc, in the Gironde département
- Saint-Aubin-de-Nabirat, in the Dordogne département
- Saint-Aubin-des-Bois, Calvados, in the Calvados département
- Saint-Aubin-des-Bois, Eure-et-Loir, in the Eure-et-Loir département
- Saint-Aubin-de-Scellon, in the Eure département
- Saint-Aubin-des-Landes, in the Ille-et-Vilaine département
- Saint-Aubin-des-Ormeaux, in the Vendée département
- Saint-Aubin-des-Préaux, in the Manche département
- Saint-Aubin-de-Terregatte, in the Manche département
- Saint-Aubin-du-Cormier, in the Ille-et-Vilaine département
- Saint-Aubin-du-Désert, in the Mayenne département
- Saint-Aubin-du-Pavail, in the Ille-et-Vilaine département
- Saint-Aubin-du-Perron, in the Manche département
- Saint-Aubin-du-Plain, in the Deux-Sèvres département
- Saint-Aubin-du-Thenney, in the Eure département
- Saint-Aubin-en-Bray, in the Oise département
- Saint-Aubin-en-Charollais, in the Saône-et-Loire département
- Saint-Aubin-Épinay, in the Seine-Maritime département
- Saint-Aubin-Fosse-Louvain, in the Mayenne département
- Saint-Aubin-la-Plaine, in the Vendée département
- Saint-Aubin-le-Cauf, in the Seine-Maritime département
- Saint-Aubin-le-Cloud, in the s Deux-Sèvres département
- Saint-Aubin-le-Dépeint, in the Indre-et-Loire département
- Saint-Aubin-le-Guichard, in the Eure département
- Saint-Aubin-le-Monial, in the Allier département
- Saint-Aubin-lès-Elbeuf, in the a Seine-Maritime département
- Saint-Aubin-les-Forges, in the Nièvre département
- Saint-Aubin-le-Vertueux, in the Eure département
- Saint-Aubin-Montenoy, in the Somme département
- Saint-Aubin-Rivière, in the Somme département
- Saint-Aubin-Routot, in the Seine-Maritime département
- Saint-Aubin-sous-Erquery, in the Oise département
- Saint-Aubin-sur-Aire, in the Meuse département
- Saint-Aubin-sur-Gaillon, in the Eure département
- Saint-Aubin-sur-Loire, in the Saône-et-Loire département
- Saint-Aubin-sur-Mer, Seine-Maritime, in the Seine-Maritime département
- Saint-Aubin-sur-Mer, Calvados, in the Calvados département
- Saint-Aubin-sur-Quillebeuf, in the Eure département
- Saint-Aubin-sur-Scie, in the Seine-Maritime département
- Saint-Aubin-sur-Yonne, in the Yonne département

=== Jersey ===
- Saint Aubin, Jersey in the parish of St Brélade
  - St Aubin railway station

=== Mauritius ===
- Saint Aubin, Mauritius, a village in the district of Savanne, Mauritius

=== Switzerland ===
- Saint Aubin, Fribourg, in the Canton of Fribourg
- Saint-Aubin-Sauges, in the Canton of Neuchâtel

== Other uses ==
- Basilica of San Albino, Mesilla, New Mexico, U.S.A.
- Saint-Aubin wine, from the commune of Saint-Aubin, Côte-d'Or
