= Saint-Léon-d'Issigeac =

- Commune
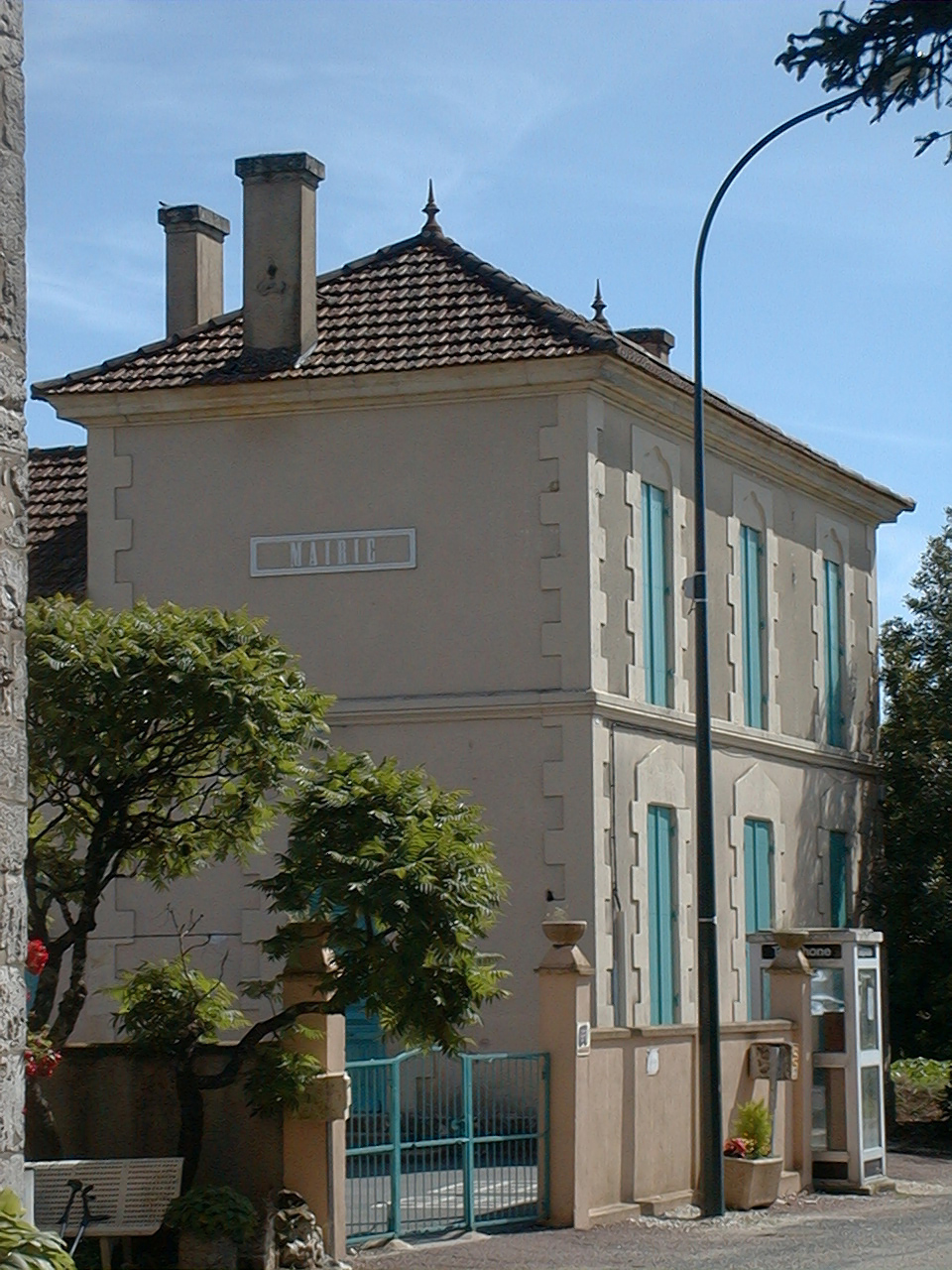
- Town hall
- Location of Saint-Léon-d'Issigeac
- Location within France Location within Nouvelle-Aquitaine
- Coordinates: 44°43′15″N 0°41′31″E
- Country: France
- Region: Nouvelle-Aquitaine
- Department: Dordogne
- Arrondissement: Bergerac
- Canton: Sud-Bergeracois

Government
  - Mayor (2020–2026): Gérard Simon
- Area^{1}: 5.68 km^{2} (2.19 sq mi)
- Elevation: 147 m (482 ft)
- Highest elevation: 162 m (531 ft)
- Lowest elevation: 88 m (289 ft)
- Population (2023): 147
  - Density: 25.9/km^{2} (67.0/sq mi)
- Time zone: UTC+01:00 (CET)
  - Summer (DST): UTC+02:00 (CEST)
- INSEE/Postal code: 24441 /24560
- ^{1} French Land Register data, which excludes lakes, ponds, glaciers > 1 km^{2} (0.386 sq mi or 247 acres) and river estuaries.

Saint-Léon-d'Issigeac (French pronunciation: [sɛ̃ leɔ̃ disiʒak], literally Saint-Léon of Issigeac; Languedocien: Sent Leu de Sijac) is a commune in the Dordogne department in Nouvelle-Aquitaine in southwestern France.

== Population ==
Historical population
Year	Pop.	±% p.a.
1968	137	—
1975	114	−2.59%
1982	105	−1.17%
1990	119	+1.58%
1999	121	+0.19%
2007	118	−0.31%
2012	114	−0.69%
2017	126	+2.02%
2023	147	+2.60%
Source: INSEE

== See also ==
- Communes of the Dordogne department
