= Samueli Naulu =

Fijian rugby union footballer (1982–2013)

- Born: 5 January 1982 Nadi, Fiji
- Died: 30 March 2013 (aged 31) Issigeac, France
- Height: 1.94 m (6 ft 4 in)
- Weight: 116 kg (18 st 4 lb)

Rugby union career
- Position: Wing
- Correct as of 2007
Senior career
Years	Team	Apps	(Points)
2005–2010	USA Perpignan		
International career
Years	Team	Apps	(Points)
- Fiji

Samueli Dawai Naulu (5 January 1982 – 30 March 2013) was a Fijian rugby union footballer. He was born in Narewa, Nadi. He played as a wing. He played for the USA Perpignan team in the Heineken Cup as well as playing for the same team in the French Top 14 Competition.

Samueli was 1.94 m (6 ft 4 in) tall and weighed 116 kilograms (18 st 4 lb). When he joined Perpignan he used to play as a flanker but because the coach thought he would make a good winger he was trialled at the wing. He became USA Perpignan's first choice winger after joining the side after playing Rugby league.

He died on 30 March 2013 after his car collided with a tree in around 5am, 20 km south of Bergerac in Issigeac, France.
