= Saint-Perdoux =

Saint-Perdoux may refer to the following places in France:

- Saint-Perdoux, Dordogne, a commune in the Dordogne department
- Saint-Perdoux, Lot, a commune in the Lot department
