= Razac-d'Eymet =

- Commune
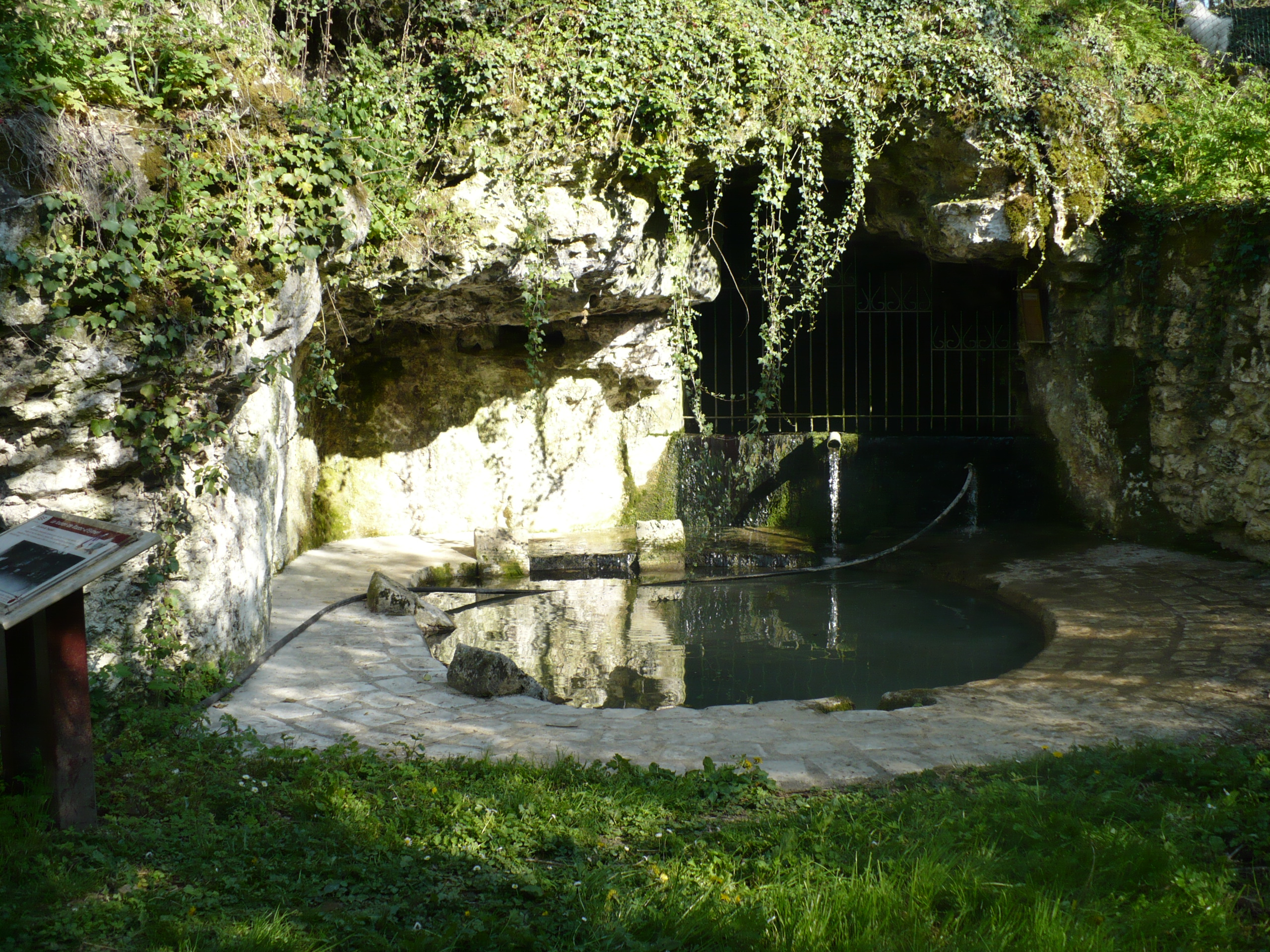
- Location of Razac-d'Eymet
- Location within France Location within Nouvelle-Aquitaine
- Coordinates: 44°41′34″N 0°27′31″E
- Country: France
- Region: Nouvelle-Aquitaine
- Department: Dordogne
- Arrondissement: Bergerac
- Canton: Sud-Bergeracois

Government
  - Mayor (2020–2026): Thierry Grossoleil
- Area^{1}: 12.28 km^{2} (4.74 sq mi)
- Elevation: 120 m (390 ft)
- Highest elevation: 170 m (560 ft)
- Lowest elevation: 48 m (157 ft)
- Population (2023): 328
  - Density: 26.7/km^{2} (69.2/sq mi)
- Time zone: UTC+01:00 (CET)
  - Summer (DST): UTC+02:00 (CEST)
- INSEE/Postal code: 24348 /24500
- ^{1} French Land Register data, which excludes lakes, ponds, glaciers > 1 km^{2} (0.386 sq mi or 247 acres) and river estuaries.

Razac-d'Eymet (French pronunciation: [ʁazak demɛ], literally Razac of Eymet; Occitan: Rasac d'Aimet) is a commune in the Dordogne department in Nouvelle-Aquitaine in southwestern France.

== Population ==
Historical population
Year	Pop.	±% p.a.
1968	335	—
1975	281	−2.48%
1982	288	+0.35%
1990	266	−0.99%
1999	282	+0.65%
2007	281	−0.04%
2012	307	+1.79%
2017	289	−1.20%
2023	328	+2.13%
Source: INSEE

== See also ==
- Communes of the Dordogne department
