= Arrondissement of Bergerac =

Coordinates: 44.85°N 0.48°E

Bergerac
- Arrondissement
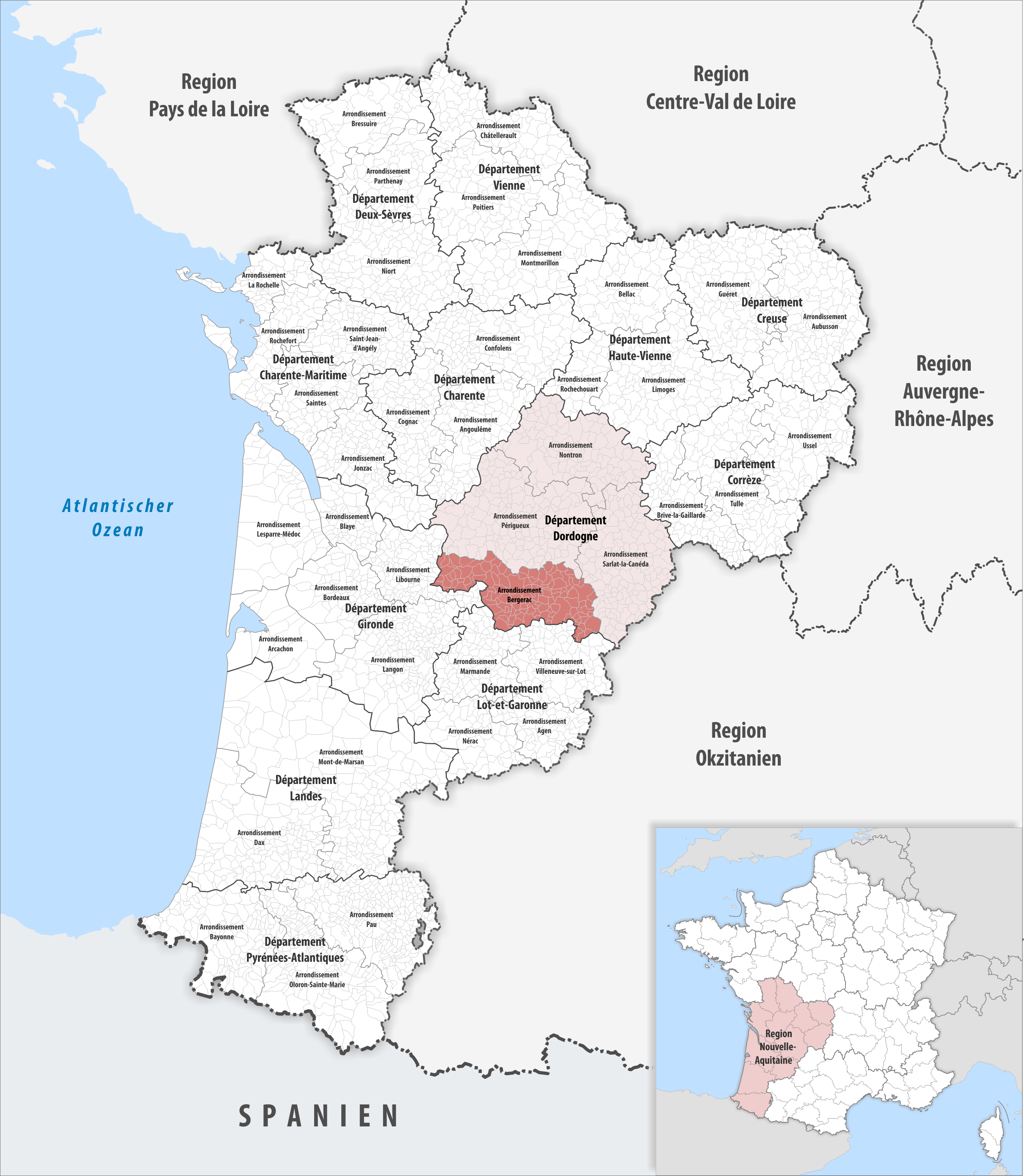
- Location within the region Nouvelle-Aquitaine
- Country: France
- Region: Nouvelle-Aquitaine
- Department: Dordogne
- No. of communes: {{{nbcomm}}}
- Area: 1,819.9 km^{2} (702.7 sq mi)
- Population (2023): 103,849
  - Density: 57.063/km^{2} (147.79/sq mi)
- INSEE code: 241

The arrondissement of Bergerac is an arrondissement of France in the Dordogne department in the Nouvelle-Aquitaine region. It has 130 communes. Its population is 102,530 (2021), and its area is 1,819.9 km^{2} (702.7 sq mi).

== Composition ==
The communes in the arrondissement of Bergerac, and their INSEE codes, are:

1. Alles-sur-Dordogne (24005)
2. Badefols-sur-Dordogne (24022)
3. Baneuil (24023)
4. Bardou (24024)
5. Bayac (24027)
6. Beaumontois-en-Périgord (24028)
7. Bergerac (24037)
8. Biron (24043)
9. Boisse (24045)
10. Bonneville-et-Saint-Avit-de-Fumadières (24048)
11. Bosset (24051)
12. Bouillac (24052)
13. Bouniagues (24054)
14. Bourniquel (24060)
15. Le Buisson-de-Cadouin (24068)
16. Calès (24073)
17. Capdrot (24080)
18. Carsac-de-Gurson (24083)
19. Cause-de-Clérans (24088)
20. Colombier (24126)
21. Conne-de-Labarde (24132)
22. Cours-de-Pile (24140)
23. Couze-et-Saint-Front (24143)
24. Creysse (24145)
25. Cunèges (24148)
26. Eymet (24167)
27. Faurilles (24176)
28. Faux-en-Périgord (24177)
29. Le Fleix (24182)
30. Fonroque (24186)
31. La Force (24222)
32. Fougueyrolles (24189)
33. Fraisse (24191)
34. Gageac-et-Rouillac (24193)
35. Gardonne (24194)
36. Gaugeac (24195)
37. Ginestet (24197)
38. Issigeac (24212)
39. Lalinde (24223)
40. Lamonzie-Montastruc (24224)
41. Lamonzie-Saint-Martin (24225)
42. Lamothe-Montravel (24226)
43. Lanquais (24228)
44. Lavalade (24231)
45. Lembras (24237)
46. Liorac-sur-Louyre (24242)
47. Lolme (24244)
48. Lunas (24246)
49. Marsalès (24257)
50. Mauzac-et-Grand-Castang (24260)
51. Mescoules (24267)
52. Minzac (24272)
53. Molières (24273)
54. Monbazillac (24274)
55. Monestier (24276)
56. Monfaucon (24277)
57. Monmadalès (24278)
58. Monmarvès (24279)
59. Monpazier (24280)
60. Monsac (24281)
61. Monsaguel (24282)
62. Montaut (24287)
63. Montazeau (24288)
64. Montcaret (24289)
65. Montferrand-du-Périgord (24290)
66. Montpeyroux (24292)
67. Mouleydier (24296)
68. Nastringues (24306)
69. Naussannes (24307)
70. Pezuls (24327)
71. Plaisance (24168)
72. Pomport (24331)
73. Pontours (24334)
74. Port-Sainte-Foy-et-Ponchapt (24335)
75. Pressignac-Vicq (24338)
76. Prigonrieux (24340)
77. Queyssac (24345)
78. Rampieux (24347)
79. Razac-d'Eymet (24348)
80. Razac-de-Saussignac (24349)
81. Ribagnac (24351)
82. Rouffignac-de-Sigoulès (24357)
83. Sadillac (24359)
84. Saint-Agne (24361)
85. Saint-Antoine-de-Breuilh (24370)
86. Saint-Aubin-de-Cadelech (24373)
87. Saint-Aubin-de-Lanquais (24374)
88. Saint-Avit-Rivière (24378)
89. Saint-Avit-Sénieur (24379)
90. Saint-Capraise-de-Lalinde (24382)
91. Saint-Capraise-d'Eymet (24383)
92. Saint-Cassien (24384)
93. Saint-Cernin-de-Labarde (24385)
94. Sainte-Croix (24393)
95. Sainte-Foy-de-Longas (24407)
96. Sainte-Radegonde (24492)
97. Saint-Félix-de-Villadeix (24405)
98. Saint-Georges-Blancaneix (24413)
99. Saint-Géraud-de-Corps (24415)
100. Saint-Germain-et-Mons (24419)
101. Saint-Géry (24420)
102. Saint-Julien-Innocence-Eulalie (24423)
103. Saint-Laurent-des-Vignes (24437)
104. Saint-Léon-d'Issigeac (24441)
105. Saint-Marcel-du-Périgord (24445)
106. Saint-Marcory (24446)
107. Saint-Martin-de-Gurson (24454)
108. Saint-Méard-de-Gurçon (24461)
109. Saint-Michel-de-Montaigne (24466)
110. Saint-Nexans (24472)
111. Saint-Perdoux (24483)
112. Saint-Pierre-d'Eyraud (24487)
113. Saint-Rémy (24494)
114. Saint-Romain-de-Monpazier (24495)
115. Saint-Sauveur (24499)
116. Saint-Seurin-de-Prats (24501)
117. Saint-Vivien (24514)
118. Saussignac (24523)
119. Serres-et-Montguyard (24532)
120. Sigoulès-et-Flaugeac (24534)
121. Singleyrac (24536)
122. Soulaures (24542)
123. Thénac (24549)
124. Trémolat (24558)
125. Urval (24560)
126. Varennes (24566)
127. Vélines (24568)
128. Verdon (24570)
129. Vergt-de-Biron (24572)
130. Villefranche-de-Lonchat (24584)

== History ==
The arrondissement of Bergerac was created in 1800. The population was 118,304 by 1841 and there were 13 cantons and 187 communes.

At the January 2017 reorganisation of the arrondissements of Dordogne, it lost 21 communes to the arrondissement of Périgueux and one commune to the arrondissement of Sarlat-la-Canéda.

As a result of the reorganisation of the cantons of France which came into effect in 2015, the borders of the cantons are no longer related to the borders of the arrondissements. The cantons of the arrondissement of Bergerac were, as of January 2015:

1. Beaumont-du-Périgord
2. Bergerac-1
3. Bergerac-2
4. Le Buisson-de-Cadouin
5. Eymet
6. La Force
7. Issigeac
8. Lalinde
9. Monpazier
10. Sainte-Alvère
11. Sigoulès
12. Vélines
13. Villamblard
14. Villefranche-de-Lonchat
