= Boisse =

- Commune
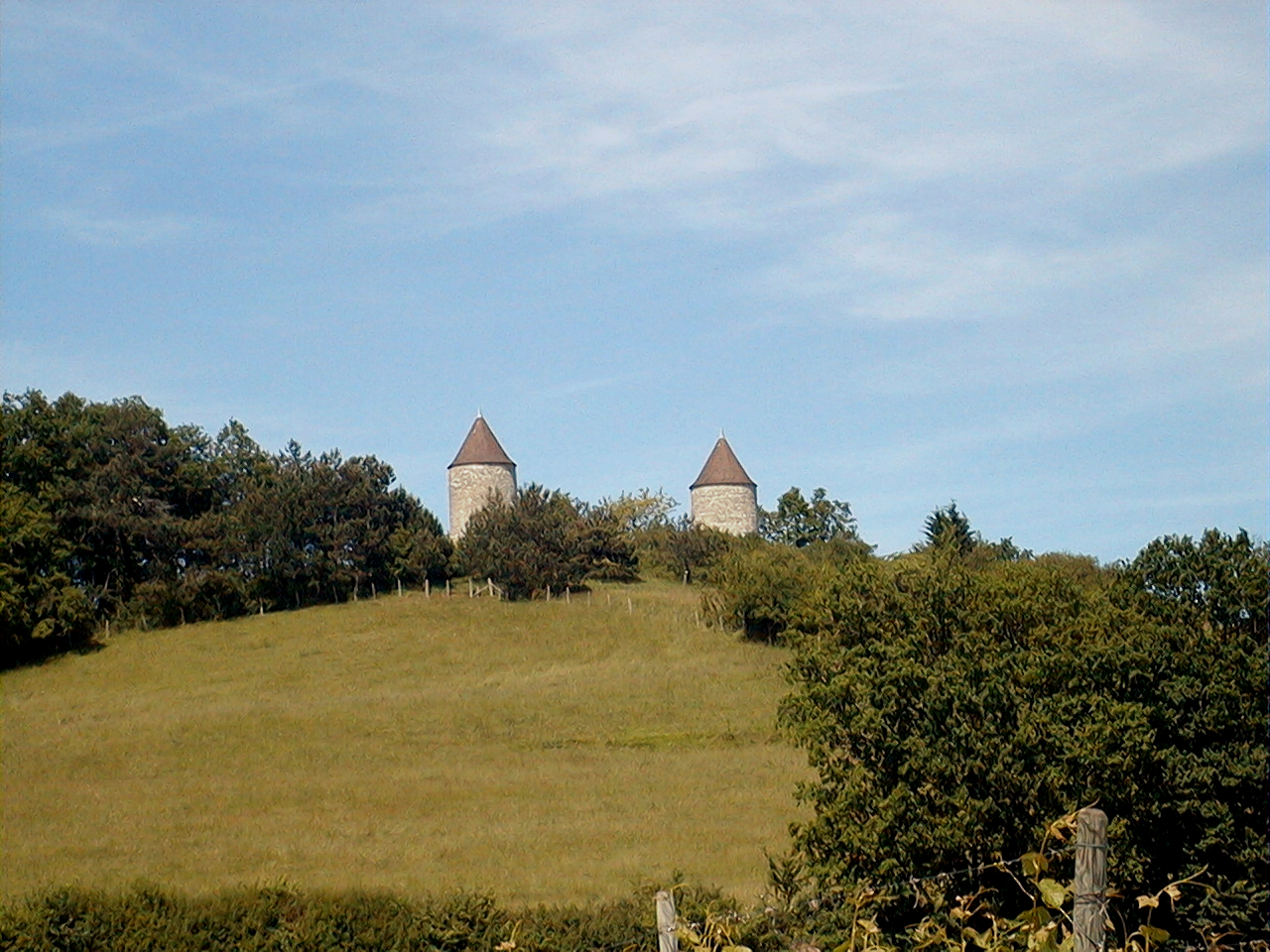
- The mills in Boisse
- Location of Boisse
- Location within France Location within Nouvelle-Aquitaine
- Coordinates: 44°43′01″N 0°39′18″E
- Country: France
- Region: Nouvelle-Aquitaine
- Department: Dordogne
- Arrondissement: Bergerac
- Canton: Sud-Bergeracois

Government
  - Mayor (2020–2026): Stéphanie Molle
- Area^{1}: 16.58 km^{2} (6.40 sq mi)
- Elevation: 176 m (577 ft)
- Highest elevation: 206 m (676 ft)
- Lowest elevation: 84 m (276 ft)
- Population (2023): 251
  - Density: 15.1/km^{2} (39.2/sq mi)
- Time zone: UTC+01:00 (CET)
  - Summer (DST): UTC+02:00 (CEST)
- INSEE/Postal code: 24045 /24560
- ^{1} French Land Register data, which excludes lakes, ponds, glaciers > 1 km^{2} (0.386 sq mi or 247 acres) and river estuaries.

Boisse (French pronunciation: [bwas]; Occitan: Boissa) is a commune in the Dordogne department in southwestern France.

== Population ==
Historical population
Year	Pop.	±% p.a.
1968	266	—
1975	207	−3.52%
1982	206	−0.07%
1990	196	−0.62%
1999	196	+0.00%
2007	230	+2.02%
2012	249	+1.60%
2017	246	−0.24%
2023	251	+0.34%
Source: INSEE

== See also ==
- Communes of the Dordogne département
