= Faurilles =

- Commune
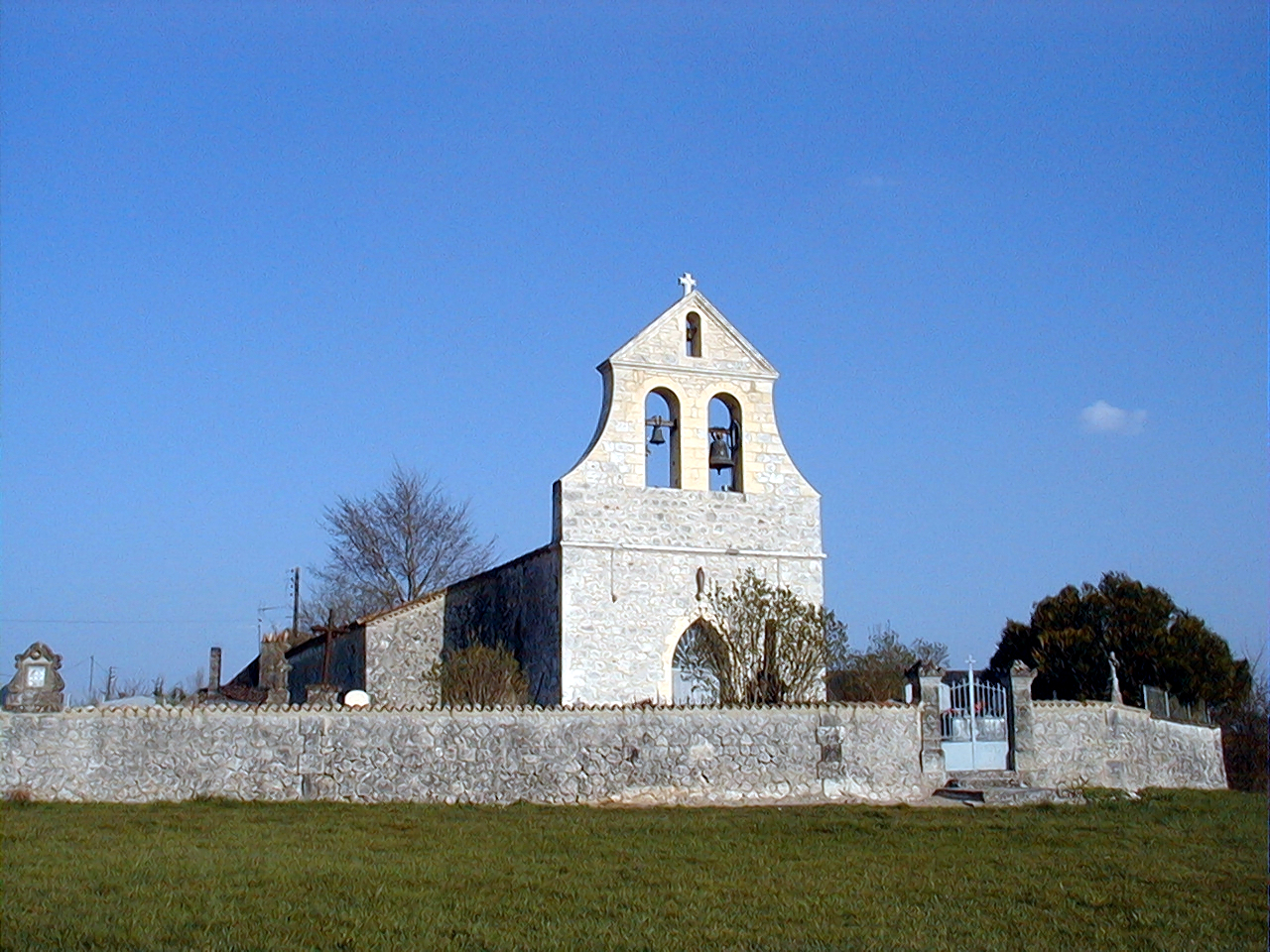
- The church in Faurilles
- Location of Faurilles
- Location within France Location within Nouvelle-Aquitaine
- Coordinates: 44°42′15″N 0°41′43″E
- Country: France
- Region: Nouvelle-Aquitaine
- Department: Dordogne
- Arrondissement: Bergerac
- Canton: Sud-Bergeracois

Government
  - Mayor (2020–2026): Gérard Martin
- Area^{1}: 4.3 km^{2} (1.7 sq mi)
- Elevation: 130 m (430 ft)
- Highest elevation: 141 m (463 ft)
- Lowest elevation: 79 m (259 ft)
- Population (2023): 36
  - Density: 8.4/km^{2} (22/sq mi)
- Time zone: UTC+01:00 (CET)
  - Summer (DST): UTC+02:00 (CEST)
- INSEE/Postal code: 24176 /24560
- ^{1} French Land Register data, which excludes lakes, ponds, glaciers > 1 km^{2} (0.386 sq mi or 247 acres) and river estuaries.

Faurilles (French pronunciation: [foʁij]; Occitan: Faurilhas) is a commune in the Dordogne department in Nouvelle-Aquitaine in southwestern France.

== Population ==
Historical population
Year	Pop.	±% p.a.
1968	77	—
1975	65	−2.39%
1982	60	−1.14%
1990	62	+0.41%
1999	63	+0.18%
2007	51	−2.61%
2012	42	−3.81%
2017	36	−3.04%
2023	36	+0.00%
Source: INSEE

== See also ==
- Communes of the Dordogne department
