= Singleyrac =

- Commune
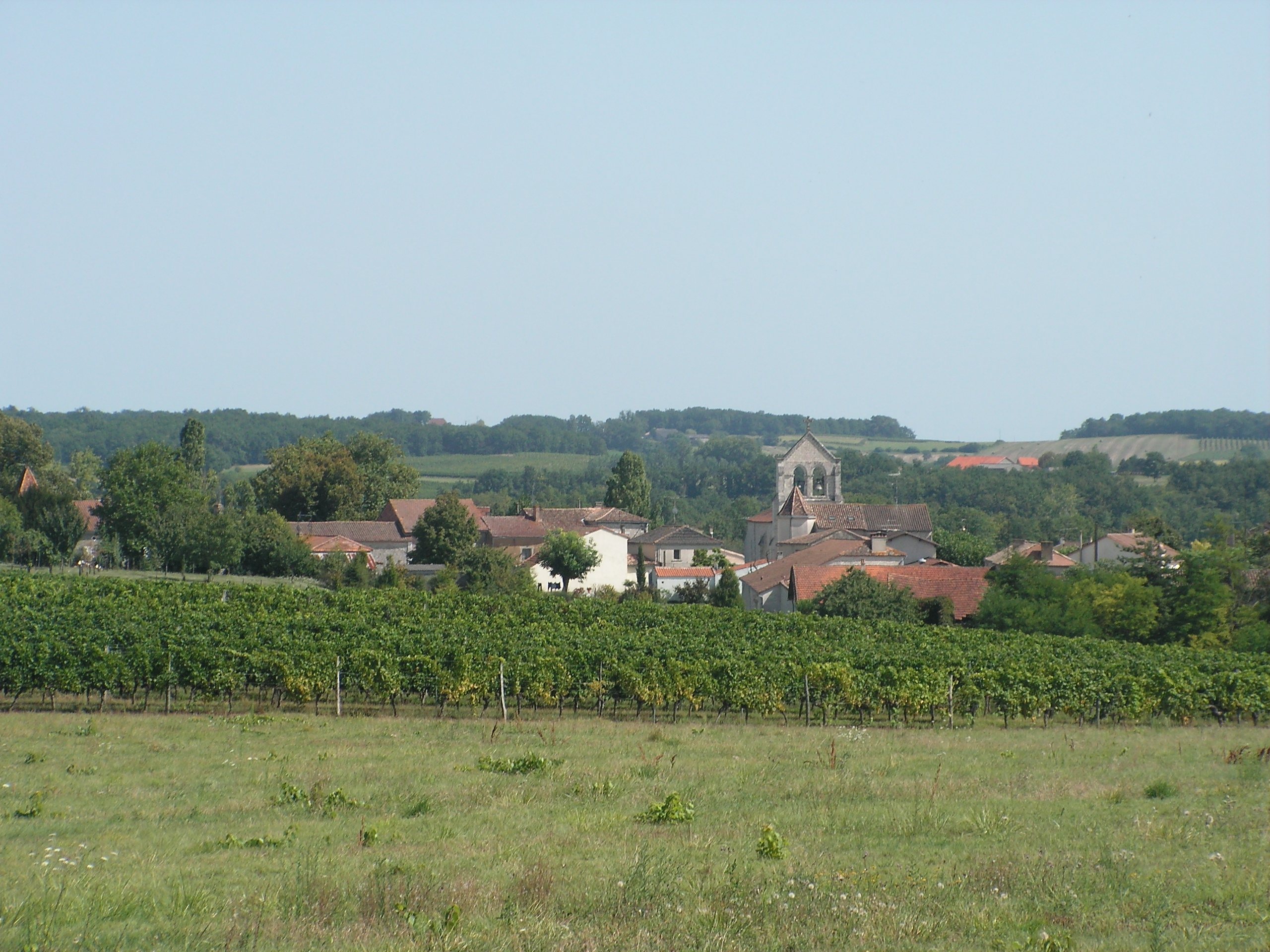
- A general view of Singleyrac
- Location of Singleyrac
- Location within France Location within Nouvelle-Aquitaine
- Coordinates: 44°44′15″N 0°27′55″E
- Country: France
- Region: Nouvelle-Aquitaine
- Department: Dordogne
- Arrondissement: Bergerac
- Canton: Sud-Bergeracois

Government
  - Mayor (2020–2026): Christine Lacotte
- Area^{1}: 7.09 km^{2} (2.74 sq mi)
- Elevation: 140 m (460 ft)
- Highest elevation: 177 m (581 ft)
- Lowest elevation: 72 m (236 ft)
- Population (2023): 314
  - Density: 44.3/km^{2} (115/sq mi)
- Time zone: UTC+01:00 (CET)
  - Summer (DST): UTC+02:00 (CEST)
- INSEE/Postal code: 24536 /24500
- ^{1} French Land Register data, which excludes lakes, ponds, glaciers > 1 km^{2} (0.386 sq mi or 247 acres) and river estuaries.

Singleyrac (French pronunciation: [sɛ̃.ɡlɛj.ʁak]) is a commune in the Dordogne department in Nouvelle-Aquitaine in southwestern France.

== Population ==
Historical population
Year	Pop.	±% p.a.
1968	129	—
1975	115	−1.63%
1982	127	+1.43%
1990	164	+3.25%
1999	234	+4.03%
2007	308	+3.49%
2012	323	+0.96%
2017	269	−3.59%
2023	314	+2.61%
Source: INSEE

== See also ==
- Communes of the Dordogne département
