= Canton of Sud-Bergeracois =

Coordinates: 44.67°N 0.40°E

The canton of Sud-Bergeracois is an administrative division of the Dordogne department, southwestern France. It was created at the French canton reorganisation which came into effect in March 2015. Its seat is in Eymet.

It consists of the following communes:

1. Bardou
2. Boisse
3. Bouniagues
4. Colombier
5. Conne-de-Labarde
6. Cunèges
7. Eymet
8. Faurilles
9. Faux-en-Périgord
10. Fonroque
11. Gageac-et-Rouillac
12. Issigeac
13. Mescoules
14. Monbazillac
15. Monestier
16. Monmadalès
17. Monmarvès
18. Monsaguel
19. Montaut
20. Plaisance
21. Pomport
22. Razac-d'Eymet
23. Razac-de-Saussignac
24. Ribagnac
25. Rouffignac-de-Sigoulès
26. Sadillac
27. Saint-Aubin-de-Cadelech
28. Saint-Aubin-de-Lanquais
29. Saint-Capraise-d'Eymet
30. Saint-Cernin-de-Labarde
31. Sainte-Radegonde
32. Saint-Julien-Innocence-Eulalie
33. Saint-Léon-d'Issigeac
34. Saint-Perdoux
35. Saussignac
36. Serres-et-Montguyard
37. Sigoulès-et-Flaugeac
38. Singleyrac
39. Thénac
