= Monmadalès =

- Commune
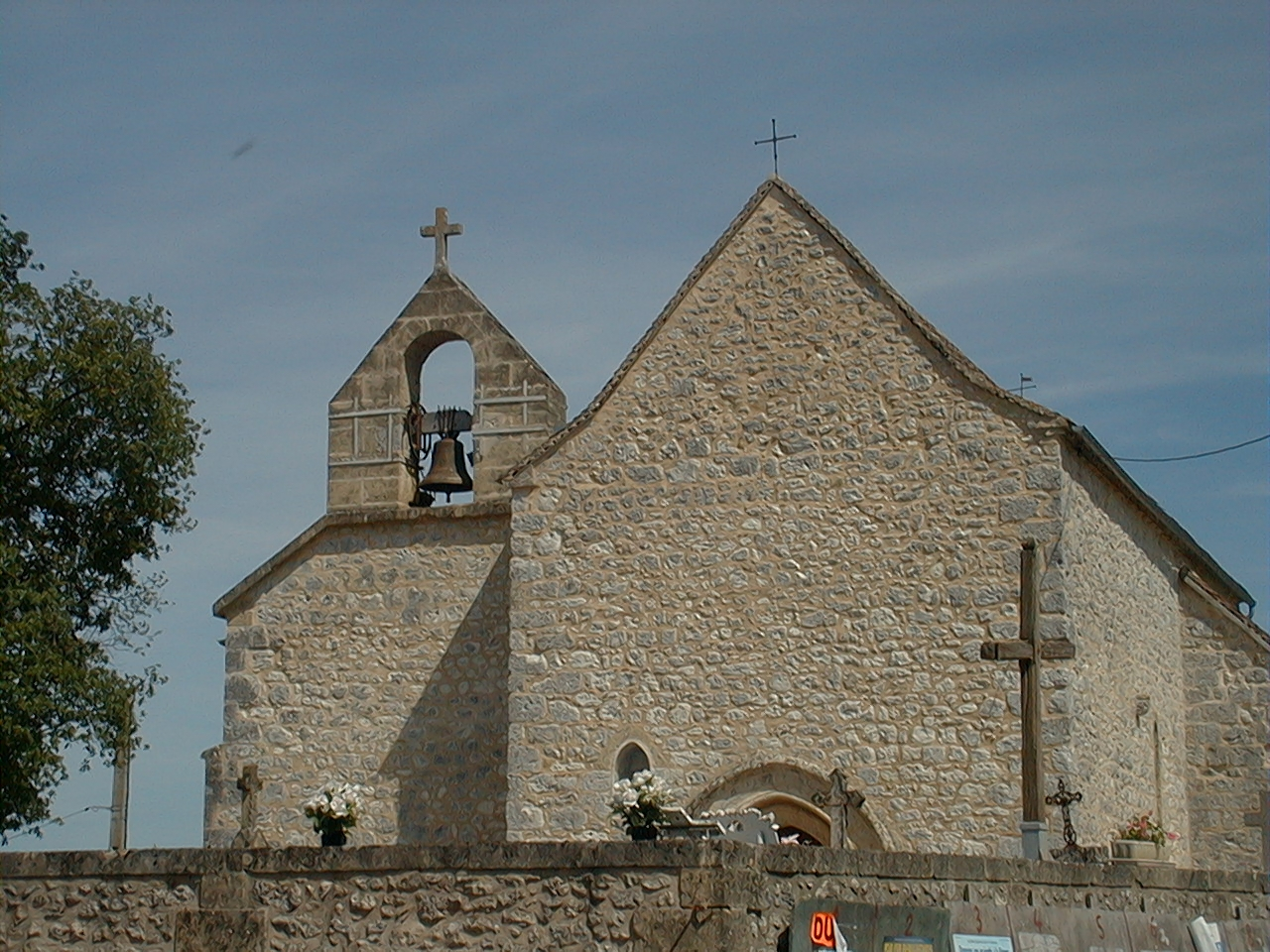
- The church in Monmadalès
- Location of Monmadalès
- Location within France Location within Nouvelle-Aquitaine
- Coordinates: 44°46′00″N 0°37′23″E
- Country: France
- Region: Nouvelle-Aquitaine
- Department: Dordogne
- Arrondissement: Bergerac
- Canton: Sud-Bergeracois

Government
  - Mayor (2020–2026): Serge Tabouret
- Area^{1}: 5.04 km^{2} (1.95 sq mi)
- Elevation: 136 m (446 ft)
- Highest elevation: 138 m (453 ft)
- Lowest elevation: 74 m (243 ft)
- Population (2023): 83
  - Density: 16/km^{2} (43/sq mi)
- Time zone: UTC+01:00 (CET)
  - Summer (DST): UTC+02:00 (CEST)
- INSEE/Postal code: 24278 /24560
- ^{1} French Land Register data, which excludes lakes, ponds, glaciers > 1 km^{2} (0.386 sq mi or 247 acres) and river estuaries.

Monmadalès (French pronunciation: [mɔ̃madalɛs]; Occitan: Montmadalés) is a commune in the Dordogne department in Nouvelle-Aquitaine in southwestern France.

== Population ==
Historical population
Year	Pop.	±% p.a.
1968	64	—
1975	81	+3.42%
1982	58	−4.66%
1990	52	−1.36%
1999	73	+3.84%
2007	69	−0.70%
2012	78	+2.48%
2017	82	+1.01%
2023	83	+0.20%
Source: INSEE

== See also ==
- Communes of the Dordogne department
