= Faux-en-Périgord =

- Commune
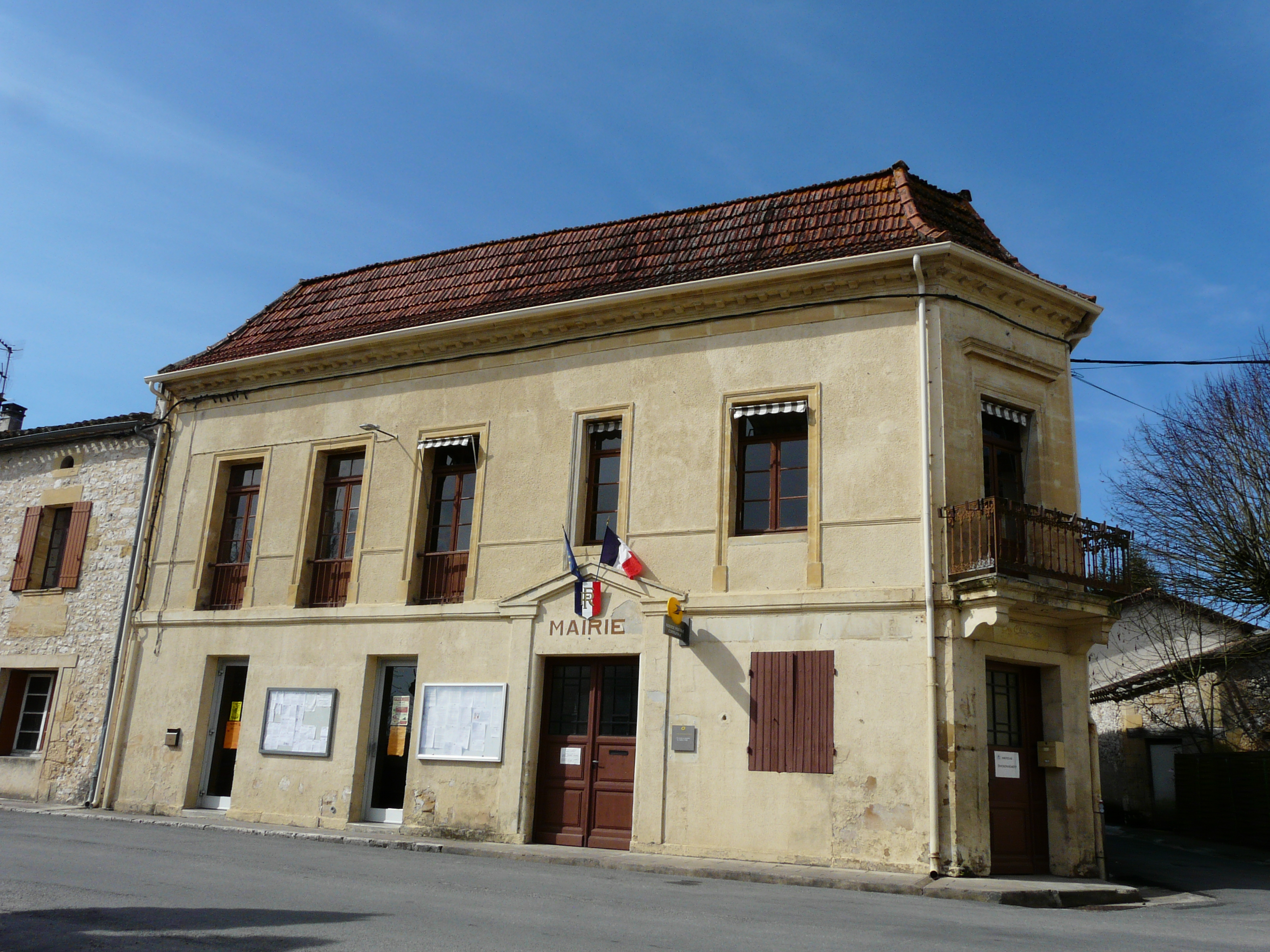
- Town hall
- Location of Faux-en-Périgord
- Location within France Location within Nouvelle-Aquitaine
- Coordinates: 44°47′24″N 0°38′37″E
- Country: France
- Region: Nouvelle-Aquitaine
- Department: Dordogne
- Arrondissement: Bergerac
- Canton: Sud-Bergeracois

Government
  - Mayor (2020–2026): Alain Legal
- Area^{1}: 16.07 km^{2} (6.20 sq mi)
- Elevation: 150 m (490 ft)
- Highest elevation: 171 m (561 ft)
- Lowest elevation: 67 m (220 ft)
- Population (2023): 672
  - Density: 41.8/km^{2} (108/sq mi)
- Time zone: UTC+01:00 (CET)
  - Summer (DST): UTC+02:00 (CEST)
- INSEE/Postal code: 24177 /24560
- ^{1} French Land Register data, which excludes lakes, ponds, glaciers > 1 km^{2} (0.386 sq mi or 247 acres) and river estuaries.

Faux-en-Périgord (French pronunciation: [fo]; Occitan: Faus, before 2025: Faux) is a commune in the Dordogne department in Nouvelle-Aquitaine in southwestern France.

After confusion with other French towns also called Faux, and computer problems caused by the meaning of the name, "false" or "fake", Faux received permission to change its name effective 1 January 2025.

== Population ==
Historical population
Year	Pop.	±% p.a.
1968	514	—
1975	612	+2.52%
1982	617	+0.12%
1990	586	−0.64%
1999	536	−0.99%
2007	566	+0.68%
2012	596	+1.04%
2017	630	+1.12%
2023	672	+1.08%
Source: INSEE

== See also ==
- Communes of the Dordogne department
