= Colombier, Dordogne =

Colombier
- Commune
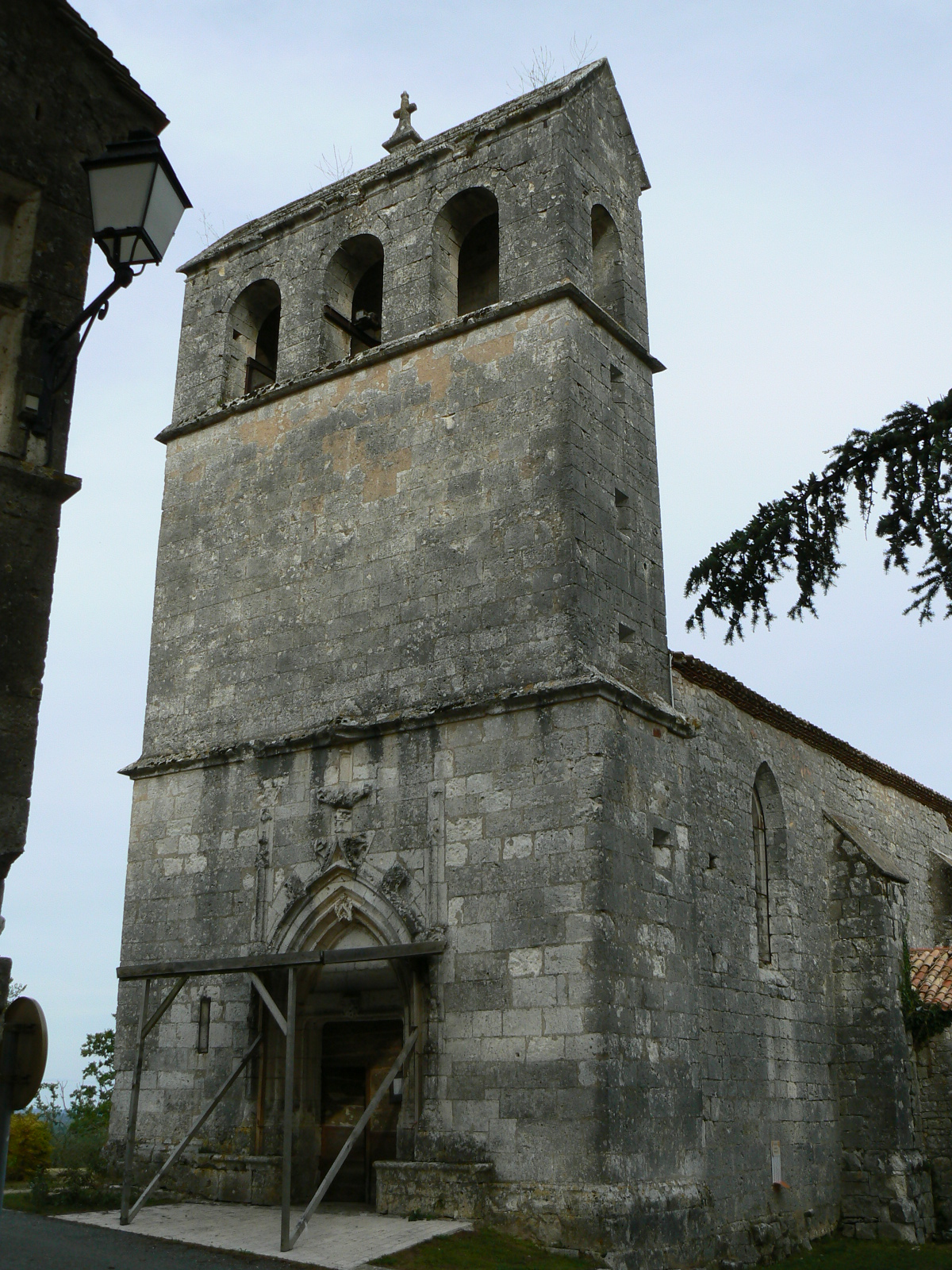
- The church in Colombier
- Location of Colombier
- Location within France Location within Nouvelle-Aquitaine
- Coordinates: 44°47′00″N 0°31′10″E
- Country: France
- Region: Nouvelle-Aquitaine
- Department: Dordogne
- Arrondissement: Bergerac
- Canton: Sud-Bergeracois
- Intercommunality: CA Bergeracoise

Government
  - Mayor (2020–2026): Marjorie Molleton
- Area^{1}: 7.03 km^{2} (2.71 sq mi)
- Elevation: 170 m (560 ft)
- Highest elevation: 172 m (564 ft)
- Lowest elevation: 54 m (177 ft)
- Population (2023): 285
  - Density: 40.5/km^{2} (105/sq mi)
- Time zone: UTC+01:00 (CET)
  - Summer (DST): UTC+02:00 (CEST)
- INSEE/Postal code: 24126 /24560
- ^{1} French Land Register data, which excludes lakes, ponds, glaciers > 1 km^{2} (0.386 sq mi or 247 acres) and river estuaries.

Colombier (French pronunciation: [kɔlɔ̃bje]; Occitan: Colombièr) is a commune in the Dordogne department in Nouvelle-Aquitaine in southwestern France.

== Population ==
Historical population
| Year | Pop. | ±% p.a. |
|---|---|---|
| 1968 | 233 | — |
| 1975 | 212 | −1.34% |
| 1982 | 195 | −1.19% |
| 1990 | 228 | +1.97% |
| 1999 | 226 | −0.10% |
| 2007 | 236 | +0.54% |
| 2012 | 239 | +0.25% |
| 2017 | 257 | +1.46% |
| 2023 | 285 | +1.74% |
Source: INSEE

== See also ==
- Communes of the Dordogne department
