= Bardou, Dordogne =

Bardou
- Commune
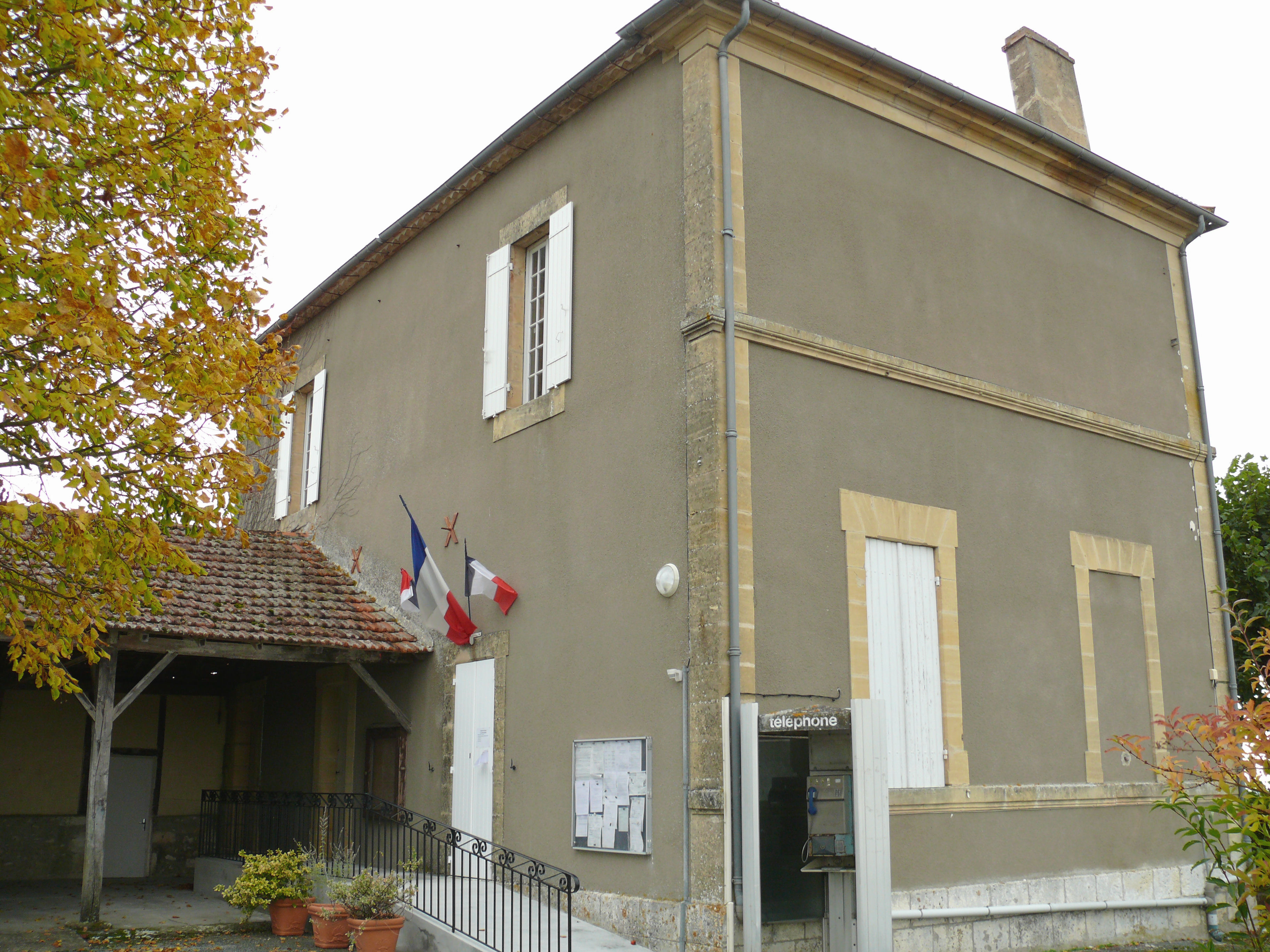
- The town hall in Bardou
- Location of Bardou
- Location within France Location within Nouvelle-Aquitaine
- Coordinates: 44°44′17″N 0°41′07″E
- Country: France
- Region: Nouvelle-Aquitaine
- Department: Dordogne
- Arrondissement: Bergerac
- Canton: Sud-Bergeracois

Government
  - Mayor (2020–2026): Jean-Paul Roussely
- Area^{1}: 4.76 km^{2} (1.84 sq mi)
- Elevation: 175 m (574 ft)
- Highest elevation: 181 m (594 ft)
- Lowest elevation: 124 m (407 ft)
- Population (2023): 44
  - Density: 9.2/km^{2} (24/sq mi)
- Time zone: UTC+01:00 (CET)
  - Summer (DST): UTC+02:00 (CEST)
- INSEE/Postal code: 24024 /24560
- ^{1} French Land Register data, which excludes lakes, ponds, glaciers > 1 km^{2} (0.386 sq mi or 247 acres) and river estuaries.

Bardou (French pronunciation: [baʁdu]; Occitan: Bardon) is a commune in the Dordogne department in southwestern France.

== Population ==
Historical population
Year	Pop.	±% p.a.
1968	54	—
1975	58	+1.03%
1982	43	−4.18%
1990	36	−2.20%
1999	33	−0.96%
2007	44	+3.66%
2012	42	−0.93%
2017	45	+1.39%
2023	44	−0.37%
Source: INSEE

== See also ==
- Communes of the Dordogne department
