= Serres-et-Montguyard =

- Commune
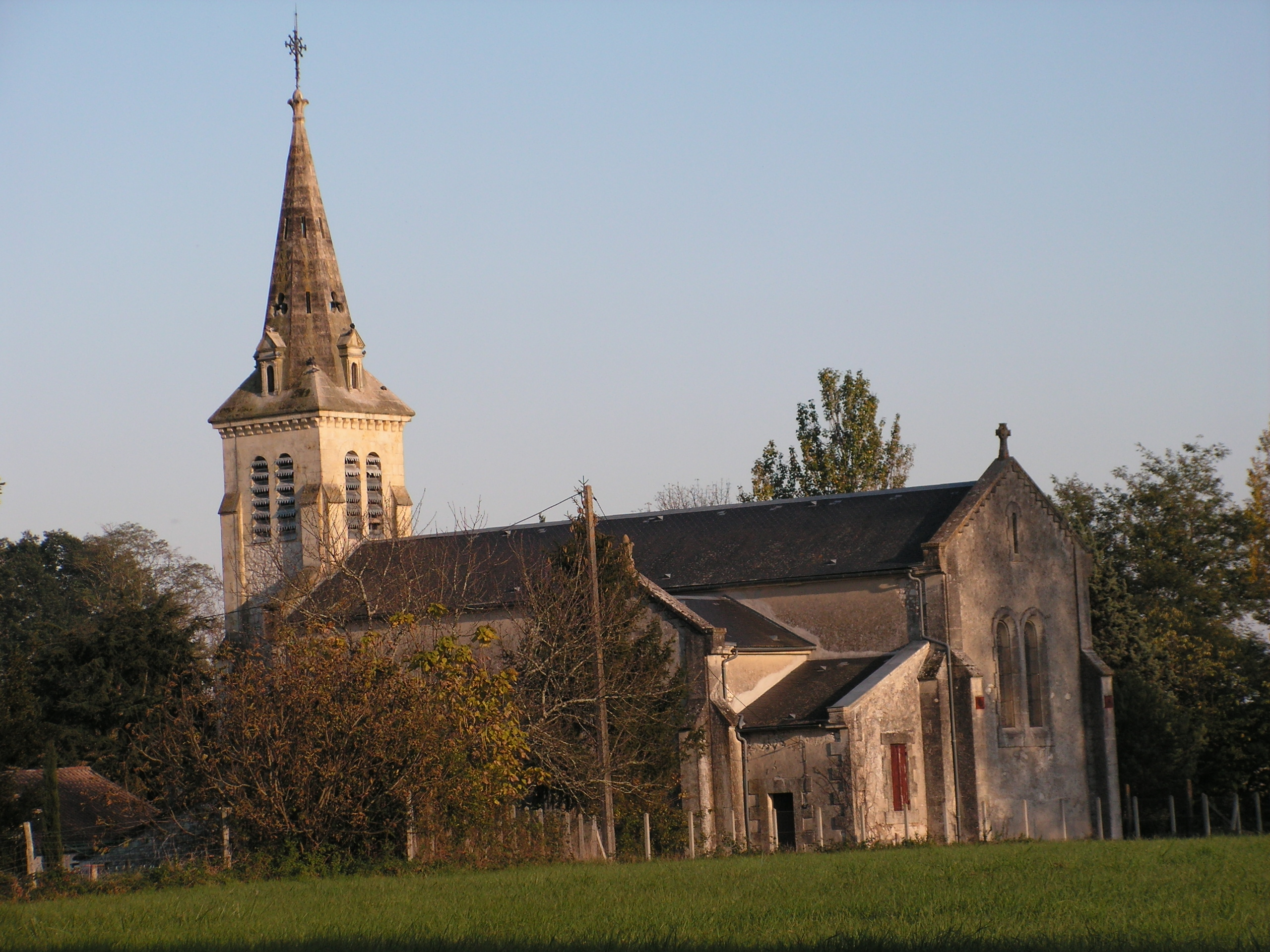
- The church in Serres-et-Montguyard
- Location of Serres-et-Montguyard
- Location within France Location within Nouvelle-Aquitaine
- Coordinates: 44°40′30″N 0°27′13″E
- Country: France
- Region: Nouvelle-Aquitaine
- Department: Dordogne
- Arrondissement: Bergerac
- Canton: Sud-Bergeracois

Government
  - Mayor (2020–2026): David Hilaire
- Area^{1}: 6.85 km^{2} (2.64 sq mi)
- Elevation: 50 m (160 ft)
- Highest elevation: 129 m (423 ft)
- Lowest elevation: 47 m (154 ft)
- Population (2023): 231
  - Density: 33.7/km^{2} (87.3/sq mi)
- Time zone: UTC+01:00 (CET)
  - Summer (DST): UTC+02:00 (CEST)
- INSEE/Postal code: 24532 /24500
- ^{1} French Land Register data, which excludes lakes, ponds, glaciers > 1 km^{2} (0.386 sq mi or 247 acres) and river estuaries.

Serres-et-Montguyard (French pronunciation: [sɛʁ e mɔ̃ɡɥijaʁ]; Occitan: Sèrras e Montguiard) is a commune in the Dordogne department in Nouvelle-Aquitaine in southwestern France.

== Population ==
Historical population
Year	Pop.	±% p.a.
1968	196	—
1975	181	−1.13%
1982	151	−2.56%
1990	139	−1.03%
1999	152	+1.00%
2007	185	+2.49%
2012	226	+4.08%
2017	237	+0.96%
2023	231	−0.43%
Source: INSEE

== See also ==
- Communes of the Dordogne département
