= Fonroque =

- Commune
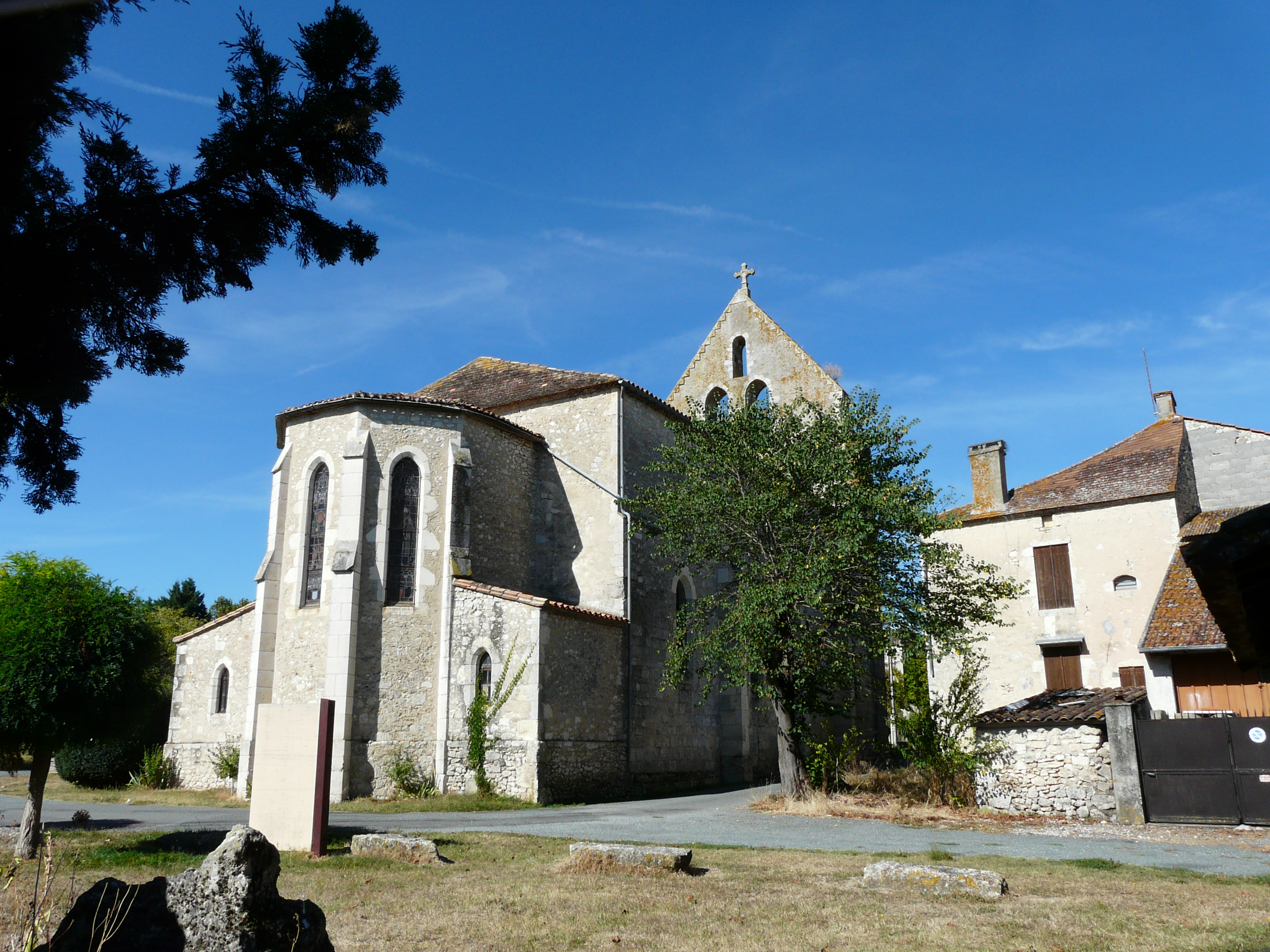
- The church of Saint-Jean-Baptiste in the village of Fonroque
- Location of Fonroque
- Location within France Location within Nouvelle-Aquitaine
- Coordinates: 44°42′10″N 0°25′07″E
- Country: France
- Region: Nouvelle-Aquitaine
- Department: Dordogne
- Arrondissement: Bergerac
- Canton: Sud-Bergeracois
- Intercommunality: Portes Sud Périgord

Government
  - Mayor (2020–2026): Lucie Grelon
- Area^{1}: 9 km^{2} (3.5 sq mi)
- Elevation: 50 m (160 ft)
- Highest elevation: 163 m (535 ft)
- Lowest elevation: 55 m (180 ft)
- Population (2023): 341
  - Density: 38/km^{2} (98/sq mi)
- Time zone: UTC+01:00 (CET)
  - Summer (DST): UTC+02:00 (CEST)
- INSEE/Postal code: 24186 /24500
- ^{1} French Land Register data, which excludes lakes, ponds, glaciers > 1 km^{2} (0.386 sq mi or 247 acres) and river estuaries.

Fonroque (French pronunciation: [fɔ̃ʁɔk]; Occitan: Font Ròca) is a commune in the Dordogne department in Nouvelle-Aquitaine in southwestern France.

== Population ==
Historical population
Year	Pop.	±% p.a.
1968	248	—
1975	241	−0.41%
1982	223	−1.10%
1990	212	−0.63%
1999	240	+1.39%
2007	249	+0.46%
2012	293	+3.31%
2017	326	+2.16%
2023	341	+0.75%
Source: INSEE

== See also ==
- Communes of the Dordogne department
