= Monmarvès =

- Commune
- Location of Monmarvès
- Location within France Location within Nouvelle-Aquitaine
- Coordinates: 44°42′36″N 0°36′48″E
- Country: France
- Region: Nouvelle-Aquitaine
- Department: Dordogne
- Arrondissement: Bergerac
- Canton: Sud-Bergeracois

Government
  - Mayor (2020–2026): Christian Barchiesi
- Area^{1}: 5.62 km^{2} (2.17 sq mi)
- Elevation: 120 m (390 ft)
- Highest elevation: 172 m (564 ft)
- Lowest elevation: 82 m (269 ft)
- Population (2023): 61
  - Density: 11/km^{2} (28/sq mi)
- Time zone: UTC+01:00 (CET)
  - Summer (DST): UTC+02:00 (CEST)
- INSEE/Postal code: 24279 /24560
- ^{1} French Land Register data, which excludes lakes, ponds, glaciers > 1 km^{2} (0.386 sq mi or 247 acres) and river estuaries.

Monmarvès (French pronunciation: [mɔ̃maʁvɛs]; Occitan: Montmarvés) is a commune in the Dordogne department in Nouvelle-Aquitaine in southwestern France.

== Population ==
Historical population
Year	Pop.	±% p.a.
1968	62	—
1975	44	−4.78%
1982	42	−0.66%
1990	54	+3.19%
1999	57	+0.60%
2007	46	−2.64%
2012	58	+4.75%
2017	64	+1.99%
2023	61	−0.80%
Source: INSEE

== See also ==
- Communes of the Dordogne department
