= Sadillac =

- Commune
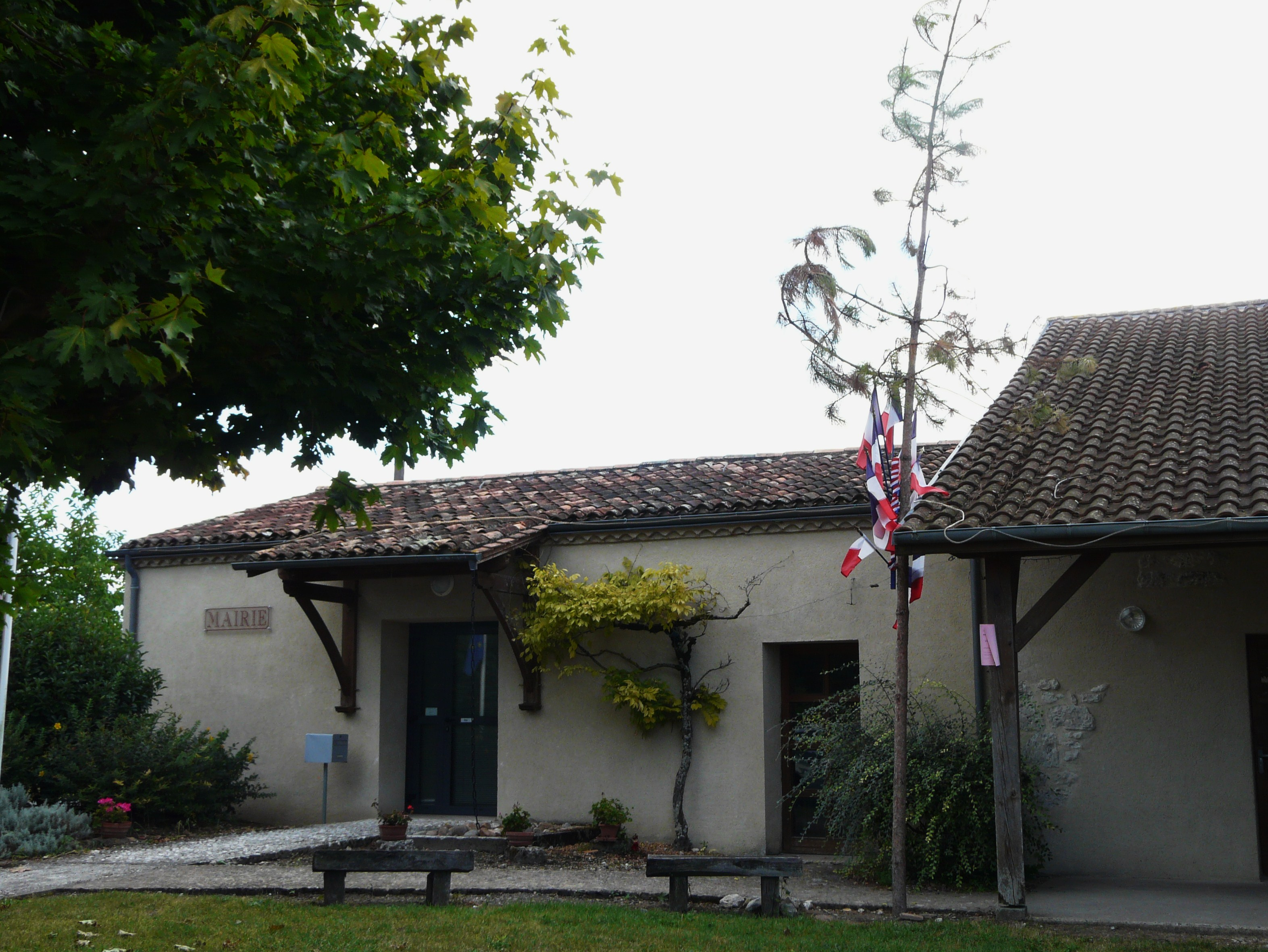
- The town hall in Sadillac
- Location of Sadillac
- Location within France Location within Nouvelle-Aquitaine
- Coordinates: 44°44′05″N 0°29′03″E
- Country: France
- Region: Nouvelle-Aquitaine
- Department: Dordogne
- Arrondissement: Bergerac
- Canton: Sud-Bergeracois

Government
  - Mayor (2020–2026): Yves Bordes
- Area^{1}: 5.63 km^{2} (2.17 sq mi)
- Elevation: 150 m (490 ft)
- Highest elevation: 193 m (633 ft)
- Lowest elevation: 104 m (341 ft)
- Population (2023): 100
  - Density: 18/km^{2} (46/sq mi)
- Time zone: UTC+01:00 (CET)
  - Summer (DST): UTC+02:00 (CEST)
- INSEE/Postal code: 24359 /24500
- ^{1} French Land Register data, which excludes lakes, ponds, glaciers > 1 km^{2} (0.386 sq mi or 247 acres) and river estuaries.

Sadillac (French pronunciation: [sadijak]; Occitan: Sadilhac) is a commune in the Dordogne department in Nouvelle-Aquitaine in southwestern France.

== Population ==
Historical population
Year	Pop.	±% p.a.
1968	138	—
1975	102	−4.23%
1982	100	−0.28%
1990	113	+1.54%
1999	92	−2.26%
2007	102	+1.30%
2012	113	+2.07%
2017	119	+1.04%
2023	100	−2.86%
Source: INSEE

== See also ==
- Communes of the Dordogne department
