= Conne-de-Labarde =

Conne de Labarde
- Commune
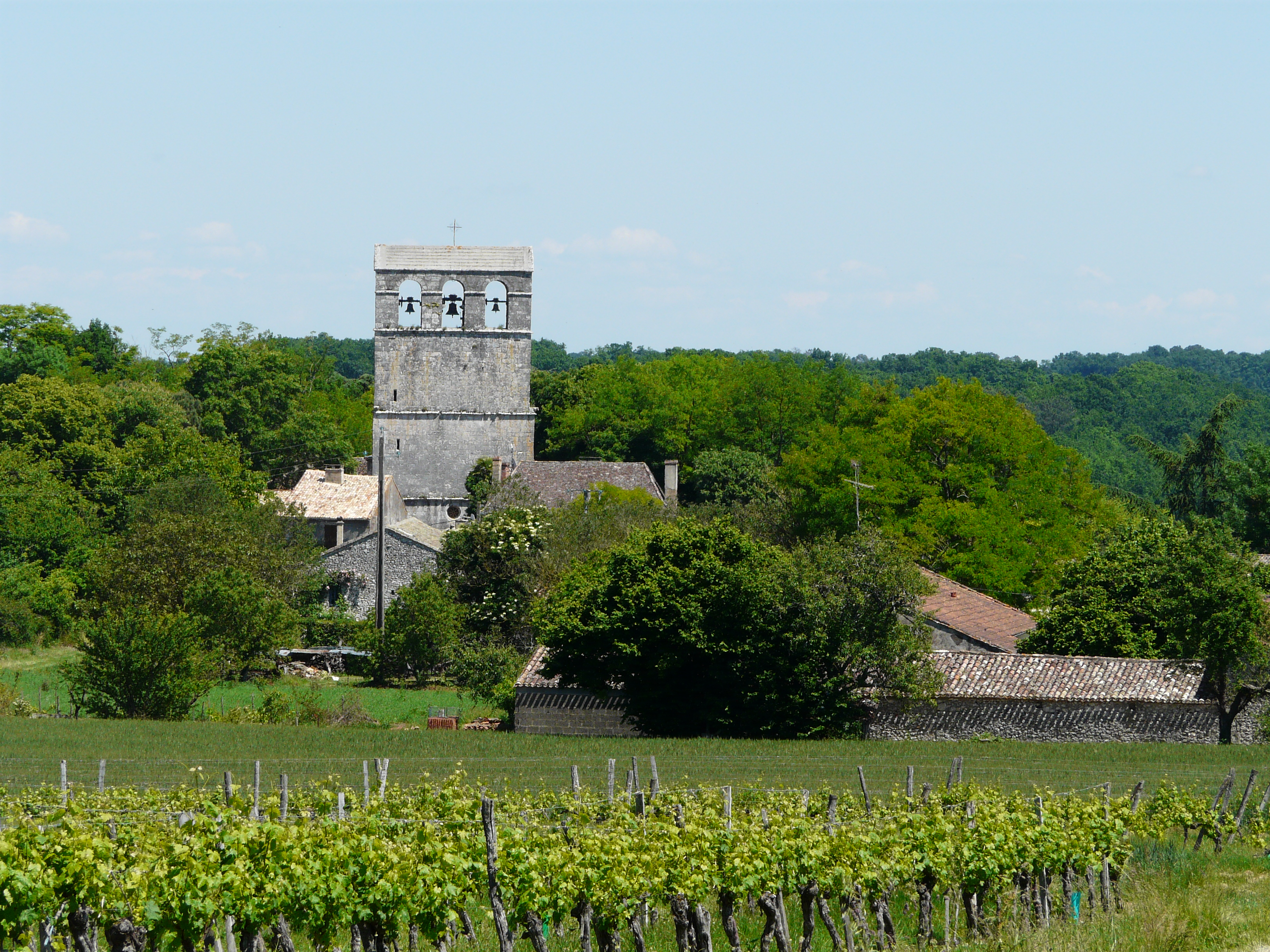
- The church and surroundings in Conne-de-Labarde

- Coat of arms
- Location of Conne de Labarde
- Location within France Location within Nouvelle-Aquitaine
- Coordinates: 44°46′52″N 0°33′18″E
- Country: France
- Region: Nouvelle-Aquitaine
- Department: Dordogne
- Arrondissement: Bergerac
- Canton: Sud-Bergeracois

Government
  - Mayor (2020–2026): Bernard Triffe
- Area^{1}: 10.05 km^{2} (3.88 sq mi)
- Elevation: 75 m (246 ft)
- Highest elevation: 134 m (440 ft)
- Lowest elevation: 47 m (154 ft)
- Population (2023): 249
  - Density: 24.8/km^{2} (64.2/sq mi)
- Time zone: UTC+01:00 (CET)
  - Summer (DST): UTC+02:00 (CEST)
- INSEE/Postal code: 24132 /24560
- ^{1} French Land Register data, which excludes lakes, ponds, glaciers > 1 km^{2} (0.386 sq mi or 247 acres) and river estuaries.

Conne-de-Labarde (French pronunciation: [kɔn də labaʁd]; Occitan: Còmna de La Barda) is a commune in the Dordogne department in Nouvelle-Aquitaine in southwestern France.

== Population ==
Historical population
Year	Pop.	±% p.a.
1968	190	—
1975	132	−5.07%
1982	141	+0.95%
1990	191	+3.87%
1999	204	+0.73%
2007	217	+0.78%
2012	235	+1.61%
2017	246	+0.92%
2023	249	+0.20%
Source: INSEE

== See also ==
- Communes of the Dordogne department
