= Saint-Cernin-de-Labarde =

- Commune
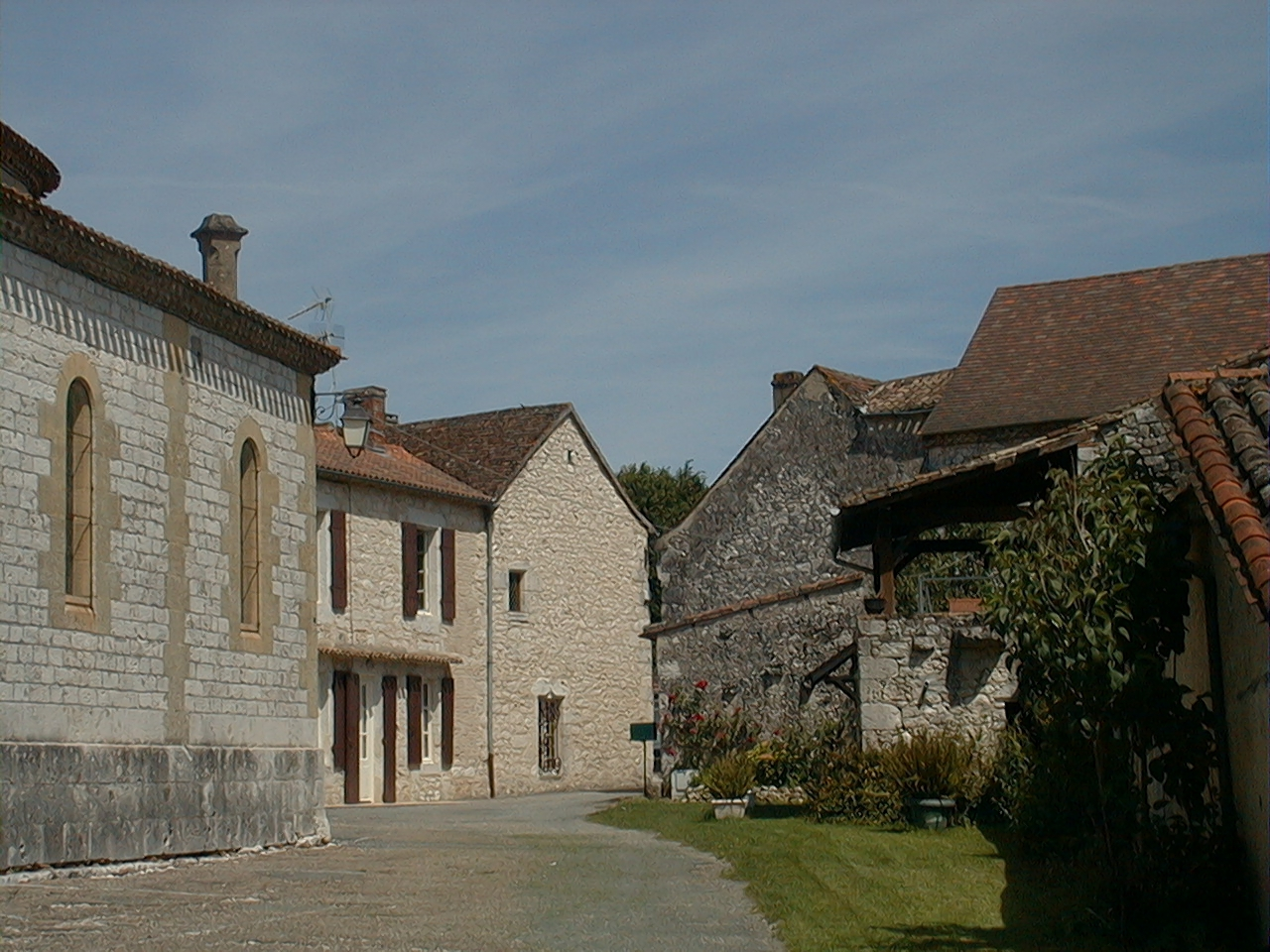
- A view within Saint-Cernin-de-Labarde
- Location of Saint-Cernin-de-Labarde
- Location within France Location within Nouvelle-Aquitaine
- Coordinates: 44°45′54″N 0°34′23″E
- Country: France
- Region: Nouvelle-Aquitaine
- Department: Dordogne
- Arrondissement: Bergerac
- Canton: Sud-Bergeracois

Government
  - Mayor (2020–2026): Vianney d'Hautefeuille
- Area^{1}: 11.39 km^{2} (4.40 sq mi)
- Elevation: 100 m (330 ft)
- Highest elevation: 133 m (436 ft)
- Lowest elevation: 52 m (171 ft)
- Population (2023): 221
  - Density: 19.4/km^{2} (50.3/sq mi)
- Time zone: UTC+01:00 (CET)
  - Summer (DST): UTC+02:00 (CEST)
- INSEE/Postal code: 24385 /24560
- ^{1} French Land Register data, which excludes lakes, ponds, glaciers > 1 km^{2} (0.386 sq mi or 247 acres) and river estuaries.

Saint-Cernin-de-Labarde (French pronunciation: [sɛ̃ sɛʁnɛ̃ də labaʁd]; Occitan: Sent Sarnin de La Barda) is a commune in the Dordogne department in Nouvelle-Aquitaine in southwestern France.

== Population ==
Historical population
| Year | Pop. | ±% p.a. |
|---|---|---|
| 1968 | 223 | — |
| 1975 | 201 | −1.47% |
| 1982 | 197 | −0.29% |
| 1990 | 231 | +2.01% |
| 1999 | 241 | +0.47% |
| 2007 | 199 | −2.37% |
| 2012 | 200 | +0.10% |
| 2017 | 211 | +1.08% |
| 2023 | 221 | +0.77% |
Source: INSEE

== See also ==
- Communes of the Dordogne department
- Château de l'Herm
