= Monsaguel =

- Commune
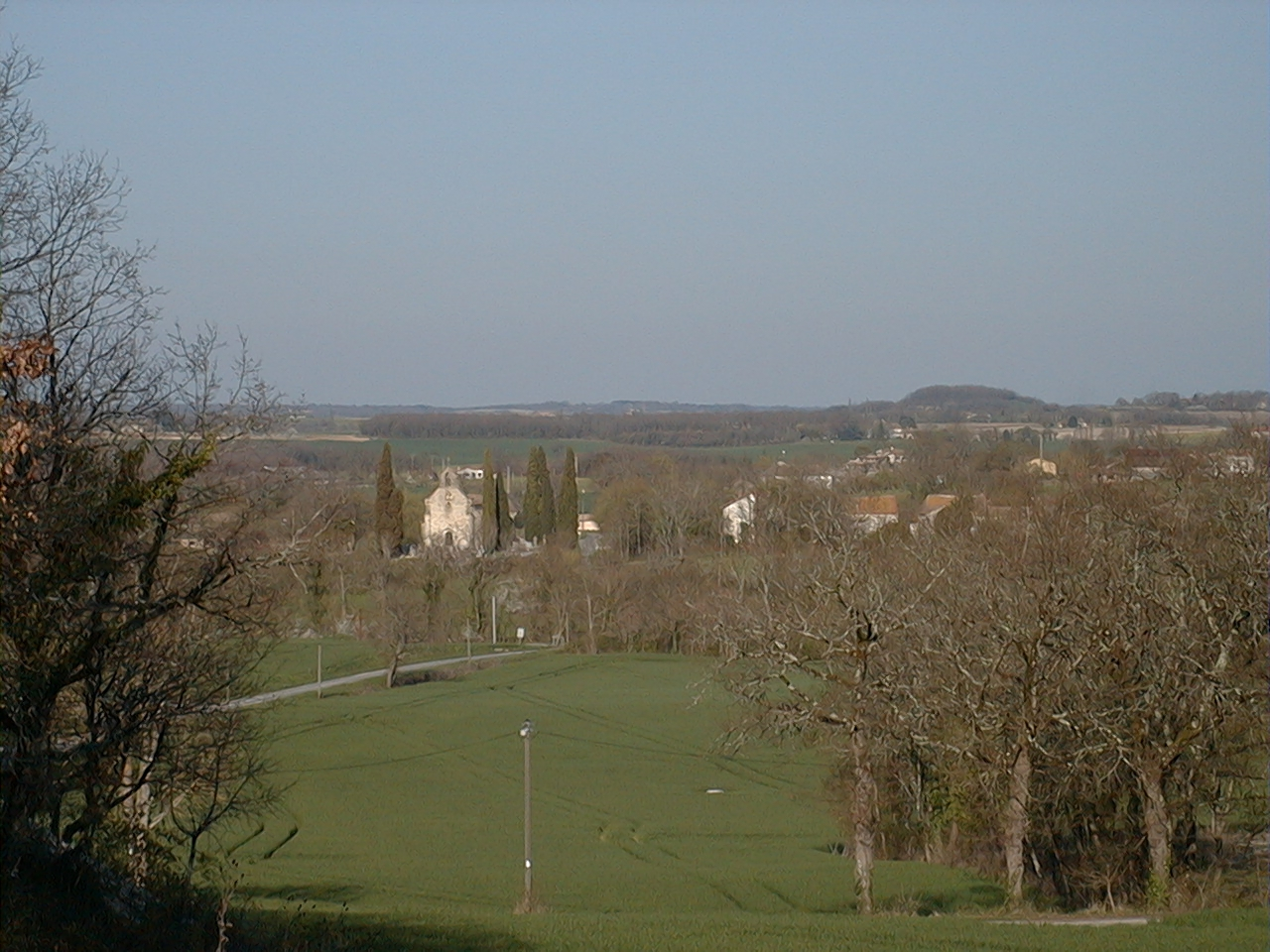
- A general view of Monsaguel
- Location of Monsaguel
- Location within France Location within Nouvelle-Aquitaine
- Coordinates: 44°44′18″N 0°34′52″E
- Country: France
- Region: Nouvelle-Aquitaine
- Department: Dordogne
- Arrondissement: Bergerac
- Canton: Sud-Bergeracois

Government
  - Mayor (2020–2026): Hervé Delage
- Area^{1}: 11.57 km^{2} (4.47 sq mi)
- Elevation: 111 m (364 ft)
- Highest elevation: 173 m (568 ft)
- Lowest elevation: 62 m (203 ft)
- Population (2023): 131
  - Density: 11.3/km^{2} (29.3/sq mi)
- Time zone: UTC+01:00 (CET)
  - Summer (DST): UTC+02:00 (CEST)
- INSEE/Postal code: 24282 /24560
- ^{1} French Land Register data, which excludes lakes, ponds, glaciers > 1 km^{2} (0.386 sq mi or 247 acres) and river estuaries.

Monsaguel (French pronunciation: [mɔ̃saɡɛl]; Occitan: Monsaguèl) is a commune in the Dordogne department in Nouvelle-Aquitaine in southwestern France.

== Population ==
Historical population
Year	Pop.	±% p.a.
1968	114	—
1975	92	−3.02%
1982	113	+2.98%
1990	125	+1.27%
1999	129	+0.35%
2007	151	+1.99%
2012	159	+1.04%
2017	152	−0.90%
2023	131	−2.45%
Source: INSEE

== See also ==
- Communes of the Dordogne department
