= Montaut, Dordogne =

Montaut
- Commune
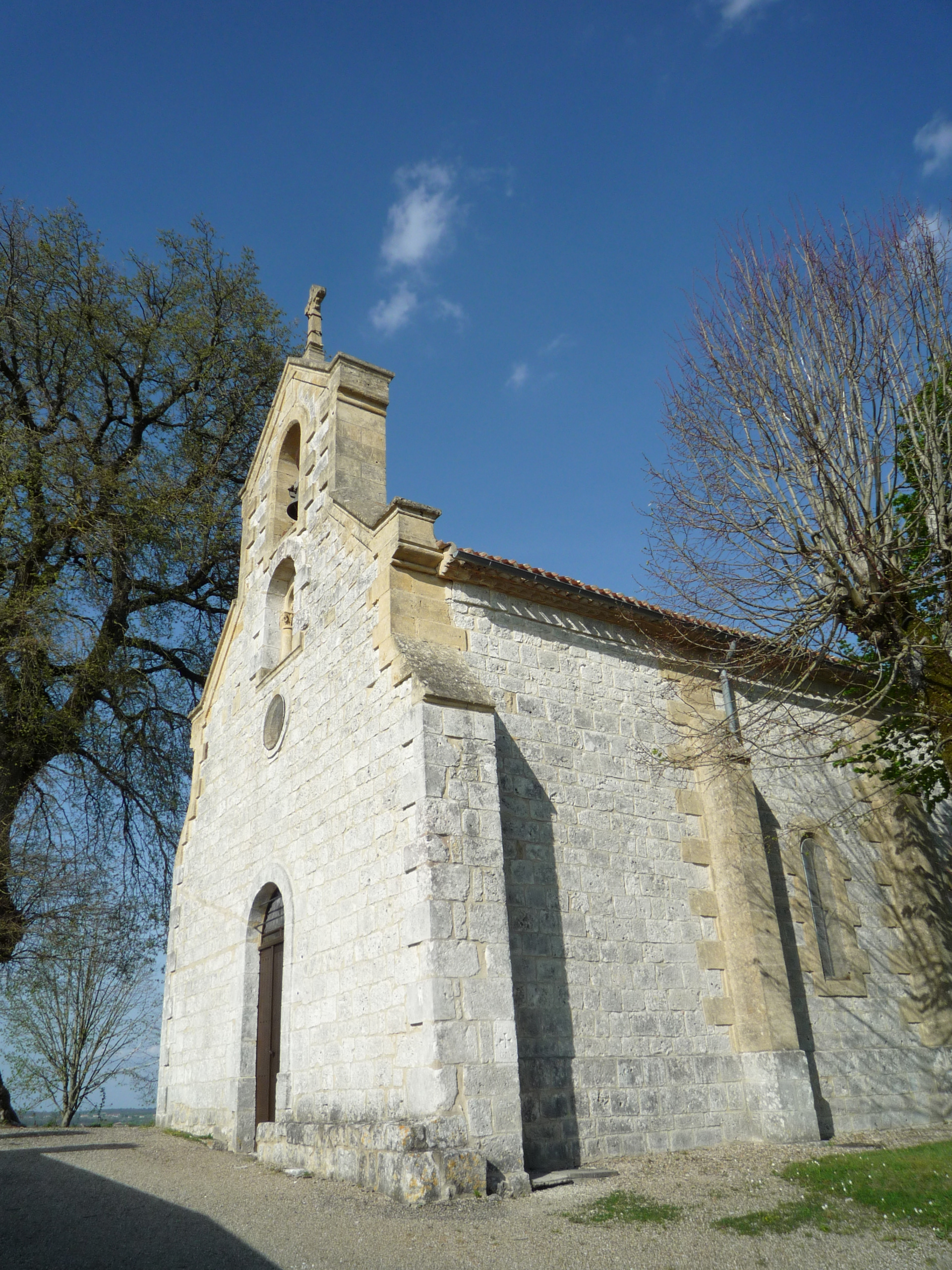
- The church in Montaut

- Coat of arms
- Location of Montaut
- Location within France Location within Nouvelle-Aquitaine
- Coordinates: 44°44′57″N 0°37′39″E
- Country: France
- Region: Nouvelle-Aquitaine
- Department: Dordogne
- Arrondissement: Bergerac
- Canton: Sud-Bergeracois

Government
  - Mayor (2020–2026): Yves Veyrac
- Area^{1}: 16.16 km^{2} (6.24 sq mi)
- Elevation: 150 m (490 ft)
- Highest elevation: 173 m (568 ft)
- Lowest elevation: 109 m (358 ft)
- Population (2023): 127
  - Density: 7.86/km^{2} (20.4/sq mi)
- Time zone: UTC+01:00 (CET)
  - Summer (DST): UTC+02:00 (CEST)
- INSEE/Postal code: 24287 /24560
- ^{1} French Land Register data, which excludes lakes, ponds, glaciers > 1 km^{2} (0.386 sq mi or 247 acres) and river estuaries.

Montaut (French pronunciation: [mɔ̃to]) is a commune in the Dordogne department in Nouvelle-Aquitaine in southwestern France.

== Population ==
Historical population
Year	Pop.	±% p.a.
1968	123	—
1975	103	−2.50%
1982	107	+0.55%
1990	105	−0.24%
1999	114	+0.92%
2007	108	−0.67%
2012	122	+2.47%
2017	130	+1.28%
2023	127	−0.39%
Source: INSEE

== See also ==
- Communes of the Dordogne department
