= Saint-Capraise-d'Eymet =

- Commune
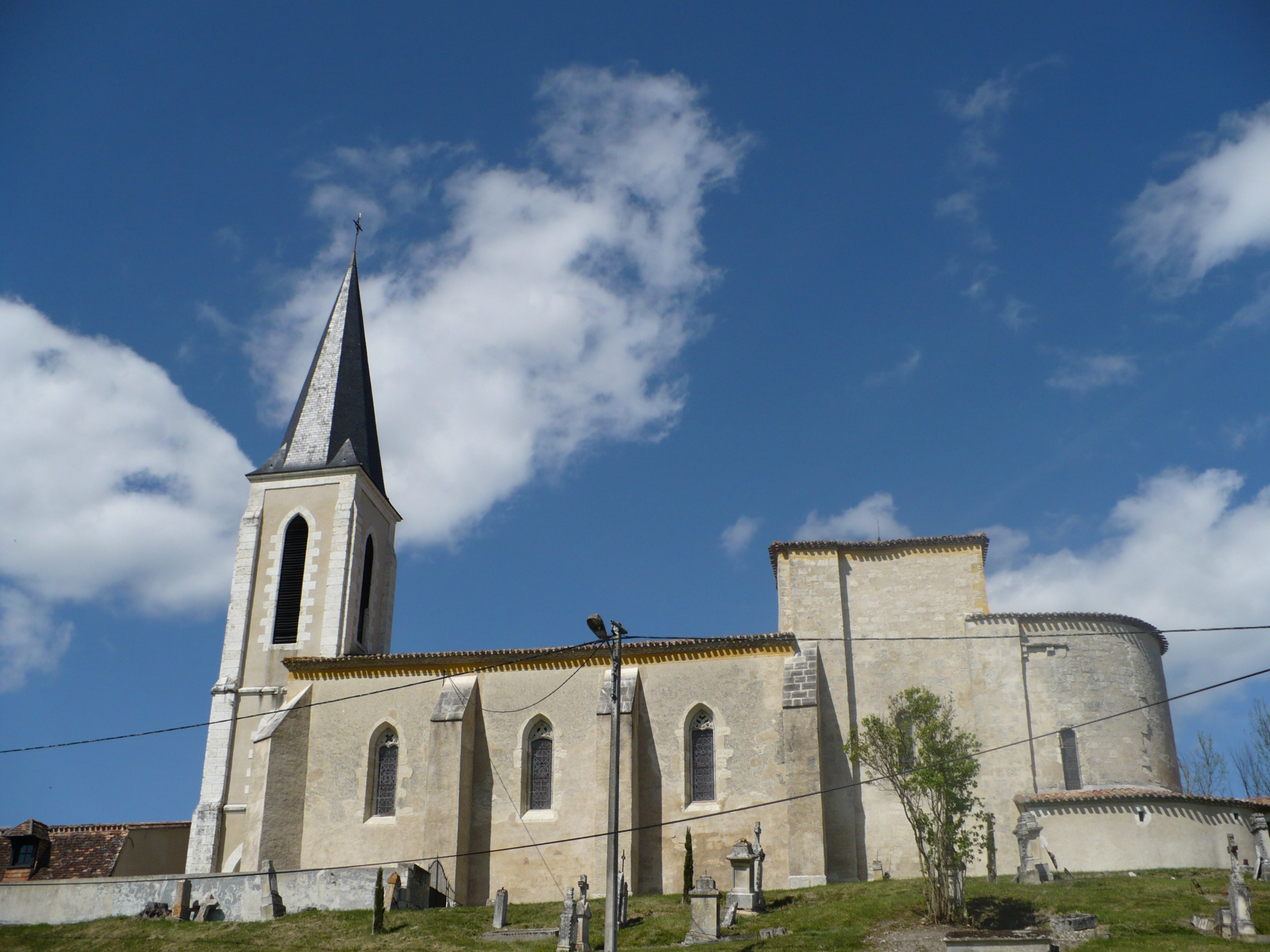
- The church in Saint-Capraise-d'Eymet
- Location of Saint-Capraise-d'Eymet
- Location within France Location within Nouvelle-Aquitaine
- Coordinates: 44°42′35″N 0°30′20″E
- Country: France
- Region: Nouvelle-Aquitaine
- Department: Dordogne
- Arrondissement: Bergerac
- Canton: Sud-Bergeracois
- Intercommunality: Portes Sud Périgord

Government
  - Mayor (2020–2026): Henri Tonello
- Area^{1}: 11.18 km^{2} (4.32 sq mi)
- Elevation: 174 m (571 ft)
- Highest elevation: 191 m (627 ft)
- Lowest elevation: 74 m (243 ft)
- Population (2023): 177
  - Density: 15.8/km^{2} (41.0/sq mi)
- Time zone: UTC+01:00 (CET)
  - Summer (DST): UTC+02:00 (CEST)
- INSEE/Postal code: 24383 /24500
- ^{1} French Land Register data, which excludes lakes, ponds, glaciers > 1 km^{2} (0.386 sq mi or 247 acres) and river estuaries.

Saint-Capraise-d'Eymet (Occitan: Sent Grapasi d'Aimet) is a commune in the Dordogne department in Nouvelle-Aquitaine in southwestern France.

== Population ==
Historical population
Year	Pop.	±% p.a.
1968	163	—
1975	150	−1.18%
1982	143	−0.68%
1990	153	+0.85%
1999	150	−0.22%
2007	140	−0.86%
2012	144	+0.57%
2017	156	+1.61%
2023	177	+2.13%
Source: INSEE

== See also ==
- Communes of the Dordogne department
