= Razac-de-Saussignac =

- Commune
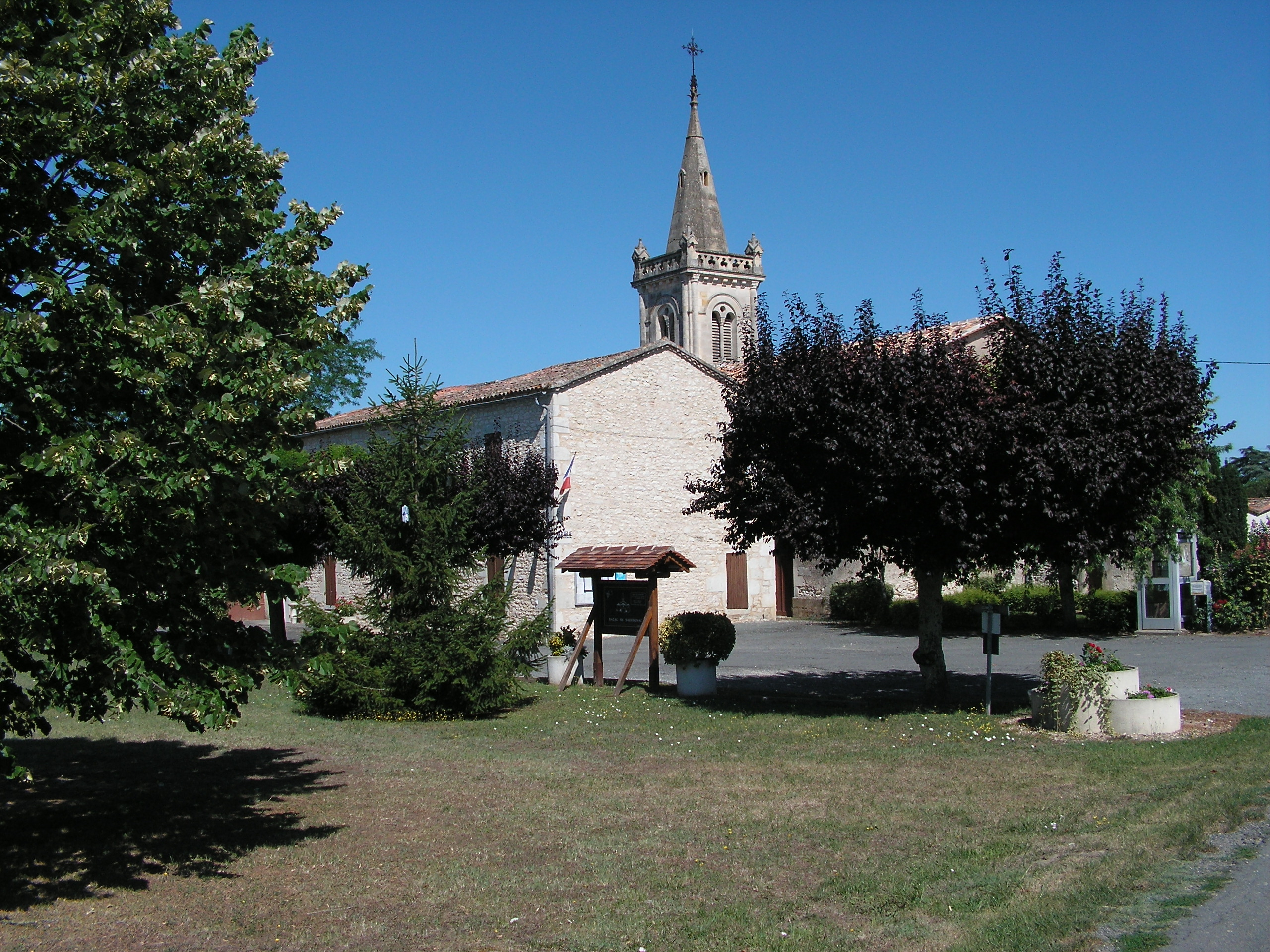
- The church and surroundings in Razac-de-Saussignac
- Location of Razac-de-Saussignac
- Location within France Location within Nouvelle-Aquitaine
- Coordinates: 44°48′18″N 0°17′07″E
- Country: France
- Region: Nouvelle-Aquitaine
- Department: Dordogne
- Arrondissement: Bergerac
- Canton: Sud-Bergeracois
- Intercommunality: CA Bergeracoise

Government
  - Mayor (2020–2026): René Visentini
- Area^{1}: 11.58 km^{2} (4.47 sq mi)
- Elevation: 110 m (360 ft)
- Highest elevation: 141 m (463 ft)
- Lowest elevation: 26 m (85 ft)
- Population (2023): 335
  - Density: 28.9/km^{2} (74.9/sq mi)
- Time zone: UTC+01:00 (CET)
  - Summer (DST): UTC+02:00 (CEST)
- INSEE/Postal code: 24349 /24240
- ^{1} French Land Register data, which excludes lakes, ponds, glaciers > 1 km^{2} (0.386 sq mi or 247 acres) and river estuaries.

Razac-de-Saussignac is a commune in the Dordogne department in Nouvelle-Aquitaine in southwestern France.

== Population ==
Historical population
Year	Pop.	±% p.a.
1968	310	—
1975	282	−1.34%
1982	274	−0.41%
1990	308	+1.47%
1999	332	+0.84%
2007	395	+2.20%
2012	350	−2.39%
2017	332	−1.05%
2023	335	+0.15%
Source: INSEE

== See also ==
- Communes of the Dordogne department
