= Sainte-Radegonde, Dordogne =

Sainte-Radegonde
- Commune
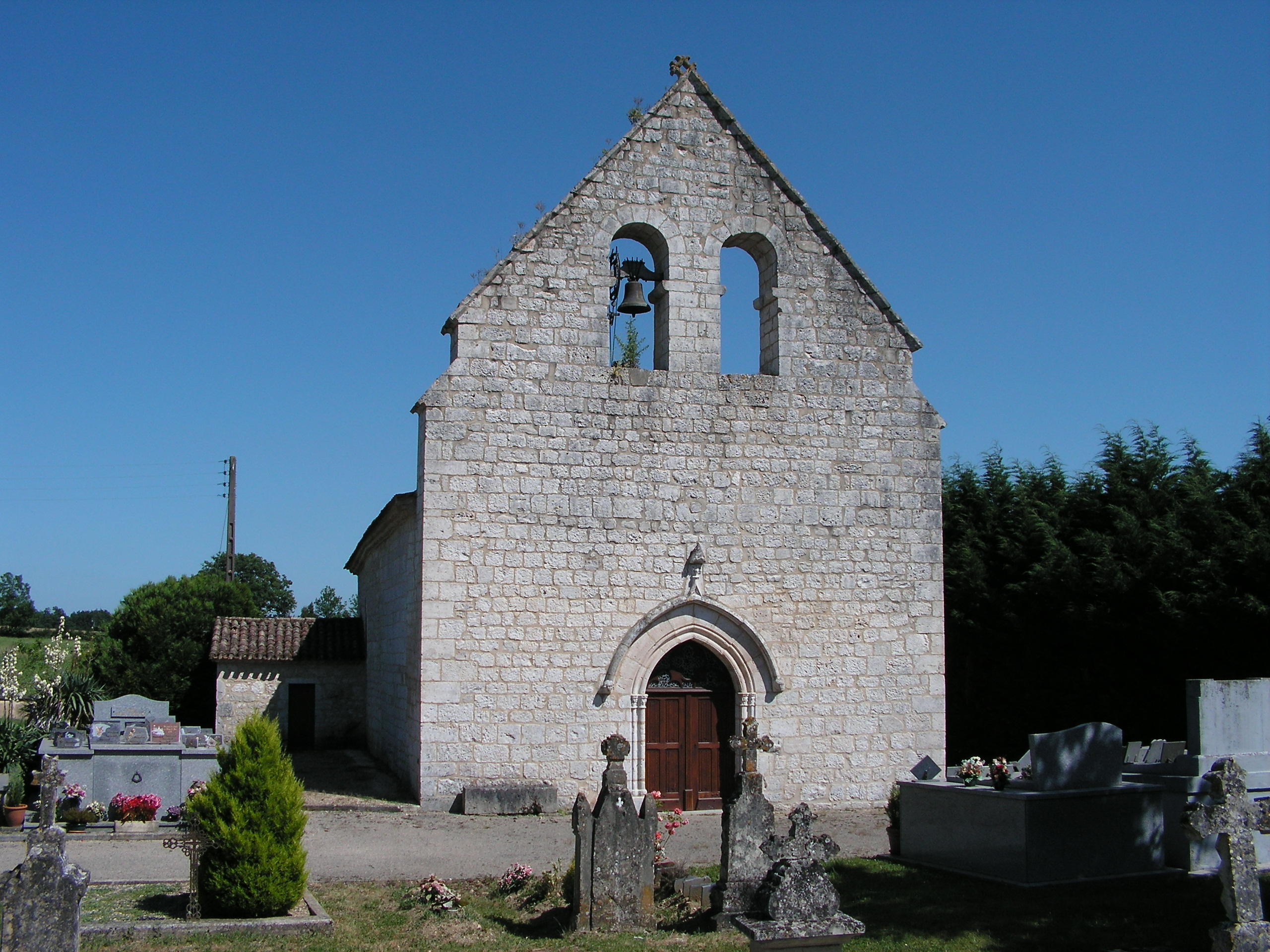
- The church in Sainte-Radegonde

- Coat of arms
- Location of Sainte-Radegonde
- Location within France Location within Nouvelle-Aquitaine
- Coordinates: 44°41′29″N 0°40′45″E
- Country: France
- Region: Nouvelle-Aquitaine
- Department: Dordogne
- Arrondissement: Bergerac
- Canton: Sud-Bergeracois

Government
  - Mayor (2020–2026): Michel Coassin
- Area^{1}: 4.81 km^{2} (1.86 sq mi)
- Elevation: 100 m (330 ft)
- Highest elevation: 113 m (371 ft)
- Lowest elevation: 72 m (236 ft)
- Population (2023): 78
  - Density: 16/km^{2} (42/sq mi)
- Time zone: UTC+01:00 (CET)
  - Summer (DST): UTC+02:00 (CEST)
- INSEE/Postal code: 24492 /24560
- ^{1} French Land Register data, which excludes lakes, ponds, glaciers > 1 km^{2} (0.386 sq mi or 247 acres) and river estuaries.

Sainte-Radegonde (French pronunciation: [sɛ̃t ʁadɡɔ̃d]; Languedocien: Senta Radegonda) is a commune in the Dordogne department in Nouvelle-Aquitaine in southwestern France.

== Population ==
Historical population
Year	Pop.	±% p.a.
1968	95	—
1975	71	−4.07%
1982	86	+2.78%
1990	76	−1.53%
1999	63	−2.06%
2007	57	−1.24%
2012	59	+0.69%
2017	62	+1.00%
2023	78	+3.90%
Source: INSEE

== See also ==
- Communes of the Dordogne department
