= Saint-Aubin-de-Cadelech =

- Commune
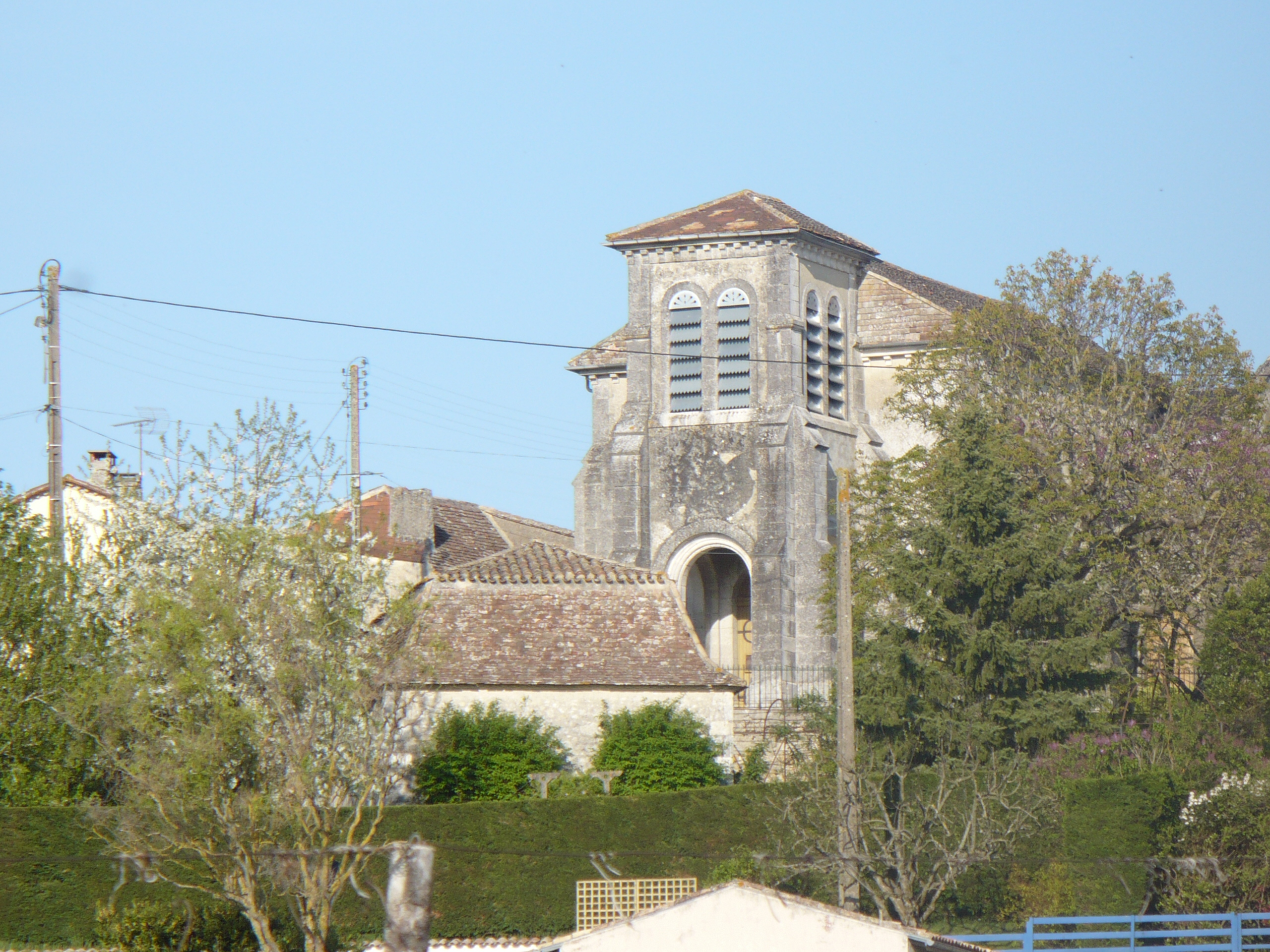
- The church in Saint-Aubin-de-Cadelech
- Location of Saint-Aubin-de-Cadelech
- Location within France Location within Nouvelle-Aquitaine
- Coordinates: 44°41′38″N 0°28′56″E
- Country: France
- Region: Nouvelle-Aquitaine
- Department: Dordogne
- Arrondissement: Bergerac
- Canton: Sud-Bergeracois

Government
  - Mayor (2020–2026): Pascal Marty
- Area^{1}: 13.66 km^{2} (5.27 sq mi)
- Elevation: 1,366 m (4,482 ft)
- Highest elevation: 171 m (561 ft)
- Lowest elevation: 53 m (174 ft)
- Population (2023): 346
  - Density: 25.3/km^{2} (65.6/sq mi)
- Time zone: UTC+01:00 (CET)
  - Summer (DST): UTC+02:00 (CEST)
- INSEE/Postal code: 24373 /24500
- ^{1} French Land Register data, which excludes lakes, ponds, glaciers > 1 km^{2} (0.386 sq mi or 247 acres) and river estuaries.

Saint-Aubin-de-Cadelech (French pronunciation: [sɛ̃.t‿obɛ̃ də kadlɛʃ]; Occitan: Sench Aubin e Cadalech) is a commune in the Dordogne department in Nouvelle-Aquitaine in southwestern France.

== Population ==
Historical population
| Year | Pop. | ±% p.a. |
|---|---|---|
| 1968 | 373 | — |
| 1975 | 331 | −1.69% |
| 1982 | 299 | −1.44% |
| 1990 | 338 | +1.54% |
| 1999 | 316 | −0.75% |
| 2007 | 315 | −0.04% |
| 2012 | 322 | +0.44% |
| 2017 | 336 | +0.85% |
| 2023 | 346 | +0.49% |
Source: INSEE

== See also ==
- Communes of the Dordogne department
