= Eymet =

- Commune
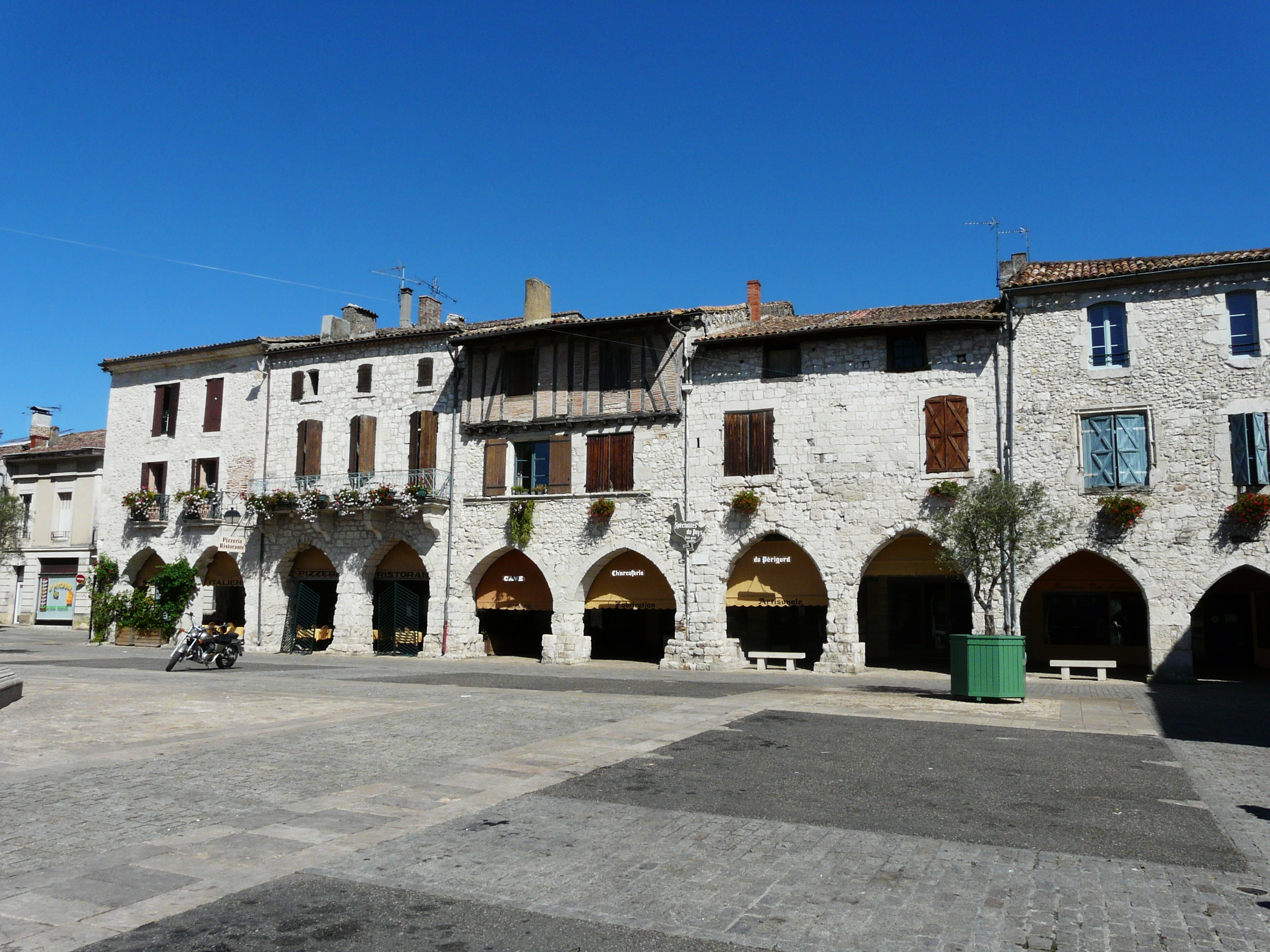
- The central square and arcades, Eymet

- Coat of arms
- Location of Eymet
- Location within France Location within Nouvelle-Aquitaine
- Coordinates: 44°40′07″N 0°23′56″E
- Country: France
- Region: Nouvelle-Aquitaine
- Department: Dordogne
- Arrondissement: Bergerac
- Canton: Sud-Bergeracois

Government
  - Mayor (2020–2026): Jérôme Bétaille
- Area^{1}: 31.25 km^{2} (12.07 sq mi)
- Elevation: 54 m (177 ft)
- Highest elevation: 133 m (436 ft)
- Lowest elevation: 41 m (135 ft)
- Population (2023): 2,569
  - Density: 82.21/km^{2} (212.9/sq mi)
- Time zone: UTC+01:00 (CET)
  - Summer (DST): UTC+02:00 (CEST)
- INSEE/Postal code: 24167 /24500
- ^{1} French Land Register data, which excludes lakes, ponds, glaciers > 1 km^{2} (0.386 sq mi or 247 acres) and river estuaries.

Eymet (French pronunciation: [ɛjmɛ]; Occitan: Aimet) is a commune in the Dordogne department in Nouvelle-Aquitaine in southwestern France.

It is notable as a popular location amongst English speaking immigrants, with Britons accounting for a quarter of the population.

== Geography ==
Eymet is situated in the Périgord region, on the river Dropt.

The Bastide was founded in 1270, by Alphonse de Poitiers, Count of Toulouse and brother of Louis IX of France. The village is situated at the extreme south of the Department of Dordogne on the CD933 between Bergerac and Marmande, around 20 kilometres (12 mi) south of Bergerac, and around 100 kilometres (62 mi) east of Bordeaux.

== Popular culture ==
During the summer of 2011, a TV production company filmed a series of reality TV programmes describing the life of various British expatriates now living in the Dordogne, with an emphasis on Eymet. The series was first shown in autumn 2011, on Monday evenings on ITV1, as twelve 30-minute episodes under the title Little England. Although it explored much of the region, some commentators found it less than exciting. Despite that, a second series was filmed in summer 2012, mainly in the area north of the Dordogne river and shown in autumn 2012 on UK's ITV.

== Population ==
Historical population
Year	Pop.	±% p.a.
1968	3,034	—
1975	2,927	−0.51%
1982	2,880	−0.23%
1990	2,769	−0.49%
1999	2,552	−0.90%
2007	2,539	−0.06%
2012	2,616	+0.60%
2017	2,630	+0.11%
2023	2,569	−0.39%
Source: INSEE

== Twin cities — sister cities ==
Eymet is twinned with:

- Grumello del Monte, Italy (2006)
- North Hatley, Quebec, Canada (2008)

== Gallery ==
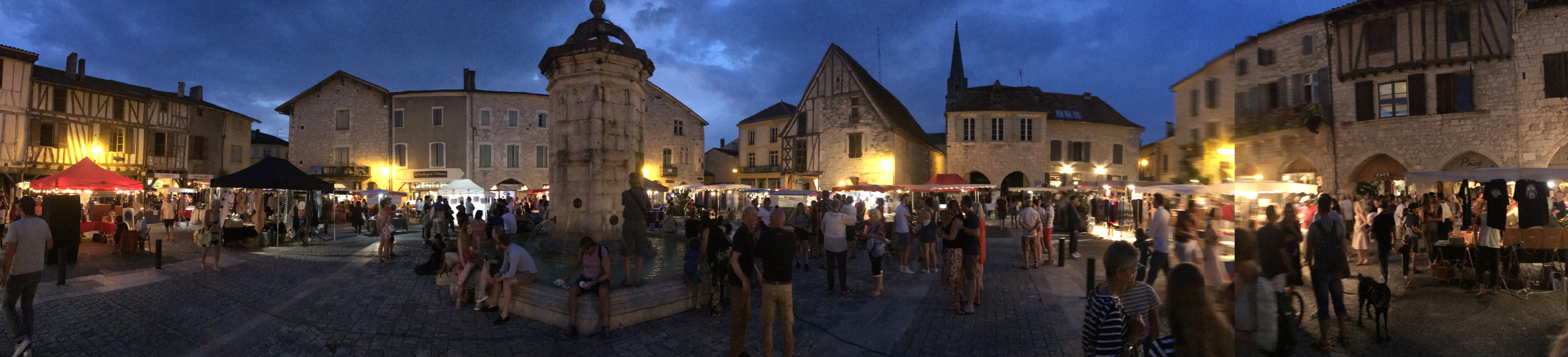
Eymet evening Market

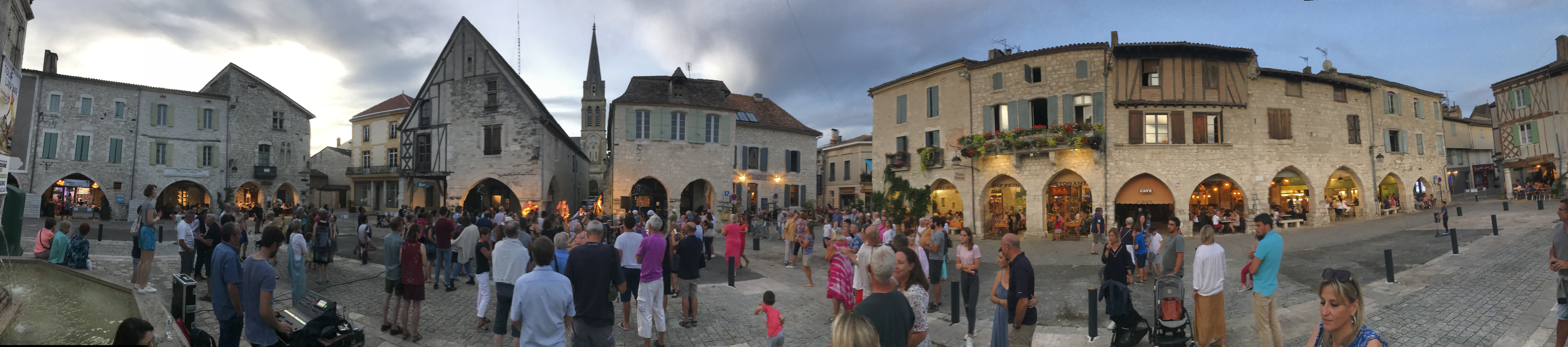
Eymet open air evening music

== See also ==
- Communes of the Dordogne department
