= Saint-Perdoux, Dordogne =

Saint-Perdoux
- Commune
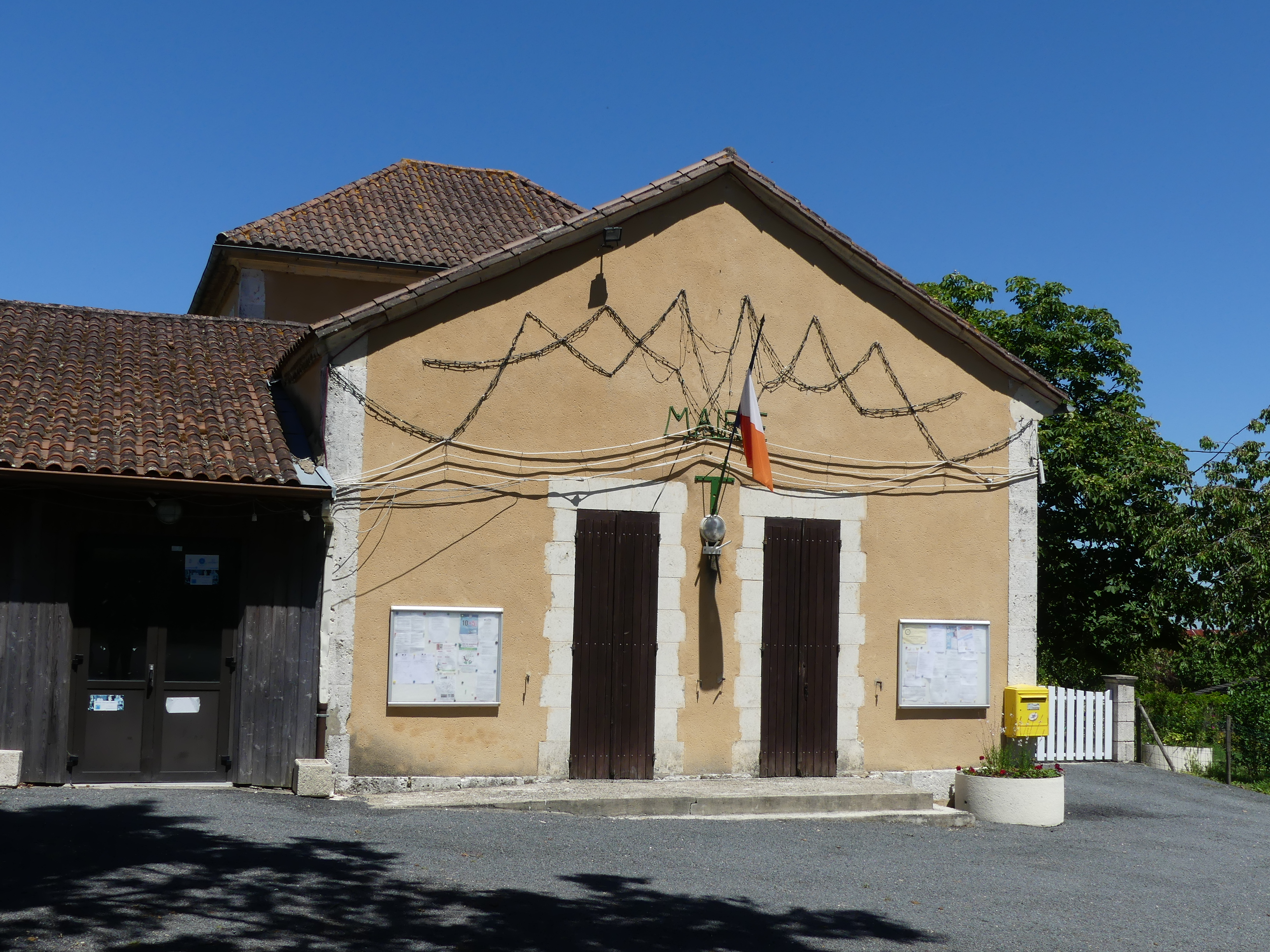
- The town hall in Saint-Perdoux
- Location of Saint-Perdoux
- Location within France Location within Nouvelle-Aquitaine
- Coordinates: 44°44′28″N 0°32′24″E
- Country: France
- Region: Nouvelle-Aquitaine
- Department: Dordogne
- Arrondissement: Bergerac
- Canton: Sud-Bergeracois

Government
  - Mayor (2020–2026): Lucien Pomedio
- Area^{1}: 7.43 km^{2} (2.87 sq mi)
- Elevation: 160 m (520 ft)
- Highest elevation: 197 m (646 ft)
- Lowest elevation: 108 m (354 ft)
- Population (2023): 143
  - Density: 19.2/km^{2} (49.8/sq mi)
- Time zone: UTC+01:00 (CET)
  - Summer (DST): UTC+02:00 (CEST)
- INSEE/Postal code: 24483 /24560
- ^{1} French Land Register data, which excludes lakes, ponds, glaciers > 1 km^{2} (0.386 sq mi or 247 acres) and river estuaries.

Saint-Perdoux (French pronunciation: [sɛ̃ pɛʁdu]; Occitan: Sent Pardol) is a commune in the Dordogne department in Nouvelle-Aquitaine in southwestern France.

== Population ==
Historical population
Year	Pop.	±% p.a.
1968	132	—
1975	122	−1.12%
1982	121	−0.12%
1990	120	−0.10%
1999	136	+1.40%
2007	133	−0.28%
2012	137	+0.59%
2017	137	+0.00%
2023	143	+0.72%
Source: INSEE

== See also ==
- Communes of the Dordogne department
