= Saint-Aubin-de-Lanquais =

- Commune
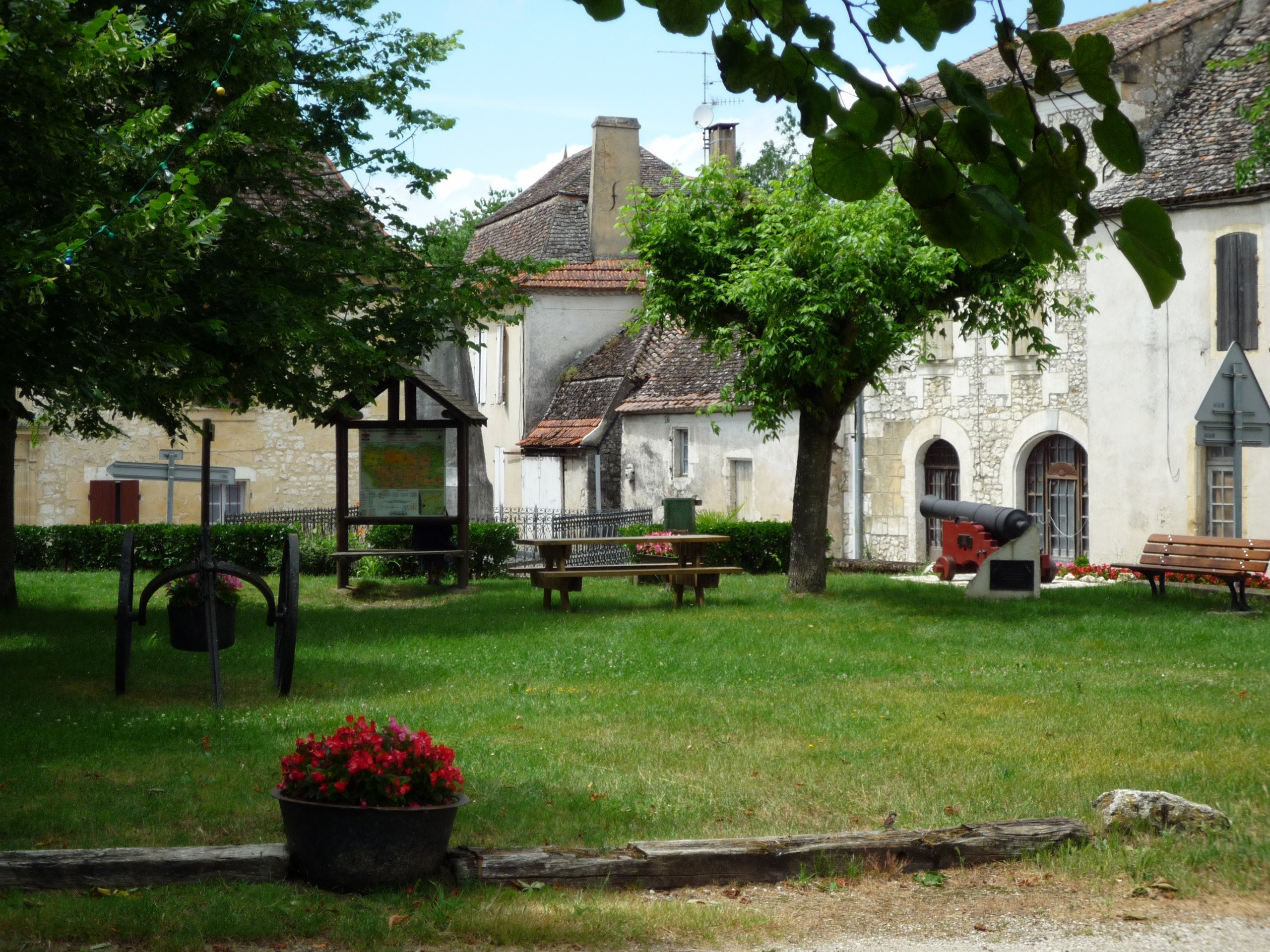
- A view within Saint-Aubin-de-Lanquais

- Coat of arms
- Location of Saint-Aubin-de-Lanquais
- Location within France Location within Nouvelle-Aquitaine
- Coordinates: 44°47′39″N 0°35′55″E
- Country: France
- Region: Nouvelle-Aquitaine
- Department: Dordogne
- Arrondissement: Bergerac
- Canton: Sud-Bergeracois

Government
  - Mayor (2020–2026): Moïse Labonne
- Area^{1}: 9.27 km^{2} (3.58 sq mi)
- Elevation: 112 m (367 ft)
- Highest elevation: 147 m (482 ft)
- Lowest elevation: 64 m (210 ft)
- Population (2023): 357
  - Density: 38.5/km^{2} (99.7/sq mi)
- Time zone: UTC+01:00 (CET)
  - Summer (DST): UTC+02:00 (CEST)
- INSEE/Postal code: 24374 /24560
- ^{1} French Land Register data, which excludes lakes, ponds, glaciers > 1 km^{2} (0.386 sq mi or 247 acres) and river estuaries.

Saint-Aubin-de-Lanquais (French pronunciation: [sɛ̃t‿obɛ̃ də lɑ̃kɛ], literally Saint-Aubin of Lanquais; Occitan: Sench Albin de Lencais) is a commune in the Dordogne department in Nouvelle-Aquitaine in southwestern France.

== Population ==
Historical population
Year	Pop.	±% p.a.
1968	270	—
1975	247	−1.26%
1982	220	−1.64%
1990	232	+0.67%
1999	256	+1.10%
2007	265	+0.43%
2012	313	+3.39%
2017	343	+1.85%
2023	357	+0.67%
Source: INSEE

== See also ==
- Communes of the Dordogne department
