= Issigeac =

Issigeac Sijac (Occitan)
- Commune
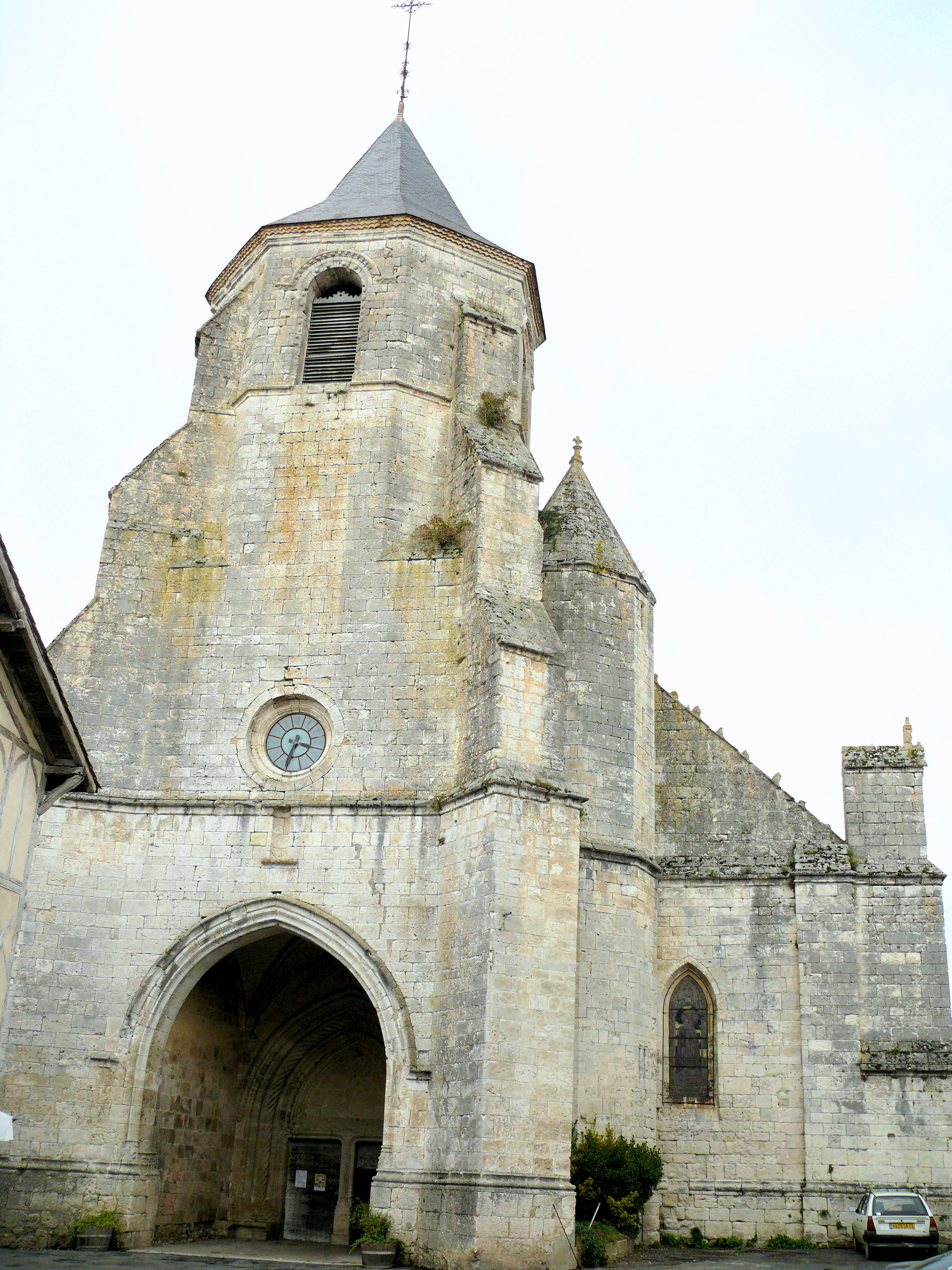
- The church in Issigeac

- Coat of arms
- Location of Issigeac
- Location within France Location within Nouvelle-Aquitaine
- Coordinates: 44°43′48″N 0°36′25″E
- Country: France
- Region: Nouvelle-Aquitaine
- Department: Dordogne
- Arrondissement: Bergerac
- Canton: Sud-Bergeracois

Government
  - Mayor (2020–2026): Jean-Claude Castagner
- Area^{1}: 9.50 km^{2} (3.67 sq mi)
- Highest elevation: 166 m (545 ft)
- Lowest elevation: 94 m (308 ft)
- Population (2023): 744
  - Density: 78.3/km^{2} (203/sq mi)
- Time zone: UTC+01:00 (CET)
  - Summer (DST): UTC+02:00 (CEST)
- INSEE/Postal code: 24212 /24560
- ^{1} French Land Register data, which excludes lakes, ponds, glaciers > 1 km^{2} (0.386 sq mi or 247 acres) and river estuaries.

Issigeac (French pronunciation: [isiʒak]; Occitan: Sijac) is a small medieval village that dates back to Roman times, located in the Périgord. It is located about 20 km (12 mi) southeast of Bergerac in Nouvelle-Aquitaine in southwestern France and is a commune of the Dordogne department.

A village with roots in antiquity, today it the quaint region features timbered houses circling the church and Bishop's Palace (17th century). The village is circular in plan with most buildings of medieval half-timbered style (most are original) and still retains much of its 13th-century walls. In 1438 it was pillaged by Rodrigo de Villandrando.

The village is set in the midst of wine country, and is part of the Bergerac wine-growing region.

Throughout the year, the village hosts a number of festivals and events and has a thriving market on Sunday mornings, where many gastronomic products are available as well as a selection of local wines, meats, fruit and vegetables brought directly to the market by their producers.

== Population ==
Historical population
Year	Pop.	±% p.a.
1968	709	—
1975	669	−0.83%
1982	686	+0.36%
1990	638	−0.90%
1999	617	−0.37%
2007	663	+0.90%
2012	728	+1.89%
2017	757	+0.78%
2023	744	−0.29%
Source: INSEE

== See also ==
- Communes of the Dordogne department
