= Saussignac AOC =

Wine appellation in South West France

Coordinates: 44°49′N 0°20′E

Saussignac (French pronunciation: [sosiɲak]) is a wine appellation (Appellation d'origine contrôlée, AOC) in South West France. The Saussignac AOC is used exclusively for a sweet white dessert wine, similar to Monbazillac but a little drier. The grapes used are generally Sémillon grapes which have been affected by Botrytis cinerea. To qualify for the appellation, the grapes must be grown, and the wine produced, in the four communes of Saussignac, Razac-de-Saussignac, Monestier and Gageac-et-Rouillac. A fundamental difference between Saussignac and all other sweet or late-harvest wines is that chaptalization, or the addition of sugar, is forbidden under the rules of the AOC.

== External links ==
- AOC Saussignac - Avenue des Vins
