= Gageac =

Gageac may refer to:

- La Roque-Gageac, commune in the Dordogne
- Gageac-et-Rouillac, commune in the Dordogne
- Château de Gageac, castle in Gageac-et-Rouillac
