= Gageac-et-Rouillac =

- Commune
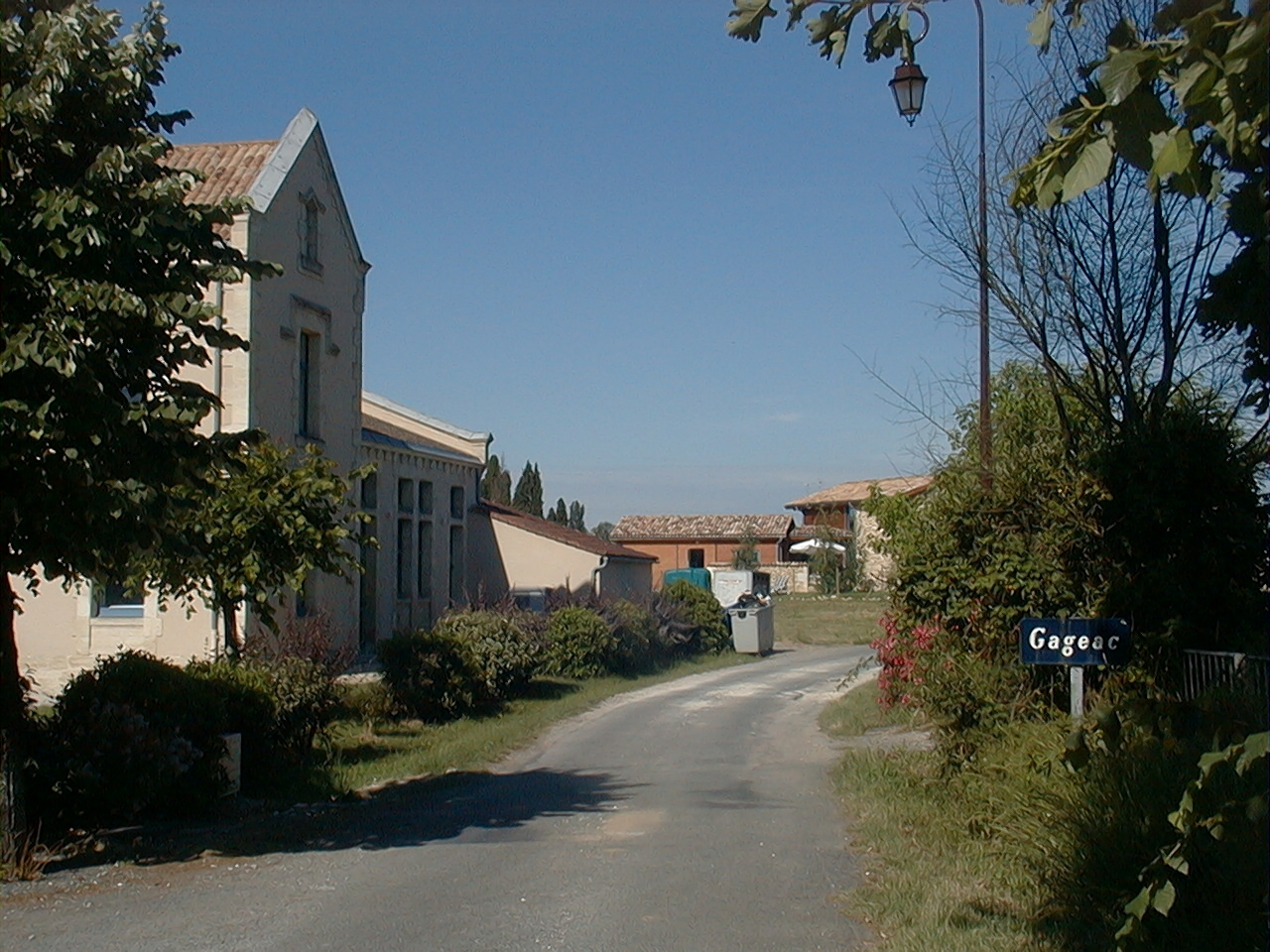
- The road into Gageac

- Coat of arms
- Location of Gageac-et-Rouillac
- Location within France Location within Nouvelle-Aquitaine
- Coordinates: 44°48′01″N 0°20′44″E
- Country: France
- Region: Nouvelle-Aquitaine
- Department: Dordogne
- Arrondissement: Bergerac
- Canton: Sud-Bergeracois
- Intercommunality: CA Bergeracoise

Government
  - Mayor (2020–2026): Philippe Puyponchet
- Area^{1}: 13.99 km^{2} (5.40 sq mi)
- Elevation: 120 m (390 ft)
- Highest elevation: 146 m (479 ft)
- Lowest elevation: 29 m (95 ft)
- Population (2023): 422
  - Density: 30.2/km^{2} (78.1/sq mi)
- Time zone: UTC+01:00 (CET)
  - Summer (DST): UTC+02:00 (CEST)
- INSEE/Postal code: 24193 /24240
- ^{1} French Land Register data, which excludes lakes, ponds, glaciers > 1 km^{2} (0.386 sq mi or 247 acres) and river estuaries.

Gageac-et-Rouillac (French pronunciation: [ɡaʒak e ʁujak]; Occitan: Gajac e Rolhàs) is a commune in the Dordogne department in Nouvelle-Aquitaine in southwestern France.

A scattered village consisting of many small hamlets. Gageac is now the main village with the Mairie whilst Rouillac has the ancient Carthusian monastery, now a private house and stand on a hill with excellent views across the Dordogne valley. The 15th-16th century Château de Gageac is a listed monument. The commune is part of the Bergerac wine-growing region.

== Geography ==
=== General ===
In the Bergerac region, in the southwest quarter of the Dordogne department, Gageac-et-Rouillac is a rural commune watered by the Gardonnette River. It is part of the greater Bergerac area.

Away from the main roads, the village of Gageac-et-Rouillac is located, as the crow flies, eleven kilometers east-southeast of Sainte-Foy-la-Grande, twelve kilometers southwest of Bergerac city center, and fifteen kilometers north-northwest of the fortified town of Eymet.

The commune is served by departmental roads D14 and D15.

Between Saussignac and Cunèges, then Pomport, a section shared by the GR 6 and GR 654 West long-distance hiking trails crosses the commune for three and a half kilometers.

=== Geology ===
Located on the northern plate of the Aquitaine Basin and bordered to its northeast by a fringe of the Massif Central, the Dordogne department exhibits great geological diversity. The terrain is arranged in regular strata at depth, evidence of sedimentation on this ancient marine platform. The department can thus be geologically divided into four distinct terraces, differentiated according to their geological age. Gageac-et-Rouillac is situated in the fourth terrace from the northeast, a plateau formed of siliceous-sandy deposits and lacustrine limestones from the Tertiary period.

The outcropping layers within the municipal territory consist of Quaternary surface formations and sedimentary rocks dating from the Cenozoic era. The oldest formation, designated e6b, is composed of lower molasse (predominantly clayey facies) (Upper Continental Bartonian). The most recent formation, designated CFp, is one of the undifferentiated colluvial surface formations found on slopes, in valleys, and on plateaus, derived from alluvium, molasse, and weathered rock. A detailed description of these layers is provided in sheets "no. 805 - Sainte-Foy-la-Grande" and "no. 806 - Bergerac" of the 1:50,000 geological map of metropolitan France and their associated explanatory notes.

Geological map of Gageac-et-Rouillac.

== Population ==
Historical population
Year	Pop.	±% p.a.
1968	451	—
1975	356	−3.32%
1982	395	+1.50%
1990	440	+1.36%
1999	435	−0.13%
2007	452	+0.48%
2012	427	−1.13%
2017	465	+1.72%
2023	422	−1.60%
Source: INSEE

== See also ==
- Communes of the Dordogne department
