= Bouniagues =

- Commune
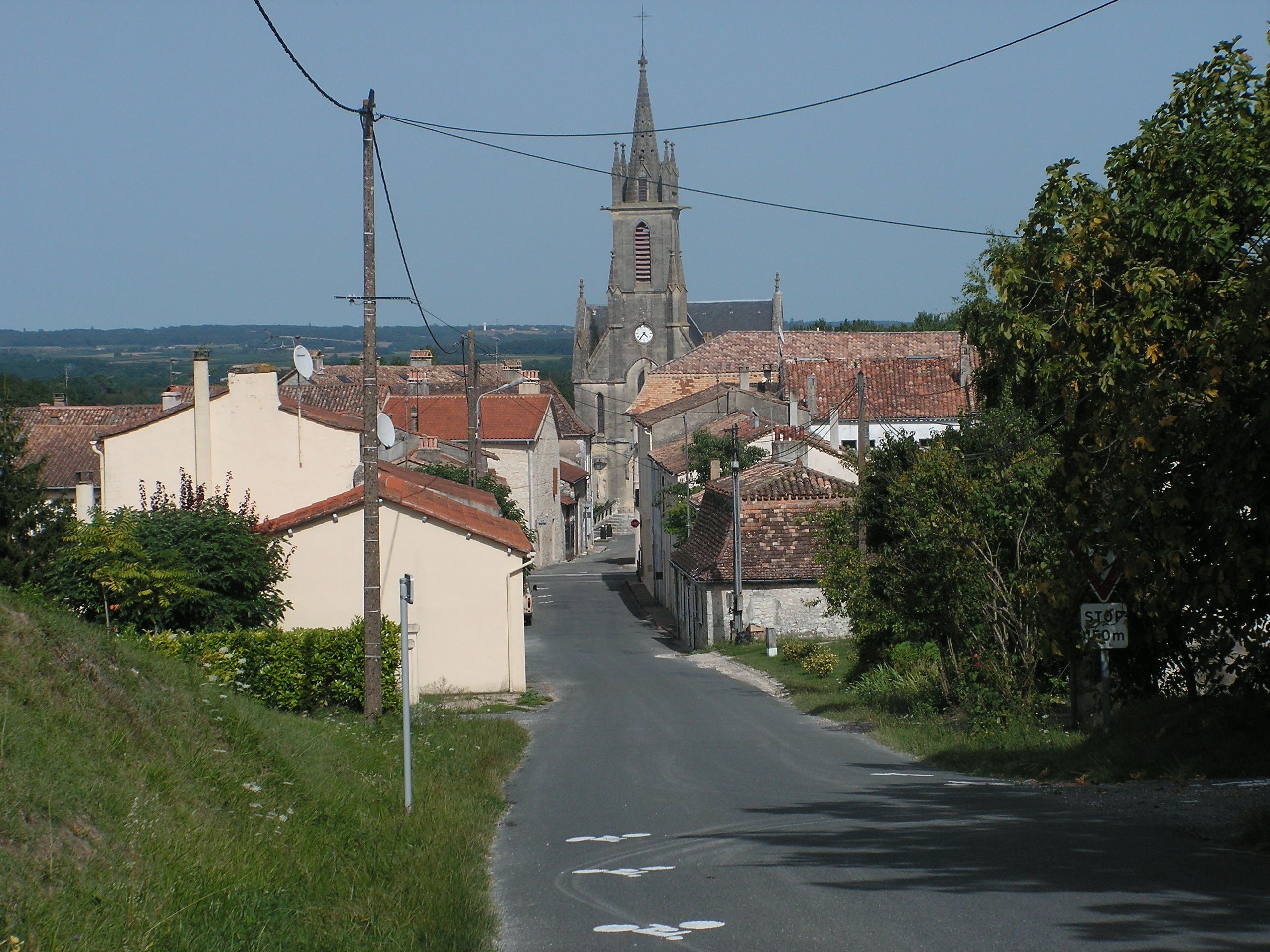
- A general view of Bouniagues

- Coat of arms
- Location of Bouniagues
- Location within France Location within Nouvelle-Aquitaine
- Coordinates: 44°45′35″N 0°31′40″E
- Country: France
- Region: Nouvelle-Aquitaine
- Department: Dordogne
- Arrondissement: Bergerac
- Canton: Sud-Bergeracois
- Intercommunality: CA Bergeracoise

Government
  - Mayor (2020–2026): Georges Bassi
- Area^{1}: 8.62 km^{2} (3.33 sq mi)
- Elevation: 130 m (430 ft)
- Highest elevation: 181 m (594 ft)
- Lowest elevation: 74 m (243 ft)
- Population (2023): 578
  - Density: 67.1/km^{2} (174/sq mi)
- Time zone: UTC+01:00 (CET)
  - Summer (DST): UTC+02:00 (CEST)
- INSEE/Postal code: 24054 /24560
- ^{1} French Land Register data, which excludes lakes, ponds, glaciers > 1 km^{2} (0.386 sq mi or 247 acres) and river estuaries.

Bouniagues (French pronunciation: [bunjaɡ]; Occitan: Bonhagas) is a commune in the Dordogne department in southwestern France.

== Population ==
Historical population
| Year | Pop. | ±% p.a. |
|---|---|---|
| 1968 | 349 | — |
| 1975 | 378 | +1.15% |
| 1982 | 447 | +2.42% |
| 1990 | 466 | +0.52% |
| 1999 | 476 | +0.24% |
| 2007 | 489 | +0.34% |
| 2012 | 552 | +2.45% |
| 2017 | 587 | +1.24% |
| 2023 | 578 | −0.26% |
Source: INSEE

== See also ==
- Communes of the Dordogne département
- Château de l'Herm
