= John Bost =

Swiss musician and painter

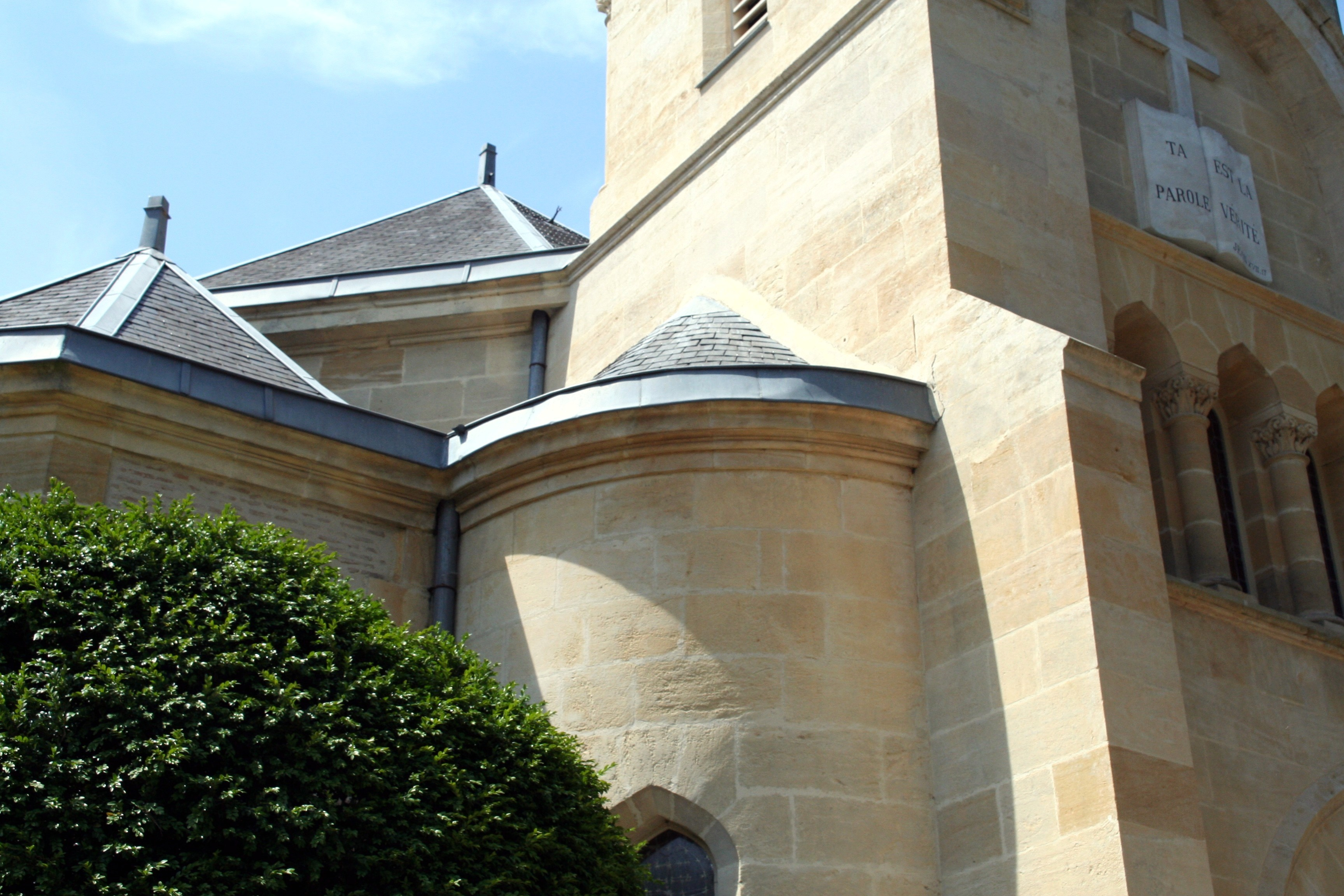
One of the churches built by Bost

Jean Antoine Bost (March 4, 1817 in Moutier-Grandval, canton of Bern-1 November 1881) was a French-Swiss Calvinist pastor and musician. His father, Ami Bost, was also a pastor. He learned the piano with Franz Liszt.

In 1840, he gave up his musical career and became a pastor in La Force, village of the Dordogne valley of France. In 1846, he inaugurated there a new temple and decided to build the asylum of his dreams by that temple. 'La Famille' (the Family) was inaugurated on May 24, 1848. It was immediately made available to children, orphans, disabled and incurables. He created 9 asylums during his lifetime. In 1861, he married Eugénie Ponterie.

He was elected a member of the American Philosophical Society in 1864.

The asylum has since flourished to become the John Bost Foundation where over 1000 people with a wide variety of disabilities live.
