= Ginestet =

- Commune
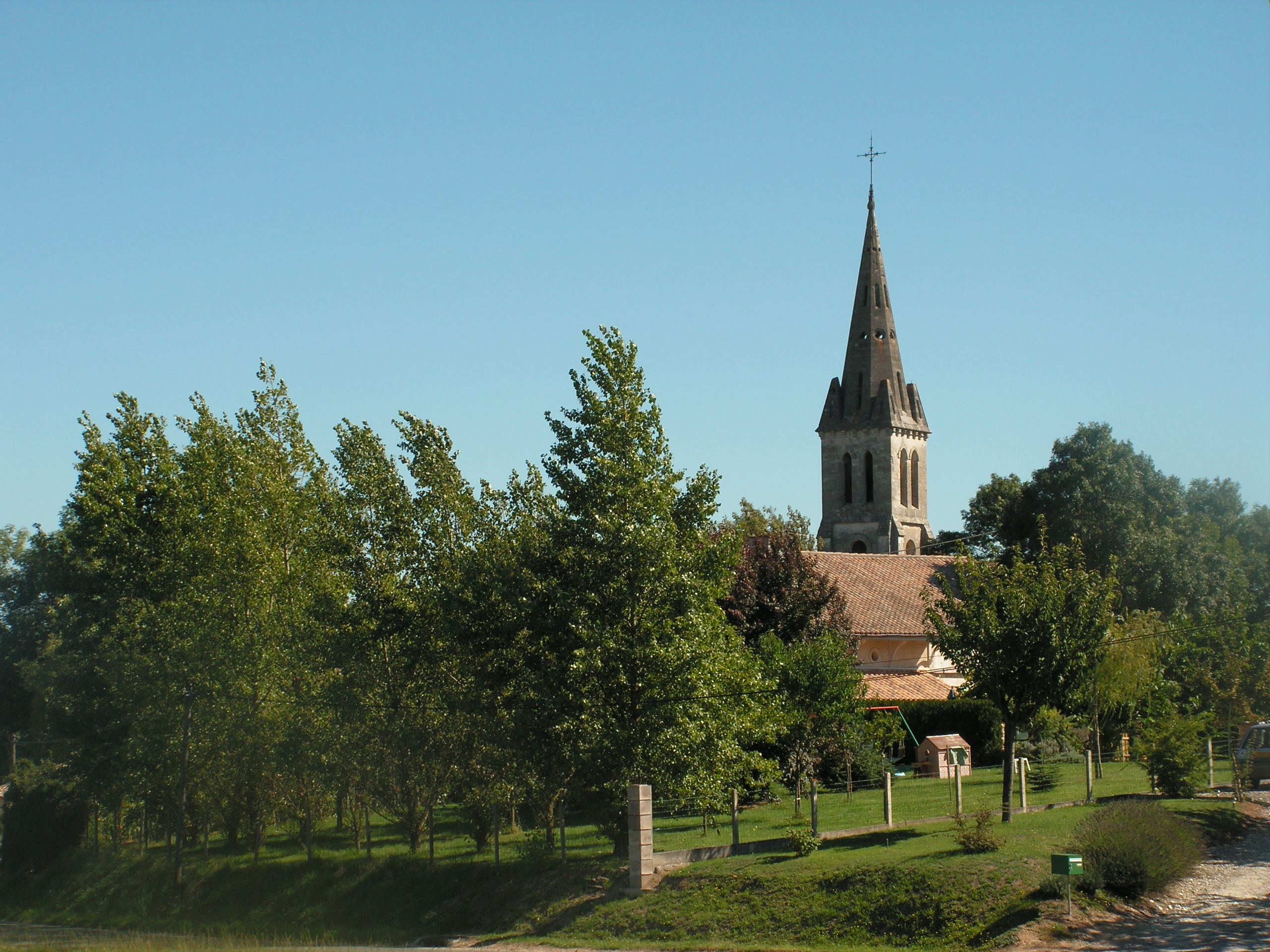
- The church of Ginestet

- Coat of arms
- Location of Ginestet
- Location within France Location within Nouvelle-Aquitaine
- Coordinates: 44°54′45″N 0°25′49″E
- Country: France
- Region: Nouvelle-Aquitaine
- Department: Dordogne
- Arrondissement: Bergerac
- Canton: Pays de la Force
- Intercommunality: CA Bergeracoise

Government
  - Mayor (2020–2026): Michel Martinet
- Area^{1}: 13.06 km^{2} (5.04 sq mi)
- Elevation: 120 m (390 ft)
- Highest elevation: 140 m (460 ft)
- Lowest elevation: 45 m (148 ft)
- Population (2023): 762
  - Density: 58.3/km^{2} (151/sq mi)
- Time zone: UTC+01:00 (CET)
  - Summer (DST): UTC+02:00 (CEST)
- INSEE/Postal code: 24197 /24130
- ^{1} French Land Register data, which excludes lakes, ponds, glaciers > 1 km^{2} (0.386 sq mi or 247 acres) and river estuaries.

Ginestet (French pronunciation: [ʒinɛstɛ]; Occitan: Gè) is a commune in the Dordogne department in Nouvelle-Aquitaine in southwestern France.

== Population ==
Historical population
Year	Pop.	±% p.a.
1968	385	—
1975	415	+1.08%
1982	549	+4.08%
1990	708	+3.23%
1999	737	+0.45%
2007	828	+1.47%
2012	753	−1.88%
2017	729	−0.65%
2023	762	+0.74%
Source: INSEE

== See also ==
- Communes of the Dordogne department
