= Canton of Pays de la Force =

Coordinates: 44.86°N 0.40°E

The canton of Pays de la Force is an administrative division of the Dordogne department, southwestern France. It was created at the French canton reorganisation which came into effect in March 2015. Its seat is in Prigonrieux.

It consists of the following communes:

1. Bosset
2. Le Fleix
3. La Force
4. Fraisse
5. Gardonne
6. Ginestet
7. Lamonzie-Saint-Martin
8. Lunas
9. Monfaucon
10. Prigonrieux
11. Saint-Georges-Blancaneix
12. Saint-Géry
13. Saint-Laurent-des-Vignes
14. Saint-Pierre-d'Eyraud
