= Lamonzie-Saint-Martin station =

Railway station in Lamonzie-Saint-Martin, France

Coordinates: 44°50′36″N 0°22′49″E

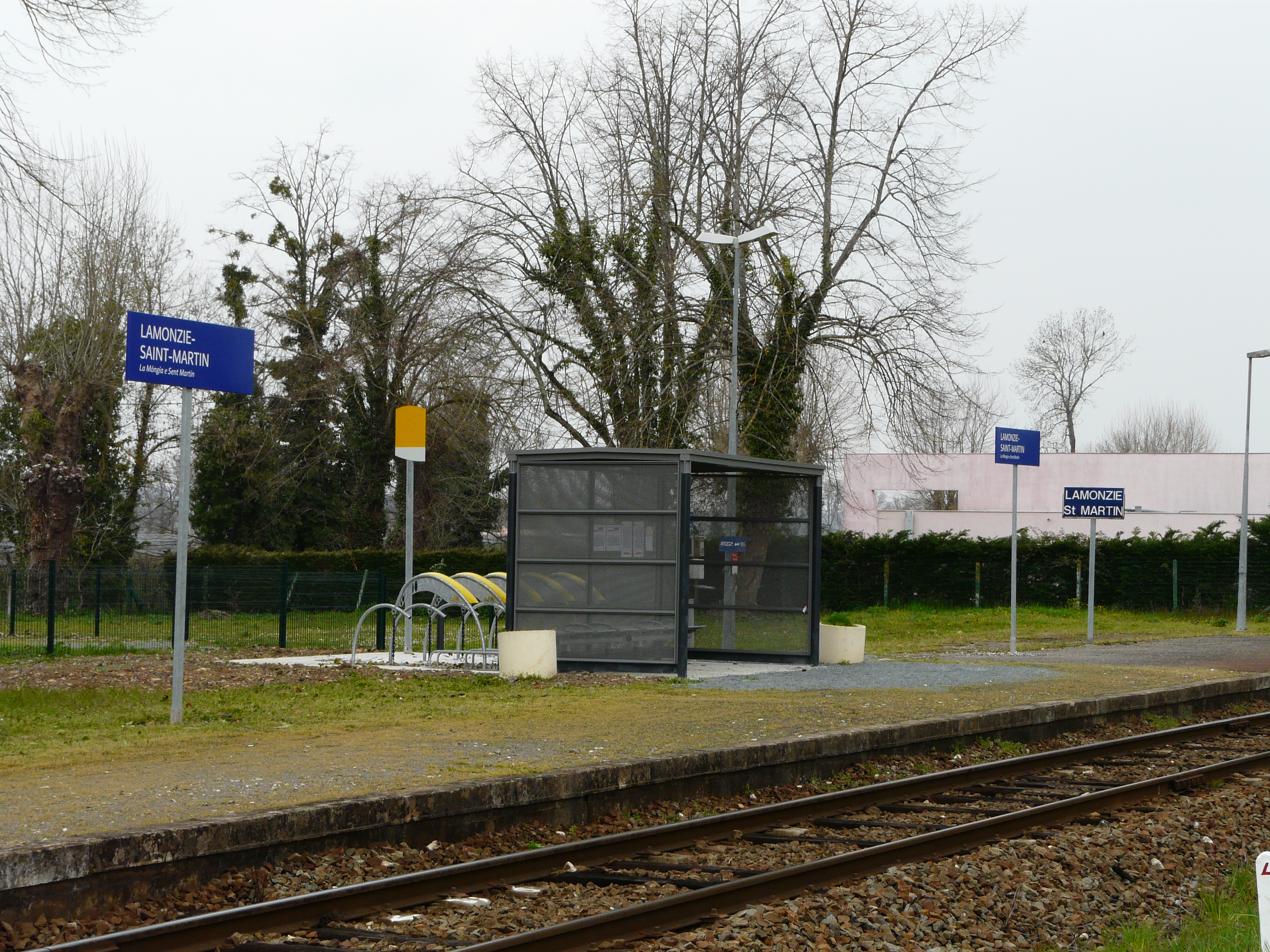
Lamonzie-Saint-Martin station

Lamonzie-Saint-Martin is a railway station in Lamonzie-Saint-Martin, Nouvelle-Aquitaine, France. The station is located on the Libourne - Le Buisson railway line. The station is served by TER (local) services operated by SNCF.

== Train services ==
The following services currently call at Lamonzie-Saint-Martin:

- local service (TER Nouvelle-Aquitaine) Bordeaux - Libourne - Bergerac - Sarlat-la-Canéda

Preceding station	TER Nouvelle-Aquitaine	Following station
Gardonne towards Bordeaux	33	Bergerac towards Sarlat-la-Canéda
