= Fraisse =

- Commune
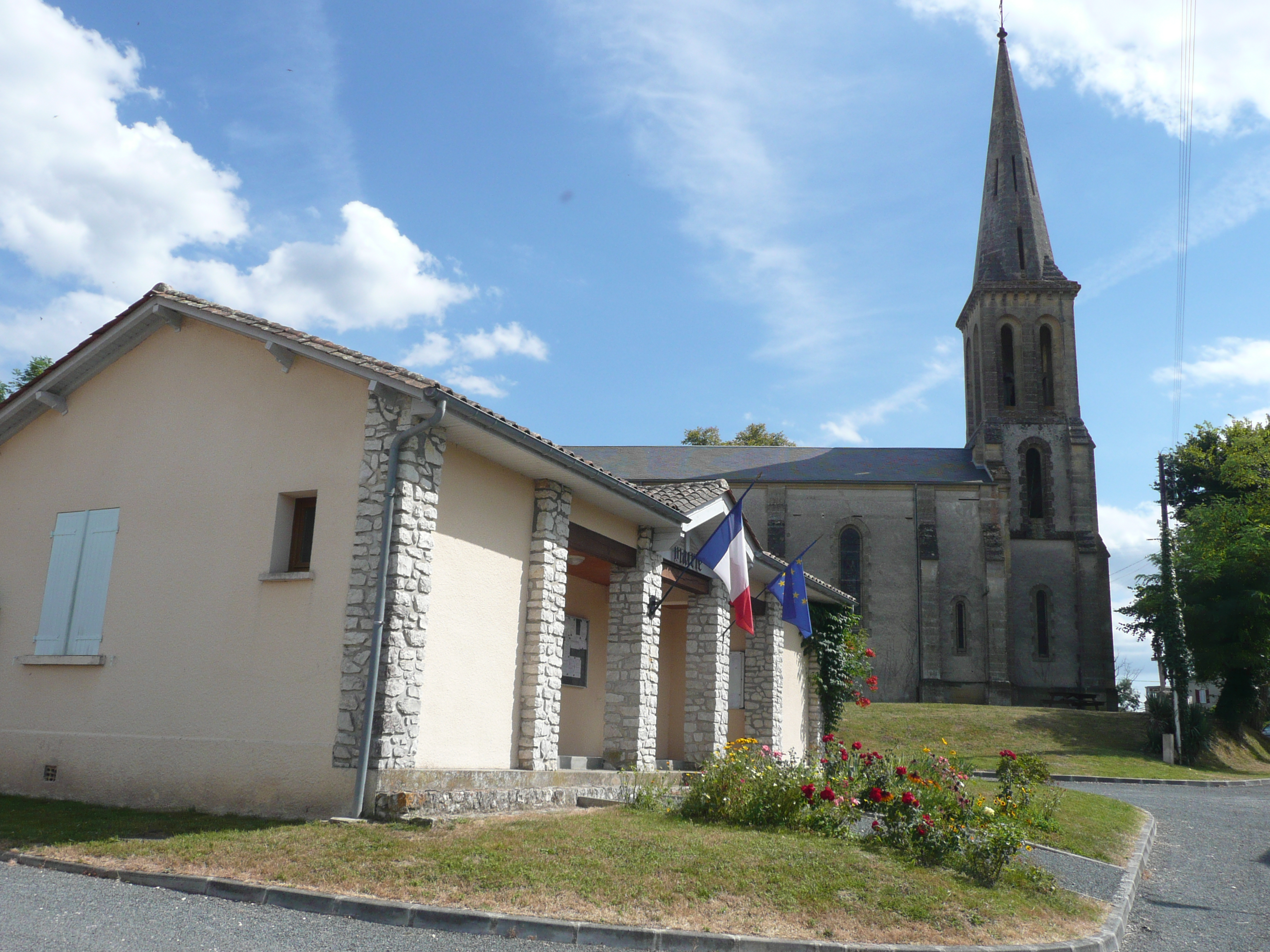
- The town hall and church in Fraisse

- Coat of arms
- Location of Fraisse
- Location within France Location within Nouvelle-Aquitaine
- Coordinates: 44°55′50″N 0°18′30″E
- Country: France
- Region: Nouvelle-Aquitaine
- Department: Dordogne
- Arrondissement: Bergerac
- Canton: Pays de la Force
- Intercommunality: CA Bergeracoise

Government
  - Mayor (2020–2026): Christophe Gauthier
- Area^{1}: 21.5 km^{2} (8.3 sq mi)
- Elevation: 100 m (330 ft)
- Highest elevation: 135 m (443 ft)
- Lowest elevation: 39 m (128 ft)
- Population (2023): 171
  - Density: 7.95/km^{2} (20.6/sq mi)
- Time zone: UTC+01:00 (CET)
  - Summer (DST): UTC+02:00 (CEST)
- INSEE/Postal code: 24191 /24130
- ^{1} French Land Register data, which excludes lakes, ponds, glaciers > 1 km^{2} (0.386 sq mi or 247 acres) and river estuaries.

Fraisse (French pronunciation: [fʁɛs]) is a commune in the Dordogne department in Nouvelle-Aquitaine in southwestern France.

== Population ==
Historical population
| Year | Pop. | ±% p.a. |
|---|---|---|
| 1968 | 170 | — |
| 1975 | 140 | −2.74% |
| 1982 | 129 | −1.16% |
| 1990 | 120 | −0.90% |
| 1999 | 157 | +3.03% |
| 2007 | 151 | −0.49% |
| 2012 | 154 | +0.39% |
| 2017 | 172 | +2.24% |
| 2023 | 171 | −0.10% |
Source: INSEE

== See also ==
- Communes of the Dordogne department
