= Gardonne =

- Commune
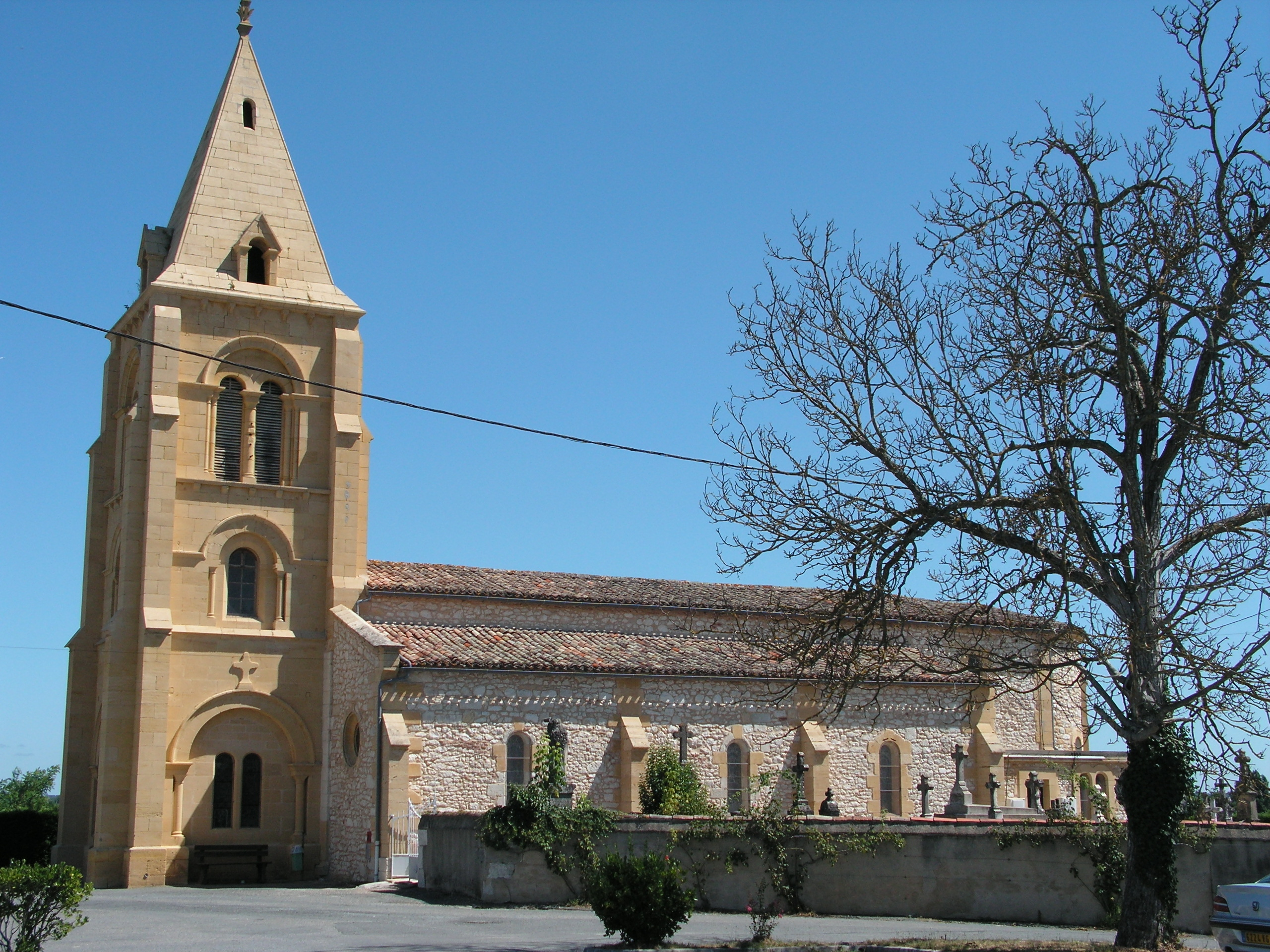
- The church in Gardonne

- Coat of arms
- Location of Gardonne
- Location within France Location within Nouvelle-Aquitaine
- Coordinates: 44°50′15″N 0°19′59″E
- Country: France
- Region: Nouvelle-Aquitaine
- Department: Dordogne
- Arrondissement: Bergerac
- Canton: Pays de la Force
- Intercommunality: CA Bergeracoise

Government
  - Mayor (2020–2026): Pascal Delteil
- Area^{1}: 8.26 km^{2} (3.19 sq mi)
- Elevation: 32 m (105 ft)
- Highest elevation: 35 m (115 ft)
- Lowest elevation: 10 m (33 ft)
- Population (2023): 1,608
  - Density: 195/km^{2} (504/sq mi)
- Time zone: UTC+01:00 (CET)
  - Summer (DST): UTC+02:00 (CEST)
- INSEE/Postal code: 24194 /24680
- ^{1} French Land Register data, which excludes lakes, ponds, glaciers > 1 km^{2} (0.386 sq mi or 247 acres) and river estuaries.

Gardonne (French pronunciation: [ɡaʁdɔn]; Occitan: Gardona) is a commune in the Dordogne department in Nouvelle-Aquitaine in southwestern France. Gardonne station has rail connections to Bordeaux, Bergerac and Sarlat-la-Canéda.

== Population ==
Historical population
Year	Pop.	±% p.a.
1968	988	—
1975	1,115	+1.74%
1982	1,130	+0.19%
1990	1,383	+2.56%
1999	1,404	+0.17%
2007	1,347	−0.52%
2012	1,520	+2.45%
2017	1,592	+0.93%
2023	1,608	+0.17%
Source: INSEE

== See also ==
- Communes of the Dordogne department
