= Saint-Pierre-d'Eyraud =

- Commune
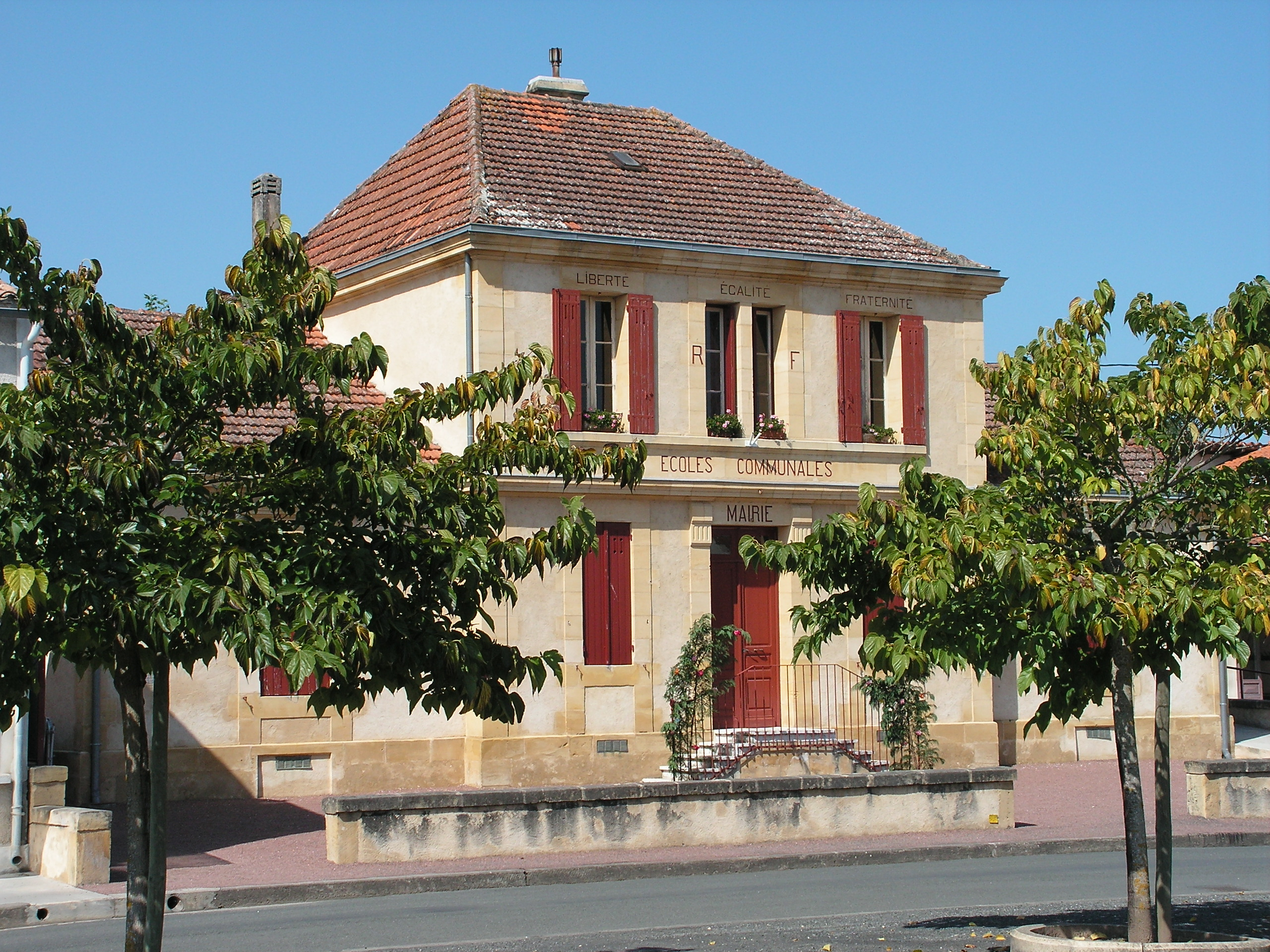
- Town hall
- Location of Saint-Pierre-d'Eyraud
- Location within France Location within Nouvelle-Aquitaine
- Coordinates: 44°50′57″N 0°19′10″E
- Country: France
- Region: Nouvelle-Aquitaine
- Department: Dordogne
- Arrondissement: Bergerac
- Canton: Pays de la Force
- Intercommunality: CA Bergeracoise

Government
  - Mayor (2020–2026): Jean-Pierre Faure
- Area^{1}: 26.16 km^{2} (10.10 sq mi)
- Elevation: 20 m (66 ft)
- Highest elevation: 111 m (364 ft)
- Lowest elevation: 6 m (20 ft)
- Population (2023): 1,795
  - Density: 68.62/km^{2} (177.7/sq mi)
- Time zone: UTC+01:00 (CET)
  - Summer (DST): UTC+02:00 (CEST)
- INSEE/Postal code: 24487 /24130
- ^{1} French Land Register data, which excludes lakes, ponds, glaciers > 1 km^{2} (0.386 sq mi or 247 acres) and river estuaries.

Saint-Pierre-d'Eyraud (French pronunciation: [sɛ̃ pjɛʁ deʁo]; Occitan: Sent Pèir d'Eiraud) is a commune in the Dordogne department in Nouvelle-Aquitaine in southwestern France.

== Population ==
Historical population
Year	Pop.	±% p.a.
1968	1,358	—
1975	1,294	−0.69%
1982	1,366	+0.78%
1990	1,476	+0.97%
1999	1,480	+0.03%
2007	1,613	+1.08%
2012	1,741	+1.54%
2017	1,795	+0.61%
2023	1,795	+0.00%
Source: INSEE

== See also ==
- Communes of the Dordogne department
