= Saint-Laurent-des-Vignes =

- Commune
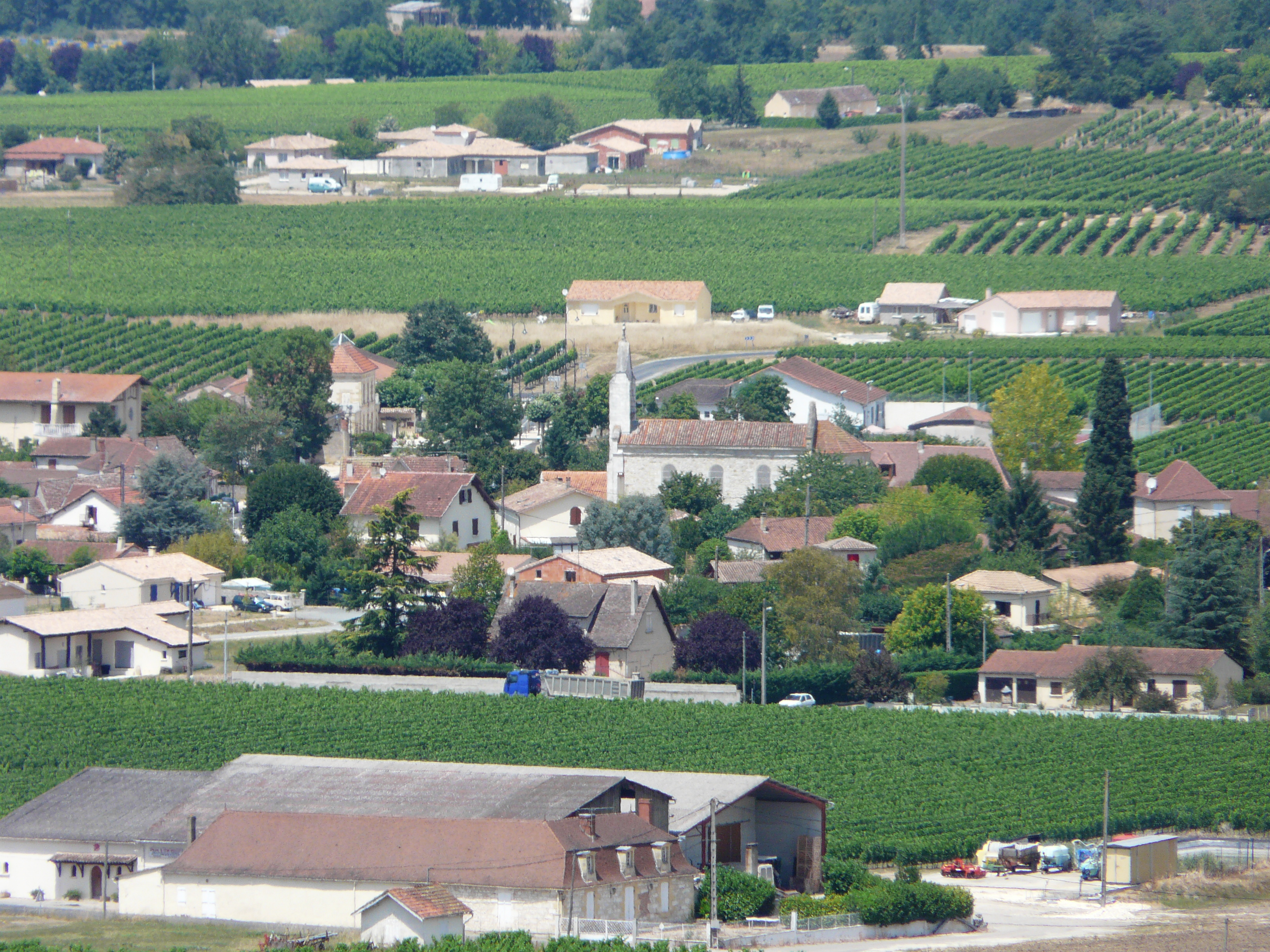
- A general view of Saint-Laurent-des-Vignes

- Coat of arms
- Location of Saint-Laurent-des-Vignes
- Location within France Location within Nouvelle-Aquitaine
- Coordinates: 44°49′01″N 0°27′20″E
- Country: France
- Region: Nouvelle-Aquitaine
- Department: Dordogne
- Arrondissement: Bergerac
- Canton: Pays de la Force
- Intercommunality: CA Bergeracoise

Government
  - Mayor (2020–2026): Jean-Claude Portolan
- Area^{1}: 8.08 km^{2} (3.12 sq mi)
- Elevation: 50 m (160 ft)
- Highest elevation: 59 m (194 ft)
- Lowest elevation: 12 m (39 ft)
- Population (2023): 1,038
  - Density: 128/km^{2} (333/sq mi)
- Time zone: UTC+01:00 (CET)
  - Summer (DST): UTC+02:00 (CEST)
- INSEE/Postal code: 24437 /24100
- ^{1} French Land Register data, which excludes lakes, ponds, glaciers > 1 km^{2} (0.386 sq mi or 247 acres) and river estuaries.

Saint-Laurent-des-Vignes (French pronunciation: [sɛ̃ loʁɑ̃ de viɲ]; Occitan: Sent Laurenç dei Vinhas) is a commune in the Dordogne department of Nouvelle-Aquitaine in southwestern France.

== Population ==
Historical population
Year	Pop.	±% p.a.
1968	525	—
1975	531	+0.16%
1982	603	+1.83%
1990	709	+2.04%
1999	732	+0.36%
2007	729	−0.05%
2012	880	+3.84%
2017	886	+0.14%
2023	1,038	+2.67%
Source: INSEE

== See also ==
- Communes of the Dordogne department
