= Communauté d'agglomération Bergeracoise =

Bergeracoise
- Communauté d'agglomération
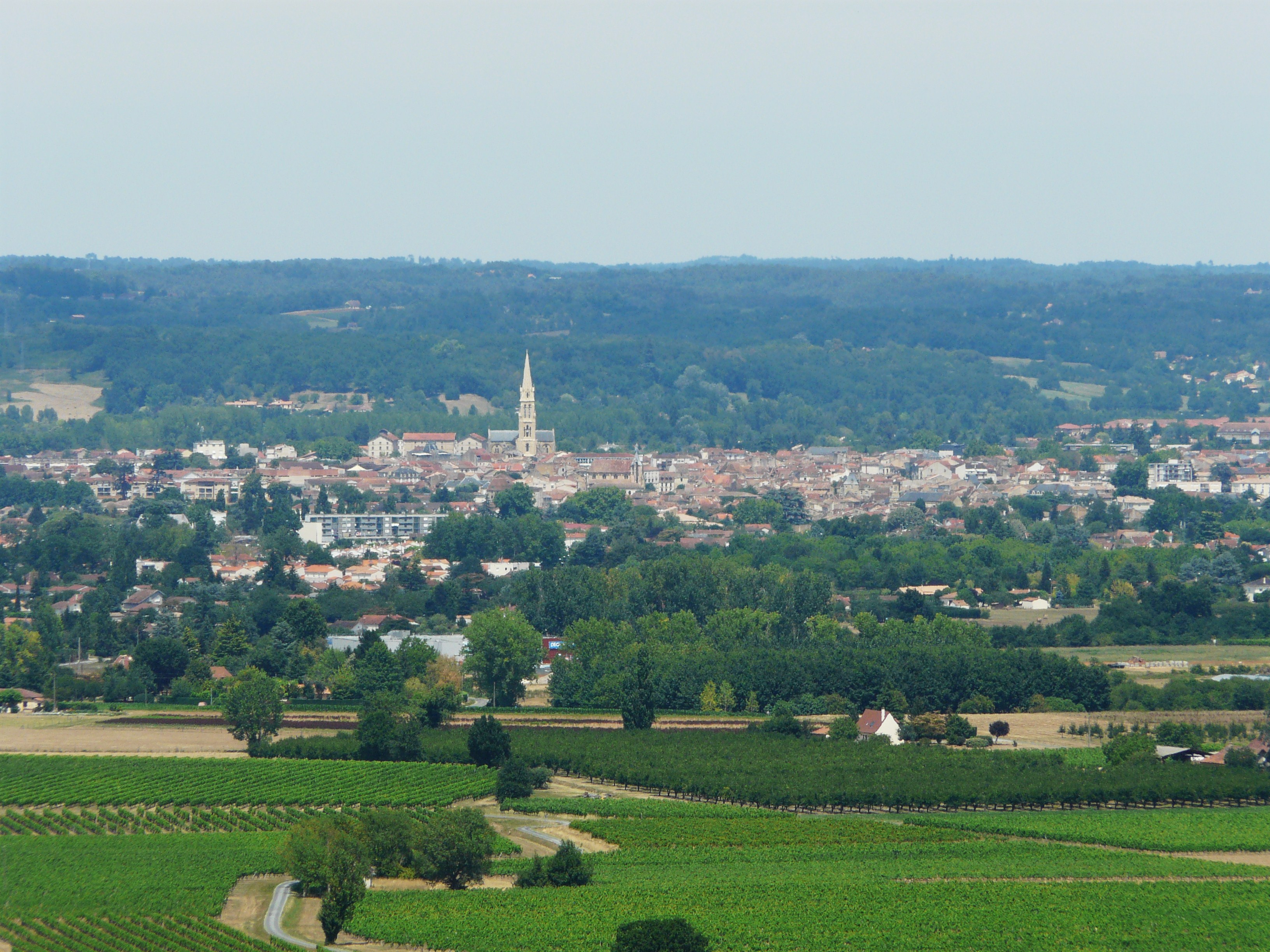
- Interactive map of Bergeracoise
- Coordinates: 44°51′N 00°28′E
- Country: France
- Region: Nouvelle-Aquitaine
- Department: Dordogne
- No. of communes: {{{nbcomm}}}
- Established: 2017
- Area: 586.6 km^{2} (226.5 sq mi)
- Population (2019): 60,585
  - Density: 103.3/km^{2} (267.5/sq mi)
- Website: www.la-cab.fr

Communauté d'agglomération Bergeracoise is the communauté d'agglomération, an intercommunal structure, centred on the town of Bergerac. It is located in the Dordogne department, in the Nouvelle-Aquitaine region, southwestern France. Created in 2017, its seat is in Bergerac. Its area is 586.6 km^{2}. Its population was 60,585 in 2019, of which 26,693 in Bergerac proper.

== Composition ==
The communauté d'agglomération consists of the following 38 communes:

1. Bergerac
2. Bosset
3. Bouniagues
4. Colombier
5. Cours-de-Pile
6. Creysse
7. Cunèges
8. Le Fleix
9. La Force
10. Fraisse
11. Gageac-et-Rouillac
12. Gardonne
13. Ginestet
14. Lamonzie-Montastruc
15. Lamonzie-Saint-Martin
16. Lembras
17. Lunas
18. Mescoules
19. Monbazillac
20. Monestier
21. Monfaucon
22. Mouleydier
23. Pomport
24. Prigonrieux
25. Queyssac
26. Razac-de-Saussignac
27. Ribagnac
28. Rouffignac-de-Sigoulès
29. Saint-Georges-Blancaneix
30. Saint-Germain-et-Mons
31. Saint-Géry
32. Saint-Laurent-des-Vignes
33. Saint-Nexans
34. Saint-Pierre-d'Eyraud
35. Saint-Sauveur
36. Saussignac
37. Sigoulès-et-Flaugeac
38. Thénac
