= Château de Gageac =

Château in Dordogne, France

Coordinates: 44°47′58″N 0°20′35″E

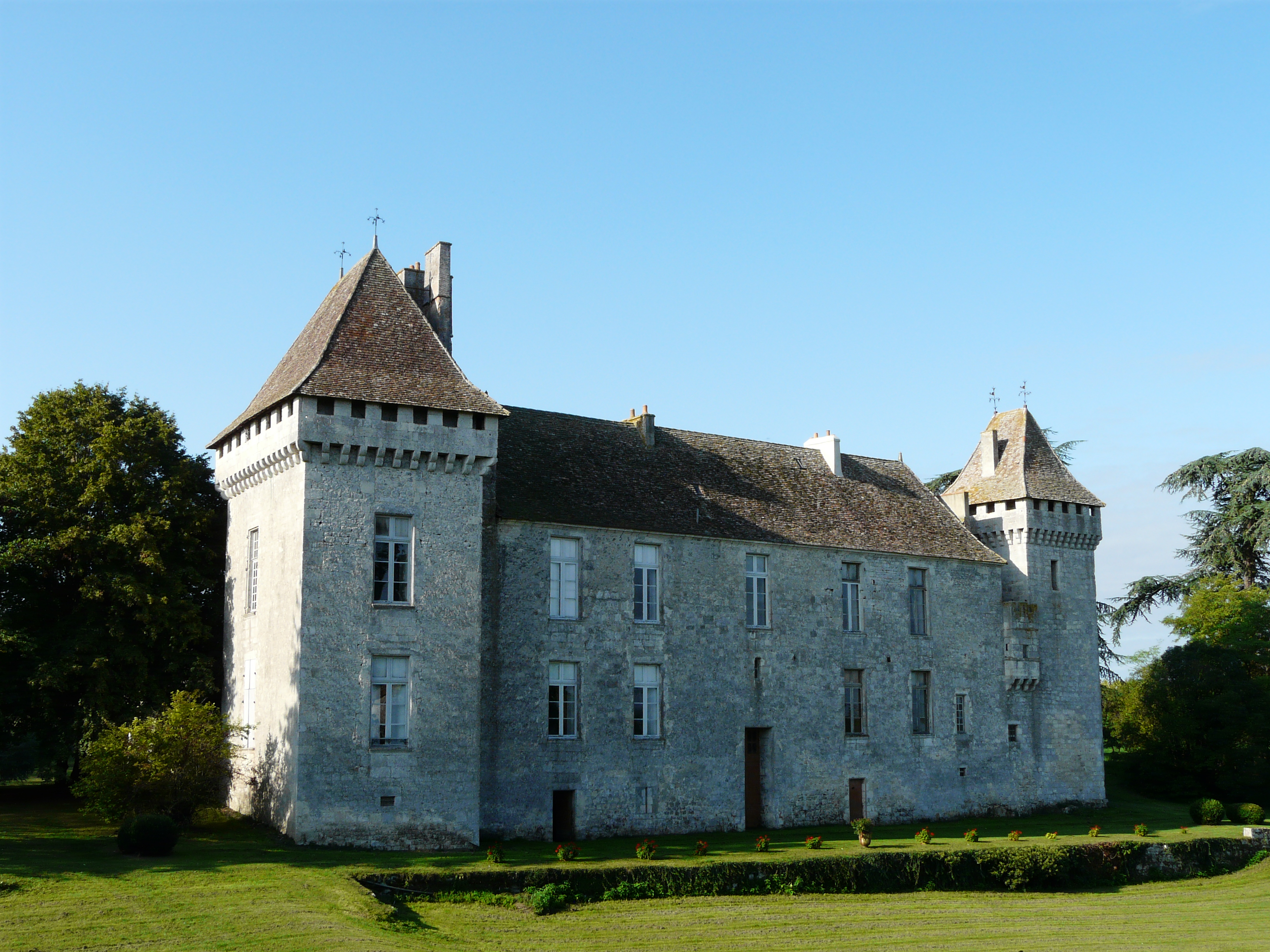

Château de Gageac is an ancient monument from the 12th/14th/18th centuries. It is a château located near Gageac-et-Rouillac in the Dordogne department in south-west France. Constructed as a fortress in the 12th century, it was besieged in 1377 during the Hundred Years' War by troops loyal to Charles V of France. Later it was converted to a residence, and it has been in the ownership of the de Vivans family for six generations. A large dovecote facing the castle is a notable feature.

== Location and early history ==
On the wine trail between Bergerac (18 km) and Sainte-Foy-la-Grande (12 km), this castle is one of the most charming of South Bergerac, overlooking the Dordogne valley and surrounded by vineyards, whose wine has an international reputation. Its architecture with simple and imposing lines makes this castle one of the most harmonious of the region. Its location was chosen to be a stronghold of the castle of Duras.

Duras is located about twenty kilometers south and it belonged to the Dukes of the same name belonging to the Durfort family. Gageac faced the Dordogne valley and Laforce another stronghold. There may have been animosity between the two Duchies. The original 12th-century fortress was only composed of a square tower - the keep (west side). The keep, which was the only stone building, was defended by wooden fortifications. The entrance is situated on the first floor which is reached by a ladder that was removed when attackers came. They sent carrier pigeons to deter Duras (there are traces of putlogs (nests) over the guard room). This keep is divided into two main parts: one is called the "guard room" located in the highest part, lighted by a window which can be seen on the north side. Its access is by a strange staircase, which was built in the thickness of the walls. The other room is barely lit (only by a basement window), with access from the first floor, and the ground level of the rock is the dungeon or oubliette. It was used as a store for food or weapons, and is entered using the ladder also used to access the tower.

During the Middle Ages, men who were guarding the tower were housed there. Duras provided weapons and maybe some horses. But Gageac had to organize its own food; this is the reason why we find in old books "the robbers of Gageac just skimming the outskirts of the Madeleine." Gageac was later expanded. Another building separate from the dungeon was built to house the troops. It was possible to move from one building to another with the help of a removable panel on the first floor.

When the English invaded the region, Gageac was burned and rebuilt, but the dungeon remained intact. Around 1350, the castle was enlarged by adding a tower whose framework was the work of a marine architect. The dry moat surrounding the current buildings was protected by wetlands. A second wall, flanked by watchtowers, stood outside the moat. It was a fortress, in modern terms a garrison house.

== Hundred Years' War ==
In August–September 1377, King Charles V decided to reclaim the region for the Kingdom of France. He sent his brother, Louis I, Duke of Anjou, who marched into the region during the summer of 1377. Initially, the expedition was easy: the small neighboring towns of Bergerac submitted, including La Force. But when he realized that the Anglo-Gascon, Perducat d'Albret, governor of Bergerac, was determined to resist, he called for help from the Constable du Guesclin. Seeking to avoid losses, the Duke and Constables were confined primarily to a few useless skirmishes. It was decided to send a soldier to La Réole in order to bring back a sow or "turtle" (a huge rolling machine that could hold a hundred men and throw huge stones), but the Anglo-Gascon Sir Thomas Felton, Seneschal of Gascony, arrived quickly from Bordeaux with a squad in order to cut their road. Du Guesclin heard of the intentions of Felton and sent a strong company to reinforce the squad. The clash took place near Eymet, and the troops of Charles V won the battle. There were many killed and wounded, and Sir Thomas Felton and Gaillard II de Durfort were taken prisoner. In August 1377, Du Guesclin used his advantage to overwhelm and lay siege to Duras and Gageac, despite the fact that Gageac had a reputation of being impregnable. Constable Guesclin excelled in the art of sieges; he was skilled in the use of projectiles and relied heavily on the terror inspired by his reputation. He stayed five days outside Gageac. The Anglo-Gascons of Gageac had not stored enough food to outlast a long siege. After the first bombing, the defenders capitulated, fearing that otherwise a massacre might result. Next Du Guesclin bombarded Bergerac, which opened the city to him, and Perducat d’Albret fled with his troops. On September 2, 1377, the local leaders swore loyalty to the Duke of Anjou. War ended, and there was no reason to have a stronghold.

== Conversion to a residence ==
Gaillard de Durfort of Duras decided to convert Gageac into a residence, which was later added to by the d'Essenault de Castelnau and then by the du Reclus. All of these embellished the château to make it more livable. During the seventeenth and early eighteenth centuries, Gageac was profoundly transformed and beautified. The main building was extended upwards by attics, 3 doubles and 2 singles from north to south. There is still one in the front, a floor was removed and large windows were opened.

On the way to the pigeon loft, there is a small well-shaped square, one of the oldest in the village. Legend says that the Virgin used to appear, and processions took place there each year with the gilded image of the Virgin located right in the chapel of the church.

The impressive pigeon loft of 7 meters in diameter and about 10 meters high was built facing the castle and was the mark of Lordship. The pigeon loft had several functions: to provide meat and to produce fertilizer for the vineyard. The ground level was designed for poultry. The dovecote was situated on the first floor. Nest boxes were accessible with a ladder but we do not know the number because the interior has been modified over the years. The regulation of the number of nests was strict and could not be more than 5 acres (20,000 m^{2}) per nest. The pigeon loft bears a stone above the front door, but we do not know its meaning. The frame, cover and upper frieze were completely restored in 2009.

du Reclus’ family, who had visited the court of Versailles for the favor of the King, had a very expensive life, so Gageac was forgotten. In the 19th century the buildings were in very bad condition; the Doussaut de la Primaudiere helped by their son-in-law renovated the castle with modern techniques. The main staircase was doubled in the West Dungeon. They opened a mullion window to create an extra room. The interior layout has been redefined by brickwork walls and plasterwork. Old fireplaces were removed and replaced with modern ones. The north terrace was made using remains of old fortifications, and a monumental gate was created. The spring was channeled to flow into ponds: the large pond is about 1.20 m deep. During the 19th century an avenue was created for the arrival of carriages through the woods, and an avenue of cedar of Lebanon was planted (partially destroyed in two recent storms).

The mulberry bushes along the road were for rearing Bombyx (silkworm), and were a great success in the 1870s. Bombyx feed on the leaves of the mulberry, whose growth is very rapid. The cocoons were boiled and sent to Lyon, then a silk manufacturing centre, to be unwound, forming embroidery thread of high quality.

Gageac still belongs to the family de la Verrie de Vivans originating from Siorac-en-Périgord, descendants of the famous Captain Geoffrey de Vivans. The family have owned the property for six generations.
