= Saint-Géry, Dordogne =

Saint-Géry
- Commune
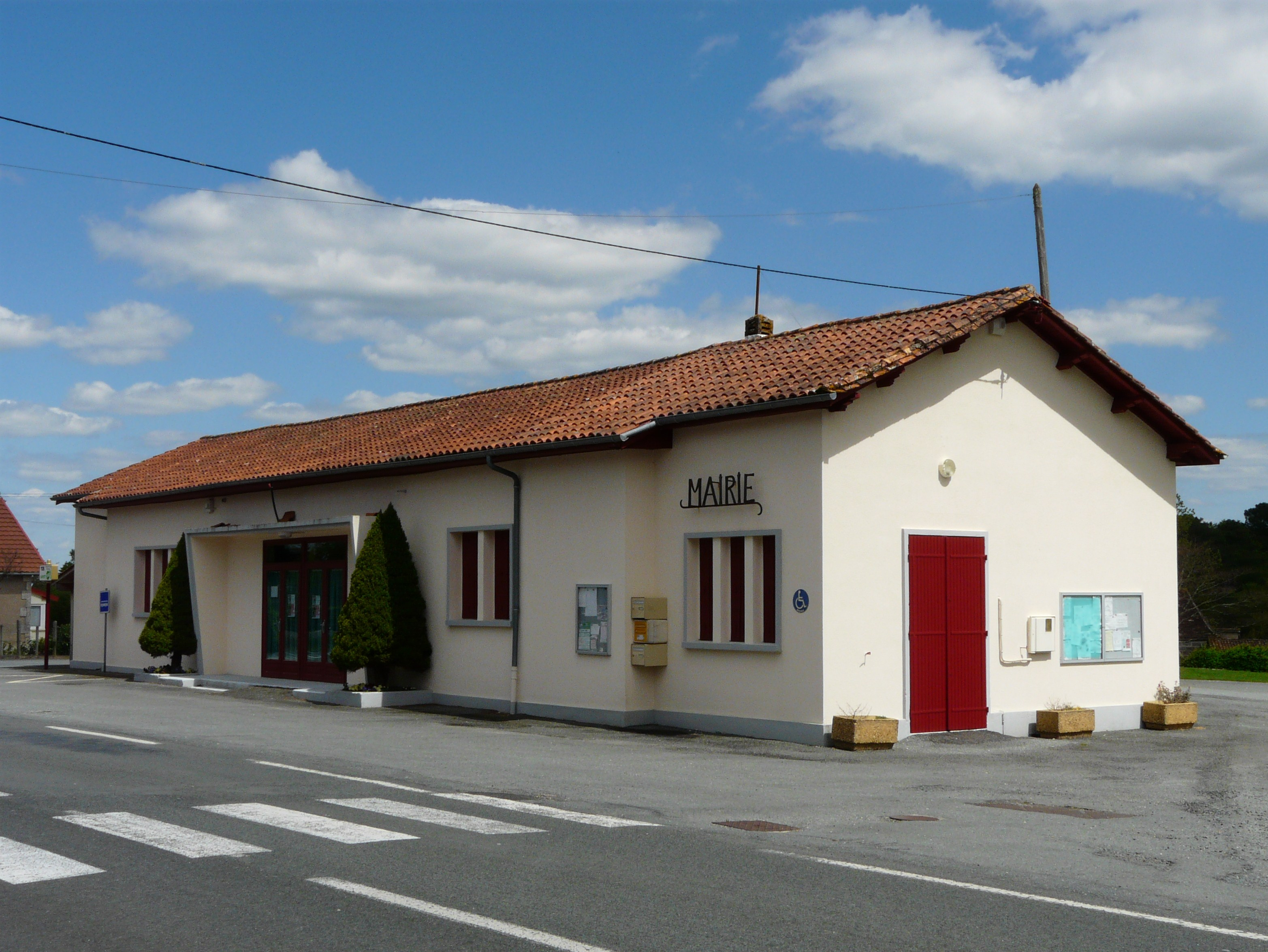
- The town hall in Saint-Géry
- Location of Saint-Géry
- Location within France Location within Nouvelle-Aquitaine
- Coordinates: 44°59′06″N 0°19′28″E
- Country: France
- Region: Nouvelle-Aquitaine
- Department: Dordogne
- Arrondissement: Bergerac
- Canton: Pays de la Force
- Intercommunality: CA Bergeracoise

Government
  - Mayor (2020–2026): Sébastien Bourdin
- Area^{1}: 18.71 km^{2} (7.22 sq mi)
- Highest elevation: 148 m (486 ft)
- Lowest elevation: 60 m (200 ft)
- Population (2023): 239
  - Density: 12.8/km^{2} (33.1/sq mi)
- Time zone: UTC+01:00 (CET)
  - Summer (DST): UTC+02:00 (CEST)
- INSEE/Postal code: 24420 /24400
- ^{1} French Land Register data, which excludes lakes, ponds, glaciers > 1 km^{2} (0.386 sq mi or 247 acres) and river estuaries.

Saint-Géry (French pronunciation: [sɛ̃ ʒeʁi]; Limousin: Sent Geri) is a commune in the Dordogne department in Nouvelle-Aquitaine in southwestern France.

== Population ==
Historical population
Year	Pop.	±% p.a.
1968	258	—
1975	233	−1.45%
1982	203	−1.95%
1990	207	+0.24%
1999	193	−0.78%
2007	206	+0.82%
2012	223	+1.60%
2017	236	+1.14%
2023	239	+0.21%
Source: INSEE

== See also ==
- Communes of the Dordogne department
