= Bosset =

- Commune
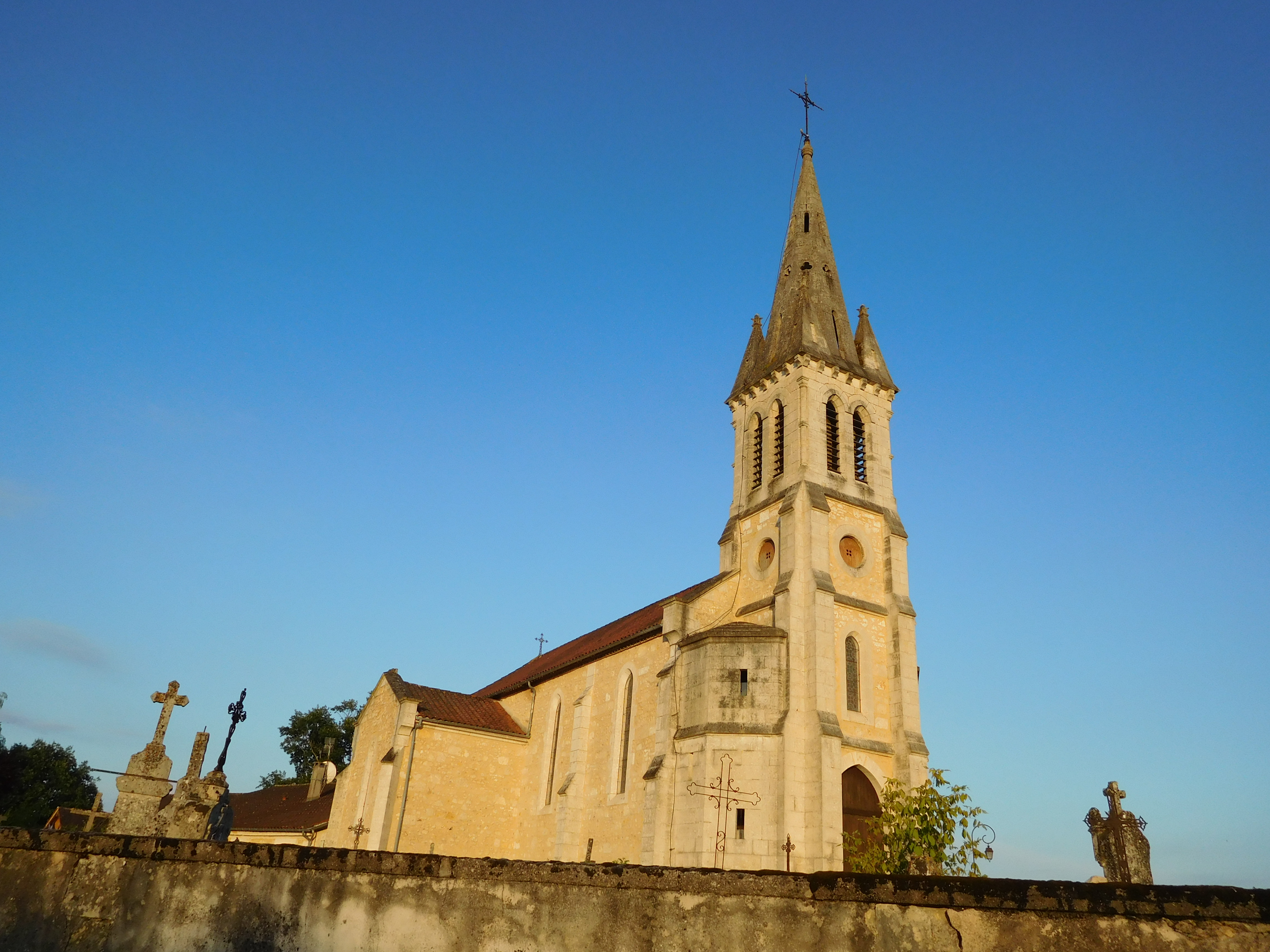
- The church in Bosset

- Coat of arms
- Location of Bosset
- Location within France Location within Nouvelle-Aquitaine
- Coordinates: 44°57′09″N 0°21′14″E
- Country: France
- Region: Nouvelle-Aquitaine
- Department: Dordogne
- Arrondissement: Bergerac
- Canton: Pays de la Force
- Intercommunality: CA Bergeracoise

Government
  - Mayor (2020–2026): Didier Gouze
- Area^{1}: 14.52 km^{2} (5.61 sq mi)
- Elevation: 130 m (430 ft)
- Highest elevation: 146 m (479 ft)
- Lowest elevation: 69 m (226 ft)
- Population (2023): 234
  - Density: 16.1/km^{2} (41.7/sq mi)
- Time zone: UTC+01:00 (CET)
  - Summer (DST): UTC+02:00 (CEST)
- INSEE/Postal code: 24051 /24130
- ^{1} French Land Register data, which excludes lakes, ponds, glaciers > 1 km^{2} (0.386 sq mi or 247 acres) and river estuaries.

Bosset (French pronunciation: [bɔsɛ]; Occitan: Bòsc Sec) is a commune in the Dordogne department in southwestern France.

== Population ==
Historical population
Year	Pop.	±% p.a.
1968	204	—
1975	199	−0.35%
1982	182	−1.27%
1990	209	+1.74%
1999	206	−0.16%
2007	201	−0.31%
2012	198	−0.30%
2017	215	+1.66%
2023	234	+1.42%
Source: INSEE

== See also ==
- Communes of the Dordogne département
