= Lunas, Dordogne =

Lunas
- Commune
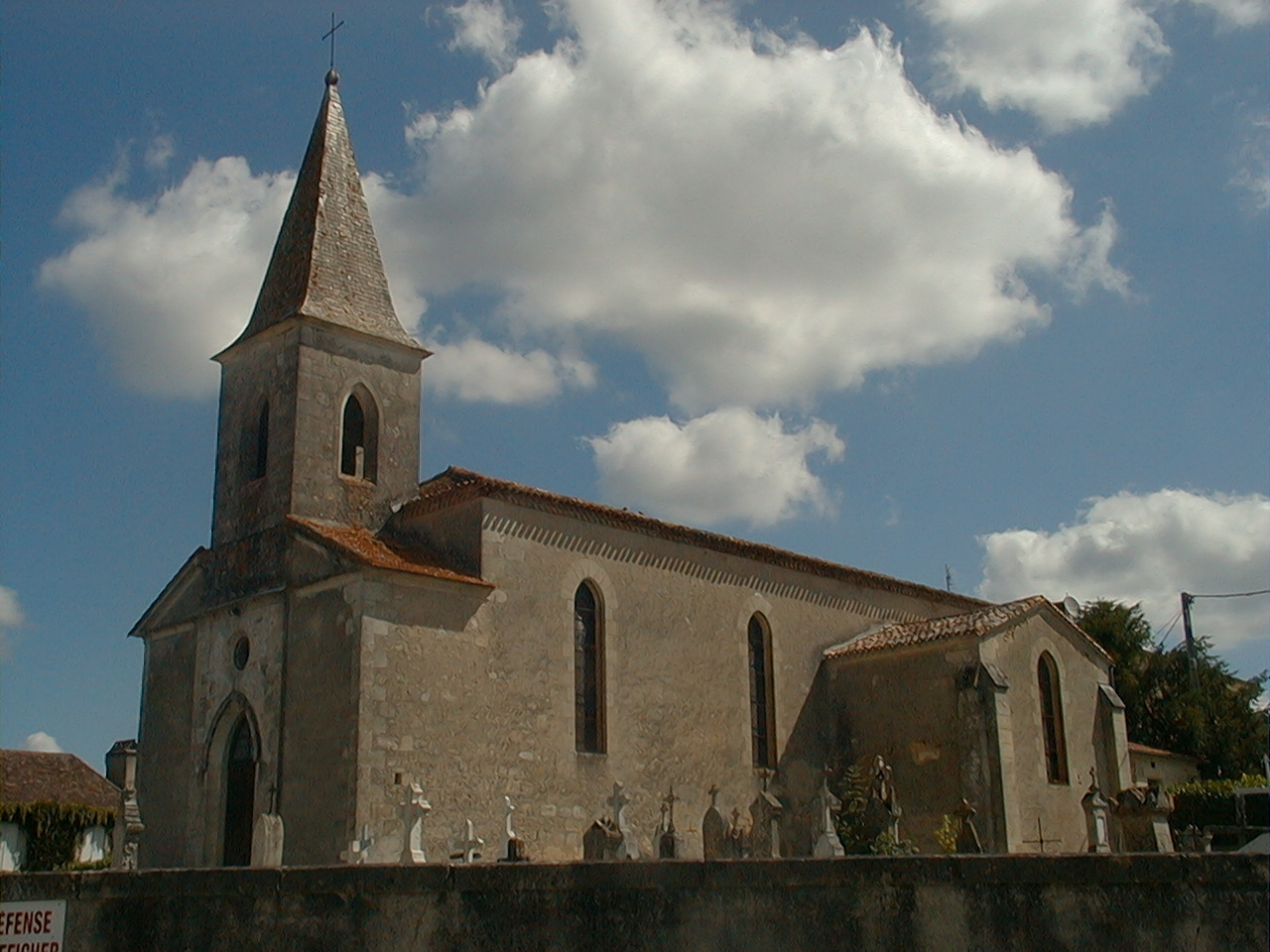
- The church in Lunas
- Location of Lunas
- Location within France Location within Nouvelle-Aquitaine
- Coordinates: 44°55′04″N 0°24′14″E
- Country: France
- Region: Nouvelle-Aquitaine
- Department: Dordogne
- Arrondissement: Bergerac
- Canton: Pays de la Force
- Intercommunality: CA Bergeracoise

Government
  - Mayor (2020–2026): Pascal Liabaste
- Area^{1}: 16.87 km^{2} (6.51 sq mi)
- Elevation: 47 m (154 ft)
- Highest elevation: 128 m (420 ft)
- Lowest elevation: 37 m (121 ft)
- Population (2023): 459
  - Density: 27.2/km^{2} (70.5/sq mi)
- Time zone: UTC+01:00 (CET)
  - Summer (DST): UTC+02:00 (CEST)
- INSEE/Postal code: 24246 /24130
- ^{1} French Land Register data, which excludes lakes, ponds, glaciers > 1 km^{2} (0.386 sq mi or 247 acres) and river estuaries.

Lunas is a commune in the Dordogne department in Nouvelle-Aquitaine in southwestern France.

== Population ==
Historical population
Year	Pop.	±% p.a.
1968	229	—
1975	225	−0.25%
1982	252	+1.63%
1990	297	+2.08%
1999	294	−0.11%
2007	338	+1.76%
2012	352	+0.82%
2017	386	+1.86%
2023	459	+2.93%
Source: INSEE

== See also ==
- Communes of the Dordogne department
