= Lamonzie-Saint-Martin =

- Commune
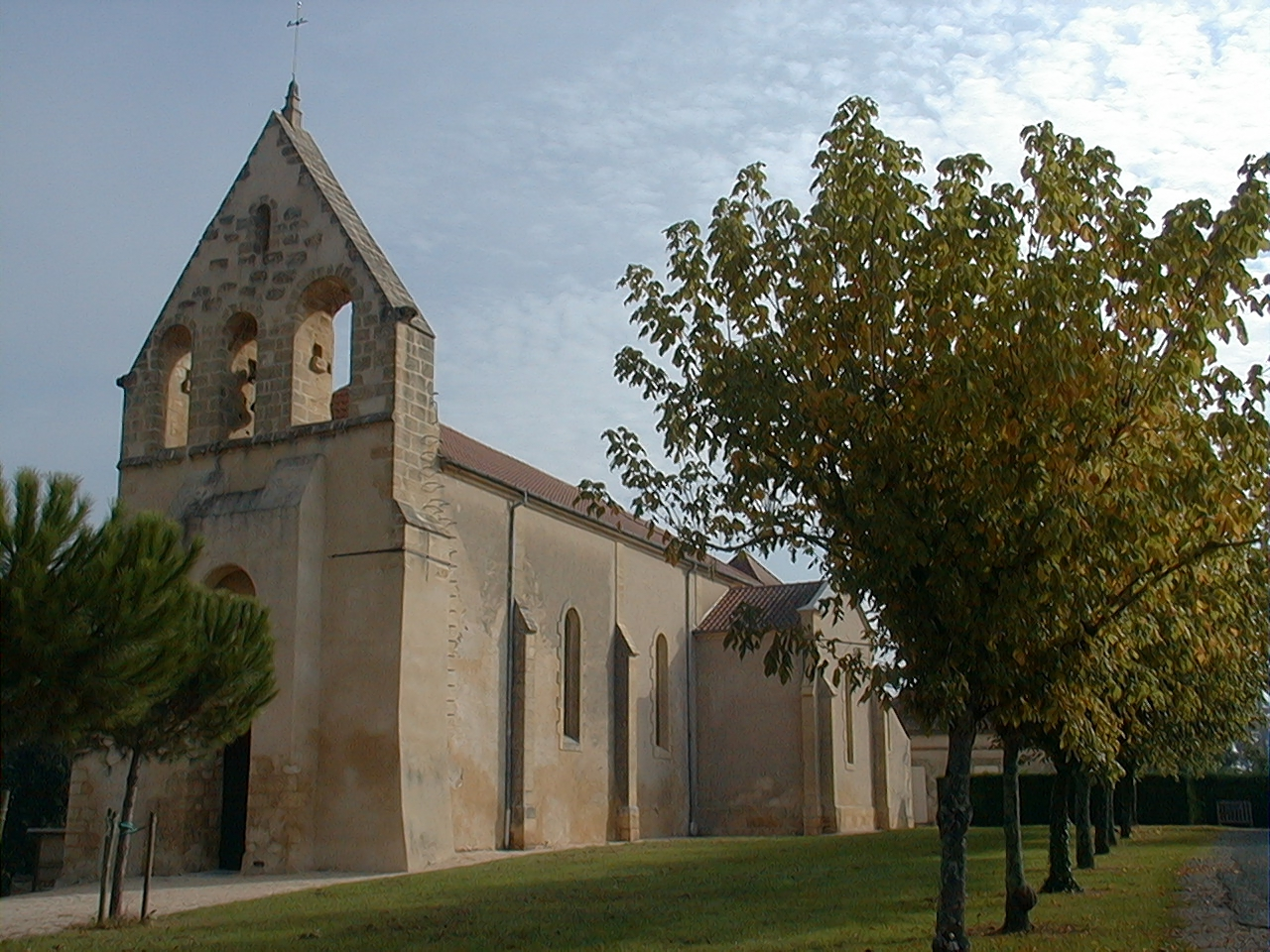
- The church in Lamonzie-Saint-Martin

- Coat of arms
- Location of Lamonzie-Saint-Martin
- Location within France Location within Nouvelle-Aquitaine
- Coordinates: 44°50′36″N 0°23′05″E
- Country: France
- Region: Nouvelle-Aquitaine
- Department: Dordogne
- Arrondissement: Bergerac
- Canton: Pays de la Force
- Intercommunality: CA Bergeracoise

Government
  - Mayor (2020–2026): Thierry Auroy-Peytou
- Area^{1}: 20.64 km^{2} (7.97 sq mi)
- Elevation: 27 m (89 ft)
- Highest elevation: 59 m (194 ft)
- Lowest elevation: 12 m (39 ft)
- Population (2023): 2,742
  - Density: 132.8/km^{2} (344.1/sq mi)
- Time zone: UTC+01:00 (CET)
  - Summer (DST): UTC+02:00 (CEST)
- INSEE/Postal code: 24225 /24680
- ^{1} French Land Register data, which excludes lakes, ponds, glaciers > 1 km^{2} (0.386 sq mi or 247 acres) and river estuaries.

Lamonzie-Saint-Martin is a commune in the Dordogne department in Nouvelle-Aquitaine in southwestern France. Lamonzie-Saint-Martin station has rail connections to Bordeaux, Bergerac and Sarlat-la-Canéda.

== Population ==
Historical population
Year	Pop.	±% p.a.
1968	1,235	—
1975	1,446	+2.28%
1982	1,612	+1.56%
1990	2,010	+2.80%
1999	2,069	+0.32%
2007	2,221	+0.89%
2012	2,426	+1.78%
2017	2,532	+0.86%
2023	2,742	+1.34%
Source: INSEE

== See also ==
- Communes of the Dordogne department
