= Mescoules =

- Commune
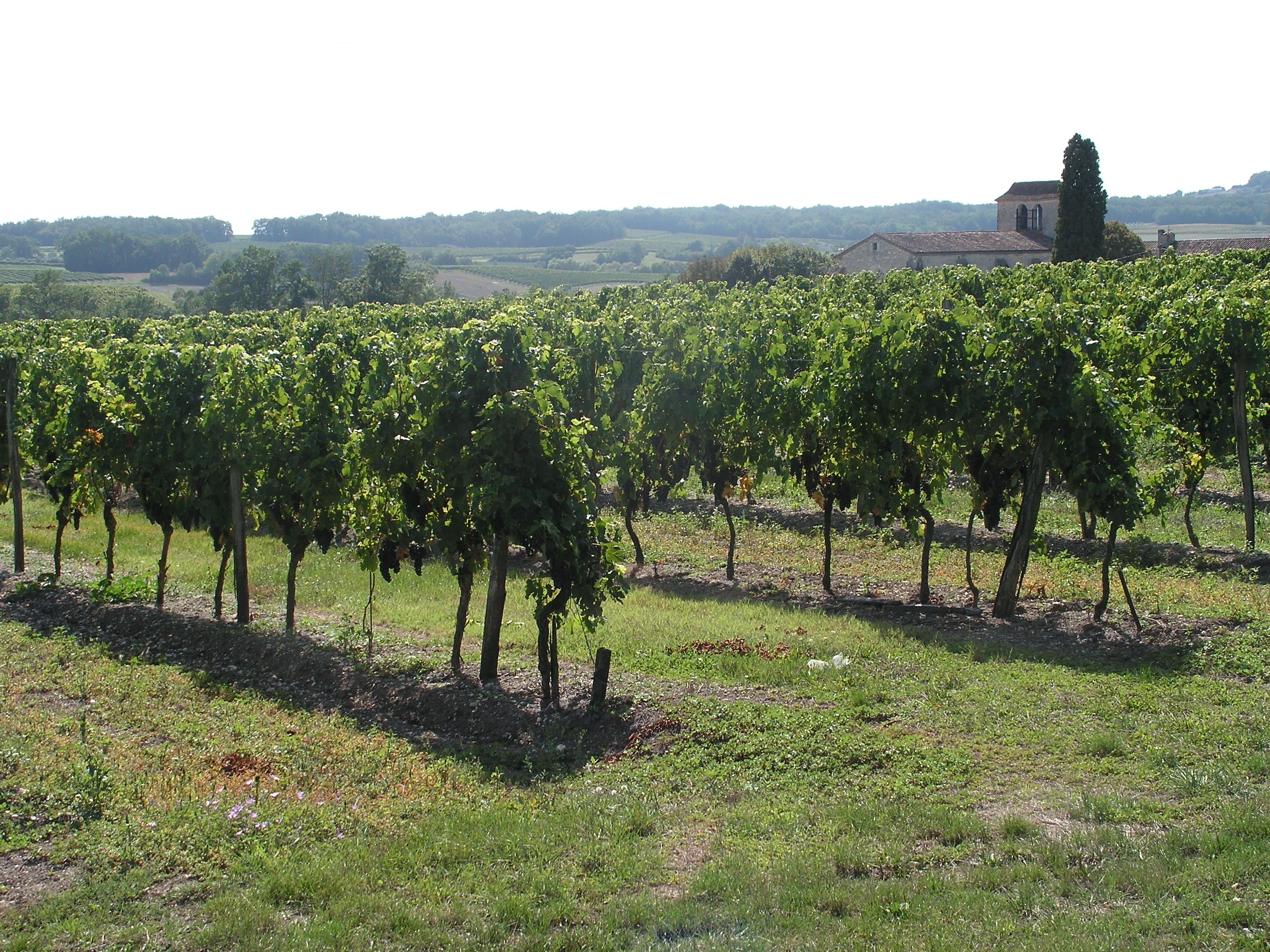
- Vineyard and the church of Mescoules
- Location of Mescoules
- Location within France Location within Nouvelle-Aquitaine
- Coordinates: 44°44′44″N 0°25′56″E
- Country: France
- Region: Nouvelle-Aquitaine
- Department: Dordogne
- Arrondissement: Bergerac
- Canton: Sud-Bergeracois
- Intercommunality: CA Bergeracoise

Government
  - Mayor (2020–2026): Emmanuel Guichard
- Area^{1}: 4.85 km^{2} (1.87 sq mi)
- Elevation: 120 m (390 ft)
- Highest elevation: 166 m (545 ft)
- Lowest elevation: 83 m (272 ft)
- Population (2023): 177
  - Density: 36.5/km^{2} (94.5/sq mi)
- Time zone: UTC+01:00 (CET)
  - Summer (DST): UTC+02:00 (CEST)
- INSEE/Postal code: 24267 /24240
- ^{1} French Land Register data, which excludes lakes, ponds, glaciers > 1 km^{2} (0.386 sq mi or 247 acres) and river estuaries.

Mescoules (French pronunciation: [mɛskul]; Occitan: Mescola) is a commune in the Dordogne department in Nouvelle-Aquitaine in southwestern France.

== Population ==
Historical population
Year	Pop.	±% p.a.
1968	155	—
1975	150	−0.47%
1982	135	−1.49%
1990	144	+0.81%
1999	141	−0.23%
2007	157	+1.35%
2012	169	+1.48%
2017	176	+0.82%
2023	177	+0.09%
Source: INSEE

== See also ==
- Communes of the Dordogne department
