= Ribagnac =

- Commune
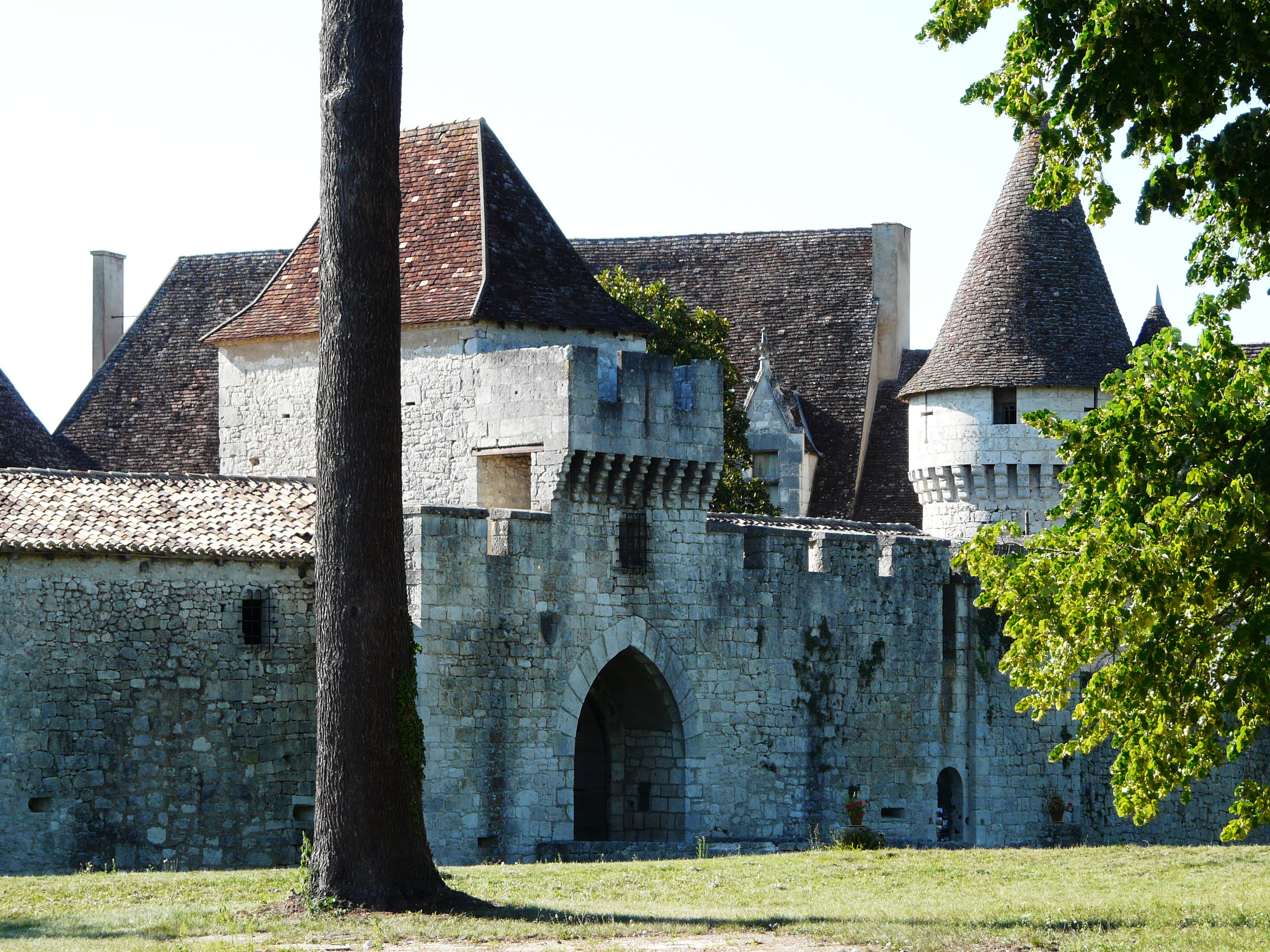
- Chateau of Bridoire

- Coat of arms
- Location of Ribagnac
- Location within France Location within Nouvelle-Aquitaine
- Coordinates: 44°46′00″N 0°29′57″E
- Country: France
- Region: Nouvelle-Aquitaine
- Department: Dordogne
- Arrondissement: Bergerac
- Canton: Sud-Bergeracois
- Intercommunality: CA Bergeracoise

Government
  - Mayor (2020–2026): Cédric Lougrat
- Area^{1}: 11.81 km^{2} (4.56 sq mi)
- Elevation: 153 m (502 ft)
- Highest elevation: 183 m (600 ft)
- Lowest elevation: 78 m (256 ft)
- Population (2023): 344
  - Density: 29.1/km^{2} (75.4/sq mi)
- Time zone: UTC+01:00 (CET)
  - Summer (DST): UTC+02:00 (CEST)
- INSEE/Postal code: 24351 /24240
- ^{1} French Land Register data, which excludes lakes, ponds, glaciers > 1 km^{2} (0.386 sq mi or 247 acres) and river estuaries.

Ribagnac (French pronunciation: [ʁibaɲak]; Occitan: Ribanhac) is a commune in the Dordogne department in Nouvelle-Aquitaine in southwestern France.

== Population ==
Historical population
Year	Pop.	±% p.a.
1968	225	—
1975	193	−2.17%
1982	224	+2.15%
1990	278	+2.74%
1999	291	+0.51%
2007	307	+0.67%
2012	321	+0.90%
2017	308	−0.82%
2023	344	+1.86%
Source: INSEE

== See also ==
- Communes of the Dordogne department
