= Saint-Georges-Blancaneix =

- Commune
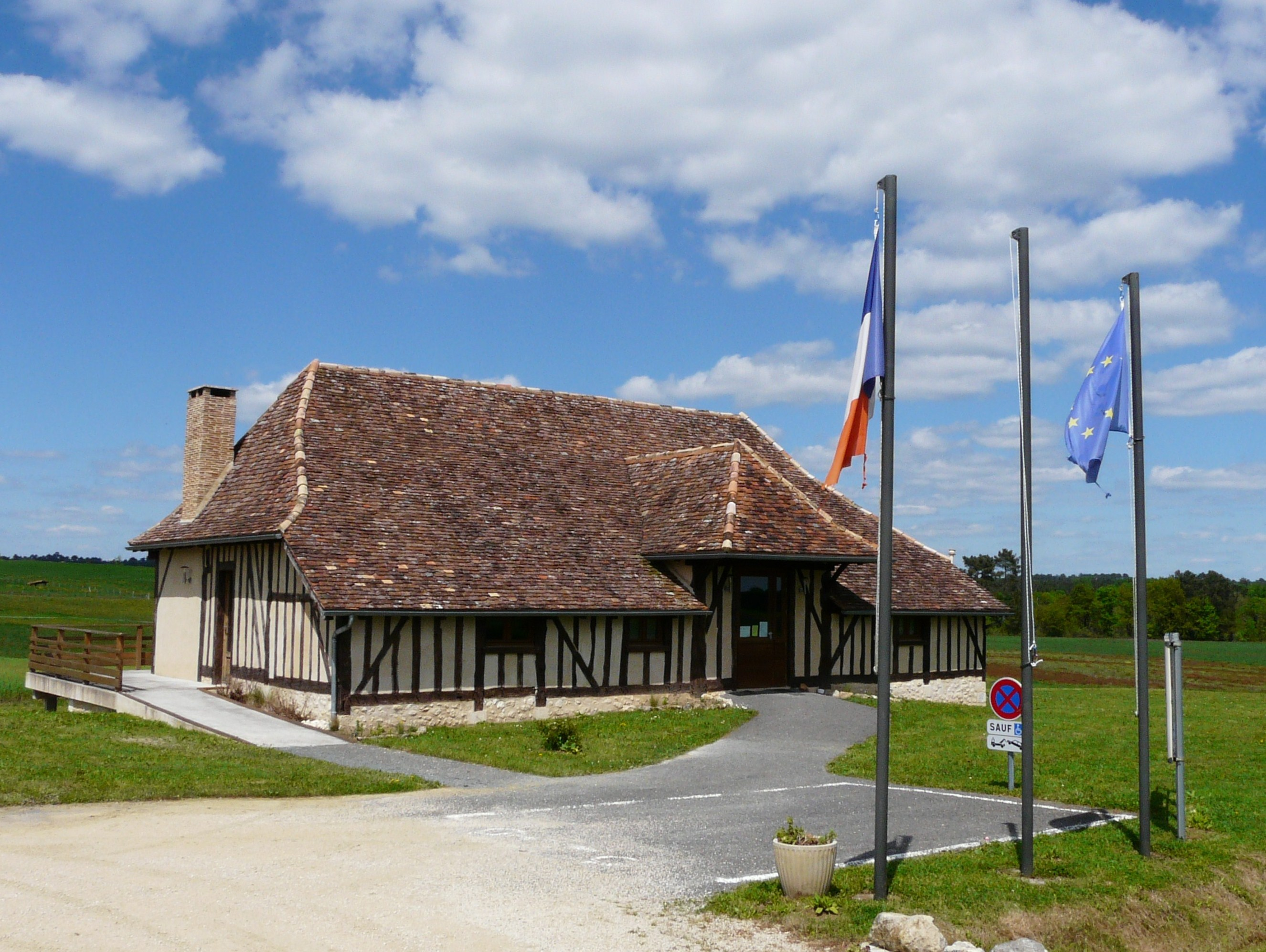
- The town hall in Saint-Georges-Blancaneix
- Location of Saint-Georges-Blancaneix
- Location within France Location within Nouvelle-Aquitaine
- Coordinates: 44°55′18″N 0°21′00″E
- Country: France
- Region: Nouvelle-Aquitaine
- Department: Dordogne
- Arrondissement: Bergerac
- Canton: Pays de la Force
- Intercommunality: CA Bergeracoise

Government
  - Mayor (2020–2026): Francis Blondin
- Area^{1}: 13.62 km^{2} (5.26 sq mi)
- Elevation: 65 m (213 ft)
- Highest elevation: 138 m (453 ft)
- Lowest elevation: 35 m (115 ft)
- Population (2023): 275
  - Density: 20.2/km^{2} (52.3/sq mi)
- Time zone: UTC+01:00 (CET)
  - Summer (DST): UTC+02:00 (CEST)
- INSEE/Postal code: 24413 /24130
- ^{1} French Land Register data, which excludes lakes, ponds, glaciers > 1 km^{2} (0.386 sq mi or 247 acres) and river estuaries.

Saint-Georges-Blancaneix (Occitan: Sent Jòrge de Blancanés) is a commune in the Dordogne department in Nouvelle-Aquitaine in southwestern France. The population was 281 as of 2021.

== Population ==
Historical population
Year	Pop.	±% p.a.
1968	123	—
1975	124	+0.12%
1982	143	+2.06%
1990	180	+2.92%
1999	165	−0.96%
2007	217	+3.48%
2012	232	+1.35%
2017	252	+1.67%
2023	275	+1.47%
Source: INSEE

== See also ==
- Communes of the Dordogne department
