= Monfaucon, Dordogne =

Monfaucon
- Commune
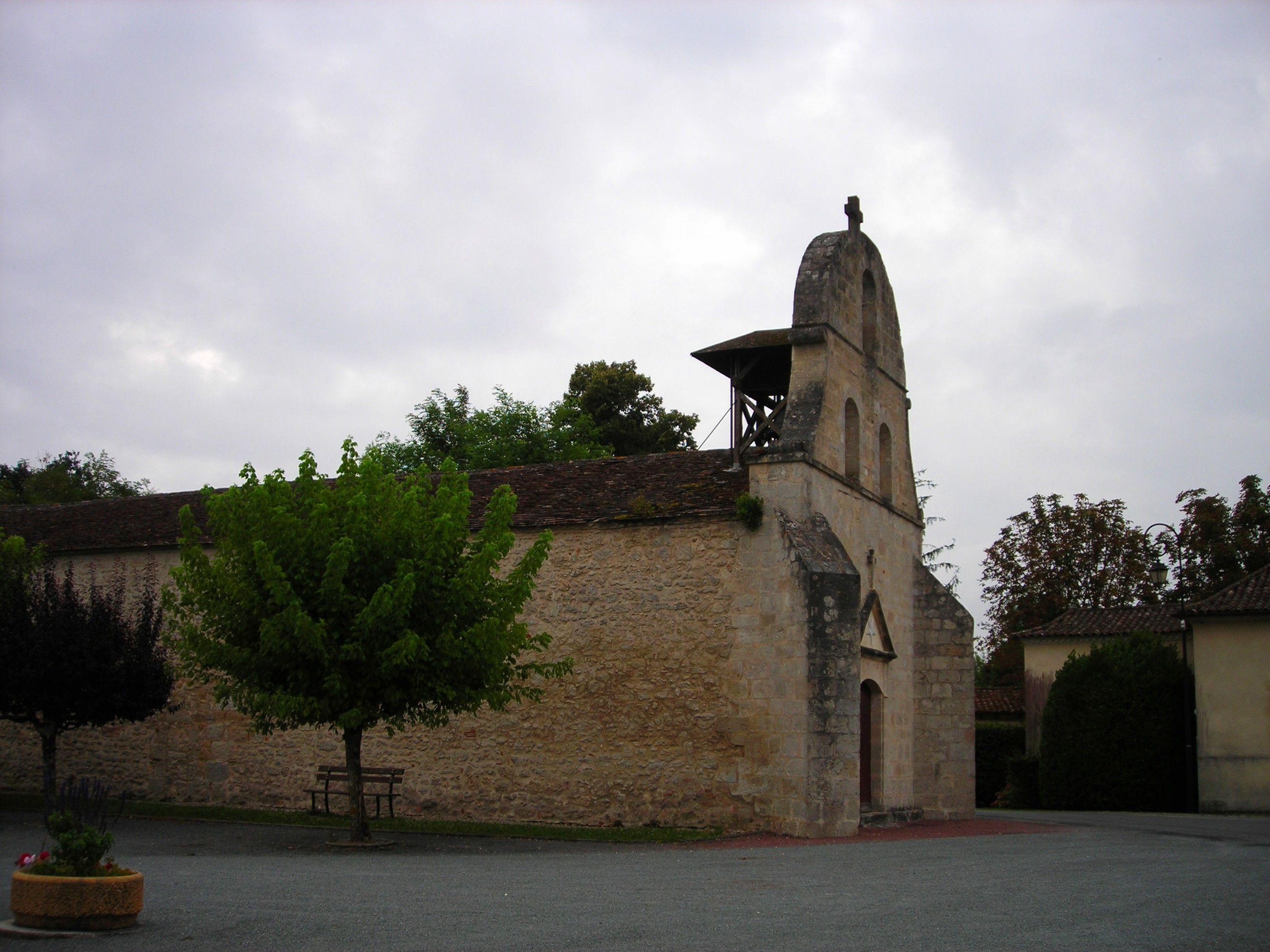
- The church in Monfaucon
- Location of Monfaucon
- Location within France Location within Nouvelle-Aquitaine
- Coordinates: 44°54′45″N 0°14′18″E
- Country: France
- Region: Nouvelle-Aquitaine
- Department: Dordogne
- Arrondissement: Bergerac
- Canton: Pays de la Force
- Intercommunality: CA Bergeracoise

Government
  - Mayor (2020–2026): Arnaud Delair
- Area^{1}: 24.74 km^{2} (9.55 sq mi)
- Elevation: 102 m (335 ft)
- Highest elevation: 125 m (410 ft)
- Lowest elevation: 31 m (102 ft)
- Population (2023): 285
  - Density: 11.5/km^{2} (29.8/sq mi)
- Time zone: UTC+01:00 (CET)
  - Summer (DST): UTC+02:00 (CEST)
- INSEE/Postal code: 24277 /24130
- ^{1} French Land Register data, which excludes lakes, ponds, glaciers > 1 km^{2} (0.386 sq mi or 247 acres) and river estuaries.

Monfaucon (French pronunciation: [mɔ̃fokɔ̃]; Occitan: Montfaucon) is a commune in Dordogne department in Nouvelle-Aquitaine in southwestern France.

== Population ==
Historical population
| Year | Pop. | ±% p.a. |
|---|---|---|
| 1968 | 250 | — |
| 1975 | 186 | −4.14% |
| 1982 | 209 | +1.68% |
| 1990 | 233 | +1.37% |
| 1999 | 232 | −0.05% |
| 2007 | 262 | +1.53% |
| 2012 | 287 | +1.84% |
| 2017 | 294 | +0.48% |
| 2023 | 285 | −0.52% |
Source: INSEE

== See also ==
- Communes of the Dordogne department
