= Prigonrieux =

- Commune
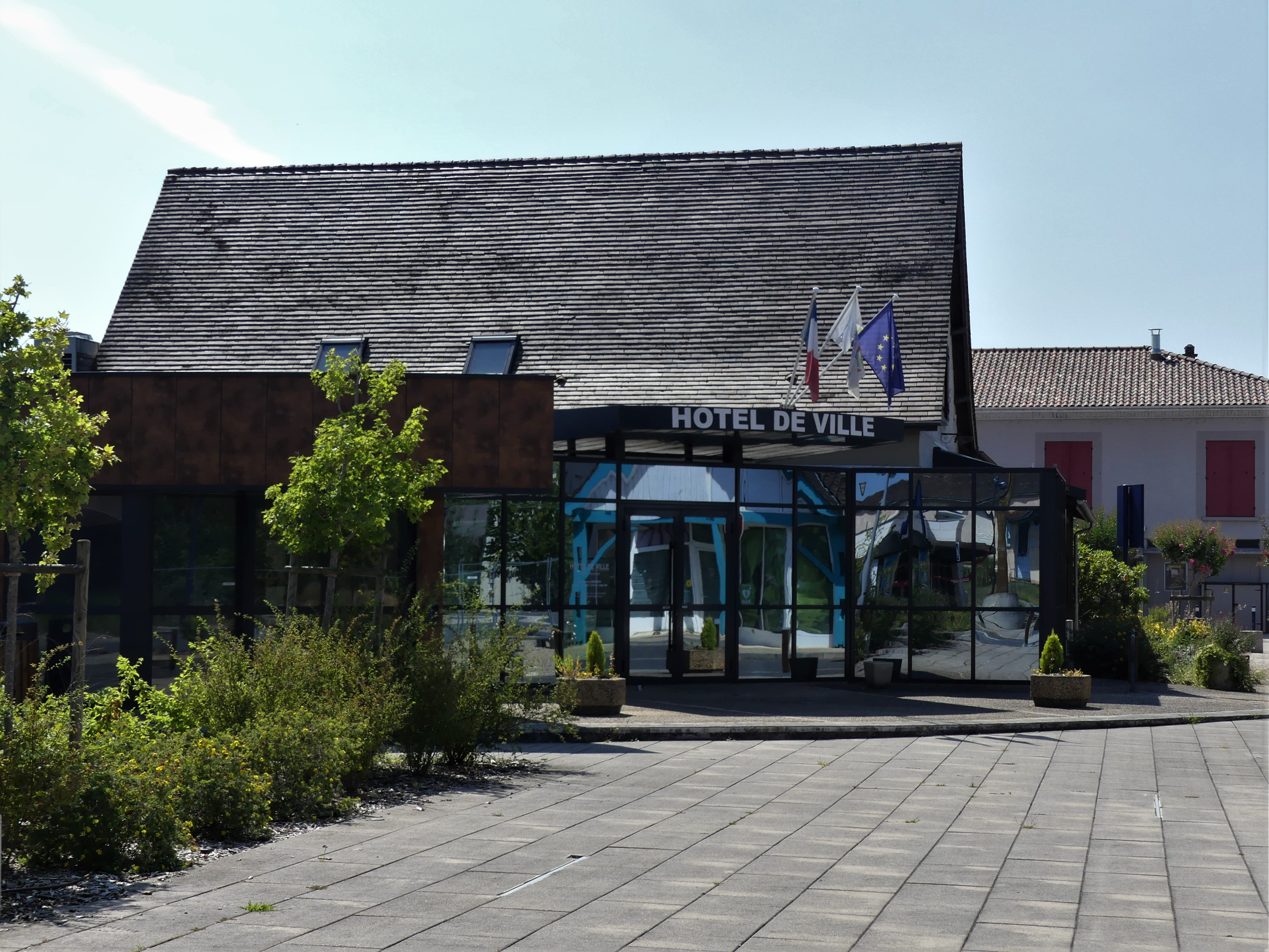
- The town hall in Prigonrieux

- Coat of arms
- Location of Prigonrieux
- Location within France Location within Nouvelle-Aquitaine
- Coordinates: 44°51′18″N 0°24′15″E
- Country: France
- Region: Nouvelle-Aquitaine
- Department: Dordogne
- Arrondissement: Bergerac
- Canton: Pays de la Force
- Intercommunality: CA Bergeracoise

Government
  - Mayor (2020–2026): Olivier Dupuy
- Area^{1}: 26.12 km^{2} (10.08 sq mi)
- Elevation: 28 m (92 ft)
- Highest elevation: 118 m (387 ft)
- Lowest elevation: 12 m (39 ft)
- Population (2023): 4,374
  - Density: 167.5/km^{2} (433.7/sq mi)
- Time zone: UTC+01:00 (CET)
  - Summer (DST): UTC+02:00 (CEST)
- INSEE/Postal code: 24340 /24130
- ^{1} French Land Register data, which excludes lakes, ponds, glaciers > 1 km^{2} (0.386 sq mi or 247 acres) and river estuaries.

Prigonrieux (French pronunciation: [pʁiɡɔ̃ʁjø]; Occitan: Prigond Riu) is a commune in the Dordogne department in Nouvelle-Aquitaine in southwestern France.

== Population ==
Historical population
Year	Pop.	±% p.a.
1968	1,728	—
1975	2,461	+5.18%
1982	3,093	+3.32%
1990	3,721	+2.34%
1999	3,956	+0.68%
2007	3,895	−0.19%
2012	4,172	+1.38%
2017	4,157	−0.07%
2023	4,374	+0.85%
Source: INSEE

== See also ==
- Communes of the Dordogne department
