= Gardonne station =

Railway station in Gardonne, France

Coordinates: 44°50′05″N 0°19′56″E

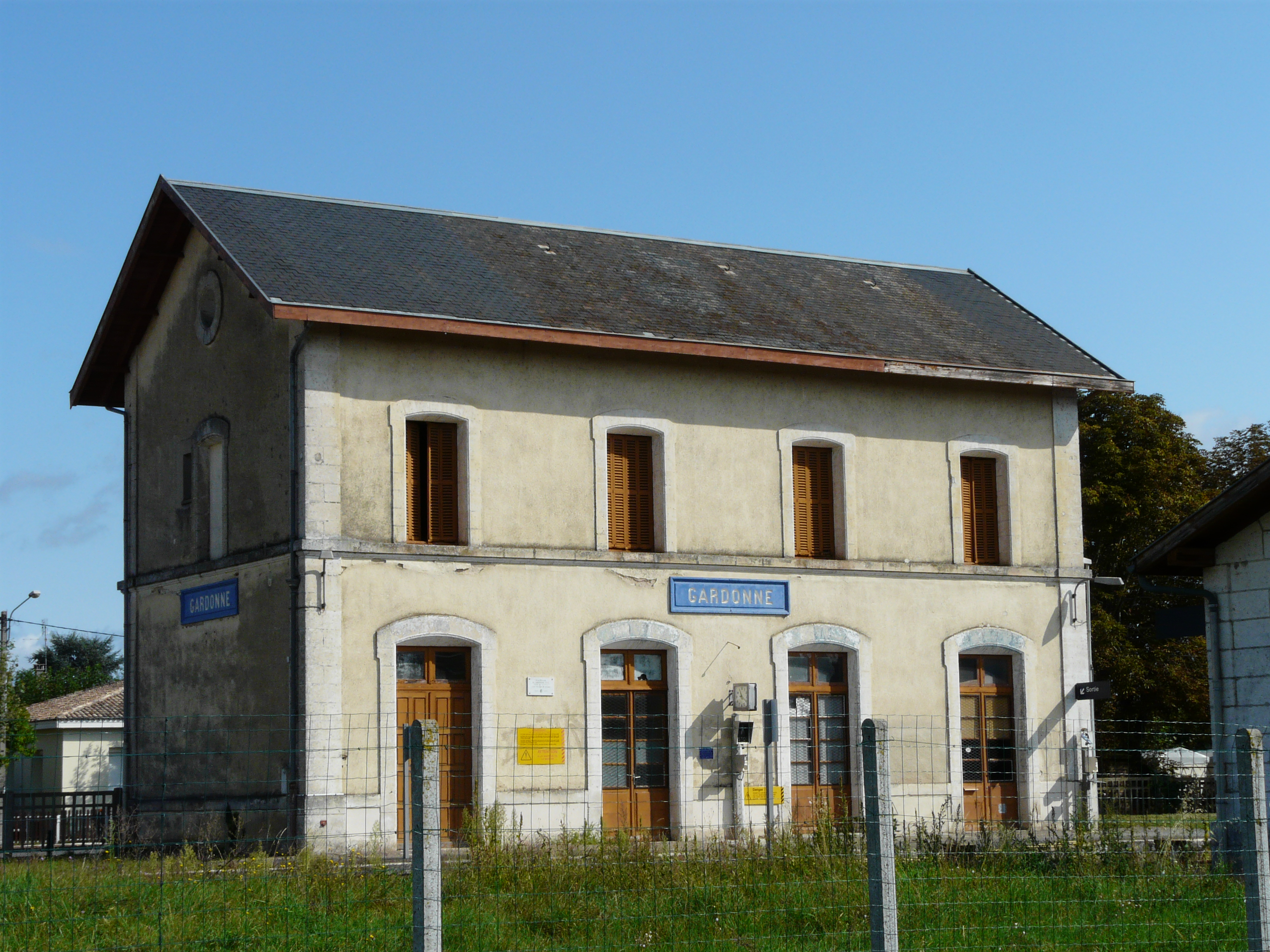
Gardonne station

Gardonne is a railway station in Gardonne, Nouvelle-Aquitaine, France. The station is located on the Libourne - Le Buisson railway line. The station is served by TER (local) services operated by SNCF.

== Train services ==
The following services currently call at Gardonne:

- local service (TER Nouvelle-Aquitaine) Bordeaux - Libourne - Bergerac - Sarlat-la-Canéda

Preceding station	TER Nouvelle-Aquitaine	Following station
Sainte-Foy-la-Grande towards Bordeaux	33	Lamonzie-Saint-Martin towards Sarlat-la-Canéda
