= Monestier, Dordogne =

Monestier
- Commune
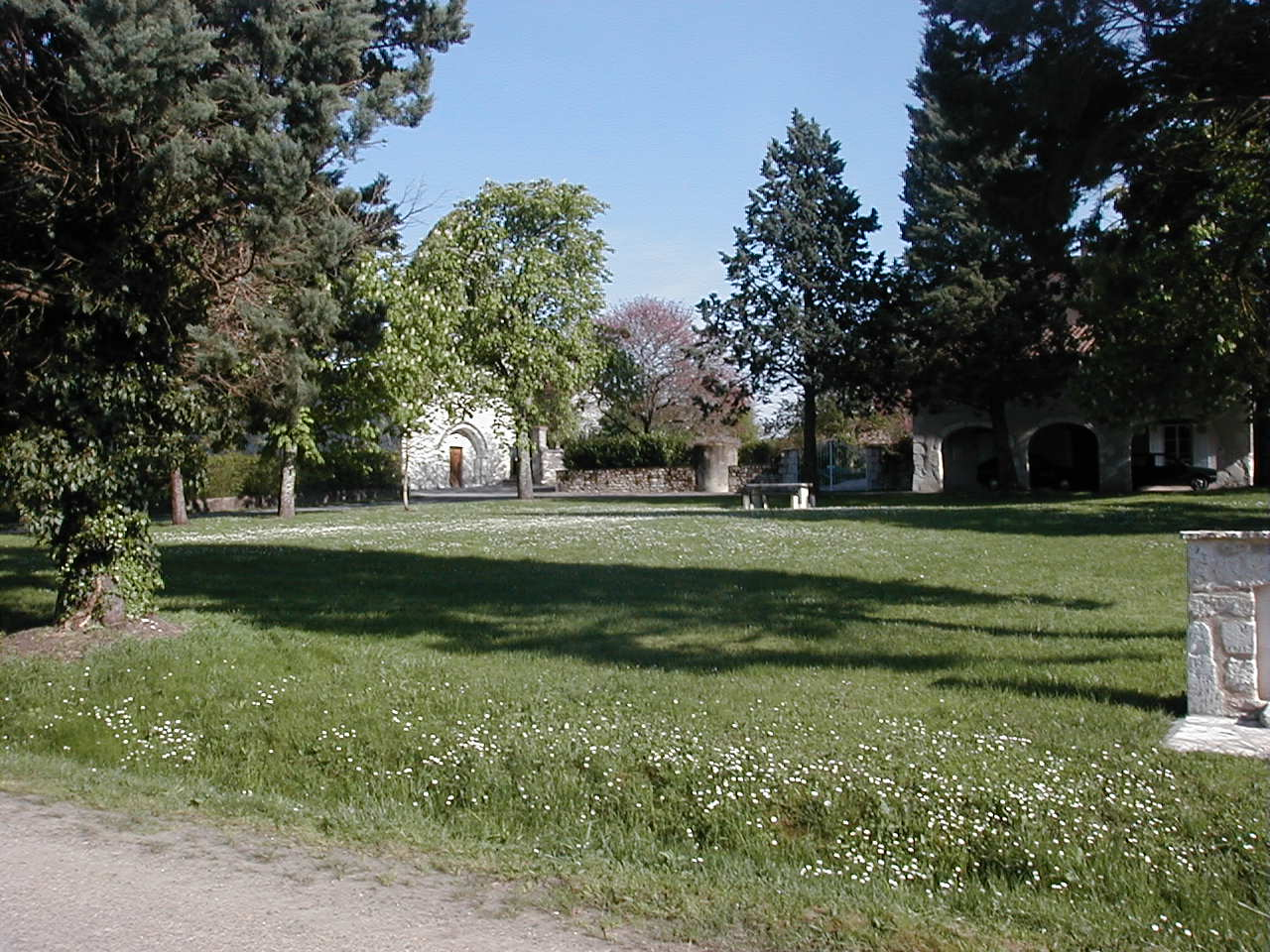
- A view within Monestier

- Coat of arms
- Location of Monestier
- Location within France Location within Nouvelle-Aquitaine
- Coordinates: 44°46′27″N 0°19′44″E
- Country: France
- Region: Nouvelle-Aquitaine
- Department: Dordogne
- Arrondissement: Bergerac
- Canton: Sud-Bergeracois
- Intercommunality: CA Bergeracoise

Government
  - Mayor (2020–2026): Marie-Agnès Brouilleaud
- Area^{1}: 17.75 km^{2} (6.85 sq mi)
- Elevation: 90 m (300 ft)
- Highest elevation: 155 m (509 ft)
- Lowest elevation: 41 m (135 ft)
- Population (2023): 385
  - Density: 21.7/km^{2} (56.2/sq mi)
- Time zone: UTC+01:00 (CET)
  - Summer (DST): UTC+02:00 (CEST)
- INSEE/Postal code: 24276 /24240
- ^{1} French Land Register data, which excludes lakes, ponds, glaciers > 1 km^{2} (0.386 sq mi or 247 acres) and river estuaries.

Monestier (French pronunciation: [mɔnɛstje]; Occitan: Monestièr) is a commune in the Dordogne department in Nouvelle-Aquitaine in southwestern France.

== Population ==
Historical population
Year	Pop.	±% p.a.
1968	444	—
1975	355	−3.15%
1982	346	−0.37%
1990	325	−0.78%
1999	332	+0.24%
2007	365	+1.19%
2012	379	+0.76%
2017	390	+0.57%
2023	385	−0.21%
Source: INSEE

== See also ==
- Communes of the Dordogne department
