= Cunèges =

- Commune
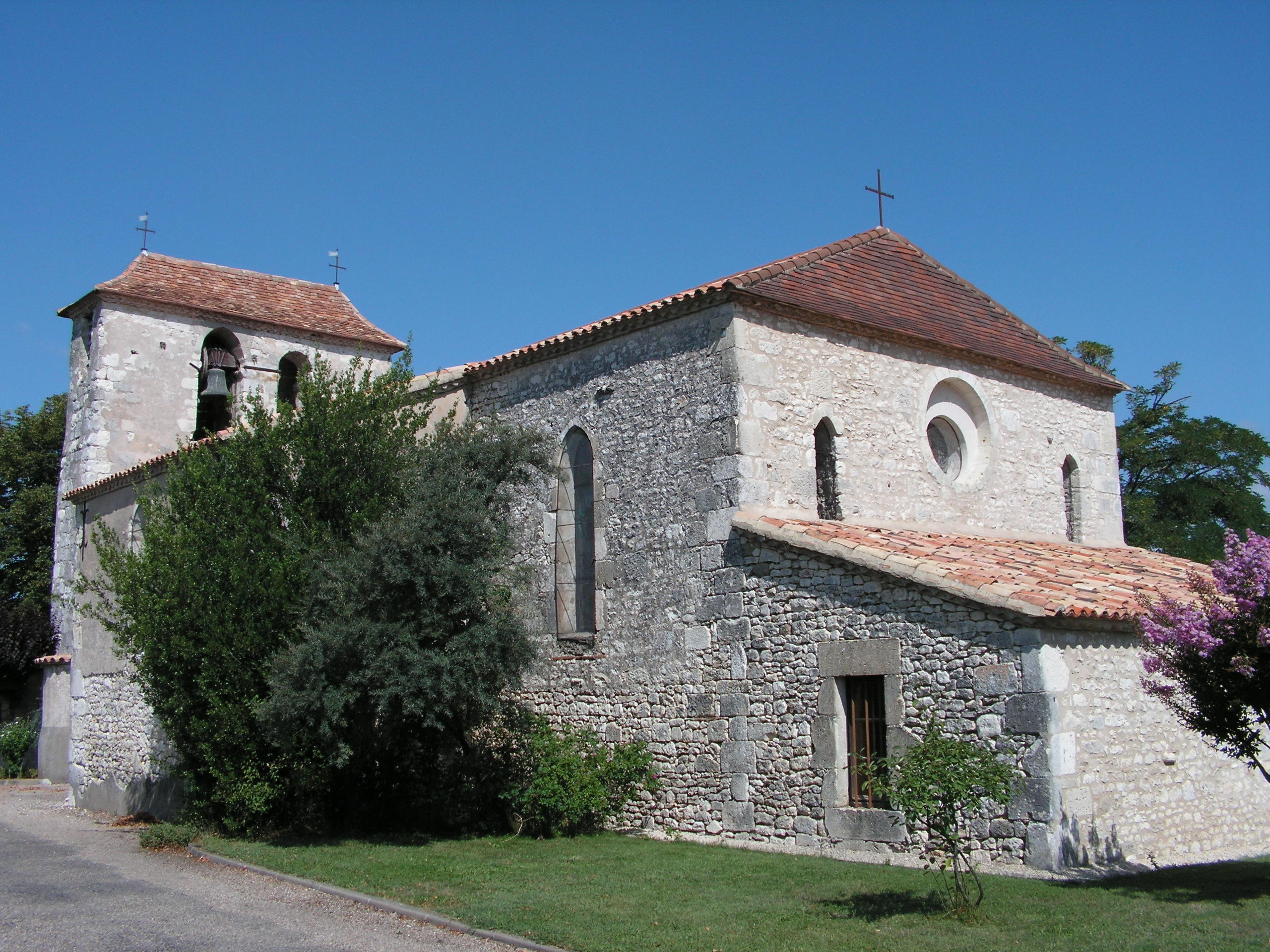
- The church in Cunèges
- Location of Cunèges
- Location within France Location within Nouvelle-Aquitaine
- Coordinates: 44°46′51″N 0°22′24″E
- Country: France
- Region: Nouvelle-Aquitaine
- Department: Dordogne
- Arrondissement: Bergerac
- Canton: Sud-Bergeracois
- Intercommunality: CA Bergeracoise

Government
  - Mayor (2020–2026): Sylvie Rivière
- Area^{1}: 5.98 km^{2} (2.31 sq mi)
- Elevation: 87 m (285 ft)
- Highest elevation: 128 m (420 ft)
- Lowest elevation: 36 m (118 ft)
- Population (2023): 314
  - Density: 52.5/km^{2} (136/sq mi)
- Time zone: UTC+01:00 (CET)
  - Summer (DST): UTC+02:00 (CEST)
- INSEE/Postal code: 24148 /24240
- ^{1} French Land Register data, which excludes lakes, ponds, glaciers > 1 km^{2} (0.386 sq mi or 247 acres) and river estuaries.

Cunèges (French pronunciation: [kynɛʒ]; Occitan: Cunèja) is a commune in the Dordogne department in Nouvelle-Aquitaine in southwestern France.

== Population ==
Historical population
Year	Pop.	±% p.a.
1968	214	—
1975	194	−1.39%
1982	206	+0.86%
1990	201	−0.31%
1999	255	+2.68%
2007	309	+2.43%
2012	299	−0.66%
2017	290	−0.61%
2023	314	+1.33%
Source: INSEE

== See also ==
- Communes of the Dordogne department
