= Saussignac =

- Commune
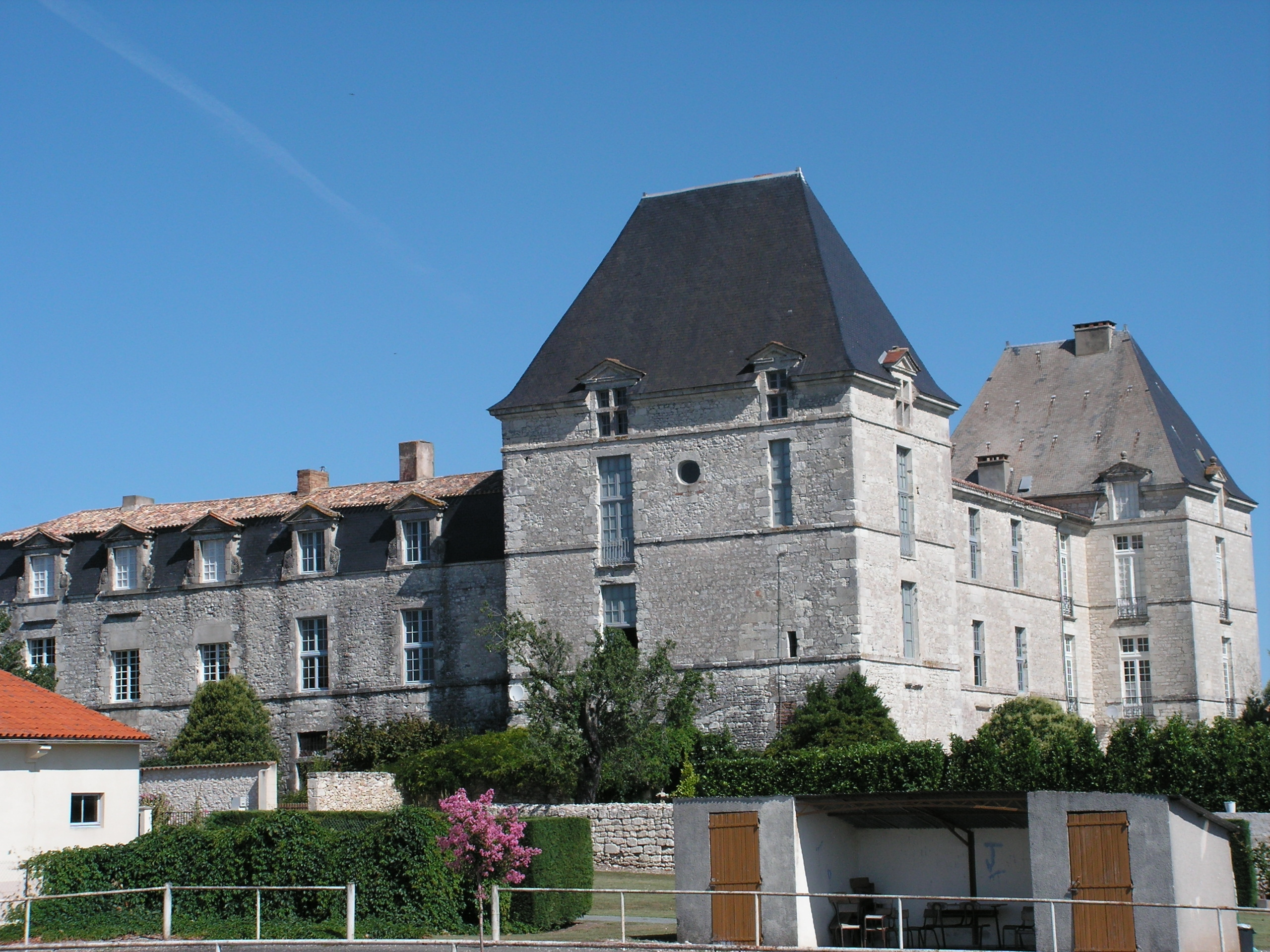
- Chateau

- Coat of arms
- Location of Saussignac
- Location within France Location within Nouvelle-Aquitaine
- Coordinates: 44°48′02″N 0°19′33″E
- Country: France
- Region: Nouvelle-Aquitaine
- Department: Dordogne
- Arrondissement: Bergerac
- Canton: Sud-Bergeracois
- Intercommunality: CA Bergeracoise

Government
  - Mayor (2024–2026): Philippe Gregoire
- Area^{1}: 20.34 km^{2} (7.85 sq mi)
- Highest elevation: 151 m (495 ft)
- Lowest elevation: 30 m (98 ft)
- Population (2023): 407
  - Density: 20.0/km^{2} (51.8/sq mi)
- Time zone: UTC+01:00 (CET)
  - Summer (DST): UTC+02:00 (CEST)
- INSEE/Postal code: 24523 /24240
- ^{1} French Land Register data, which excludes lakes, ponds, glaciers > 1 km^{2} (0.386 sq mi or 247 acres) and river estuaries.

Saussignac (French pronunciation: [sosiɲak]; Occitan: Saussinhac) is a commune in the Dordogne department in Nouvelle-Aquitaine in southwestern France. It is in the heart of Bergerac wine country and produces sweet white wines. Its village centre has a Poste and Mairie. The village is surrounded by several smaller communes each of which produce their own wines.

== Population ==
Historical population
Year	Pop.	±% p.a.
1968	476	—
1975	432	−1.38%
1982	399	−1.13%
1990	378	−0.67%
1999	411	+0.93%
2007	409	−0.06%
2012	427	+0.87%
2017	428	+0.05%
2023	407	−0.83%
Source: INSEE

== See also ==
- Saussignac AOC
- Communes of the Dordogne département
