= Pomport =

- Commune
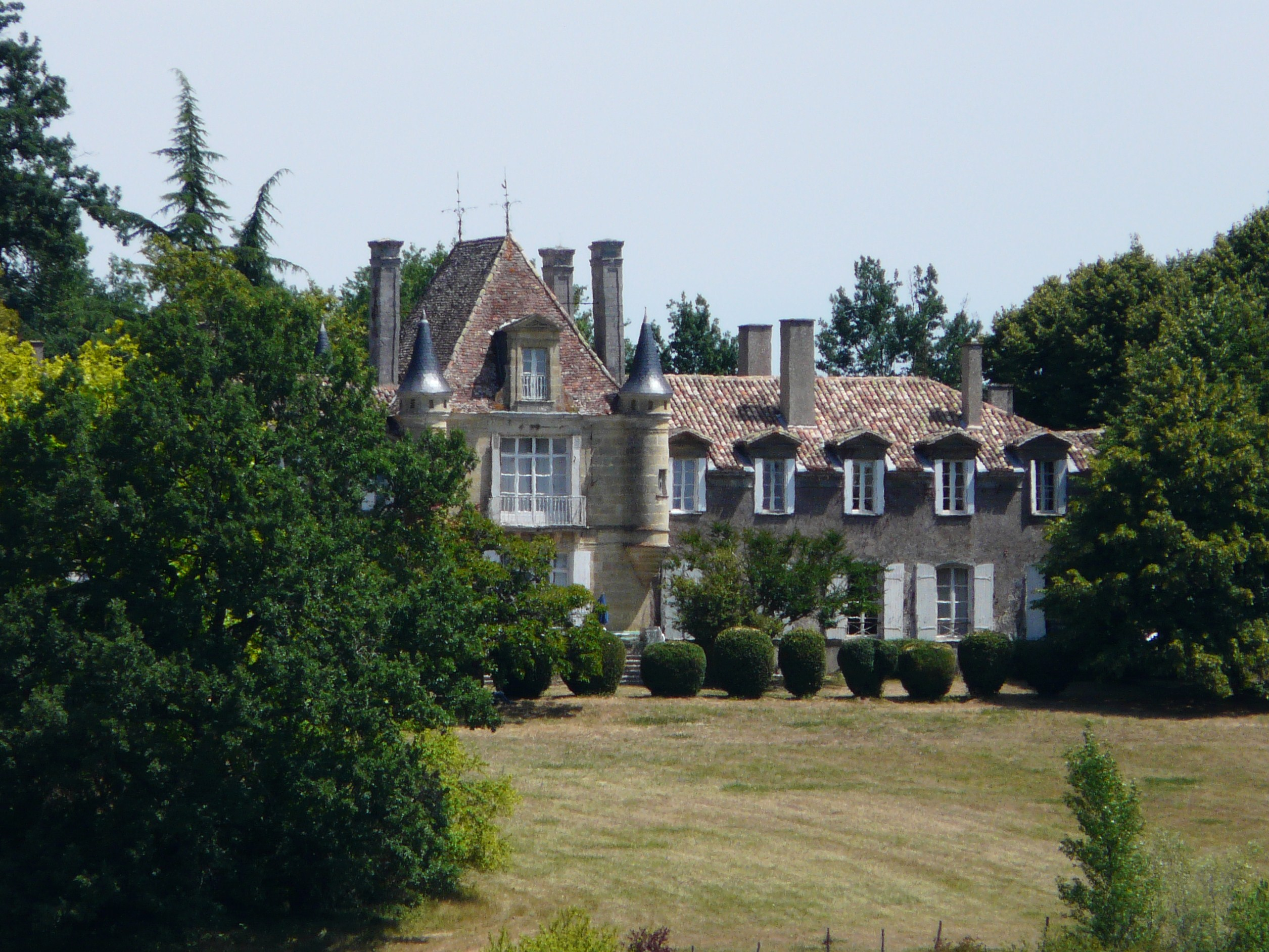
- Chateau of Pécany

- Coat of arms
- Location of Pomport
- Location within France Location within Nouvelle-Aquitaine
- Coordinates: 44°46′49″N 0°25′07″E
- Country: France
- Region: Nouvelle-Aquitaine
- Department: Dordogne
- Arrondissement: Bergerac
- Canton: Sud-Bergeracois
- Intercommunality: CA Bergeracoise

Government
  - Mayor (2020–2026): Anthony Castaing
- Area^{1}: 19.55 km^{2} (7.55 sq mi)
- Elevation: 155 m (509 ft)
- Highest elevation: 171 m (561 ft)
- Lowest elevation: 38 m (125 ft)
- Population (2023): 735
  - Density: 37.6/km^{2} (97.4/sq mi)
- Time zone: UTC+01:00 (CET)
  - Summer (DST): UTC+02:00 (CEST)
- INSEE/Postal code: 24331 /24240
- ^{1} French Land Register data, which excludes lakes, ponds, glaciers > 1 km^{2} (0.386 sq mi or 247 acres) and river estuaries.

Pomport (French pronunciation: [pɔ̃pɔʁ]; Occitan: Pompòrt) is a commune in the Dordogne department in Nouvelle-Aquitaine in southwestern France.

== Population ==
Historical population
Year	Pop.	±% p.a.
1968	765	—
1975	673	−1.81%
1982	641	−0.69%
1990	655	+0.27%
1999	707	+0.85%
2007	771	+1.09%
2012	809	+0.97%
2017	739	−1.79%
2023	735	−0.09%
Source: INSEE

== See also ==
- Communes of the Dordogne department
