= Château de l'Herm =

Castle in Rouffignac-Saint-Cernin-de-Reilhac, France

Coordinates: 45°04′41″N 0°57′35″E

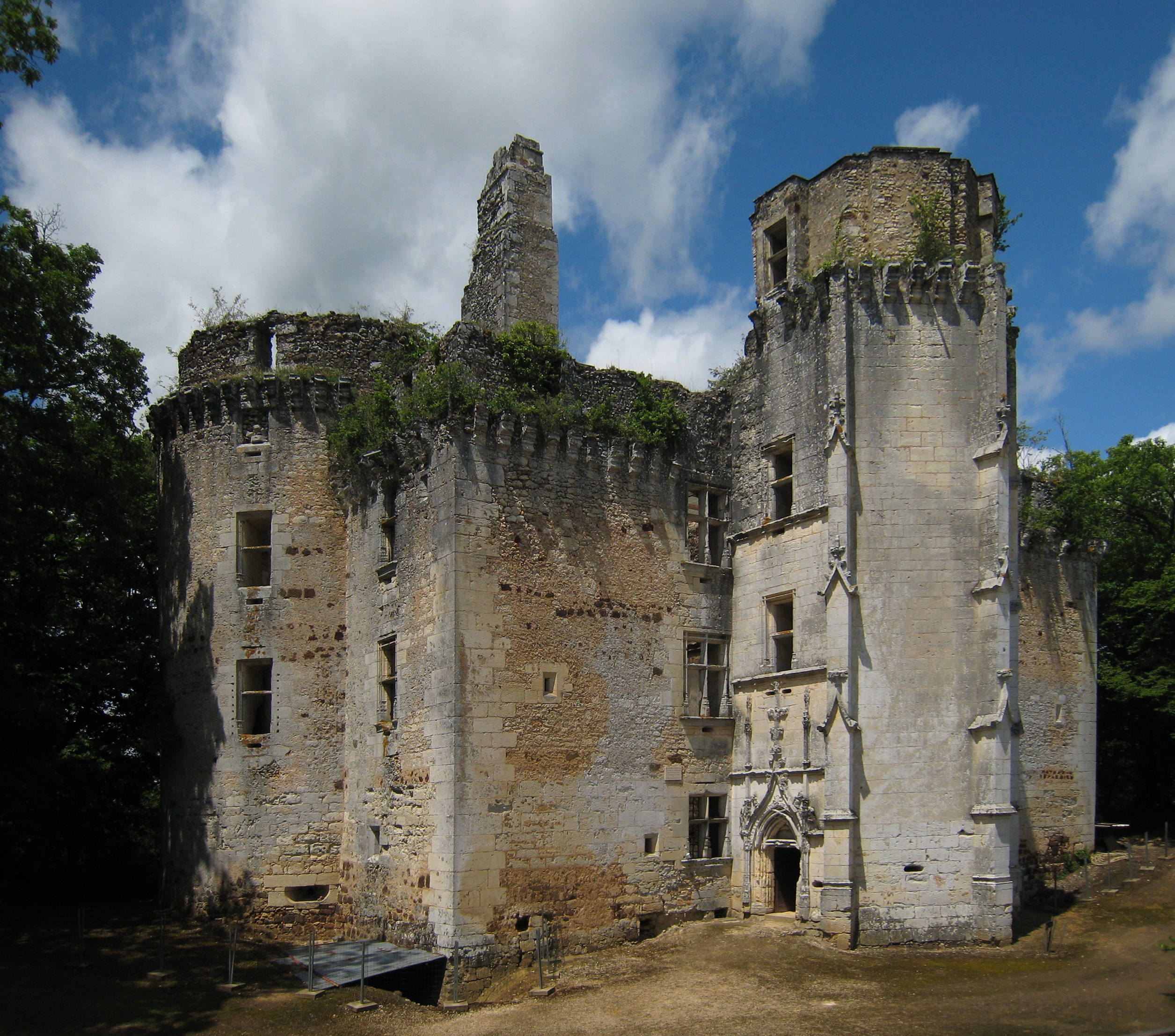

Château de l'Herm is a castle in the commune of Rouffignac-Saint-Cernin-de-Reilhac in the department of Dordogne in the Nouvelle-Aquitaine region of France. Construction took place between 1500 and 1520 in the Forêt Barade under the management of Jean de Calvimont, who served in the Bordeaux parliament and was ambassador of Francis I to Spain. The castle was abandoned after the family left in 1605.

Currently, the moats are still visible and the castle is open to visitors.

Eugène Le Roy used the castle as a setting in his 1899 novel Jacquou le Croquant, which uses many real place names and locations. It tells the story of a Barade forest peasant who rebels against the evil comte de Nansac who lives at the Château de l'Herm.

It has been listed since 1927 as a monument historique by the French Ministry of Culture.

== See also ==
- List of castles in France
