= La Force, Dordogne =

La Force
- Commune
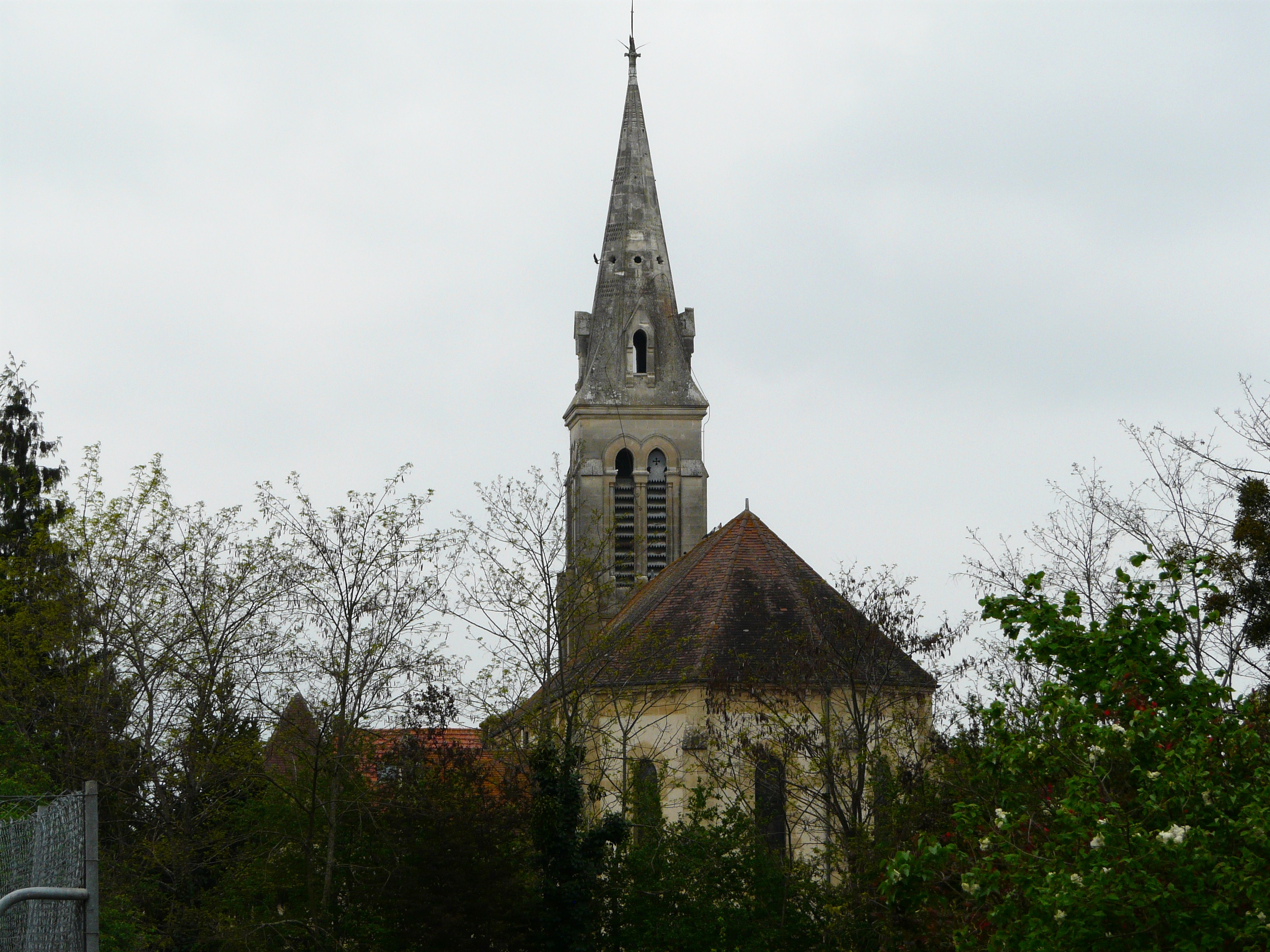
- The church in La Force

- Coat of arms
- Location of La Force
- Location within France Location within Nouvelle-Aquitaine
- Coordinates: 44°52′10″N 0°22′34″E
- Country: France
- Region: Nouvelle-Aquitaine
- Department: Dordogne
- Arrondissement: Bergerac
- Canton: Pays de la Force
- Intercommunality: CA Bergeracoise

Government
  - Mayor (2020–2026): Serge Pradier
- Area^{1}: 15.60 km^{2} (6.02 sq mi)
- Highest elevation: 116 m (381 ft)
- Lowest elevation: 12 m (39 ft)
- Population (2023): 2,702
  - Density: 173.2/km^{2} (448.6/sq mi)
- Time zone: UTC+01:00 (CET)
  - Summer (DST): UTC+02:00 (CEST)
- INSEE/Postal code: 24222 /24130
- ^{1} French Land Register data, which excludes lakes, ponds, glaciers > 1 km^{2} (0.386 sq mi or 247 acres) and river estuaries.

La Force (French pronunciation: [la fɔʁs]; Occitan: La Fòrça) is a commune in the Dordogne department in Nouvelle-Aquitaine in southwestern France.

== Population ==
Historical population
Year	Pop.	±% p.a.
1968	1,803	—
1975	1,846	+0.34%
1982	2,101	+1.87%
1990	2,261	+0.92%
1999	2,336	+0.36%
2007	2,517	+0.94%
2012	2,563	+0.36%
2017	2,674	+0.85%
2023	2,702	+0.17%
Source: INSEE

== See also ==
- Communes of the Dordogne department
- Henri François Xavier de Belsunce de Castelmoron
- John Bost
