= Montpeyroux =

Montpeyroux may refer to several communes in France:

- Montpeyroux, Aveyron
- Montpeyroux, Dordogne
- Montpeyroux, Hérault
- Montpeyroux, Puy-de-Dôme
