= Pineuilh =

- Commune
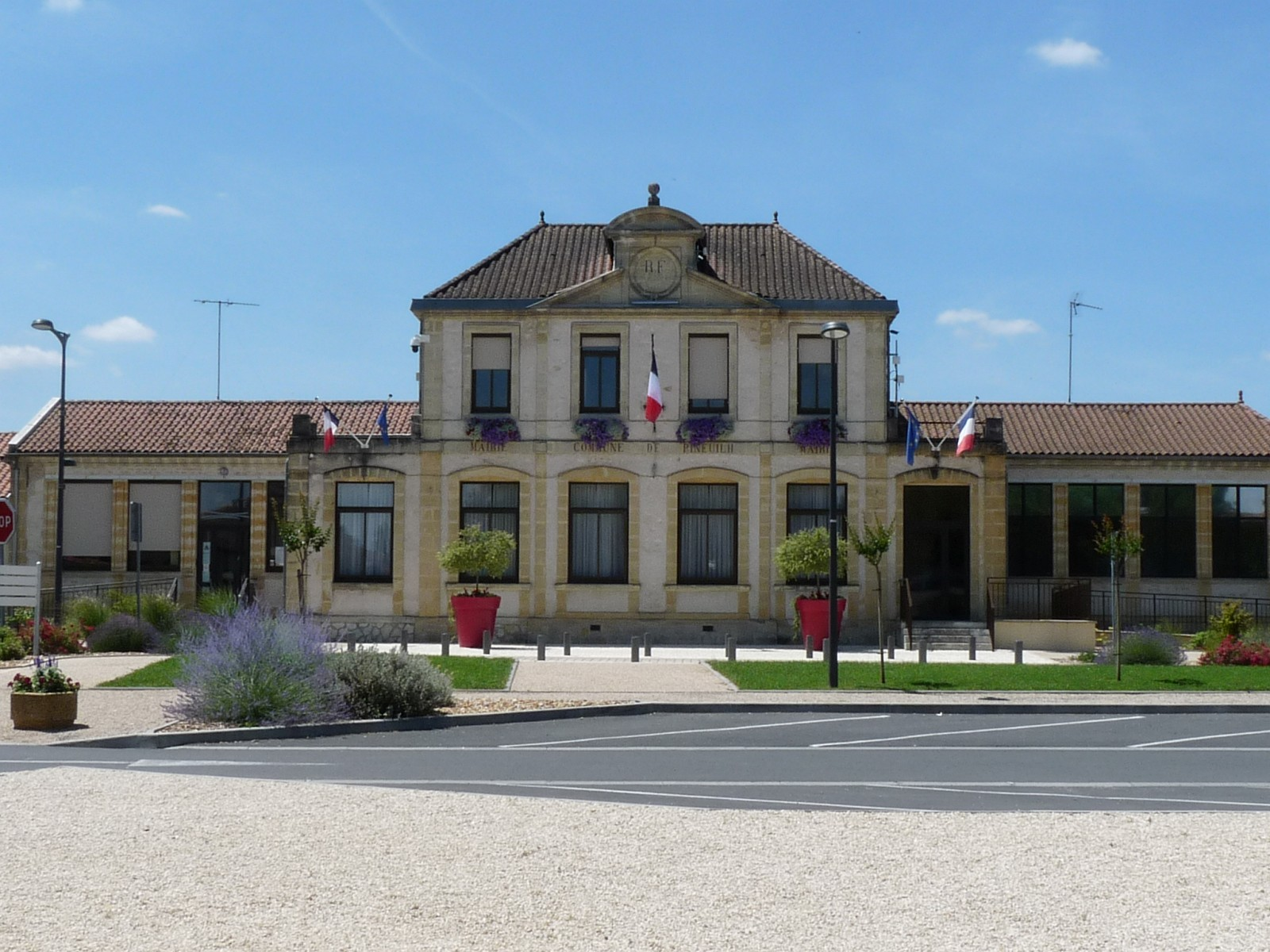
- The town hall in Pineuilh

- Coat of arms
- Location of Pineuilh
- Location within France Location within Nouvelle-Aquitaine
- Coordinates: 44°49′55″N 0°13′42″E
- Country: France
- Region: Nouvelle-Aquitaine
- Department: Gironde
- Arrondissement: Libourne
- Canton: Le Réolais et Les Bastides
- Intercommunality: Pays Foyen

Government
  - Mayor (2020–2026): Didier Teyssandier
- Area^{1}: 17.36 km^{2} (6.70 sq mi)
- Elevation: 25 m (82 ft)
- Highest elevation: 125 m (410 ft)
- Lowest elevation: 7 m (23 ft)
- Population (2023): 4,490
  - Density: 259/km^{2} (670/sq mi)
- Time zone: UTC+01:00 (CET)
  - Summer (DST): UTC+02:00 (CEST)
- INSEE/Postal code: 33324 /33220
- ^{1} French Land Register data, which excludes lakes, ponds, glaciers > 1 km^{2} (0.386 sq mi or 247 acres) and river estuaries.

Pineuilh (French pronunciation: [pinœj]; Occitan: Pinuelh) is a commune in the Gironde department in Nouvelle-Aquitaine in southwestern France.

== Geography ==
Pineuilh is the most populated commune in the canton of Réolais et des Bastides, with 4,307 inhabitants as of 1 January 2014. Located in the Gironde department, on the banks of the Dordogne River, Pineuilh lies at the gateway to the Périgord region and a few kilometers from the Pays de Duras. The French National Institute of Statistics and Economic Studies (INSEE) classifies Pineuilh as part of the Bergerac urban area.

The commune surrounds the bastide town of Sainte-Foy-la-Grande, in the Dordogne plain, and extends up onto the hillsides, forming a transition between the alluvial plain and the Entre-Deux-Mers wine-growing plateau.

=== Neighboring communes ===
Pineuilh borders seven other communes, including Port-Sainte-Foy-et-Ponchapt in the Dordogne department in two disjoint places, to the north and to the west-northwest, separated by Sainte-Foy-la-Grande.

=== Geology ===
The lower Dordogne plain, in which most of Pineuilh is located, is composed of recent alluvial deposits. These deposits consist of clayey-sandy silts and gravels, predominantly quartz.

At the foot of the hills, older alluvial deposits are found in narrow bands. These are formed of partially decalcified and reddened deposits (sandy clays and siliceous gravels, quartz, flint, granite, and some basalt pebbles).

The middle and lower parts of the hills are composed of Upper Eocene molasse. Together with the Fronsadais molasse, these form the slope of the hills. The latter is composed of sands of varying coarseness, sometimes accompanied by sandstone, or of clay generally rich in quartz and micaceous sands.

The upper part of the hills is wooded, it consists of a rocky ridge, the Castillon limestone: whitish lacustrine limestone from the lower Oligocene.

=== Climate ===
Several studies have been conducted to characterize the climatic types to which the national territory is exposed. The resulting zoning varies depending on the methods used, the nature and number of parameters considered, the territorial coverage of the data, and the reference period. In 2010, Pineuilh's climate was classified as an altered oceanic climate, according to a study by the French National Centre for Scientific Research (CNRS) based on a method combining climatic data and environmental factors (topography, land use, etc.) and data covering the period 1971-2000. In 2020, the predominant climate was classified as Cfa, according to the Köppen-Geiger classification, for the period 1988-2017, namely a temperate climate with hot summers and no dry season. Furthermore, in 2020, Météo-France published a new climate typology for metropolitan France, in which the municipality is located in a transition zone between oceanic and modified oceanic climates. It falls within the Aquitaine-Gascogne climate region, characterized by abundant rainfall in spring, moderate rainfall in autumn, low sunshine in spring, hot summers (19.5 °C), weak winds, frequent fog in autumn and winter, and frequent thunderstorms in summer (15 to 20 days). It is also located in zone H2c under the 2020 environmental regulations for new construction.

For the period 1971-2000, the average annual temperature was 12.9 °C, with an annual temperature range of 15.1 °C. The average annual rainfall was 792 mm, with 11.5 days of precipitation in January and 6.2 days in July. For the period 1991-2020, the average annual temperature observed at the nearest Météo-France weather station, located in the town of Bergerac 20 km away as the crow flies, was 13.2 °C, and the average annual rainfall was 792.9 mm. The maximum temperature recorded at this station was 42.1 °C, reached on 11 August 2025; the minimum temperature was -17.1 °C, reached on 9 February 2012.

=== Natural environments and biodiversity ===
==== Natura 2000 ====
La Dordogne is a Natura 2000 site limited to the departments of Dordogne and Gironde, and which covers the 104 communes along the Dordogne river, including Pineuilh. Sixteen animal species and one plant species listed in Annex II of European Union Directive 92/43/EEC have been recorded there.

==== ZNIEFF ====
Pineuilh is one of the 102 municipalities concerned by the natural area of ecological, faunal and floral interest (ZNIEFF) type II "La Dordogne", in which eight key animal species and fifty-seven key plant species have been listed, as well as forty-three other animal species and thirty-nine other plant species.

== Urban planning ==
=== Typology ===
As of 1 January 2024, Pineuilh is categorized as a small town, according to the new seven-level municipal population density scale defined by INSEE in 2022. It belongs to the Bergerac urban area, an interdepartmental agglomeration encompassing 22 communes, of which it is a suburban commune. Furthermore, the commune is part of the Pineuilh catchment area, of which it is the central commune. This area, which includes 16 communes, is categorized as having fewer than 50,000 inhabitants.

=== Land use ===
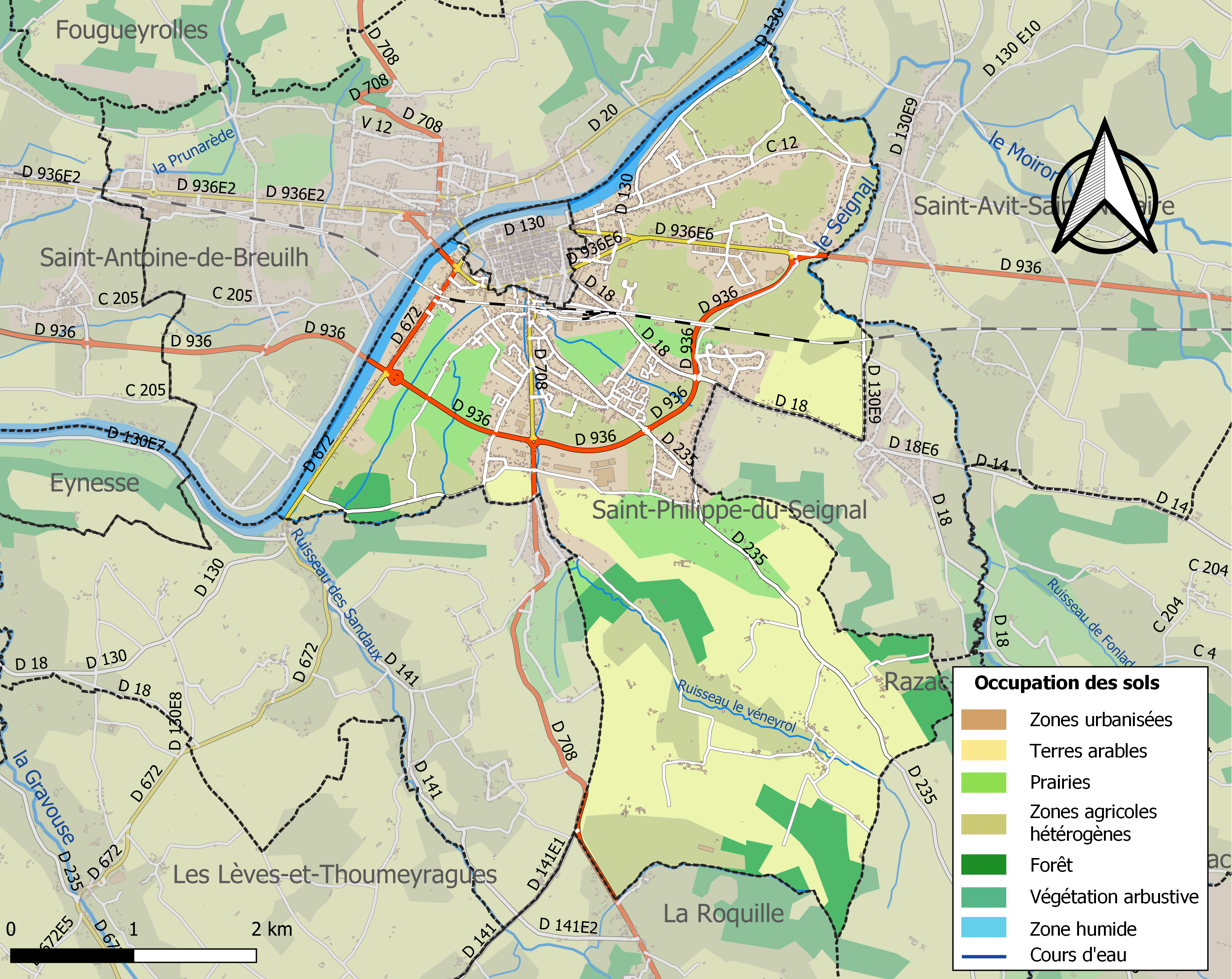
Map of infrastructure and land use in Pineuilh (CLC, 2018)

Land cover in Pineuilh, as shown in the European biophysical land cover database Corine Land Cover (CLC), is characterized by the significant presence of agricultural land (65.6% in 2018), a decrease compared to 1990 (75.2%). The detailed breakdown in 2018 is as follows: permanent crops (27.7%), heterogeneous agricultural areas (27.6%), urbanized areas (19.4%), grasslands (10.2%), forests (7.3%), industrial or commercial areas and communication networks (5.4%), inland waters (2.4%). The evolution of land use in the commune and its infrastructure can be observed on the different cartographic representations of the territory: the Cassini map (18th century), the general staff map (1820-1866) and the maps or aerial photos of the IGN for the current period (1950 to today).

=== Major risks ===
The territory of the commune of Pineuilh is vulnerable to various natural hazards: weather-related events (storms, thunderstorms, snow, extreme cold, heat waves, or droughts), flooding, landslides, and earthquakes (very low seismicity). It is also exposed to a technological risk: the potential failure of a dam. A website published by the BRGM (French Geological Survey) allows for a simple and quick assessment of the risks associated with a property, either by its address or its parcel number.

==== Natural risks ====
Pineuilh is part of the Bergerac area of significant flood risk (TRI), which includes 22 commune (15 in Dordogne and 7 in Gironde) affected by the risk of the Dordogne River overflowing its banks. This is one of the 18 TRIs established at the end of 2012 for the Adour-Garonne basin. Significant events prior to 2014 include the 1843 flood (4,100 m³/s in Bergerac, the historical reference flood with a return period of at least 100 years), the floods of 1912, 1944, and 1952 (50-year return period), and the floods of 1982 and 1994 (20-year return period). Flood zone maps have been created for three scenarios: frequent (floods with a return period of 10 to 30 years), medium (return period of 100 to 300 years), and extreme (return period of approximately 1,000 years, which overwhelms any flood protection system). The commune has been declared a natural disaster area due to damage caused by floods and mudslides in 1982, 1993, 1999, 2008, and 2009.

The types of ground movements likely to occur in Pineuilh include landslides, rockfalls, and boulder falls.

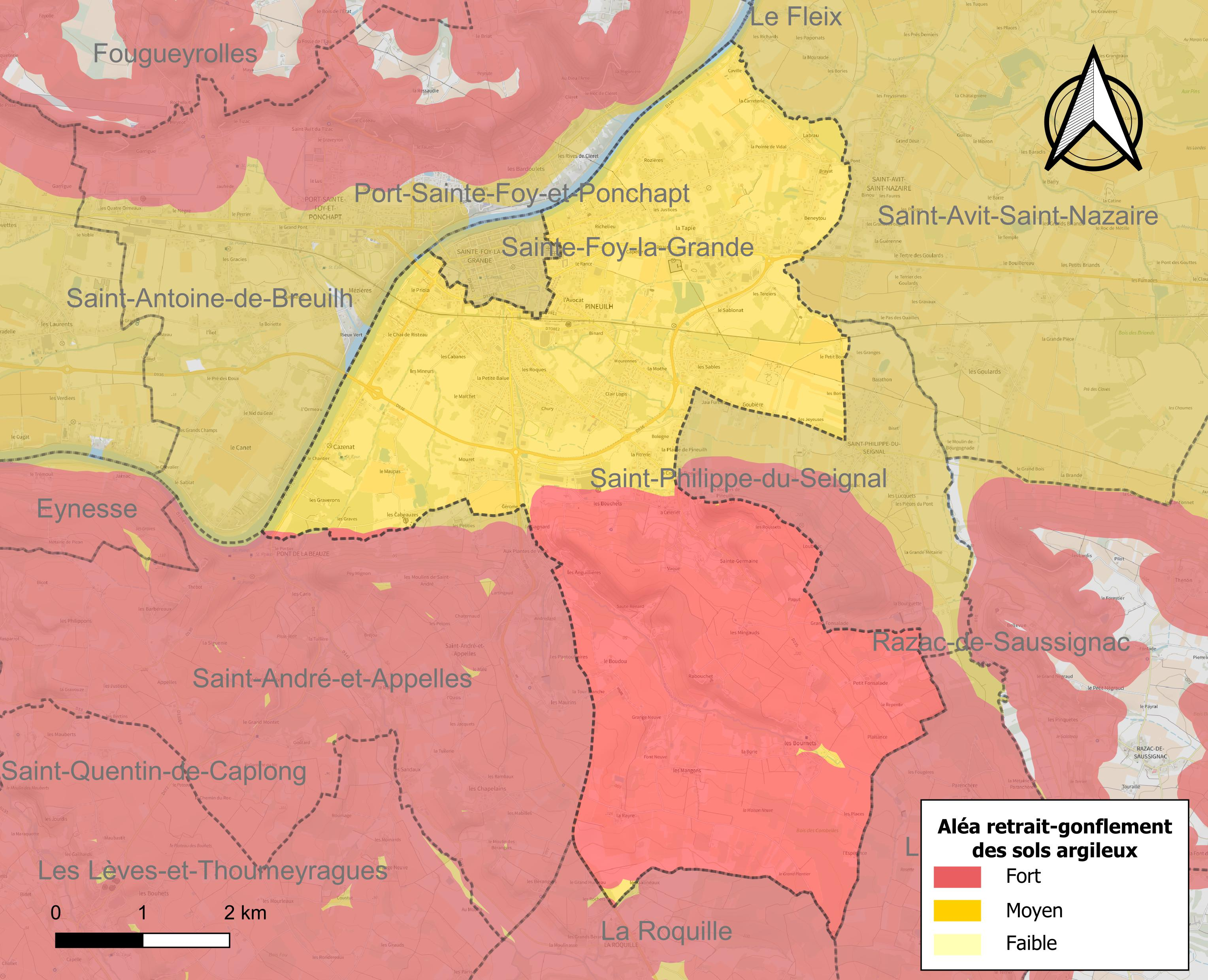
Map of the shrink-swell hazard zones of clay soils in Pineuilh.

The shrinkage and swelling of clay soils can cause significant damage to buildings in the event of alternating periods of drought and rain. 99.8% of the Pineuilh's area is at medium or high risk (67.4% at the departmental level and 48.5% at the national level). Of the 2,074 buildings counted in the commune in 2019, 2,074 are at medium or high risk, representing 100%, compared to 84% at the departmental level and 54% at the national level. A map of the national territory's exposure to clay soil shrinkage and swelling is available on the BRGM website.

Furthermore, to better understand the risk of ground subsidence, the national inventory of underground cavities allows for the identification of those located within the commune.

Regarding landslides, the commune has been recognized as being in a state of natural disaster due to damage caused by drought in 2005, 2011, 2012, 2015 and 2017, by landslides in 1999 and by landslides in 1993.

==== Technological risks ====
Pineuilh is also located downstream from the Bort-les-Orgues dam, a Class A structure on the Dordogne River subject to a Flood Risk Prevention Plan (PPI), with a reservoir capacity of 477 million cubic meters. As such, it is likely to be affected by the flood wave resulting from the dam's failure.

== Name ==
It was traditionally accepted that the name Pineuilh had a Celtic origin meaning "Point of the rock."

The Robert dictionary, however, offers another explanation: the oldest texts contain the name Pinolio (see below), which comes from the Gaulish ialo (clearing) and the Latin pinus (pine). The name Pinolio would therefore mean "the clearing of the pines."

Until the 17th century, it was written Pineil, sometimes Pineuilh, and in the 18th century, Pineuil appears. The current spelling Pineuilh is therefore relatively recent.

In Gascon, the name of the town is Pinuelh.

== History ==
=== Prehistory ===
Recent archaeological research confirms that the Pineuilh plain was inhabited as early as the Late Neolithic period. It can be assumed that a hamlet was established during this time.

Similarly, evidence of occupation dates back to the Late Bronze Age. However, this evidence does not support permanent settlement and seems to reflect seasonal activities.

=== The Gallo-Roman period ===
In 1851, the discoveries of Abbot Audierne attested to the site's occupation during the Gallo-Roman period: "We recovered several Roman coins from the High Empire... [and] some fragments of statues." Generally, remains of dwellings have been found scattered along the Dordogne River.

Apart from this archaeological information, we have no precise details about this period.

=== Middle Ages and the Ancien Régime ===
The Feudal Period and the Ancien Régime.

In 2002-2003, a settlement dating back to the late 10th century was excavated in the Pineuilh area, at a waterlogged site known as La Mothe. It consists of the remains of a motte-and-bailey castle, 30 meters in diameter, surrounded by a ditch crossed by a footbridge made of alder logs on oak posts, providing access to the earth and timber building. Among the artifacts found were numerous horseshoes and pieces of harness and weaponry, as well as two pawns from two different chess sets. One of the elephant ivory pieces has an exact replica in Samarkand (Uzbekistan). Only the eastern half of the small, circular, moated enclosure, built in an oxbow lake of the Dordogne River, was excavated. The site, founded in the 10th century, was transformed into a motte during the 11th century.

La paroisse de Pineuilh. Under the Ancien Régime, Pineuilh was a parish in the Agenais region, bordered to the north and east by the dioceses of Périgueux and Sarlat. The earliest document proving the attachment of the parish of Pineuilh to the diocese of Agen is the Cartulary of Conques (see below), dating from the 11th century. However, we lack the information necessary to determine when Pineuilh came under the influence of the Agenais diocese. In the 11th century, the diocese of Agen was organized into three archdeaconries. Pineuilh was integrated into the archdeaconry of Besaume, whose seat was located in Le Mas-d'Agenais. The name of the church appears for the first time in the Cartulary of Conques: Sanctus Martinus de Braigs (Saint Martin of Braigs).

Le Château de Pineuilh. We know little about the Château de Pineuilh, which first appears in 1168 in the Grand Cartulary of the Abbey of La Sauve-Majeure under the term "castrum." The castle is said to have been built on the natural promontory that rises above the village and the church, at an altitude of approximately 90 meters, and from which one can see the Dordogne River loop and the entire plain between Sainte-Foy-la-Grande and Gardonne. Similarly, considerable uncertainty remains regarding the place of the lords of Pineuilh within the medieval system of vassalage. The fact that the Bouville family were lords of Pineuilh suggests that Pineuilh was attached to the viscounty of Besaume. The Bouville family themselves were viscounts of Besaume for a time. Similarly, this hypothesis offers a certain consistency with the attachment of the parish to the archdeaconry of Besaume, even if these two notions must be distinguished.

The donation to the Abbey of Conques. The oldest documents concerning Pineuilh are found in the Cartulary of Conques, compiled between 1074 and 1076. It records a donation made by Falco de Barta (or Falcon de la Barde) who ceded in allodial tenure to the Abbey of Conques (see the article on the Abbey Church of Sainte-Foy in Conques, a Benedictine abbey in Rouergue), the church "Sanctus Martinus de Braxis de Pinolio" (Saint-Martin-de-Braigs of Pineuilh) with all the dependent presbytery. In 1076, Falcon de la Barde granted a second donation to the Abbey of Conques, his manor of Veneyrol, on the condition that a church be built there.

The founding of the bastide of Sainte-Foy. This manor was the subject of a second donation in the 13th century. Alphonse of Poitiers, brother of King Louis IX of France (Saint Louis), had married the daughter of Raymond VII, Count of Toulouse. Upon the latter's death, he became the ruler of the Agenais region, which included Pineuilh and the neighboring parishes. He immediately grasped the importance of this territory, which jutted like a wedge into the Aquitaine possessions of the King of England. In 1255, Alphonse of Poitiers obtained from the prior of Sainte-Foy near Pineuilh the land necessary for the construction of a bastide (fortified town). This land roughly corresponded to the former manor of Veneyrol belonging to Falcon de la Barde.

It was therefore necessary to regulate relations between the bastide of Sainte-Foy, placed under the direct protection of the Count of Poitiers, and the surrounding areas of the new bastide, which were subject to local lords, especially since the inhabitants of the bastide enjoyed privileges that could encourage neighboring populations to settle within its walls. Accordingly, the prior of Sainte-Foy stipulated that his men living outside the walls and their descendants would not be admitted to the bastide. For their part, Ysarn and Arnaud de Boville, lords of Pineuilh, retained their right of justice within their castle and over their men. They continued to collect tolls, dues, and other taxes.

=== Contemporary history ===
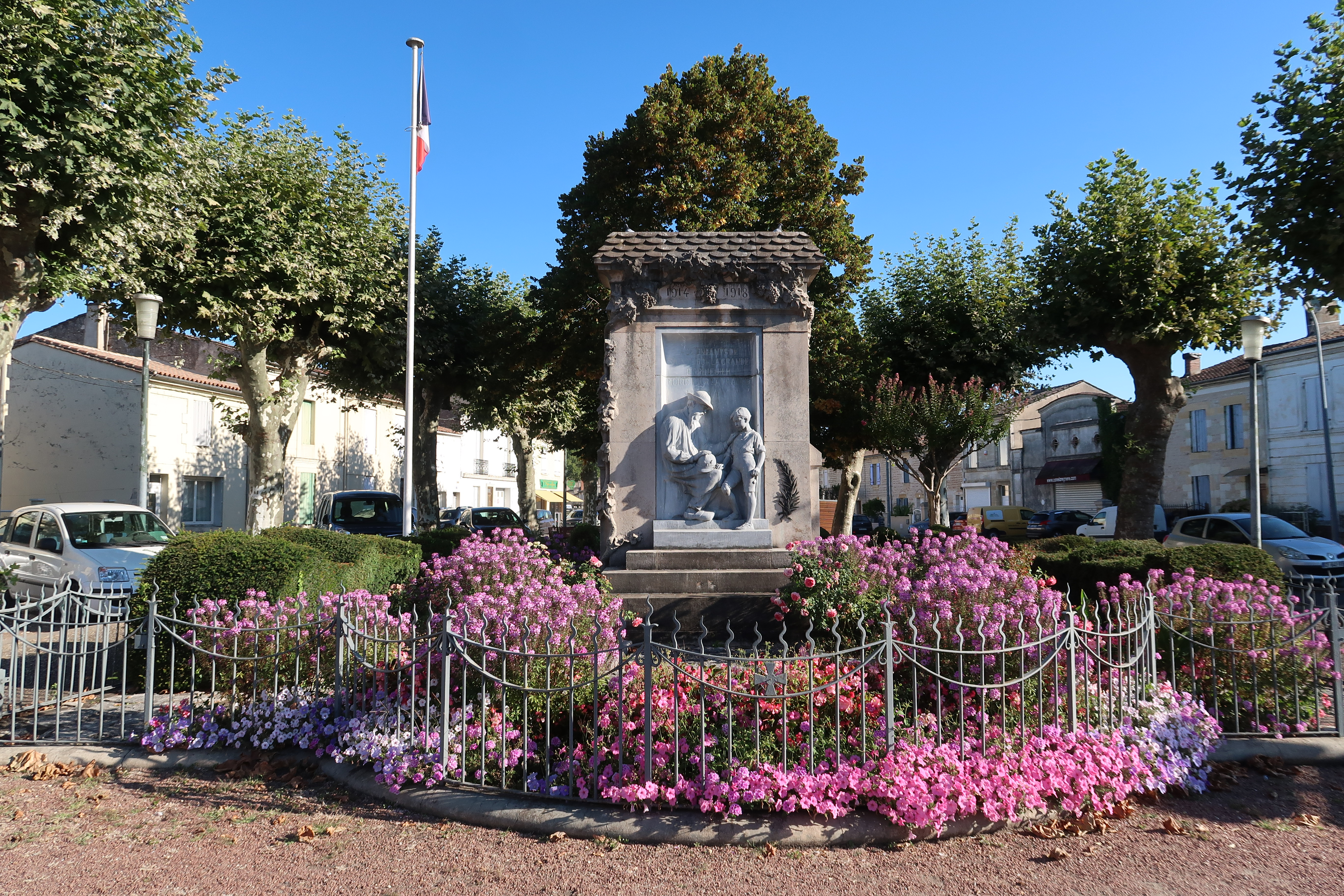
The World War I memorial shared with Sainte-Foy-la-Grande, place Aristide-Briand.

In 1919, Ernest Flageol, the mayor of Sainte-Foy-la-Grande, announced the future construction of a World War I memorial, hoping it would be shared with Pineuilh. However, the project dragged on; initially entrusted to the sculptor Marcel Bouraine, it was ultimately awarded to Jean Camus. Embedded within the monument is a sculpture representing, according to the contract established at the time, "the threshold of a home whose son has gone there forever… On the threshold remain the grandfather and the child; a helmet with a hole in it resting on his knee, the grandfather bequeaths to the orphan the veneration of the heroic past, which the child will later, in turn, pass on." Engraved on the back are 86 names of residents of Sainte-Foy-la-Grande (including one woman) and 52 inhabitants of Pineuilh. It was inaugurated in 1924, opposite the elementary school (on the current Place Aristide-Briand) in order, according to the initial project, to perpetuate "in a lasting way in the eyes and hearts of future generations the memory of this period of global turmoil and sacrifice so nobly accepted by their elders".

== Population ==
Its inhabitants are called Pineuilhais in French.

Historical population
Year	Pop.	±% p.a.
1968	3,057	—
1975	3,493	+1.92%
1982	3,542	+0.20%
1990	3,512	−0.11%
1999	3,645	+0.41%
2007	4,133	+1.58%
2012	4,336	+0.96%
2017	4,394	+0.27%
2023	4,490	+0.36%
Source: INSEE

== Economy ==
=== Shops ===
General de Gaulle Square is home to several small shops.

In 2012, the Leclerc Grand Pineuilh shopping center opened. Located in the Bouchets commercial zone, near the ring road, it replaced two smaller stores, one in Pineuilh-Arbalestrier and the other in the neighboring town of Port-Sainte-Foy-et-Ponchapt.

== Local culture and heritage ==
=== Places and monuments ===
- The parish church of Saint-Martin was extensively restored and enlarged at the end of the 19th century, and then completely restored externally in the spring of 2017.
- The mill at the locality known as Les Bournets.
- The rural wash houses at the localities known as Les Mangons and Les Bournets.
- The communes of Sainte-Foy-la-Grande and Pineuilh share the distinction of having a common war memorial, located within the territory of the bastide town of Sainte-Foy-la-Grande.
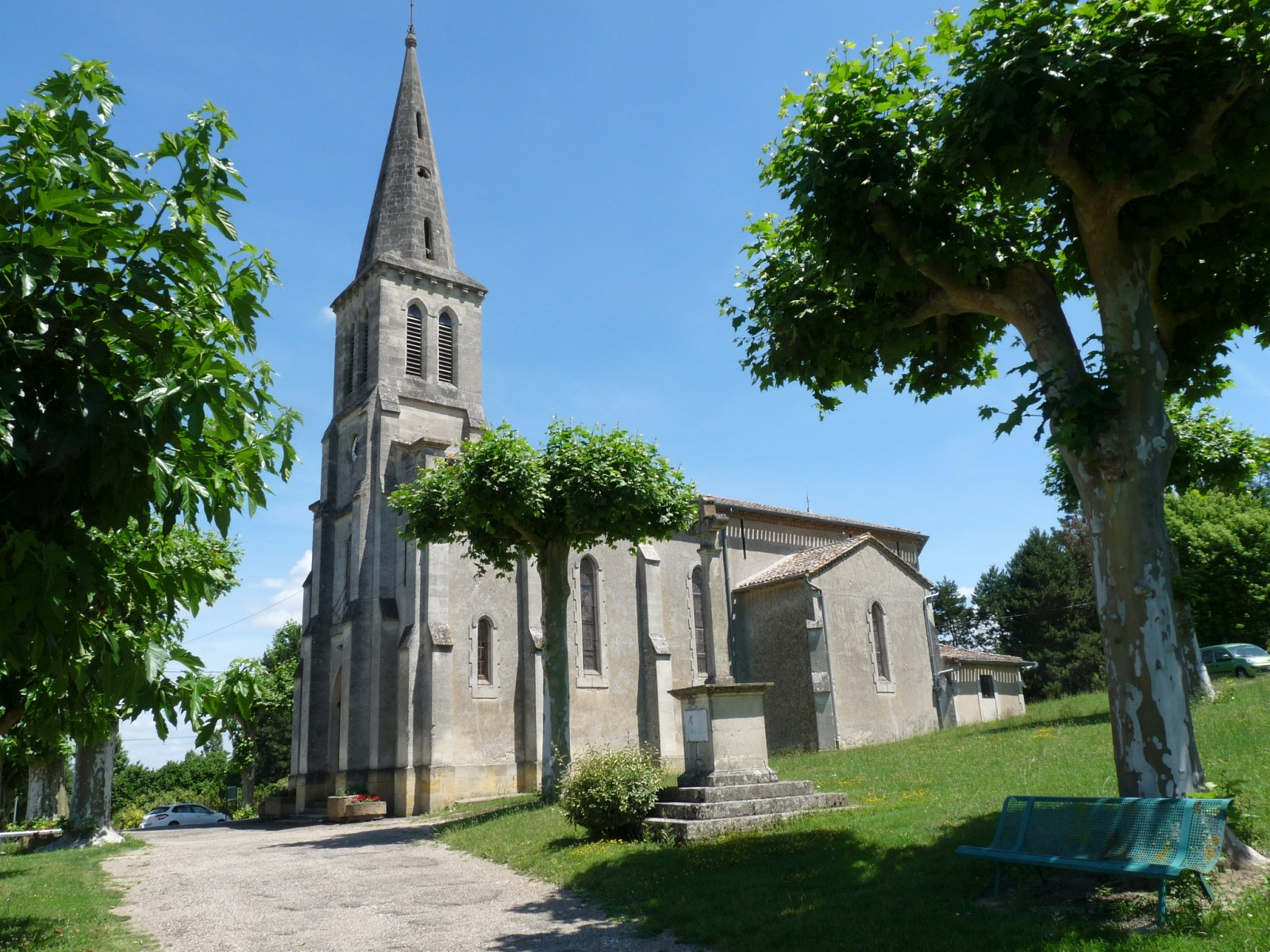
Saint Martin's Church

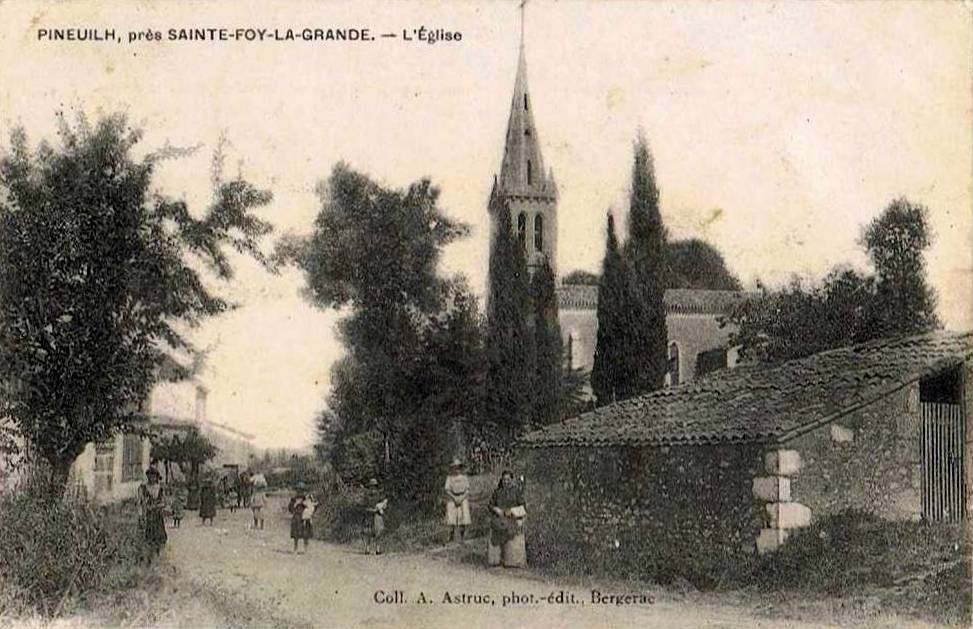
The church on an old postcard

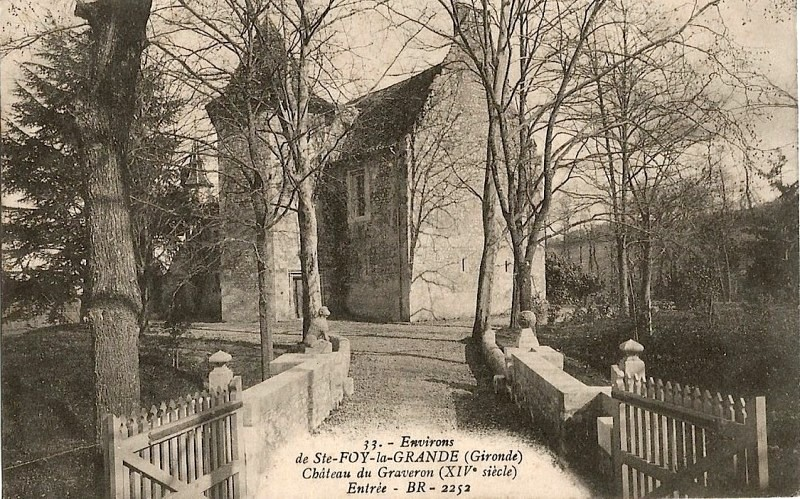
Graveron Castle

=== Personalities linked to the commune ===
- Roger Lanrezac, known as Roger Lanzac (1920-1996), was a television and entertainment personality and the founder of the eponymous circus.
- Marguerite Plaisir, a teacher, is the author of an autobiographical work, *Gens de Pineuilh*, as well as a second book entitled *Lettre à Bobo*, a posthumous tribute to a young man from Pineuilh who died in Fresnes prison at the age of 22 due to lack of medical care. Both books are published by La Fontaine secrète.
- Pierre-Raymond Villemiane, a cyclist, was born on 12 March 1951, in Pineuilh.

== Heraldry ==
Arms of Pineuilh	Divided, first azure with the remains of the castle of the place or masoned sable placed on an isolated hill vert, second gules with a maritime pine or, on a chief vert charged with a baron's coronet or. Official, available on the commune's website.

== See also ==
- Communes of the Gironde department

== Bibliography ==
- A study by Sylvie Faravel, lecturer in medieval history and archaeology at the Bordeaux Montaigne University, focusing on Pineuilh between the 10th and 13th centuries.
- Jacques Reix, La Dordogne du temps des bateliers, Fanlac, 1990.
- Jacques Reix et Jean Vircoulon, Chronique des années de Guerre en pays foyen, Fanlac, 1995.
- Jacques Reix, Gabariers et bateliers de la Dordogne, Fanlac, 2003.
- Jacques Reix, Sainte-Foy-la-Grande et le pays foyen, Nouvelles Éditions Sutton, 2005.
- Jacques Reix, Le pays foyen dans la guerre, 1939-1945, Nouvelles Éditions Sutton, 2007.
- Jacques Reix, Un siècle de vie sportive en pays foyen, Nouvelles Éditions Sutton, 2008.
- Jacques Reix, Entre Gironde et Périgord. Le pays foyen. Bastides et villages, La Lauze, 2012.
