= Saint-Rémy, Dordogne =

Saint-Rémy
- Commune
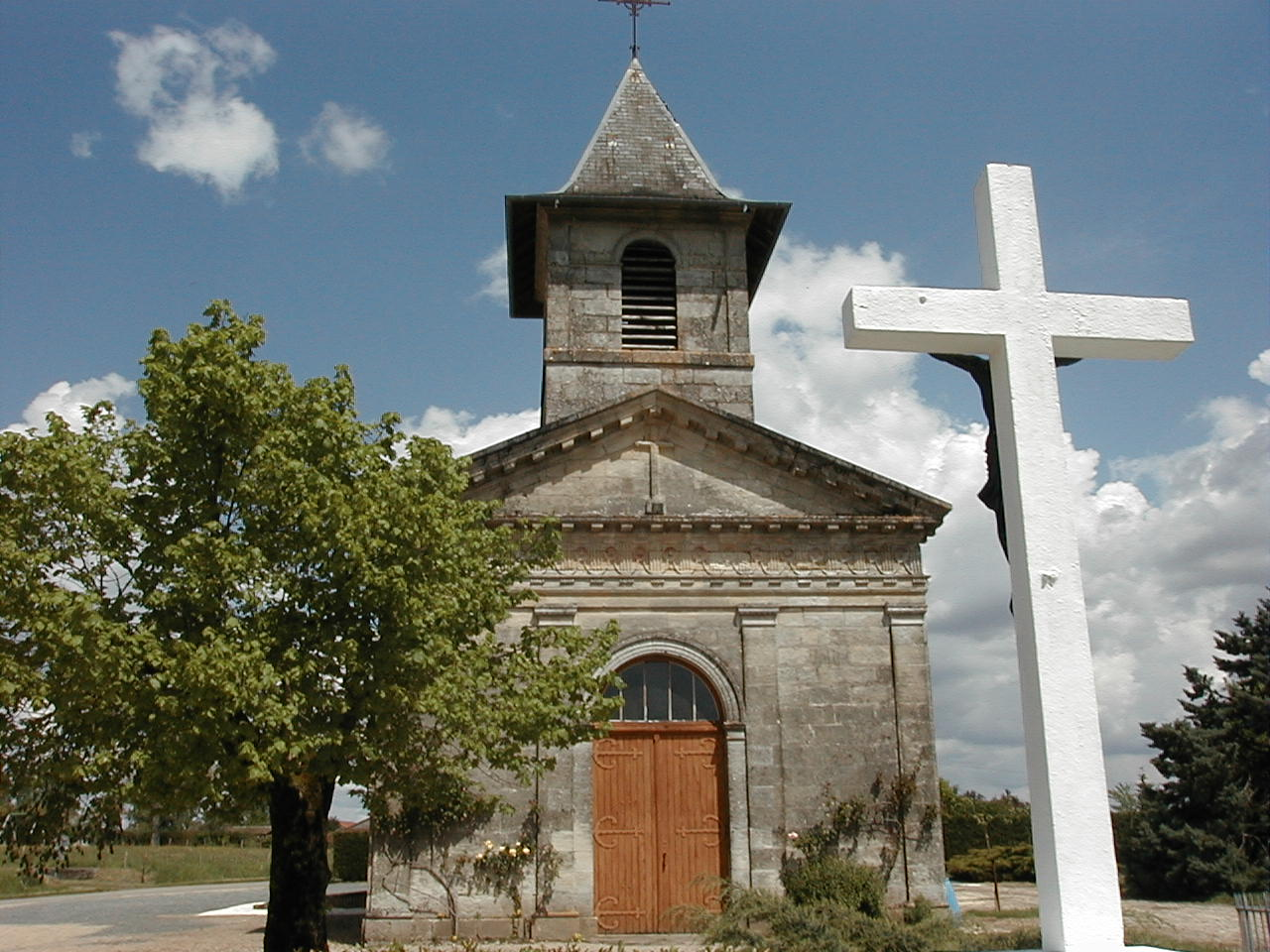
- The church in Saint-Rémy

- Coat of arms
- Location of Saint-Rémy
- Location within France Location within Nouvelle-Aquitaine
- Coordinates: 44°56′47″N 0°11′08″E
- Country: France
- Region: Nouvelle-Aquitaine
- Department: Dordogne
- Arrondissement: Bergerac
- Canton: Pays de Montaigne et Gurson

Government
  - Mayor (2020–2026): Eric Fretillere
- Area^{1}: 22.26 km^{2} (8.59 sq mi)
- Elevation: 96 m (315 ft)
- Highest elevation: 111 m (364 ft)
- Lowest elevation: 33 m (108 ft)
- Population (2023): 503
  - Density: 22.6/km^{2} (58.5/sq mi)
- Time zone: UTC+01:00 (CET)
  - Summer (DST): UTC+02:00 (CEST)
- INSEE/Postal code: 24494 /24700
- ^{1} French Land Register data, which excludes lakes, ponds, glaciers > 1 km^{2} (0.386 sq mi or 247 acres) and river estuaries.

Saint-Rémy (French pronunciation: [sɛ̃ ʁemi]; Occitan: Sent Remedi) is a commune in the Dordogne department in Nouvelle-Aquitaine in southwestern France.

== Population ==
Historical population
| Year | Pop. | ±% p.a. |
|---|---|---|
| 1968 | 359 | — |
| 1975 | 355 | −0.16% |
| 1982 | 338 | −0.70% |
| 1990 | 358 | +0.72% |
| 1999 | 353 | −0.16% |
| 2007 | 450 | +3.08% |
| 2012 | 422 | −1.28% |
| 2017 | 516 | +4.10% |
| 2023 | 503 | −0.42% |
Source: INSEE

== See also ==
- Communes of the Dordogne department
