= Nastringues =

- Commune
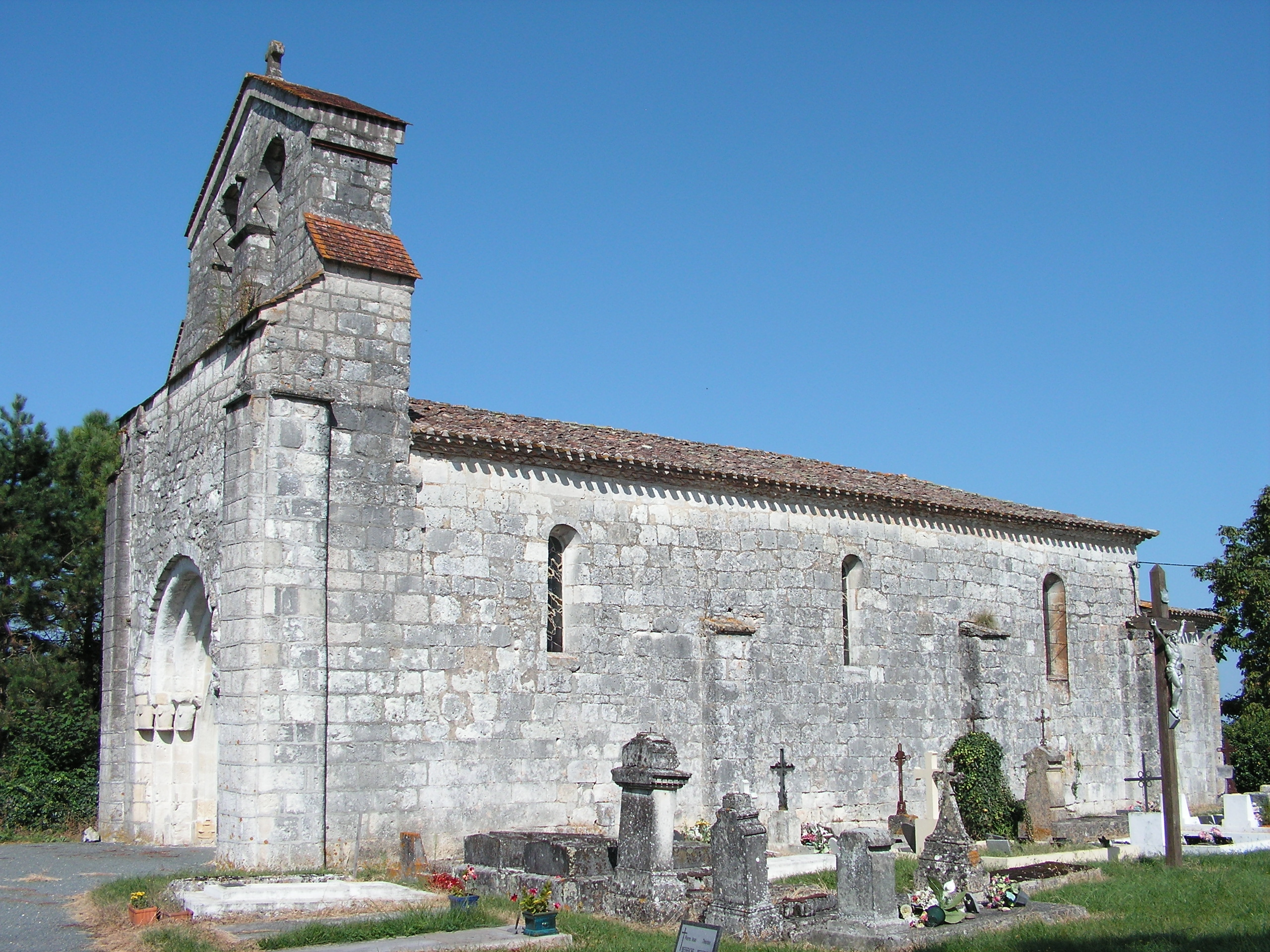
- The church in Nastringues
- Location of Nastringues
- Location within France Location within Nouvelle-Aquitaine
- Coordinates: 44°52′33″N 0°09′16″E
- Country: France
- Region: Nouvelle-Aquitaine
- Department: Dordogne
- Arrondissement: Bergerac
- Canton: Pays de Montaigne et Gurson
- Intercommunality: Montaigne Montravel et Gurson

Government
  - Mayor (2020–2026): Christian Scaliger
- Area^{1}: 6.22 km^{2} (2.40 sq mi)
- Elevation: 82 m (269 ft)
- Highest elevation: 114 m (374 ft)
- Lowest elevation: 35 m (115 ft)
- Population (2023): 138
  - Density: 22.2/km^{2} (57.5/sq mi)
- Time zone: UTC+01:00 (CET)
  - Summer (DST): UTC+02:00 (CEST)
- INSEE/Postal code: 24306 /24230
- ^{1} French Land Register data, which excludes lakes, ponds, glaciers > 1 km^{2} (0.386 sq mi or 247 acres) and river estuaries.

Nastringues (French pronunciation: [nastʁɛ̃ɡ]; Occitan: Nastrengas) is a commune in the Dordogne department in Nouvelle-Aquitaine in southwestern France.

== Population ==
Historical population
Year	Pop.	±% p.a.
1968	112	—
1975	118	+0.75%
1982	113	−0.62%
1990	114	+0.11%
1999	115	+0.10%
2007	113	−0.22%
2012	107	−1.09%
2017	117	+1.80%
2023	138	+2.79%
Source: INSEE

== See also ==
- Communes of the Dordogne department
