= Saint-Antoine-de-Breuilh =

- Commune
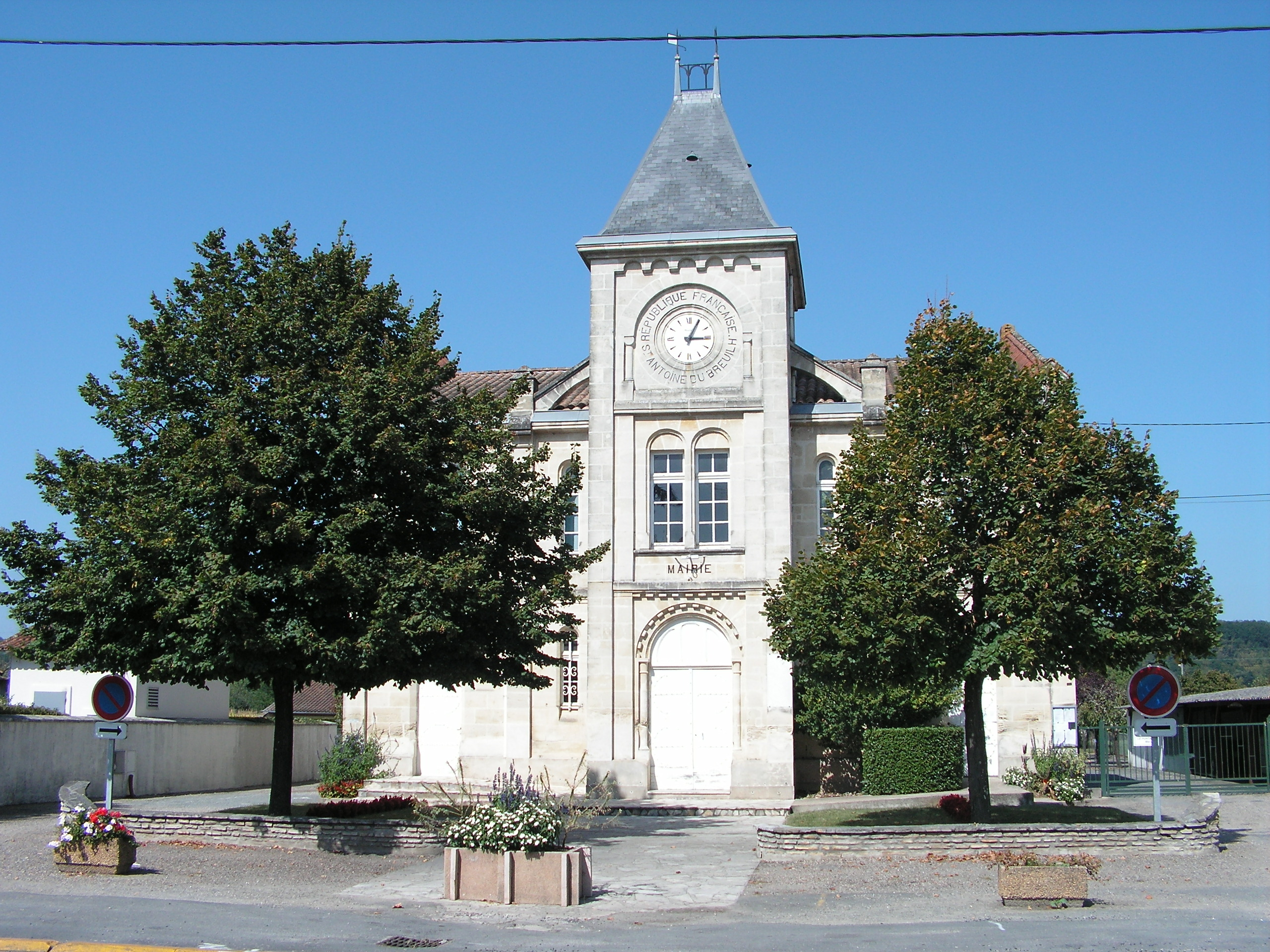
- Town hall

- Coat of arms
- Location of Saint-Antoine-de-Breuilh
- Location within France Location within Nouvelle-Aquitaine
- Coordinates: 44°50′42″N 0°09′20″E
- Country: France
- Region: Nouvelle-Aquitaine
- Department: Dordogne
- Arrondissement: Bergerac
- Canton: Pays de Montaigne et Gurson
- Intercommunality: Montaigne Montravel et Gurson

Government
  - Mayor (2020–2026): Christian Gallot
- Area^{1}: 17.82 km^{2} (6.88 sq mi)
- Elevation: 18 m (59 ft)
- Highest elevation: 113 m (371 ft)
- Lowest elevation: 7 m (23 ft)
- Population (2023): 1,784
  - Density: 100.1/km^{2} (259.3/sq mi)
- Time zone: UTC+01:00 (CET)
  - Summer (DST): UTC+02:00 (CEST)
- INSEE/Postal code: 24370 /24230
- ^{1} French Land Register data, which excludes lakes, ponds, glaciers > 1 km^{2} (0.386 sq mi or 247 acres) and river estuaries.

Saint-Antoine-de-Breuilh (French pronunciation: [sɛ̃.t‿ɑ̃twan də bʁœj]; Occitan: Sent Antòni del Bruèlh) is a commune in the Dordogne department in Nouvelle-Aquitaine in southwestern France, in the urban unit of Bergerac. It was created in 1824 with the fusion of Saint-Aulaye and Le Breuilh. Saint-Antoine-de-Breuilh station has rail connections to Bordeaux, Bergerac and Sarlat-la-Canéda.

== Population ==
Historical population
Year	Pop.	±% p.a.
1968	1,415	—
1975	1,534	+1.16%
1982	1,523	−0.10%
1990	1,756	+1.80%
1999	1,844	+0.54%
2007	2,035	+1.24%
2012	1,990	−0.45%
2017	1,877	−1.16%
2023	1,784	−0.84%
Source: INSEE

== See also ==
- Communes of the Dordogne department
