= Montazeau =

- Commune
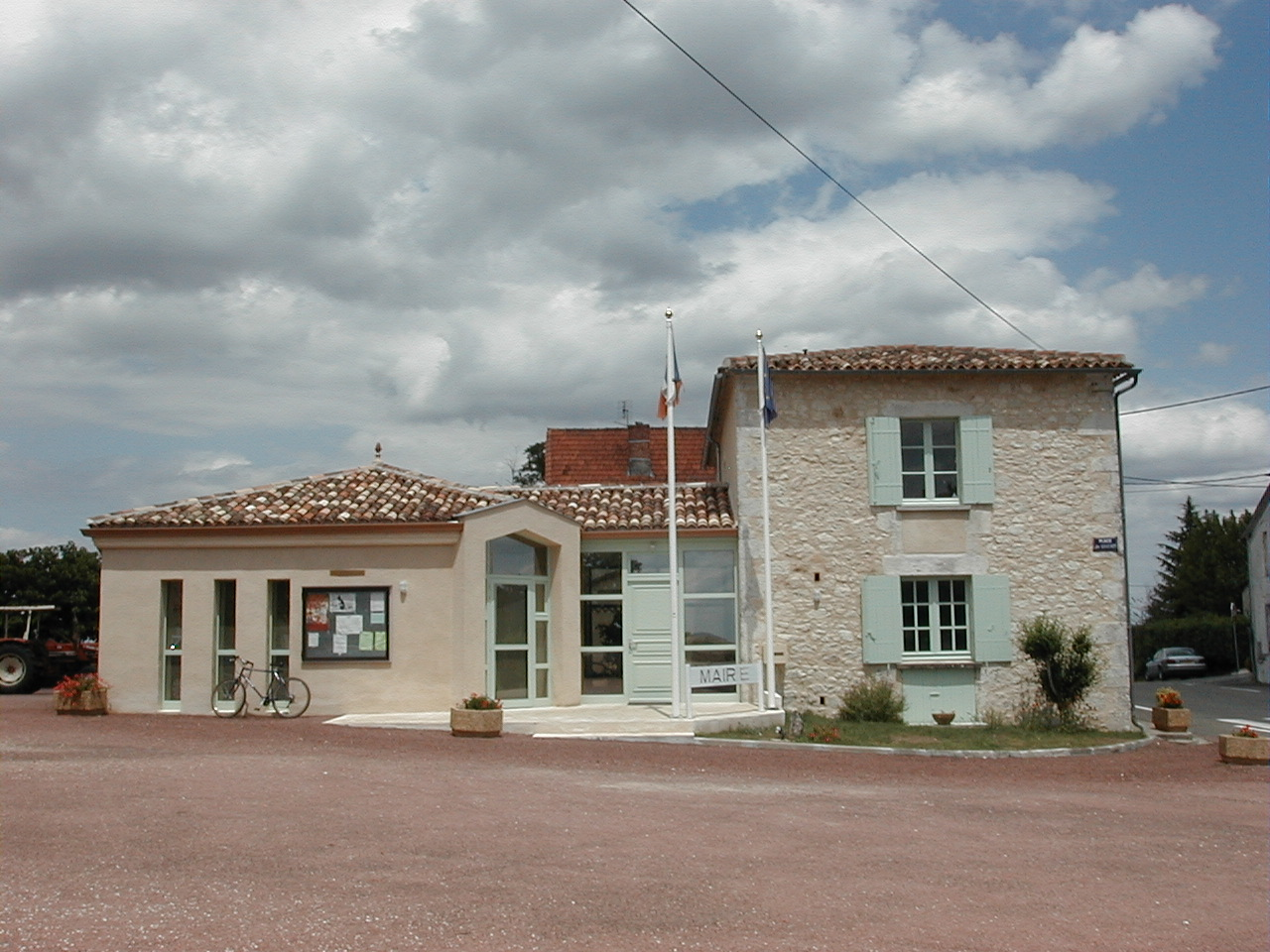
- The town hall in Montazeau
- Location of Montazeau
- Location within France Location within Nouvelle-Aquitaine
- Coordinates: 44°53′38″N 0°07′51″E
- Country: France
- Region: Nouvelle-Aquitaine
- Department: Dordogne
- Arrondissement: Bergerac
- Canton: Pays de Montaigne et Gurson
- Intercommunality: Montaigne Montravel et Gurson

Government
  - Mayor (2020–2026): Didier Moreau
- Area^{1}: 13.78 km^{2} (5.32 sq mi)
- Highest elevation: 113 m (371 ft)
- Lowest elevation: 27 m (89 ft)
- Population (2023): 292
  - Density: 21.2/km^{2} (54.9/sq mi)
- Time zone: UTC+01:00 (CET)
  - Summer (DST): UTC+02:00 (CEST)
- INSEE/Postal code: 24288 /24230
- ^{1} French Land Register data, which excludes lakes, ponds, glaciers > 1 km^{2} (0.386 sq mi or 247 acres) and river estuaries.

Montazeau (French pronunciation: [mɔ̃tazo]; Occitan: Montaseus) is a commune in the Dordogne department in Nouvelle-Aquitaine in southwestern France.

It is fairly close to Bergerac and Bordeaux. Many of its inhabitants derive their principal income from winemaking.

== Population ==
Historical population
| Year | Pop. | ±% p.a. |
|---|---|---|
| 1968 | 342 | — |
| 1975 | 289 | −2.38% |
| 1982 | 280 | −0.45% |
| 1990 | 267 | −0.59% |
| 1999 | 275 | +0.33% |
| 2007 | 297 | +0.97% |
| 2012 | 315 | +1.18% |
| 2017 | 296 | −1.24% |
| 2023 | 292 | −0.23% |
Source: INSEE

== See also ==
- Communes of the Dordogne department
