= Saint-Seurin-de-Prats =

- Commune
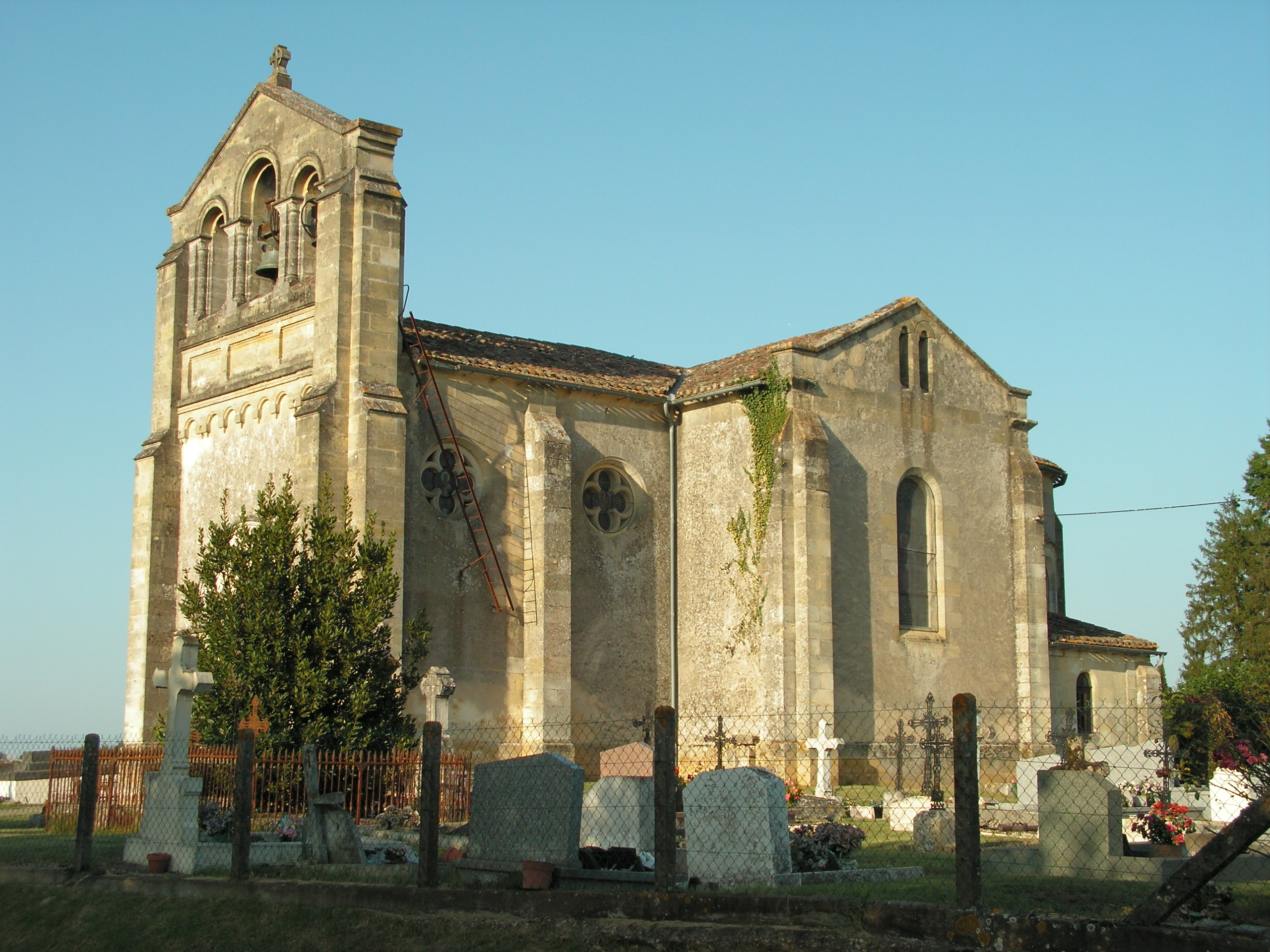
- The church in Saint-Seurin-de-Prats
- Location of Saint-Seurin-de-Prats
- Location within France Location within Nouvelle-Aquitaine
- Coordinates: 44°49′45″N 0°04′32″E
- Country: France
- Region: Nouvelle-Aquitaine
- Department: Dordogne
- Arrondissement: Bergerac
- Canton: Pays de Montaigne et Gurson
- Intercommunality: Montaigne Montravel et Gurson

Government
  - Mayor (2020–2026): Dominique Iberto
- Area^{1}: 5.56 km^{2} (2.15 sq mi)
- Elevation: 12 m (39 ft)
- Highest elevation: 15 m (49 ft)
- Lowest elevation: 3 m (9.8 ft)
- Population (2023): 461
  - Density: 82.9/km^{2} (215/sq mi)
- Time zone: UTC+01:00 (CET)
  - Summer (DST): UTC+02:00 (CEST)
- INSEE/Postal code: 24501 /24230
- ^{1} French Land Register data, which excludes lakes, ponds, glaciers > 1 km^{2} (0.386 sq mi or 247 acres) and river estuaries.

Saint-Seurin-de-Prats (French pronunciation: [sɛ̃ søʁɛ̃ də pʁa]; Languedocien: Sent Sieurin de Prats) is a commune in the Dordogne department in Nouvelle-Aquitaine in southwestern France.

== Population ==
Historical population
Year	Pop.	±% p.a.
1968	461	—
1975	451	−0.31%
1982	476	+0.77%
1990	491	+0.39%
1999	488	−0.07%
2007	505	+0.43%
2012	476	−1.18%
2017	494	+0.75%
2023	461	−1.15%
Source: INSEE

== See also ==
- Communes of the Dordogne department
