= Carsac-de-Gurson =

- Commune
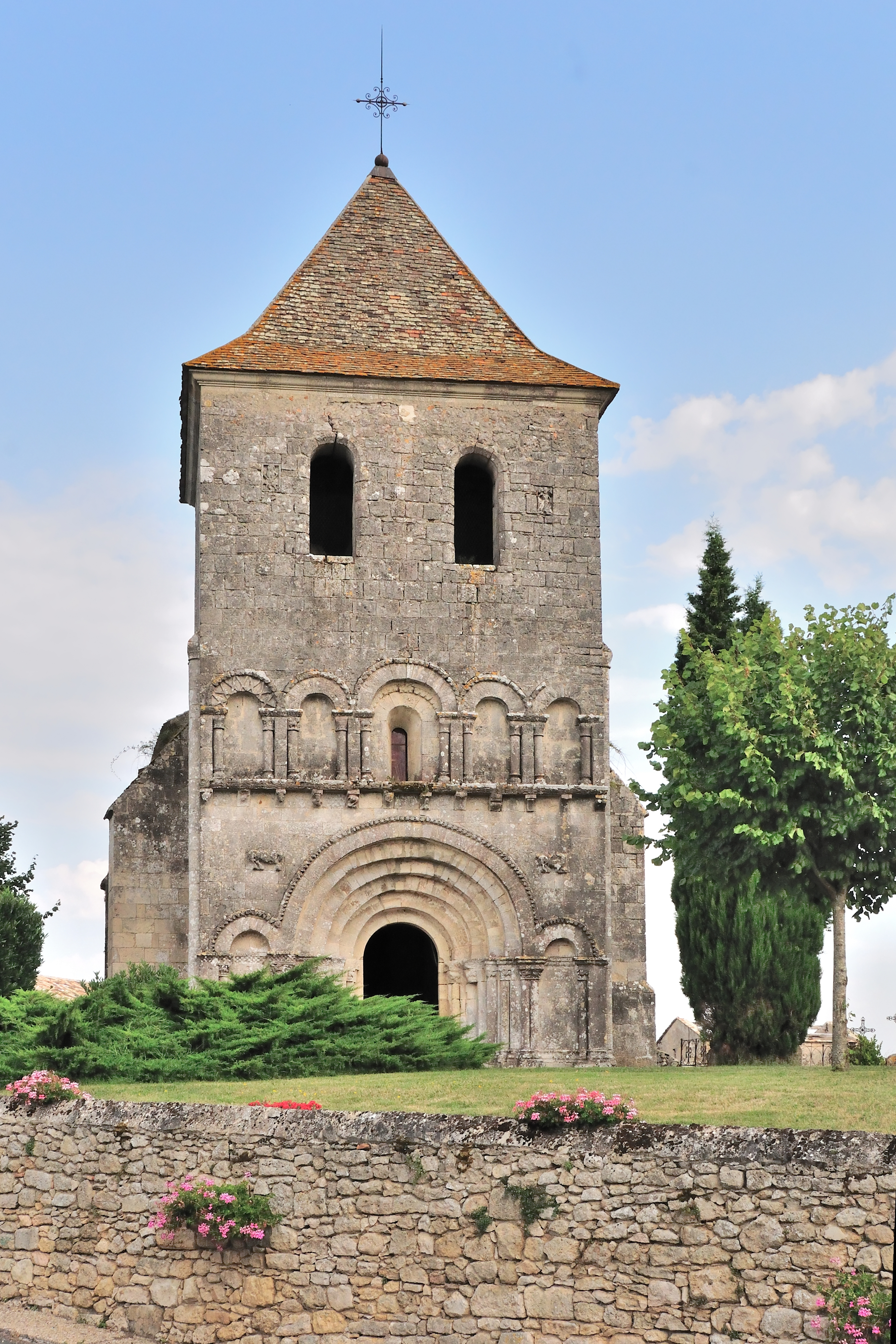
- The church in Carsac-de-Gurson

- Coat of arms
- Location of Carsac-de-Gurson
- Location within France Location within Nouvelle-Aquitaine
- Coordinates: 44°56′52″N 0°05′28″E
- Country: France
- Region: Nouvelle-Aquitaine
- Department: Dordogne
- Arrondissement: Bergerac
- Canton: Pays de Montaigne et Gurson

Government
  - Mayor (2020–2026): Jean-Pierre Mahieu
- Area^{1}: 6.91 km^{2} (2.67 sq mi)
- Elevation: 104 m (341 ft)
- Highest elevation: 116 m (381 ft)
- Lowest elevation: 27 m (89 ft)
- Population (2023): 231
  - Density: 33.4/km^{2} (86.6/sq mi)
- Time zone: UTC+01:00 (CET)
  - Summer (DST): UTC+02:00 (CEST)
- INSEE/Postal code: 24083 /24610
- ^{1} French Land Register data, which excludes lakes, ponds, glaciers > 1 km^{2} (0.386 sq mi or 247 acres) and river estuaries.

Carsac-de-Gurson (French pronunciation: [kaʁsak də ɡyʁsɔ̃]; Occitan: Carsac de Gurçon) is a commune in the Dordogne department in Nouvelle-Aquitaine in southwestern France.

== Population ==
Historical population
Year	Pop.	±% p.a.
1968	238	—
1975	218	−1.25%
1982	209	−0.60%
1990	175	−2.19%
1999	189	+0.86%
2007	193	+0.26%
2012	195	+0.21%
2017	190	−0.52%
2023	231	+3.31%
Source: INSEE

== See also ==
- Communes of the Dordogne department
