= Saint-Antoine-de-Breuilh station =

Railway station in Saint-Antoine-de-Breuilh, France

Coordinates: 44°50′47″N 0°09′07″E

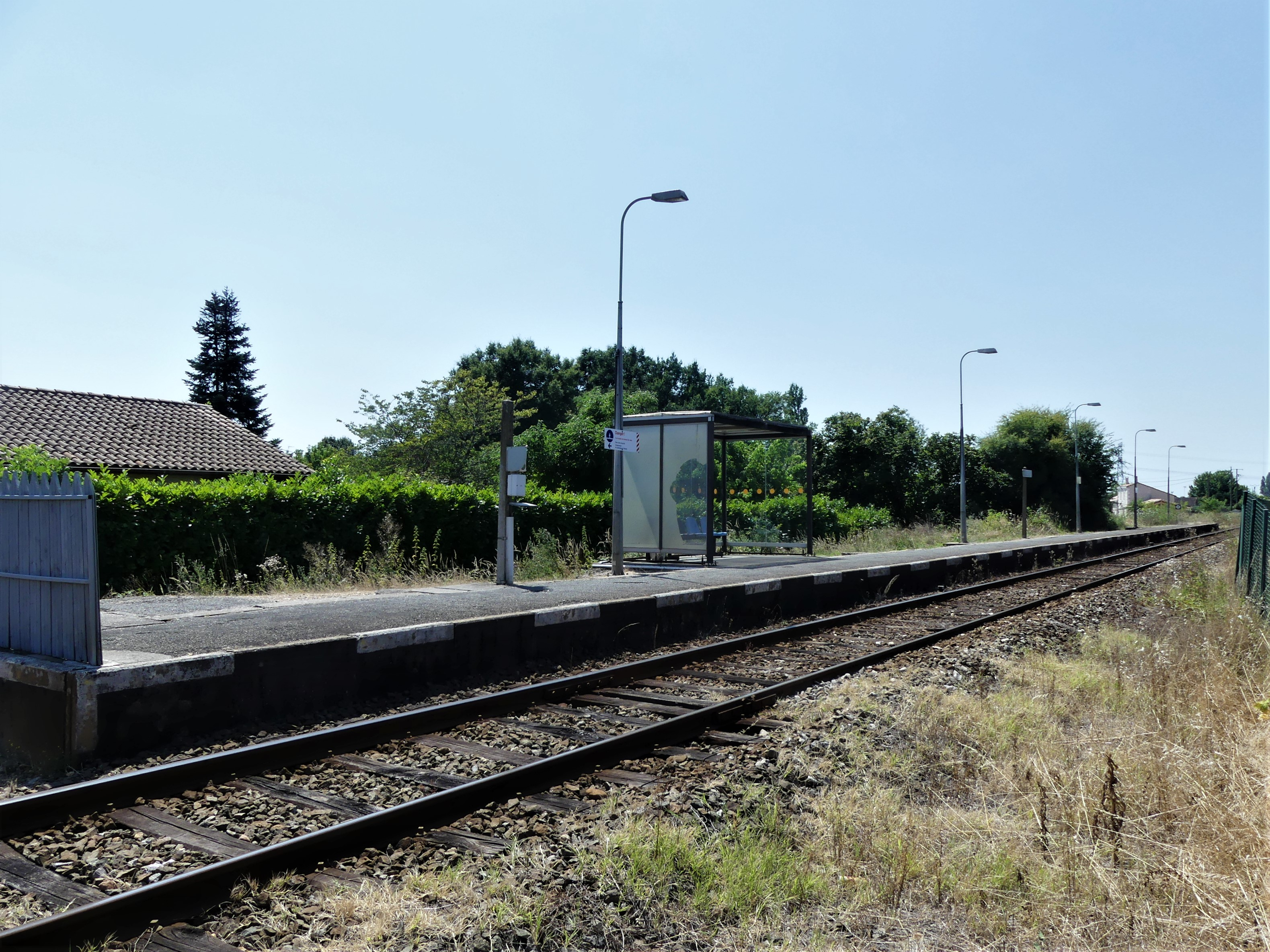
Railway stop in Saint-Antoine-de-Breuilh, Dordogne, France

Saint-Antoine-de-Breuilh is a railway station in Saint-Antoine-de-Breuilh, Nouvelle-Aquitaine, France. The station is located on the Libourne - Le Buisson railway line. The station is served by TER (local) services operated by SNCF.

== Train services ==
The following services currently call at Saint-Antoine-de-Breuilh:

- local service (TER Nouvelle-Aquitaine) Bordeaux - Libourne - Bergerac - Sarlat-la-Canéda

Preceding station	TER Nouvelle-Aquitaine	Following station
Vélines towards Bordeaux	33	Sainte-Foy-la-Grande towards Sarlat-la-Canéda
