= Saint-Vivien, Dordogne =

Saint-Vivien
- Commune
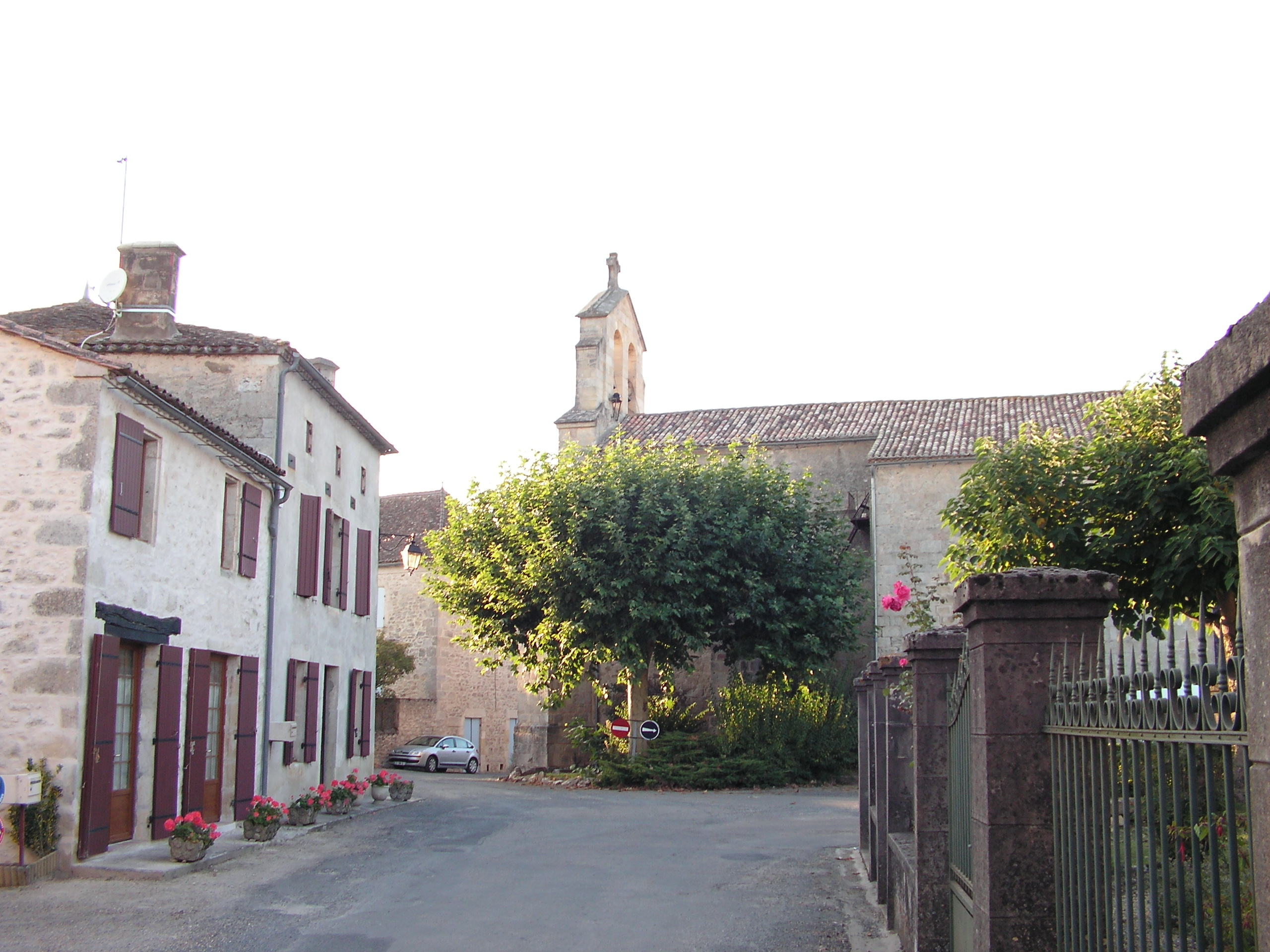
- The church and surroundings in Saint-Vivien
- Location of Saint-Vivien
- Location within France Location within Nouvelle-Aquitaine
- Coordinates: 44°53′36″N 0°06′20″E
- Country: France
- Region: Nouvelle-Aquitaine
- Department: Dordogne
- Arrondissement: Bergerac
- Canton: Pays de Montaigne et Gurson

Government
  - Mayor (2020–2026): Didier Fourcaud
- Area^{1}: 8.53 km^{2} (3.29 sq mi)
- Elevation: 92 m (302 ft)
- Highest elevation: 101 m (331 ft)
- Lowest elevation: 23 m (75 ft)
- Population (2023): 240
  - Density: 28/km^{2} (73/sq mi)
- Time zone: UTC+01:00 (CET)
  - Summer (DST): UTC+02:00 (CEST)
- INSEE/Postal code: 24514 /24230
- ^{1} French Land Register data, which excludes lakes, ponds, glaciers > 1 km^{2} (0.386 sq mi or 247 acres) and river estuaries.

Saint-Vivien (French pronunciation: [sɛ̃ vivjɛ̃]; Occitan: Sent Bebian) is a commune in the Dordogne department in Nouvelle-Aquitaine in southwestern France.

== Population ==
Historical population
Year	Pop.	±% p.a.
1968	274	—
1975	247	−1.47%
1982	250	+0.17%
1990	242	−0.41%
1999	241	−0.05%
2007	287	+2.21%
2012	282	−0.35%
2017	250	−2.38%
2023	240	−0.68%
Source: INSEE

== See also ==
- Communes of the Dordogne department
