= Canton of Pays de Montaigne et Gurson =

Canton of France

Coordinates: 44.85°N 0.21°E

The canton of Pays de Montaigne et Gurson is an administrative division of the Dordogne department, southwestern France. It was created at the French canton reorganisation which came into effect in March 2015. Its seat is in Port-Sainte-Foy-et-Ponchapt.

It consists of the following communes:

1. Bonneville-et-Saint-Avit-de-Fumadières
2. Carsac-de-Gurson
3. Fougueyrolles
4. Lamothe-Montravel
5. Minzac
6. Montazeau
7. Montcaret
8. Montpeyroux
9. Nastringues
10. Port-Sainte-Foy-et-Ponchapt
11. Saint-Antoine-de-Breuilh
12. Saint-Géraud-de-Corps
13. Saint-Martin-de-Gurson
14. Saint-Méard-de-Gurçon
15. Saint-Michel-de-Montaigne
16. Saint-Rémy
17. Saint-Seurin-de-Prats
18. Saint-Vivien
19. Vélines
20. Villefranche-de-Lonchat
