= Montcaret =

- Commune
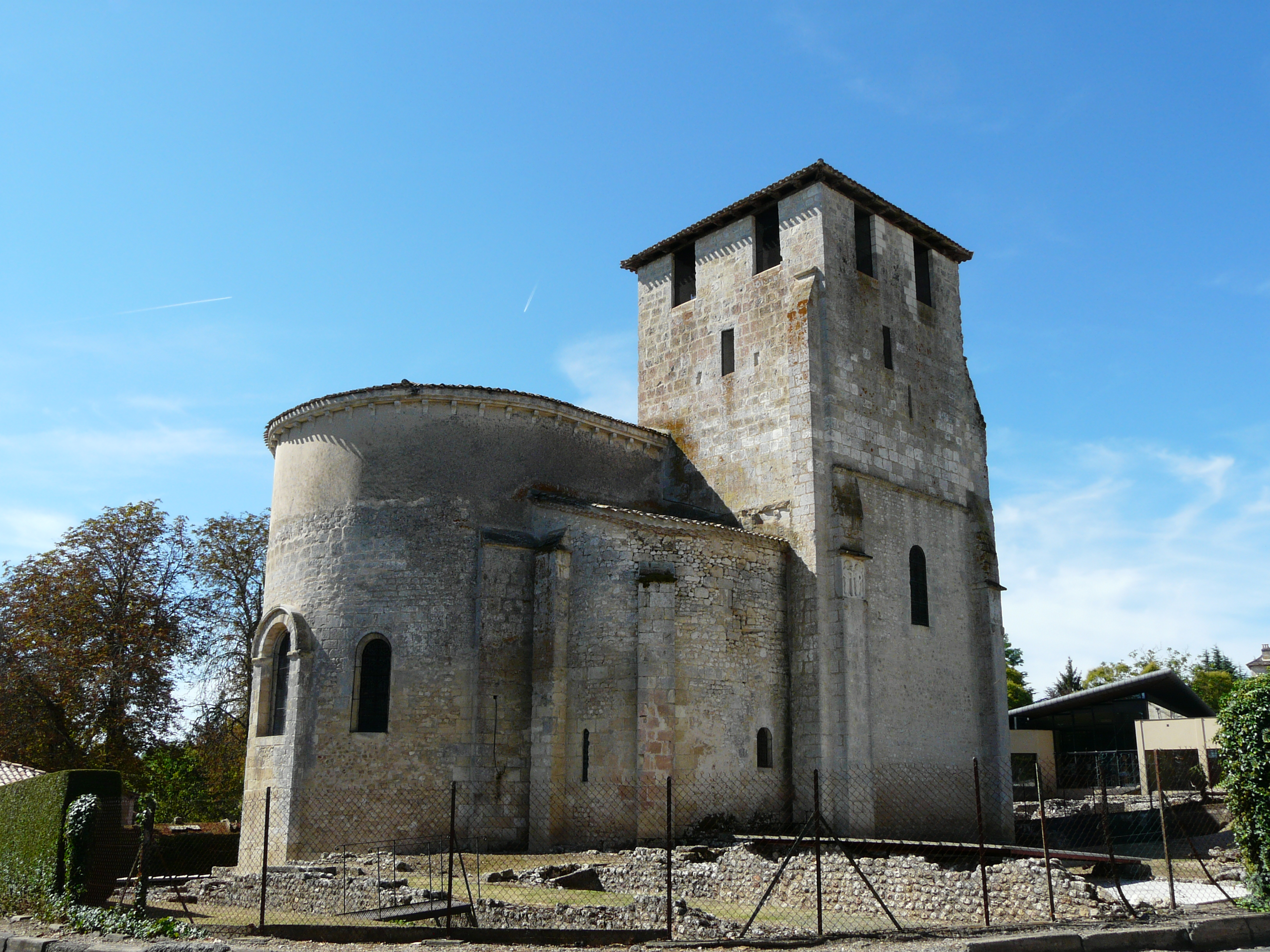
- The church in Montcaret
- Location of Montcaret
- Location within France Location within Nouvelle-Aquitaine
- Coordinates: 44°51′34″N 0°03′52″E
- Country: France
- Region: Nouvelle-Aquitaine
- Department: Dordogne
- Arrondissement: Bergerac
- Canton: Pays de Montaigne et Gurson
- Intercommunality: Montaigne Montravel et Gurson

Government
  - Mayor (2020–2026): Jean-Thierry Lansade
- Area^{1}: 17.07 km^{2} (6.59 sq mi)
- Elevation: 100 m (330 ft)
- Highest elevation: 108 m (354 ft)
- Lowest elevation: 8 m (26 ft)
- Population (2023): 1,390
  - Density: 81.4/km^{2} (211/sq mi)
- Time zone: UTC+01:00 (CET)
  - Summer (DST): UTC+02:00 (CEST)
- INSEE/Postal code: 24289 /24230
- ^{1} French Land Register data, which excludes lakes, ponds, glaciers > 1 km^{2} (0.386 sq mi or 247 acres) and river estuaries.

Montcaret (French pronunciation: [mɔ̃kaʁɛ]) is a commune in the Dordogne department in Nouvelle-Aquitaine in southwestern France.

== Population ==
Historical population
Year	Pop.	±% p.a.
1968	1,045	—
1975	1,037	−0.11%
1982	1,071	+0.46%
1990	1,099	+0.32%
1999	1,219	+1.16%
2007	1,354	+1.32%
2012	1,433	+1.14%
2017	1,455	+0.31%
2023	1,390	−0.76%
Source: INSEE

== See also ==
- Communes of the Dordogne department
