= Vélines =

- Commune
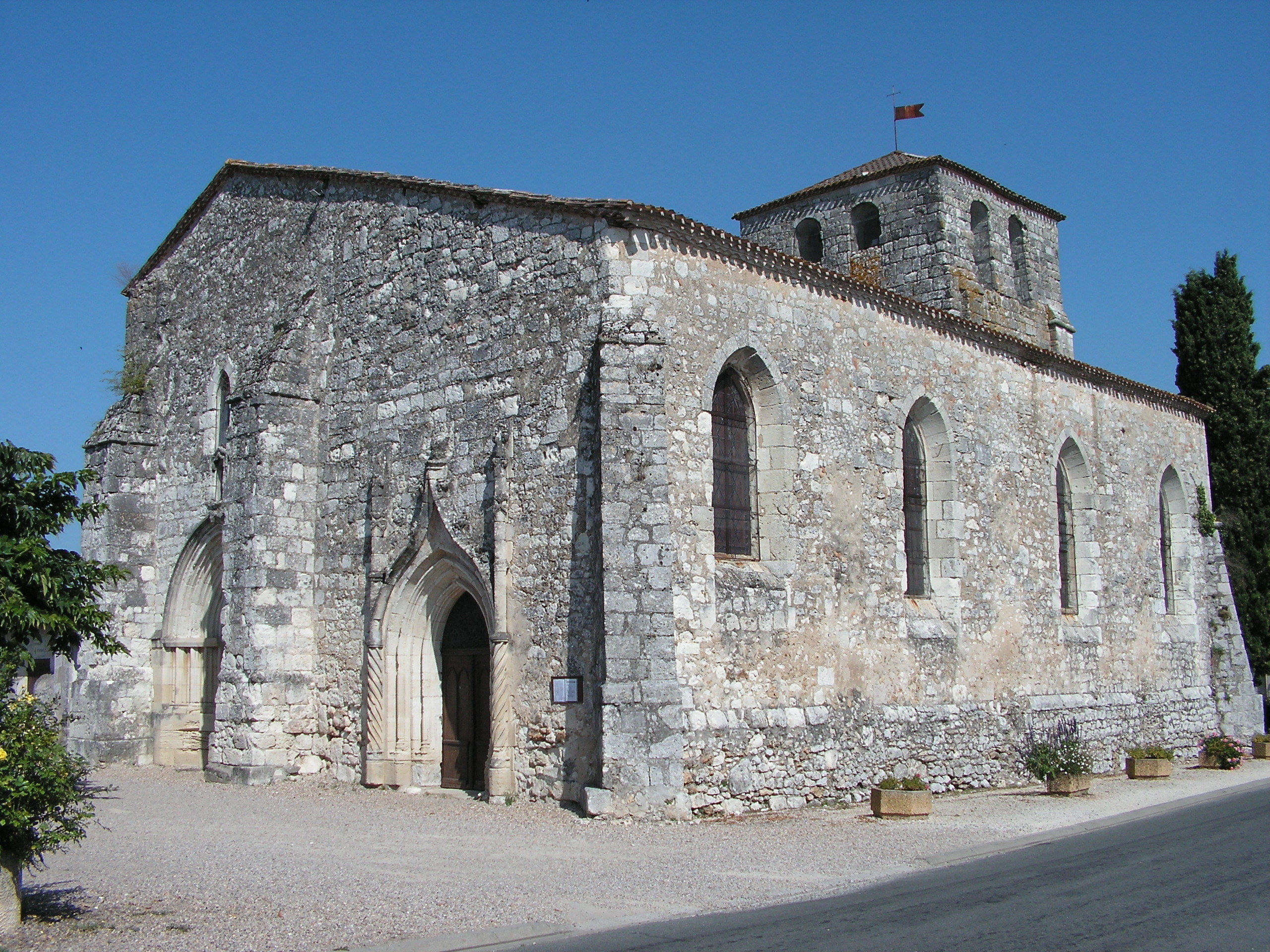
- The church in Vélines

- Coat of arms
- Location of Vélines
- Location within France Location within Nouvelle-Aquitaine
- Coordinates: 44°51′35″N 0°06′33″E
- Country: France
- Region: Nouvelle-Aquitaine
- Department: Dordogne
- Arrondissement: Bergerac
- Canton: Pays de Montaigne et Gurson

Government
  - Mayor (2020–2026): Gilbert de Miras
- Area^{1}: 10.47 km^{2} (4.04 sq mi)
- Elevation: 72 m (236 ft)
- Highest elevation: 113 m (371 ft)
- Lowest elevation: 10 m (33 ft)
- Population (2023): 1,104
  - Density: 105.4/km^{2} (273.1/sq mi)
- Time zone: UTC+01:00 (CET)
  - Summer (DST): UTC+02:00 (CEST)
- INSEE/Postal code: 24568 /24230
- ^{1} French Land Register data, which excludes lakes, ponds, glaciers > 1 km^{2} (0.386 sq mi or 247 acres) and river estuaries.

Vélines (French pronunciation: [velin]; Occitan: Velinas) is a commune in the Dordogne department in Nouvelle-Aquitaine in southwestern France. Vélines station has rail connections to Bordeaux, Bergerac and Sarlat-la-Canéda.

== Population ==
Historical population
Year	Pop.	±% p.a.
1968	937	—
1975	929	−0.12%
1982	918	−0.17%
1990	1,068	+1.91%
1999	1,093	+0.26%
2007	1,154	+0.68%
2012	1,099	−0.97%
2017	1,102	+0.05%
2023	1,104	+0.03%
Source: INSEE

== See also ==
- Communes of the Dordogne department
