= Villefranche-de-Lonchat =

- Commune
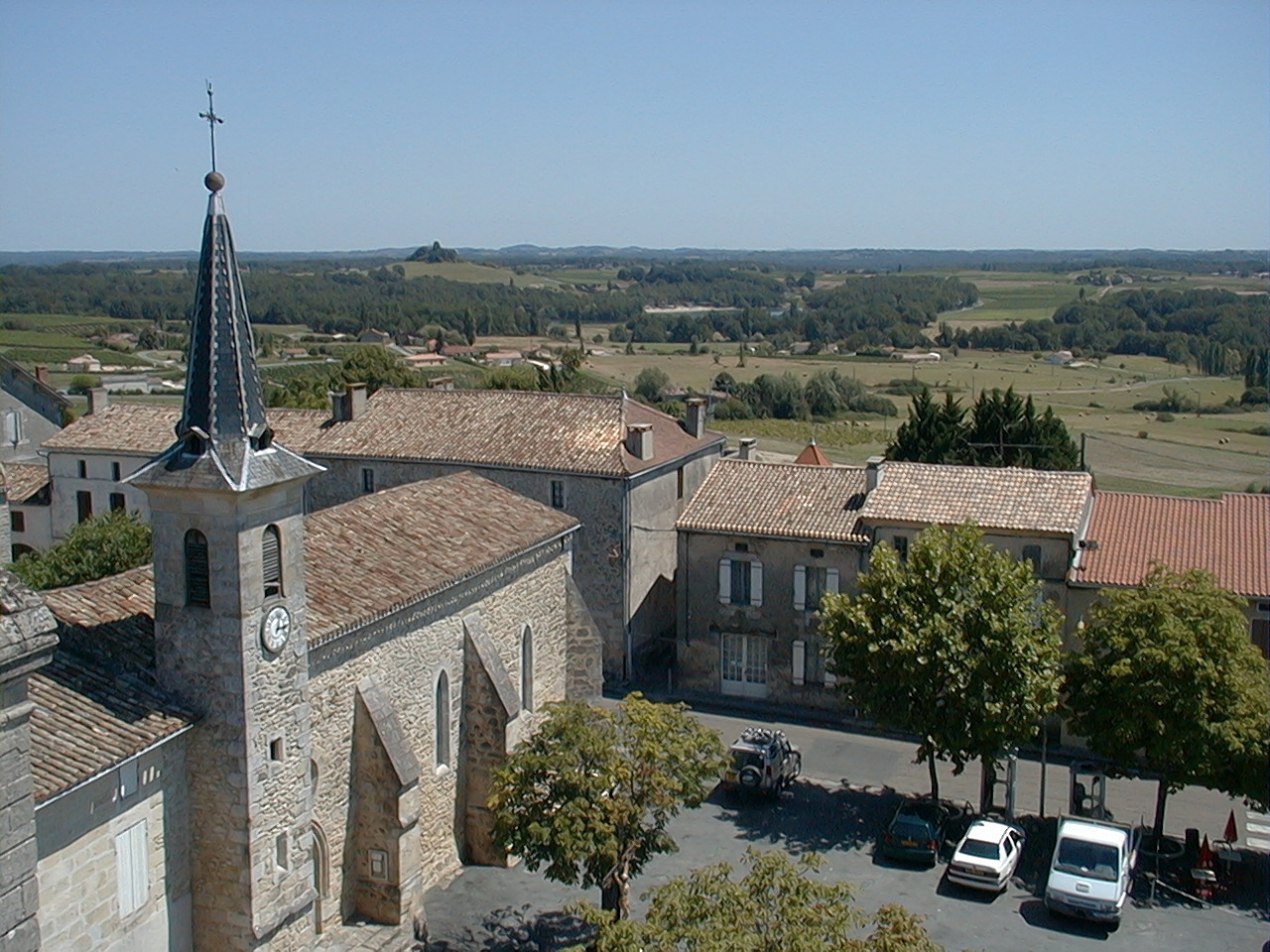
- The chapel in Villefranche-de-Lonchat

- Coat of arms
- Location of Villefranche-de-Lonchat
- Location within France Location within Nouvelle-Aquitaine
- Coordinates: 44°56′57″N 0°03′29″E
- Country: France
- Region: Nouvelle-Aquitaine
- Department: Dordogne
- Arrondissement: Bergerac
- Canton: Pays de Montaigne et Gurson

Government
  - Mayor (2020–2026): Gilles Taverson
- Area^{1}: 14.98 km^{2} (5.78 sq mi)
- Elevation: 90 m (300 ft)
- Highest elevation: 105 m (344 ft)
- Lowest elevation: 27 m (89 ft)
- Population (2023): 998
  - Density: 66.6/km^{2} (173/sq mi)
- Time zone: UTC+01:00 (CET)
  - Summer (DST): UTC+02:00 (CEST)
- INSEE/Postal code: 24584 /24610
- ^{1} French Land Register data, which excludes lakes, ponds, glaciers > 1 km^{2} (0.386 sq mi or 247 acres) and river estuaries.

Villefranche-de-Lonchat (French pronunciation: [vilfʁɑ̃ʃ də lɔ̃ʃa]; Occitan: Vilafrancha de Lopchac) is a commune in the Dordogne department in Nouvelle-Aquitaine in southwestern France.

== Population ==
Historical population
Year	Pop.	±% p.a.
1968	814	—
1975	740	−1.35%
1982	801	+1.14%
1990	735	−1.07%
1999	786	+0.75%
2007	866	+1.22%
2012	968	+2.25%
2017	973	+0.10%
2023	998	+0.42%
Source: INSEE

== See also ==
- Communes of the Dordogne department
