= Saint-Méard-de-Gurçon =

- Commune
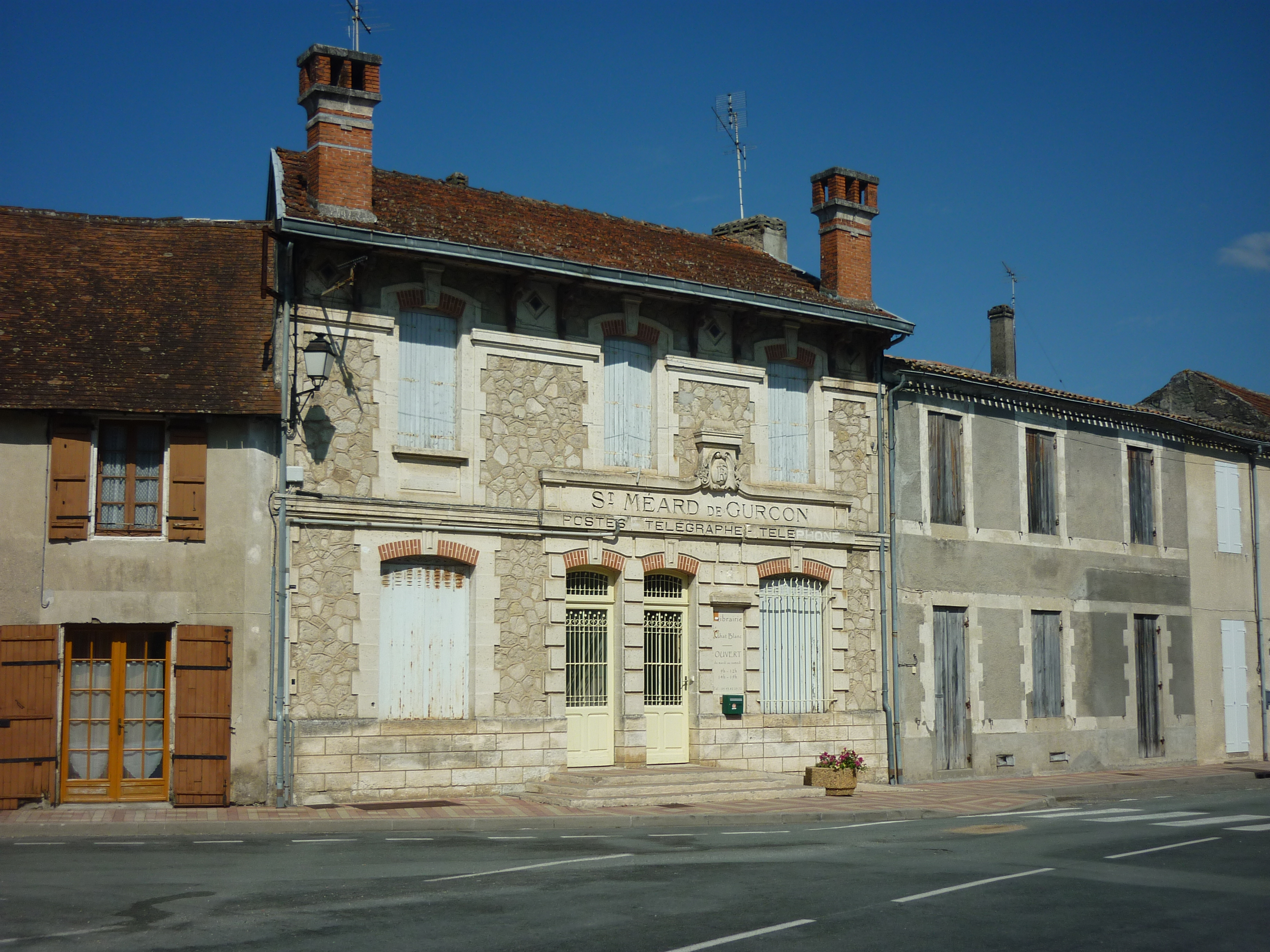
- Post office

- Coat of arms
- Location of Saint-Méard-de-Gurçon
- Location within France Location within Nouvelle-Aquitaine
- Coordinates: 44°54′36″N 0°11′04″E
- Country: France
- Region: Nouvelle-Aquitaine
- Department: Dordogne
- Arrondissement: Bergerac
- Canton: Pays de Montaigne et Gurson

Government
  - Mayor (2020–2026): Cyril Barde
- Area^{1}: 28.38 km^{2} (10.96 sq mi)
- Elevation: 70 m (230 ft)
- Highest elevation: 116 m (381 ft)
- Lowest elevation: 28 m (92 ft)
- Population (2023): 809
  - Density: 28.5/km^{2} (73.8/sq mi)
- Time zone: UTC+01:00 (CET)
  - Summer (DST): UTC+02:00 (CEST)
- INSEE/Postal code: 24461 /24610
- ^{1} French Land Register data, which excludes lakes, ponds, glaciers > 1 km^{2} (0.386 sq mi or 247 acres) and river estuaries.

Saint-Méard-de-Gurçon (French pronunciation: [sɛ̃ meaʁ də ɡyʁsɔ̃]; Occitan: Sent Meard de Gurçon or Sent Miard de Gurçon) is a commune in the Dordogne department in Nouvelle-Aquitaine in southwestern France.

== Population ==
Historical population
| Year | Pop. | ±% p.a. |
|---|---|---|
| 1968 | 846 | — |
| 1975 | 763 | −1.46% |
| 1982 | 776 | +0.24% |
| 1990 | 751 | −0.41% |
| 1999 | 795 | +0.63% |
| 2007 | 811 | +0.25% |
| 2012 | 773 | −0.96% |
| 2017 | 813 | +1.01% |
| 2023 | 809 | −0.08% |
Source: INSEE

== See also ==
- Communes of the Dordogne department
