= Vélines station =

Railway station in Vélines, France

Coordinates: 44°51′07″N 0°06′12″E

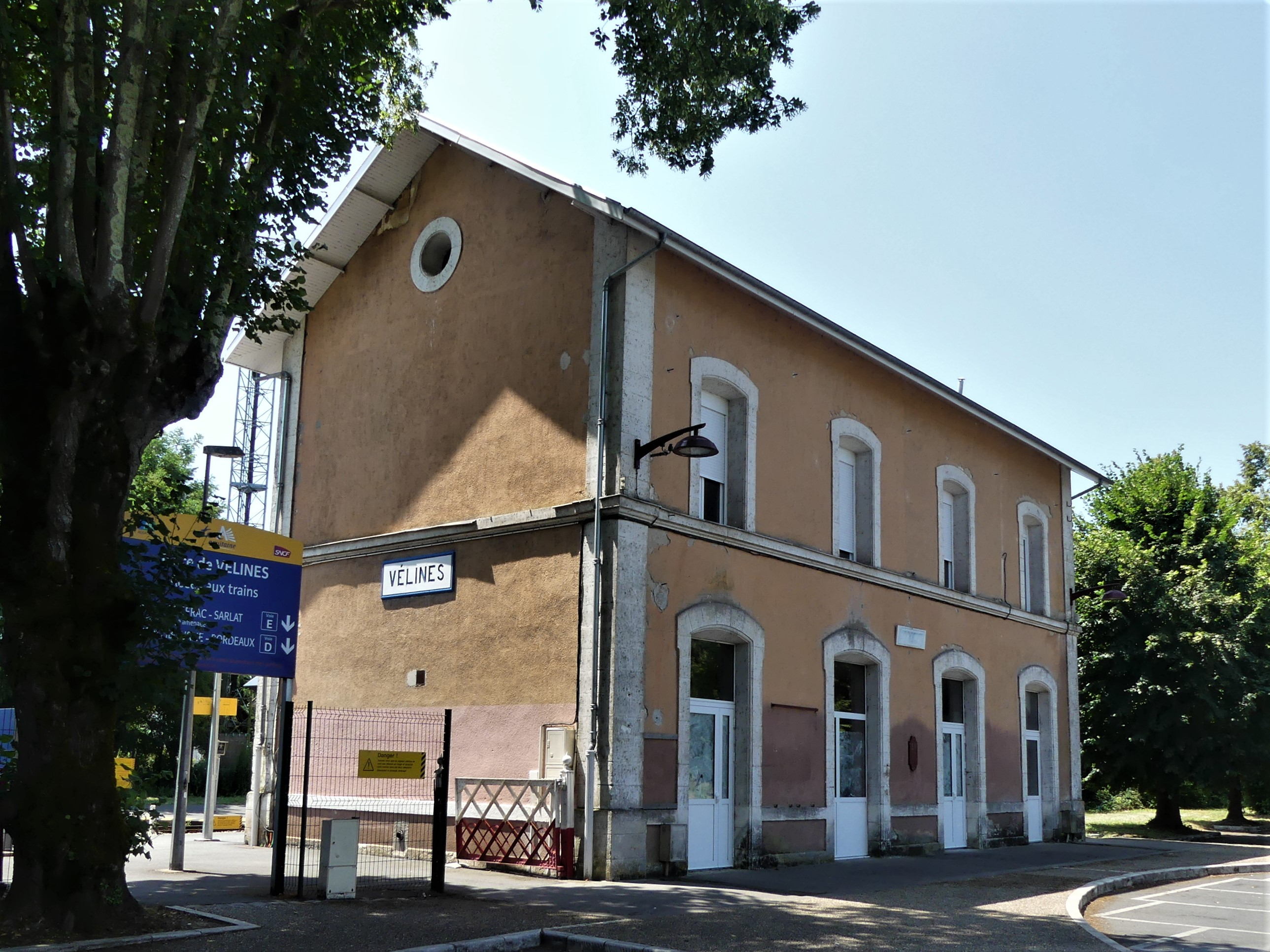
The station in 2018

Vélines is a railway station in Vélines, Nouvelle-Aquitaine, France. The station is located on the Libourne - Le Buisson railway line. The station is served by TER (local) services operated by SNCF.

== Train services ==
The following services currently call at Vélines:

- local service (TER Nouvelle-Aquitaine) Bordeaux - Libourne - Bergerac - Sarlat-la-Canéda

Preceding station	TER Nouvelle-Aquitaine	Following station
Lamothe-Montravel towards Bordeaux	33	Saint-Antoine-de-Breuilh towards Sarlat-la-Canéda
