= Fougueyrolles =

- Commune
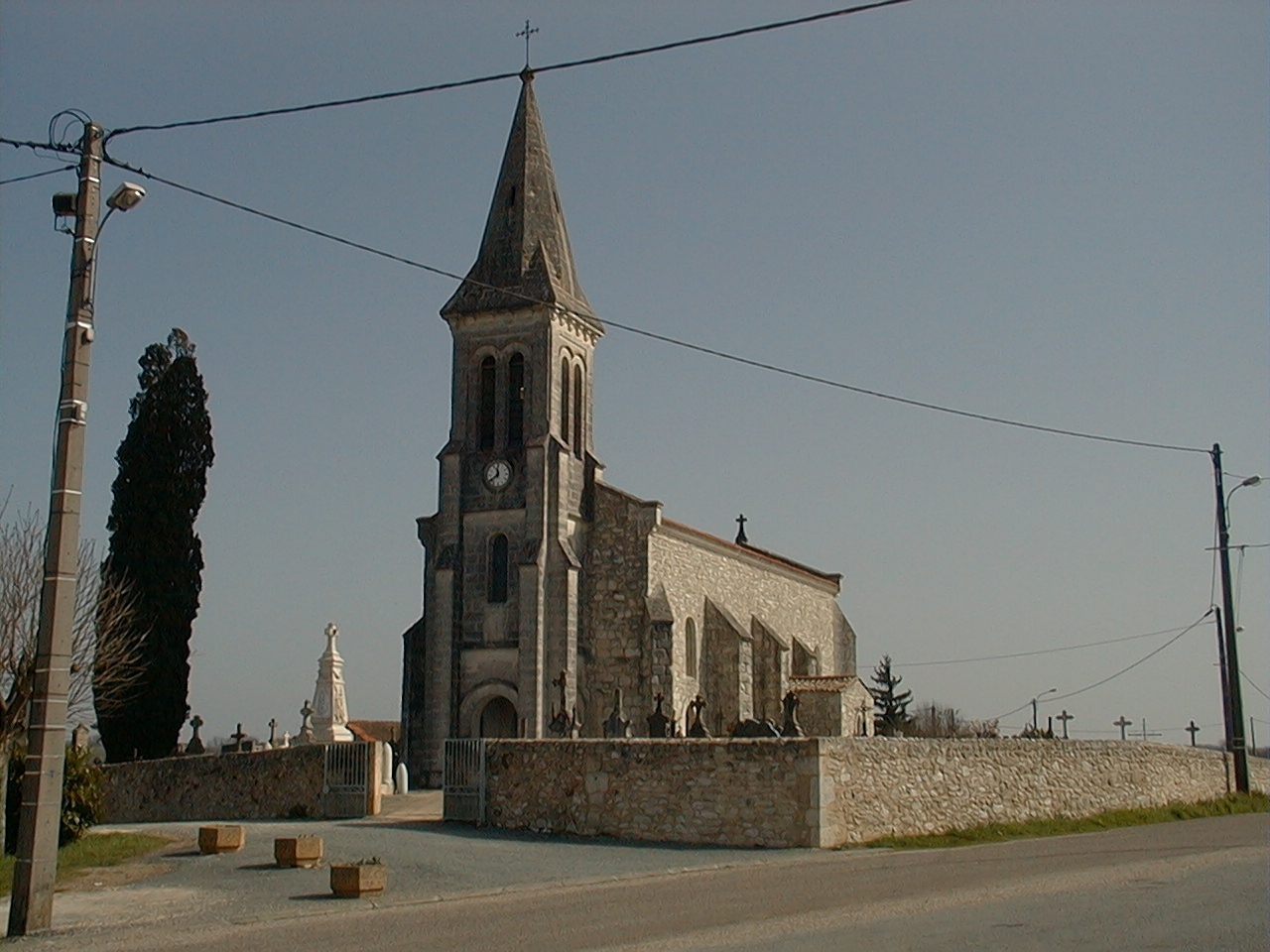
- The church in Fougueyrolles

- Coat of arms
- Location of Fougueyrolles
- Location within France Location within Nouvelle-Aquitaine
- Coordinates: 44°51′59″N 0°11′18″E
- Country: France
- Region: Nouvelle-Aquitaine
- Department: Dordogne
- Arrondissement: Bergerac
- Canton: Pays de Montaigne et Gurson
- Intercommunality: Montaigne Montravel et Gurson

Government
  - Mayor (2020–2026): Ghislain Pantarotto
- Area^{1}: 11.45 km^{2} (4.42 sq mi)
- Elevation: 103 m (338 ft)
- Highest elevation: 152 m (499 ft)
- Lowest elevation: 33 m (108 ft)
- Population (2023): 462
  - Density: 40.3/km^{2} (105/sq mi)
- Time zone: UTC+01:00 (CET)
  - Summer (DST): UTC+02:00 (CEST)
- INSEE/Postal code: 24189 /33220
- ^{1} French Land Register data, which excludes lakes, ponds, glaciers > 1 km^{2} (0.386 sq mi or 247 acres) and river estuaries.

Fougueyrolles (French pronunciation: [fuɡeʁɔl]; Occitan: Faugairòlas) is a commune in the Dordogne department in Nouvelle-Aquitaine in southwestern France.

== Population ==
Historical population
Year	Pop.	±% p.a.
1968	477	—
1975	385	−3.01%
1982	375	−0.38%
1990	383	+0.26%
1999	431	+1.32%
2007	466	+0.98%
2012	479	+0.55%
2017	479	+0.00%
2023	462	−0.60%
Source: INSEE

== See also ==
- Communes of the Dordogne department
