= Bonneville-et-Saint-Avit-de-Fumadières =

- Commune
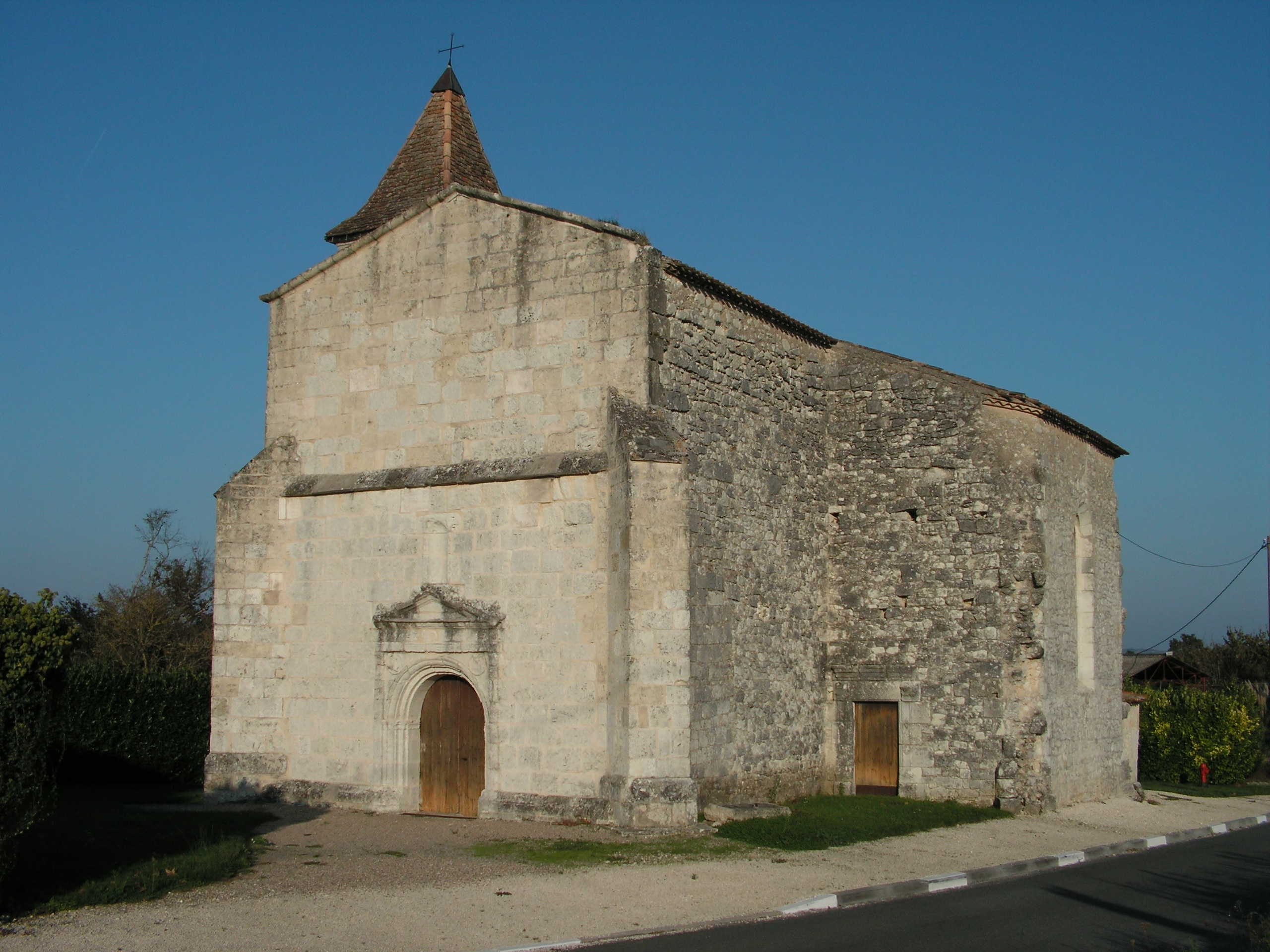
- The church in Bonneville
- Location of Bonneville-et-Saint-Avit-de-Fumadières
- Location within France Location within Nouvelle-Aquitaine
- Coordinates: 44°53′23″N 0°05′02″E
- Country: France
- Region: Nouvelle-Aquitaine
- Department: Dordogne
- Arrondissement: Bergerac
- Canton: Pays de Montaigne et Gurson

Government
  - Mayor (2020–2026): Serge Fourcaud
- Area^{1}: 7.04 km^{2} (2.72 sq mi)
- Elevation: 90 m (300 ft)
- Highest elevation: 108 m (354 ft)
- Lowest elevation: 18 m (59 ft)
- Population (2023): 299
  - Density: 42.5/km^{2} (110/sq mi)
- Time zone: UTC+01:00 (CET)
  - Summer (DST): UTC+02:00 (CEST)
- INSEE/Postal code: 24048 /24230
- ^{1} French Land Register data, which excludes lakes, ponds, glaciers > 1 km^{2} (0.386 sq mi or 247 acres) and river estuaries.

Bonneville-et-Saint-Avit-de-Fumadières (French pronunciation: [bɔnvil e sɛ̃.t‿avi də fymadjɛʁ]; Occitan: Bonavila e Sent Avit de Fumadièras) is a commune in the Dordogne department in southwestern France.

== Population ==
Historical population
Year	Pop.	±% p.a.
1968	220	—
1975	195	−1.71%
1982	214	+1.34%
1990	216	+0.12%
1999	214	−0.10%
2007	301	+4.36%
2012	295	−0.40%
2017	323	+1.83%
2023	299	−1.28%
Source: INSEE

== See also ==
- Communes of the Dordogne département
