= Saint-Martin-de-Gurson =

- Commune
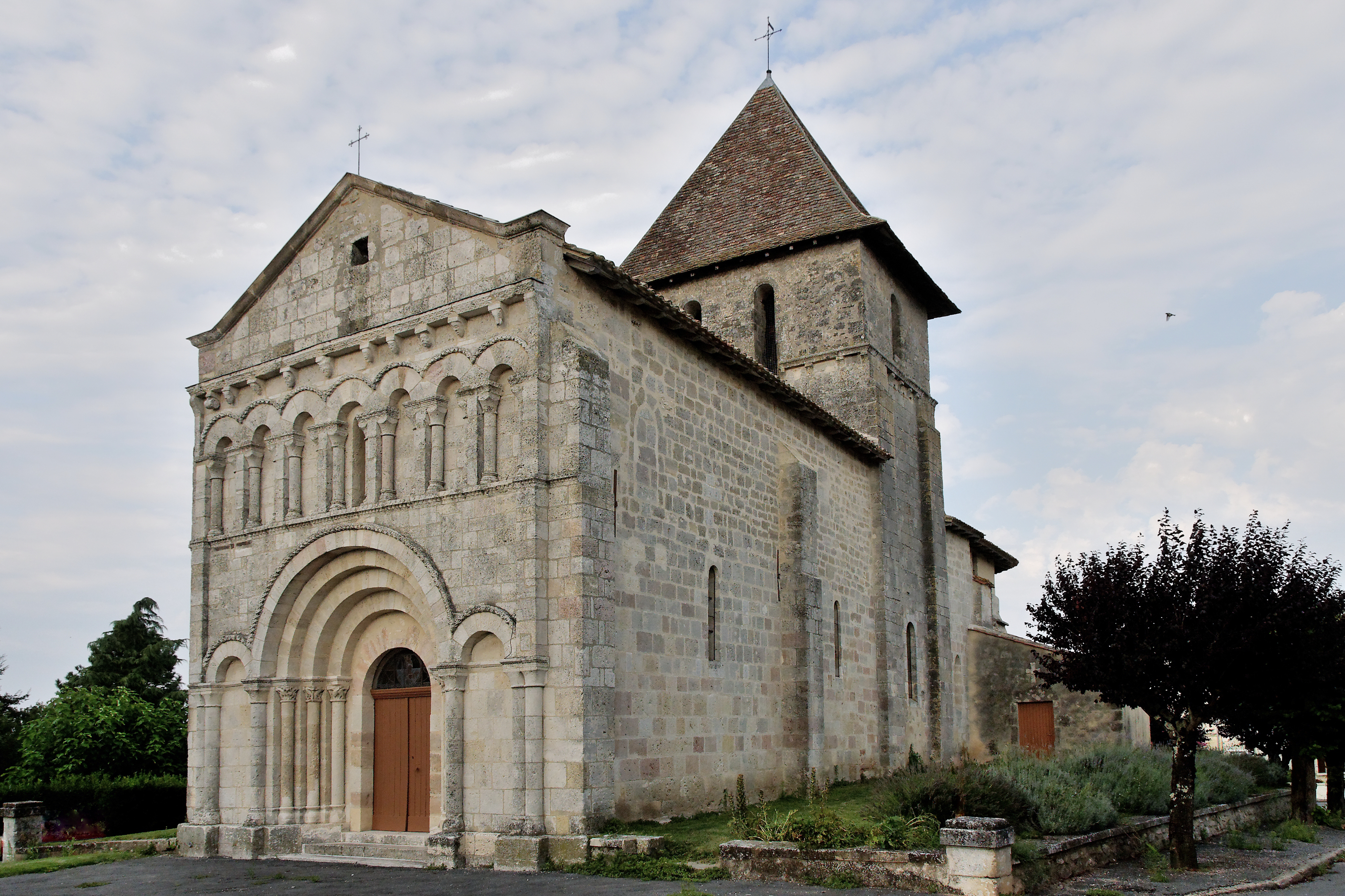
- The church in Saint-Martin-de-Gurson

- Coat of arms
- Location of Saint-Martin-de-Gurson
- Location within France Location within Nouvelle-Aquitaine
- Coordinates: 44°57′12″N 0°06′28″E
- Country: France
- Region: Nouvelle-Aquitaine
- Department: Dordogne
- Arrondissement: Bergerac
- Canton: Pays de Montaigne et Gurson

Government
  - Mayor (2020–2026): Marc Grandy
- Area^{1}: 24.58 km^{2} (9.49 sq mi)
- Elevation: 85 m (279 ft)
- Highest elevation: 106 m (348 ft)
- Lowest elevation: 31 m (102 ft)
- Population (2023): 653
  - Density: 26.6/km^{2} (68.8/sq mi)
- Time zone: UTC+01:00 (CET)
  - Summer (DST): UTC+02:00 (CEST)
- INSEE/Postal code: 24454 /24610
- ^{1} French Land Register data, which excludes lakes, ponds, glaciers > 1 km^{2} (0.386 sq mi or 247 acres) and river estuaries.

Saint-Martin-de-Gurson (French pronunciation: [sɛ̃ maʁtɛ̃ də ɡyʁsɔ̃]; Occitan: Sent Martin de Gurçon, before 1992: Saint-Martin-de-Gurçon) is a commune in the Dordogne department in Nouvelle-Aquitaine in southwestern France.

== Population ==
Historical population
Year	Pop.	±% p.a.
1968	537	—
1975	480	−1.59%
1982	526	+1.32%
1990	559	+0.76%
1999	555	−0.08%
2007	571	+0.36%
2012	625	+1.82%
2017	666	+1.28%
2023	653	−0.33%
Source: INSEE

== See also ==
- Communes of the Dordogne department
