= Minzac =

- Commune
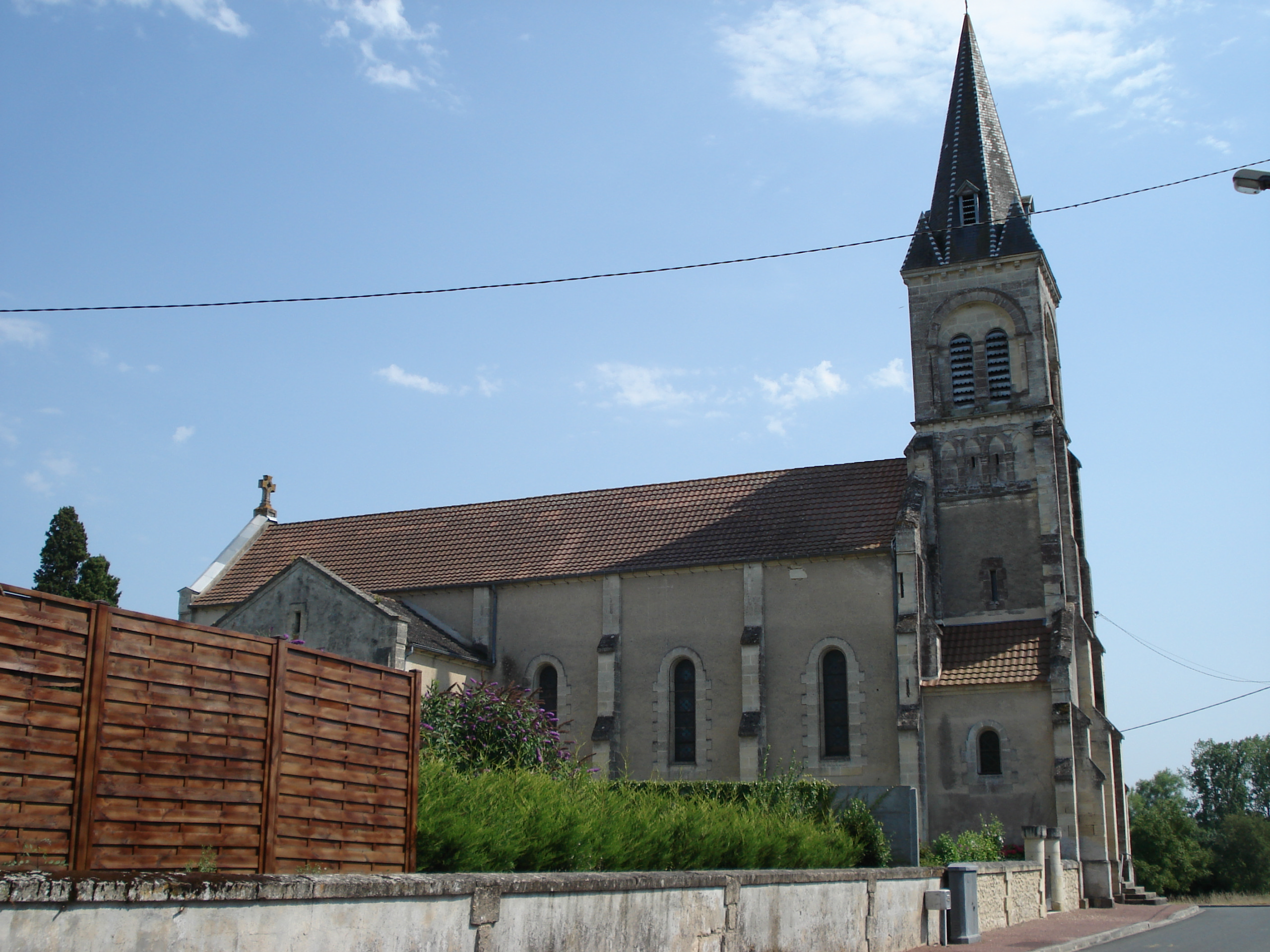
- The church in Minzac

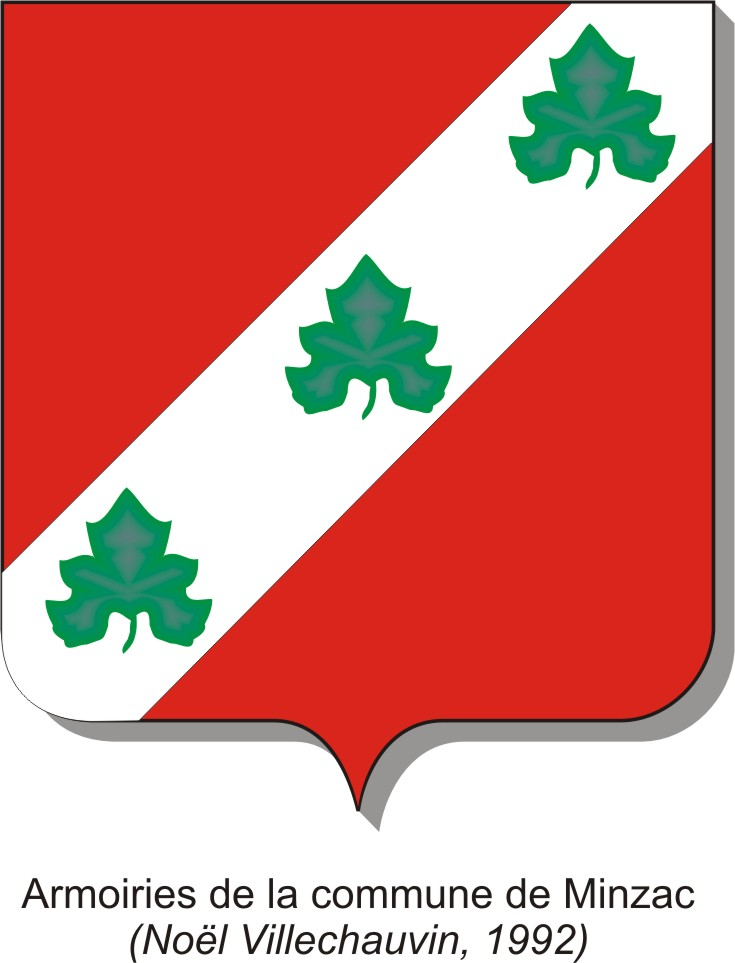
- Coat of arms
- Location of Minzac
- Location within France Location within Nouvelle-Aquitaine
- Coordinates: 44°58′24″N 0°02′17″E
- Country: France
- Region: Nouvelle-Aquitaine
- Department: Dordogne
- Arrondissement: Bergerac
- Canton: Pays de Montaigne et Gurson

Government
  - Mayor (2020–2026): Marcel Lesbegueries
- Area^{1}: 15.91 km^{2} (6.14 sq mi)
- Elevation: 65 m (213 ft)
- Highest elevation: 96 m (315 ft)
- Lowest elevation: 26 m (85 ft)
- Population (2023): 495
  - Density: 31.1/km^{2} (80.6/sq mi)
- Time zone: UTC+01:00 (CET)
  - Summer (DST): UTC+02:00 (CEST)
- INSEE/Postal code: 24272 /24610
- ^{1} French Land Register data, which excludes lakes, ponds, glaciers > 1 km^{2} (0.386 sq mi or 247 acres) and river estuaries.

Minzac (French pronunciation: [mɛ̃zak]) is a commune in the Dordogne department in Nouvelle-Aquitaine in southwestern France.

== Population ==
Historical population
Year	Pop.	±% p.a.
1968	440	—
1975	365	−2.63%
1982	318	−1.95%
1990	303	−0.60%
1999	347	+1.52%
2007	422	+2.48%
2012	444	+1.02%
2017	458	+0.62%
2023	495	+1.30%
Source: INSEE

== See also ==
- Communes of the Dordogne department
