= Saint-Géraud-de-Corps =

- Commune
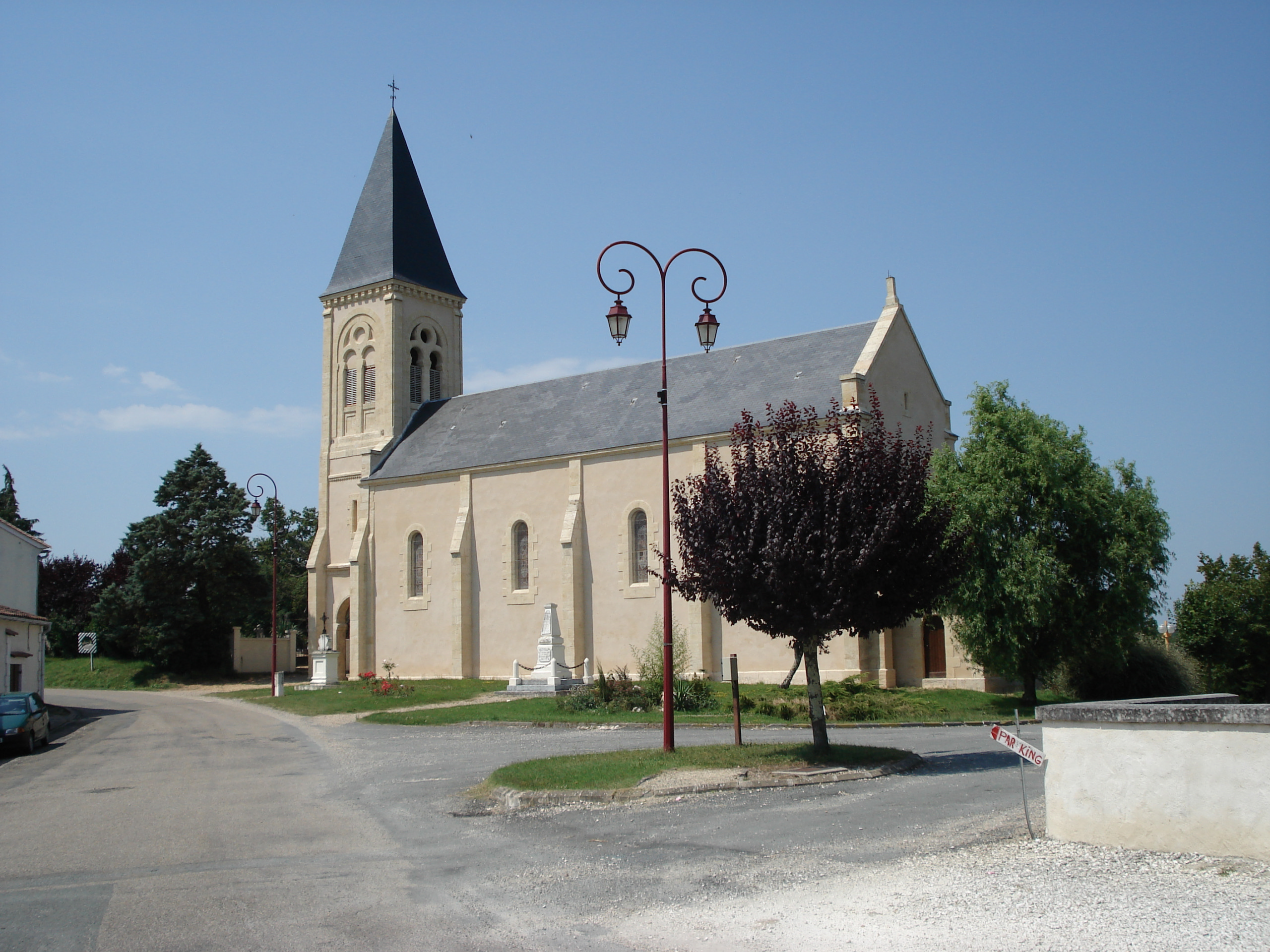
- The church in Saint-Géraud-de-Corps

- Coat of arms
- Location of Saint-Géraud-de-Corps
- Location within France Location within Nouvelle-Aquitaine
- Coordinates: 44°57′10″N 0°13′38″E
- Country: France
- Region: Nouvelle-Aquitaine
- Department: Dordogne
- Arrondissement: Bergerac
- Canton: Pays de Montaigne et Gurson

Government
  - Mayor (2020–2026): Thierry Boidé
- Area^{1}: 14.95 km^{2} (5.77 sq mi)
- Elevation: 9 m (30 ft)
- Highest elevation: 127 m (417 ft)
- Lowest elevation: 40 m (130 ft)
- Population (2023): 202
  - Density: 13.5/km^{2} (35.0/sq mi)
- Time zone: UTC+01:00 (CET)
  - Summer (DST): UTC+02:00 (CEST)
- INSEE/Postal code: 24415 /24700
- ^{1} French Land Register data, which excludes lakes, ponds, glaciers > 1 km^{2} (0.386 sq mi or 247 acres) and river estuaries.

Saint-Géraud-de-Corps (French pronunciation: [sɛ̃ ʒeʁo də kɔʁ]; Occitan: Sent Giraud de Còrbs) is a commune in the Dordogne department in Nouvelle-Aquitaine in southwestern France.

== Population ==
Historical population
| Year | Pop. | ±% p.a. |
|---|---|---|
| 1968 | 149 | — |
| 1975 | 152 | +0.29% |
| 1982 | 149 | −0.28% |
| 1990 | 150 | +0.08% |
| 1999 | 167 | +1.20% |
| 2007 | 197 | +2.09% |
| 2012 | 182 | −1.57% |
| 2017 | 243 | +5.95% |
| 2023 | 202 | −3.03% |
Source: INSEE

== See also ==
- Communes of the Dordogne department
