= Port-Sainte-Foy-et-Ponchapt =

- Commune
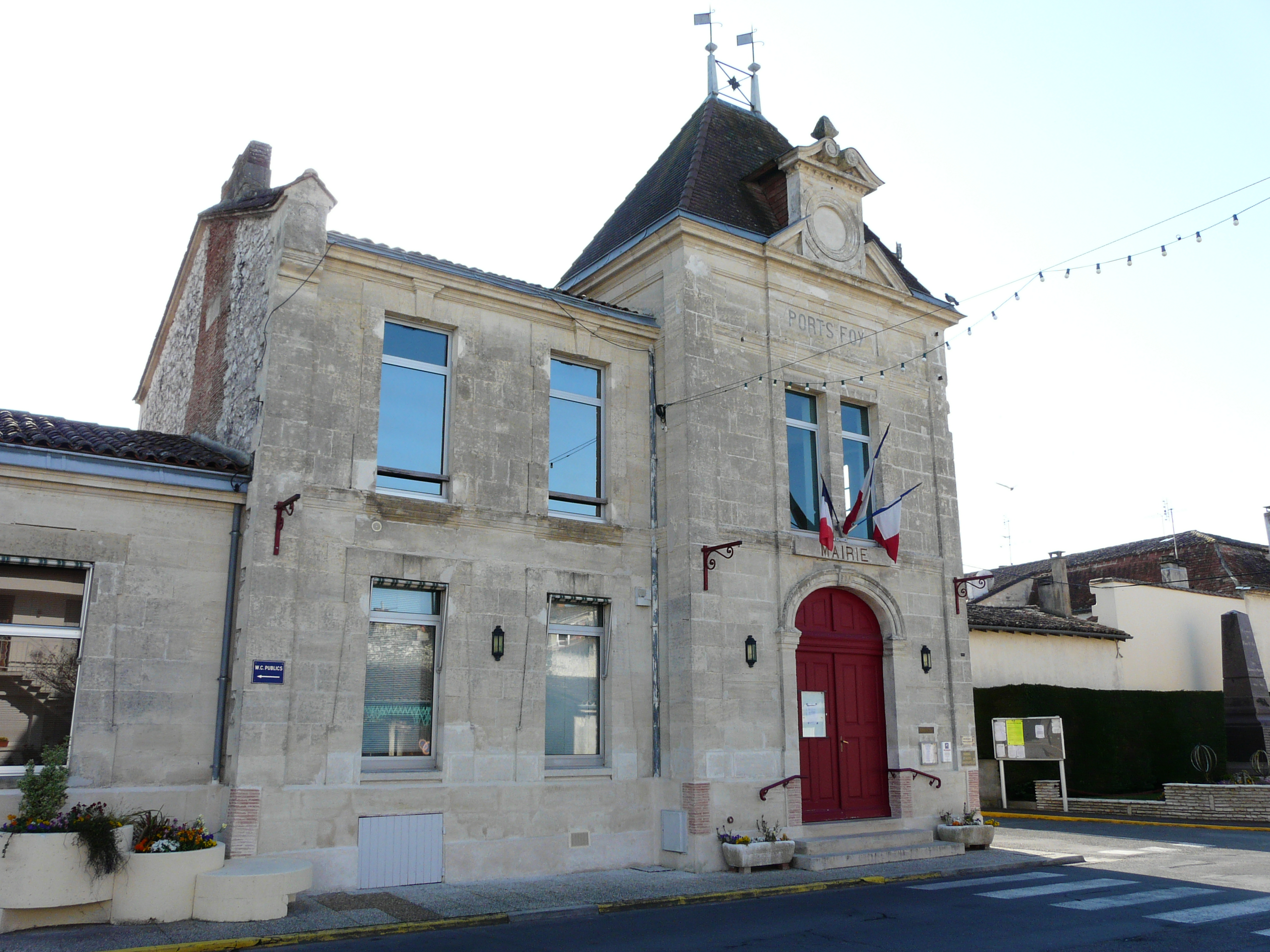
- The town hall in Port-Sainte-Foy

- Coat of arms
- Location of Port-Sainte-Foy-et-Ponchapt
- Location within France Location within Nouvelle-Aquitaine
- Coordinates: 44°50′N 0°13′E
- Country: France
- Region: Nouvelle-Aquitaine
- Department: Dordogne
- Arrondissement: Bergerac
- Canton: Pays de Montaigne et Gurson
- Intercommunality: Pays Foyen

Government
  - Mayor (2020–2026): Jacques Reix
- Area^{1}: 18.32 km^{2} (7.07 sq mi)
- Elevation: 18 m (59 ft)
- Highest elevation: 167 m (548 ft)
- Lowest elevation: 7 m (23 ft)
- Population (2023): 2,520
  - Density: 138/km^{2} (356/sq mi)
- Time zone: UTC+01:00 (CET)
  - Summer (DST): UTC+02:00 (CEST)
- INSEE/Postal code: 24335 /33220
- ^{1} French Land Register data, which excludes lakes, ponds, glaciers > 1 km^{2} (0.386 sq mi or 247 acres) and river estuaries.

Port-Sainte-Foy-et-Ponchapt (French pronunciation: [pɔʁ sɛ̃t fwa e pɔ̃ʃa]; Occitan: Lo Pòrt de Senta Fe e Ponchac) is a commune in the Dordogne department in Nouvelle-Aquitaine in southwestern France.

== Population ==
Historical population
Year	Pop.	±% p.a.
1968	1,798	—
1975	1,872	+0.58%
1982	2,093	+1.61%
1990	2,222	+0.75%
1999	2,345	+0.60%
2007	2,357	+0.06%
2012	2,496	+1.15%
2017	2,498	+0.02%
2023	2,520	+0.15%
Source: INSEE

== See also ==
- Communes of the Dordogne department
