= Montpeyroux, Dordogne =

Montpeyroux
- Commune
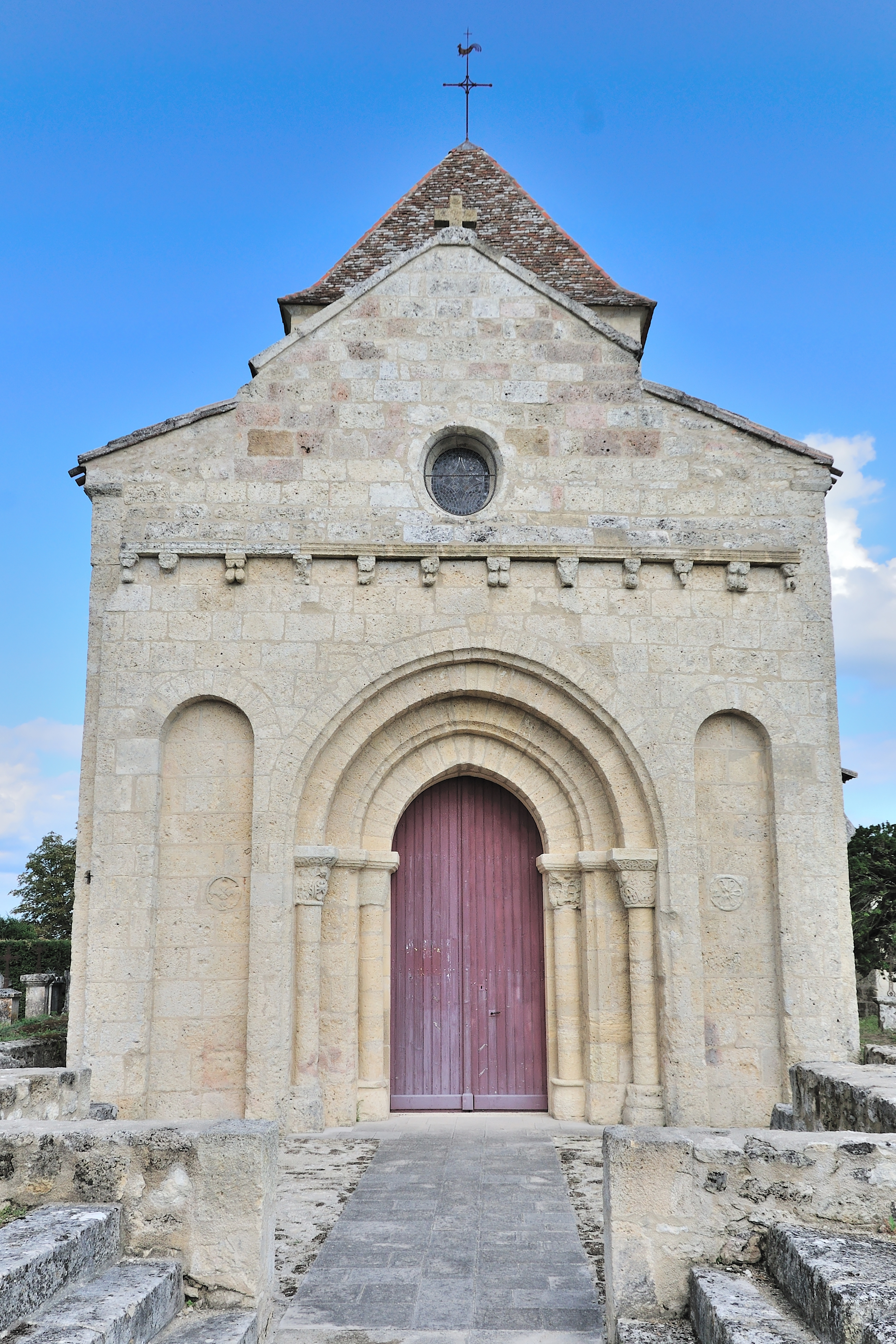
- The church in Montpeyroux

- Coat of arms
- Location of Montpeyroux
- Location within France Location within Nouvelle-Aquitaine
- Coordinates: 44°55′16″N 0°03′28″E
- Country: France
- Region: Nouvelle-Aquitaine
- Department: Dordogne
- Arrondissement: Bergerac
- Canton: Pays de Montaigne et Gurson

Government
  - Mayor (2020–2026): Christophe Marceteau
- Area^{1}: 23.37 km^{2} (9.02 sq mi)
- Elevation: 100 m (330 ft)
- Highest elevation: 100 m (330 ft)
- Lowest elevation: 17 m (56 ft)
- Population (2023): 496
  - Density: 21.2/km^{2} (55.0/sq mi)
- Time zone: UTC+01:00 (CET)
  - Summer (DST): UTC+02:00 (CEST)
- INSEE/Postal code: 24292 /24610
- ^{1} French Land Register data, which excludes lakes, ponds, glaciers > 1 km^{2} (0.386 sq mi or 247 acres) and river estuaries.

Montpeyroux (French pronunciation: [mɔ̃peʁu]; Occitan: Montpeirós) is a commune in the Dordogne department in Nouvelle-Aquitaine in southwestern France.

== Population ==
Historical population
Year	Pop.	±% p.a.
1968	452	—
1975	359	−3.24%
1982	318	−1.72%
1990	338	+0.77%
1999	360	+0.70%
2007	420	+1.95%
2012	450	+1.39%
2017	442	−0.36%
2023	496	+1.94%
Source: INSEE

== See also ==
- Communes of the Dordogne department
