= Lolme =

Lolme may refer to:

- Jean-Louis de Lolme (1741–1804), Swiss political theorist
- Lolme, Dordogne, a commune in the French département of Dordogne
