= Saint-Cassien =

Saint-Cassien may refer to the following places in France:

- Saint-Cassien, Dordogne, a commune in the Dordogne department
- Saint-Cassien, Isère, a commune in the Isère department
