= Pezuls =

- Commune
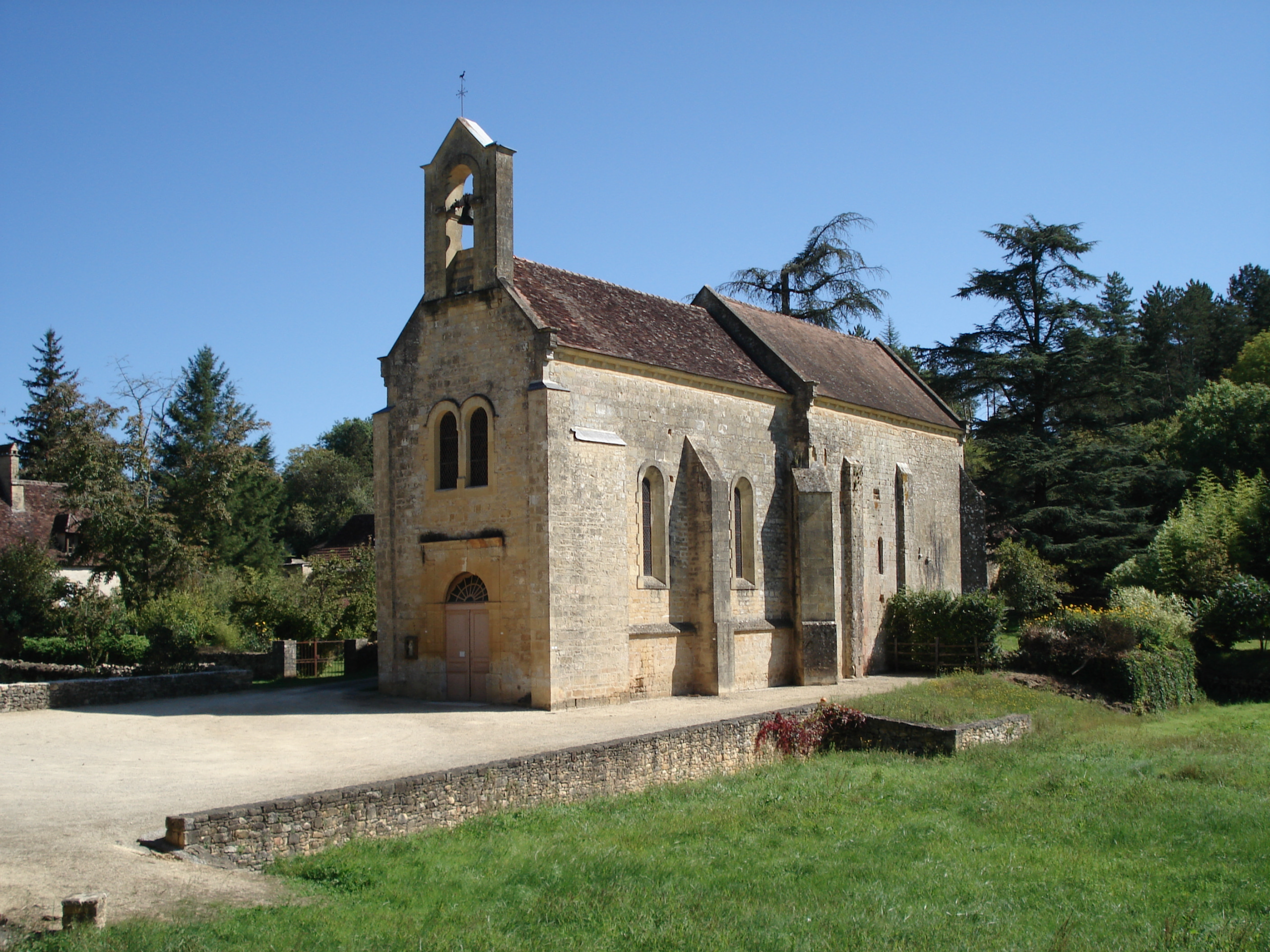
- The church in Pezuls
- Location of Pezuls
- Location within France Location within Nouvelle-Aquitaine
- Coordinates: 44°54′51″N 0°48′30″E
- Country: France
- Region: Nouvelle-Aquitaine
- Department: Dordogne
- Arrondissement: Bergerac
- Canton: Lalinde

Government
  - Mayor (2020–2026): Roger Berland
- Area^{1}: 10.38 km^{2} (4.01 sq mi)
- Elevation: 112 m (367 ft)
- Highest elevation: 213 m (699 ft)
- Lowest elevation: 75 m (246 ft)
- Population (2023): 113
  - Density: 10.9/km^{2} (28.2/sq mi)
- Time zone: UTC+01:00 (CET)
  - Summer (DST): UTC+02:00 (CEST)
- INSEE/Postal code: 24327 /24510
- ^{1} French Land Register data, which excludes lakes, ponds, glaciers > 1 km^{2} (0.386 sq mi or 247 acres) and river estuaries.

Pezuls (French pronunciation: [pəzyl]; Occitan: Pesulh) is a commune in the Dordogne department in Nouvelle-Aquitaine in southwestern France.

== Population ==
Historical population
Year	Pop.	±% p.a.
1968	138	—
1975	119	−2.09%
1982	133	+1.60%
1990	130	−0.28%
1999	137	+0.58%
2007	121	−1.54%
2012	110	−1.89%
2017	122	+2.09%
2023	113	−1.27%
Source: INSEE

== See also ==
- Communes of the Dordogne department
