= Vergt-de-Biron =

- Commune
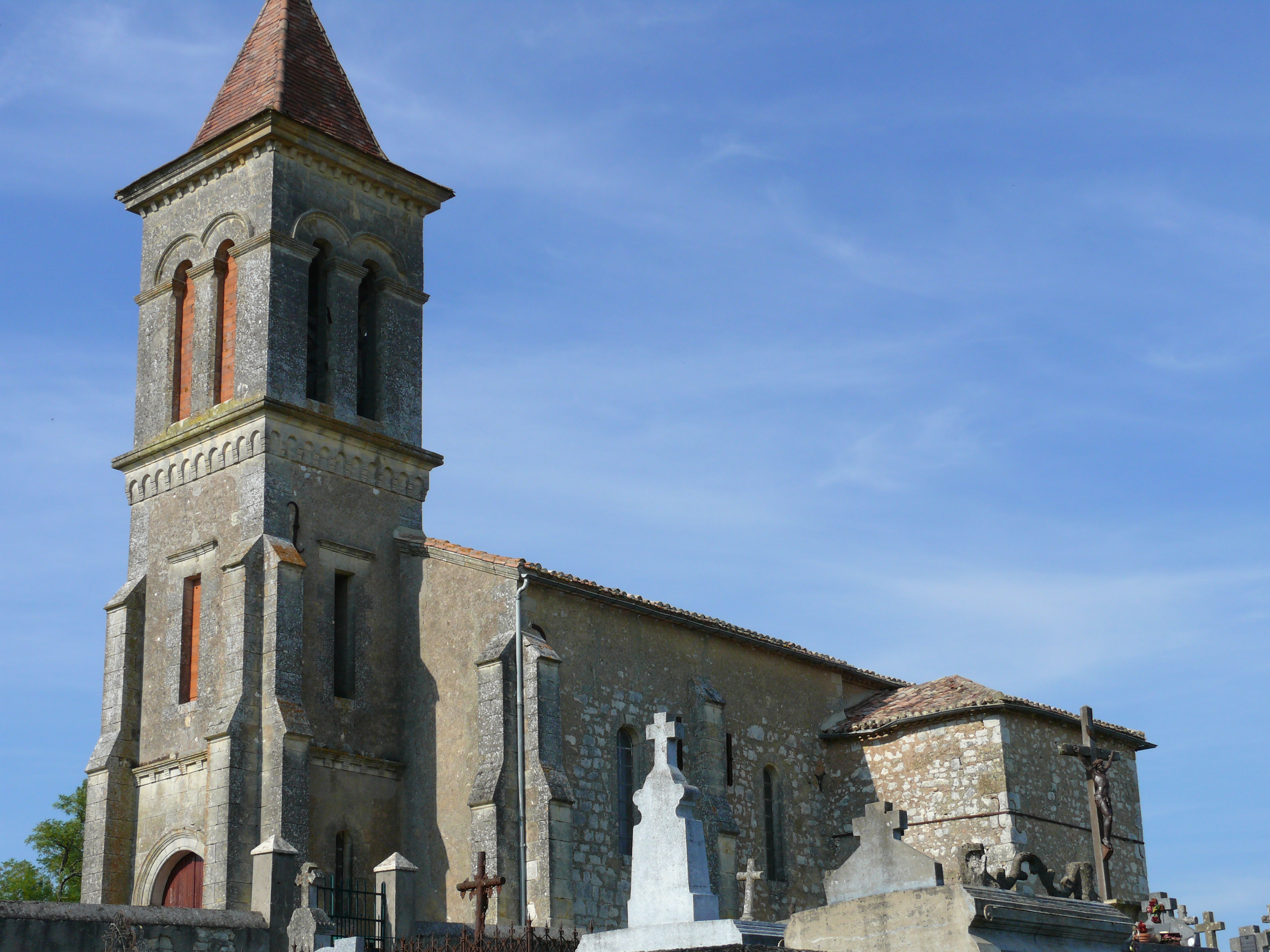
- The church in Vergt-de-Biron
- Location of Vergt-de-Biron
- Location within France Location within Nouvelle-Aquitaine
- Coordinates: 44°38′02″N 0°50′32″E
- Country: France
- Region: Nouvelle-Aquitaine
- Department: Dordogne
- Arrondissement: Bergerac
- Canton: Lalinde
- Intercommunality: Bastides Dordogne-Périgord

Government
  - Mayor (2020–2026): Laurent Bagilet
- Area^{1}: 16.17 km^{2} (6.24 sq mi)
- Elevation: 190 m (620 ft)
- Highest elevation: 209 m (686 ft)
- Lowest elevation: 111 m (364 ft)
- Population (2023): 191
  - Density: 11.8/km^{2} (30.6/sq mi)
- Time zone: UTC+01:00 (CET)
  - Summer (DST): UTC+02:00 (CEST)
- INSEE/Postal code: 24572 /24540
- ^{1} French Land Register data, which excludes lakes, ponds, glaciers > 1 km^{2} (0.386 sq mi or 247 acres) and river estuaries.

Vergt-de-Biron (French pronunciation: [vɛʁ də biʁɔ̃]; Occitan: Al Vèrn) is a commune in the Dordogne department in Nouvelle-Aquitaine in southwestern France.

== Population ==
Historical population
Year	Pop.	±% p.a.
1968	188	—
1975	171	−1.34%
1982	181	+0.82%
1990	190	+0.61%
1999	182	−0.48%
2007	194	+0.80%
2012	186	−0.84%
2017	194	+0.85%
2023	191	−0.26%
Source: INSEE

== See also ==
- Communes of the Dordogne department
