= Monsac =

- Commune
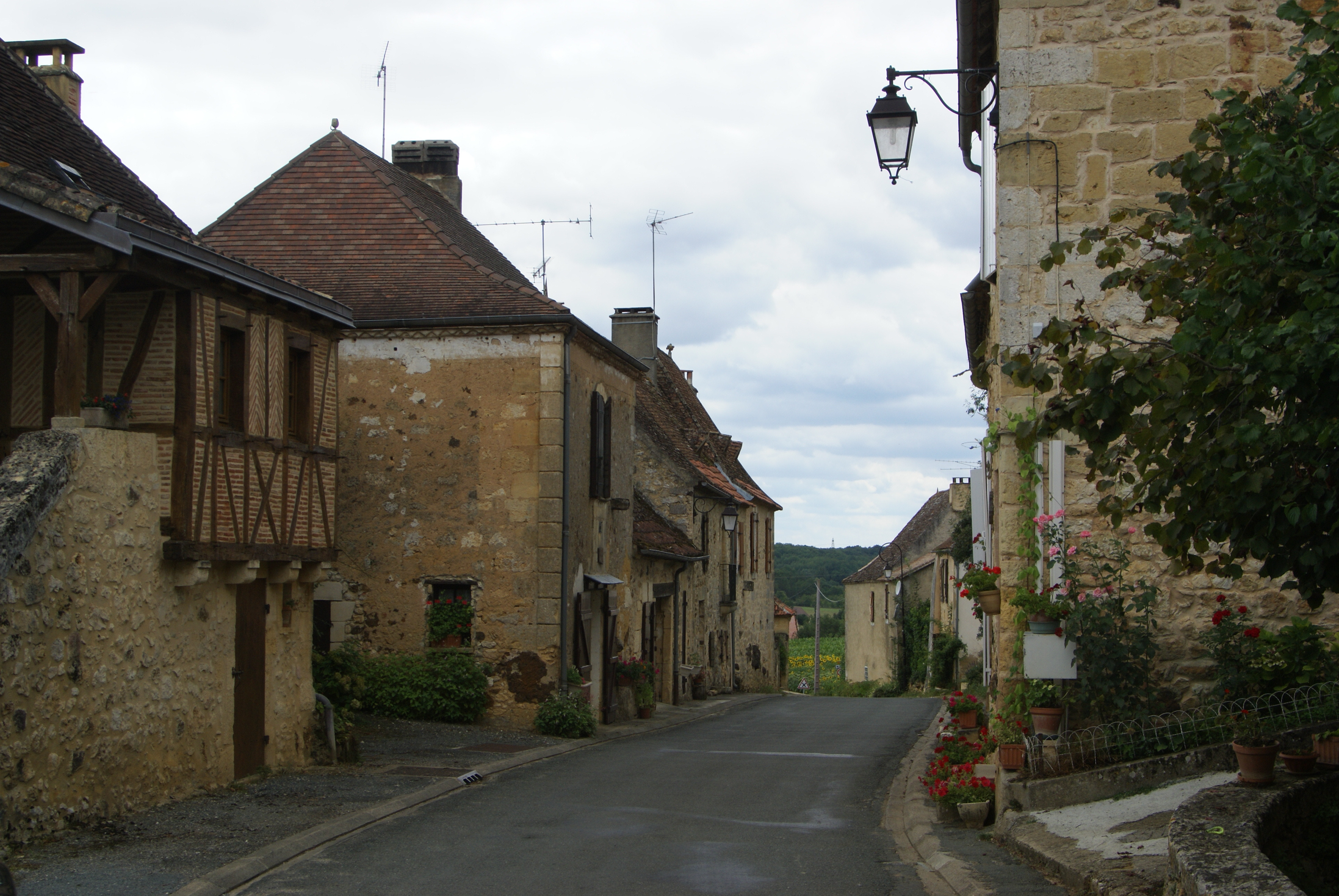
- The main street in Monsac

- Coat of arms
- Location of Monsac
- Location within France Location within Nouvelle-Aquitaine
- Coordinates: 44°46′47″N 0°41′51″E
- Country: France
- Region: Nouvelle-Aquitaine
- Department: Dordogne
- Arrondissement: Bergerac
- Canton: Lalinde

Government
  - Mayor (2020–2026): Daniel Ségala
- Area^{1}: 10.74 km^{2} (4.15 sq mi)
- Elevation: 90 m (300 ft)
- Highest elevation: 172 m (564 ft)
- Lowest elevation: 63 m (207 ft)
- Population (2023): 178
  - Density: 16.6/km^{2} (42.9/sq mi)
- Time zone: UTC+01:00 (CET)
  - Summer (DST): UTC+02:00 (CEST)
- INSEE/Postal code: 24281 /24440
- ^{1} French Land Register data, which excludes lakes, ponds, glaciers > 1 km^{2} (0.386 sq mi or 247 acres) and river estuaries.

Monsac (French pronunciation: [mɔ̃sak]) is a commune in the Dordogne department in Nouvelle-Aquitaine in southwestern France.

== Population ==
Historical population
Year	Pop.	±% p.a.
1968	158	—
1975	137	−2.02%
1982	122	−1.64%
1990	145	+2.18%
1999	191	+3.11%
2007	178	−0.88%
2012	194	+1.74%
2017	192	−0.21%
2023	178	−1.25%
Source: INSEE

== See also ==
- Communes of the Dordogne department
