= Saint-Romain-de-Monpazier =

- Commune
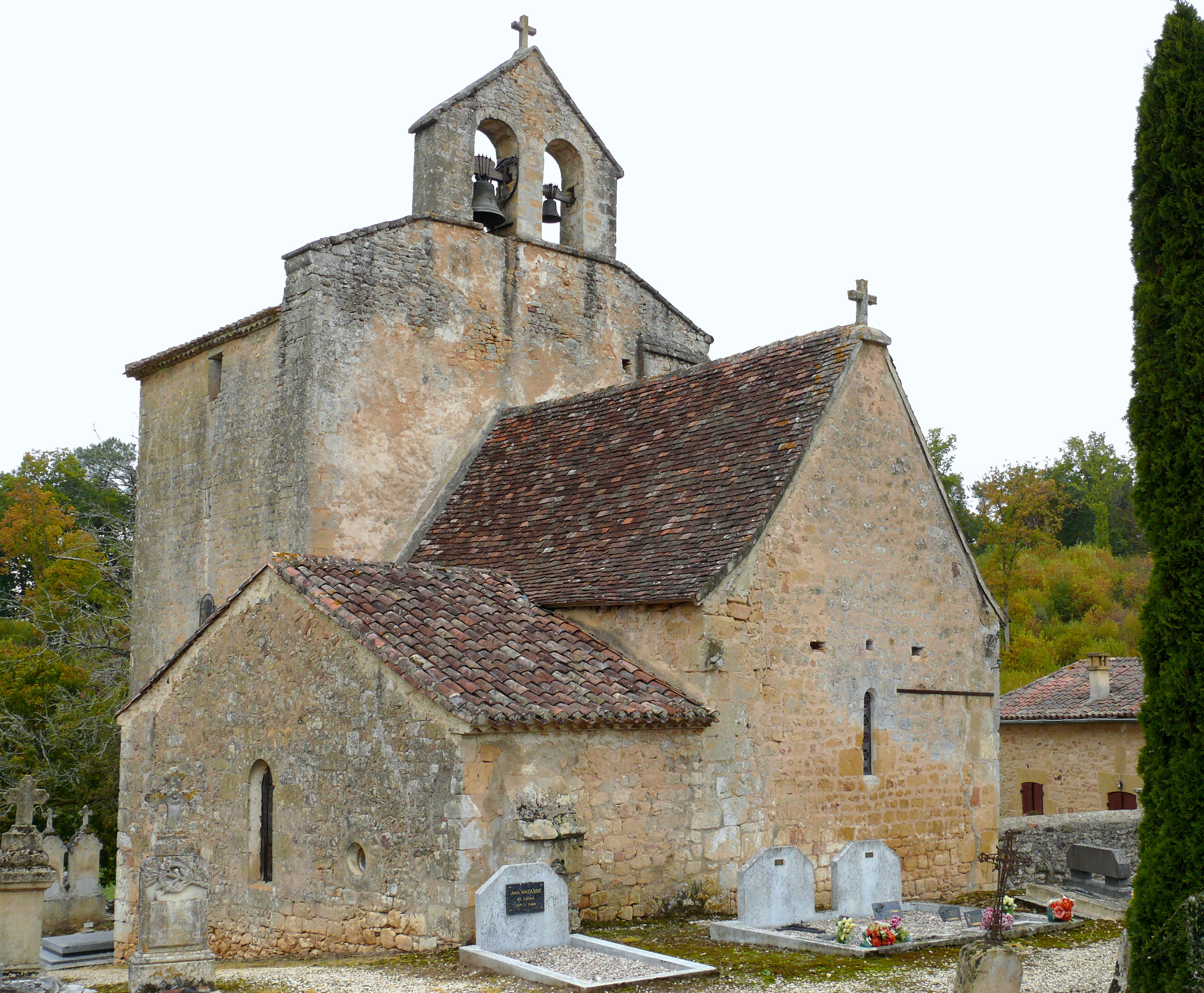
- The church in Saint-Romain-de-Monpazier
- Location of Saint-Romain-de-Monpazier
- Location within France Location within Nouvelle-Aquitaine
- Coordinates: 44°43′07″N 0°52′18″E
- Country: France
- Region: Nouvelle-Aquitaine
- Department: Dordogne
- Arrondissement: Bergerac
- Canton: Lalinde

Government
  - Mayor (2020–2026): Gérard Chansard
- Area^{1}: 7.48 km^{2} (2.89 sq mi)
- Highest elevation: 227 m (745 ft)
- Lowest elevation: 116 m (381 ft)
- Population (2023): 104
  - Density: 13.9/km^{2} (36.0/sq mi)
- Time zone: UTC+01:00 (CET)
  - Summer (DST): UTC+02:00 (CEST)
- INSEE/Postal code: 24495 /24540
- ^{1} French Land Register data, which excludes lakes, ponds, glaciers > 1 km^{2} (0.386 sq mi or 247 acres) and river estuaries.

Saint-Romain-de-Monpazier (French pronunciation: [sɛ̃ ʁɔmɛ̃ də mɔ̃pazje]; Occitan: Sent Roma de Montpasièr) is a commune in the Dordogne department in Nouvelle-Aquitaine in southwestern France.

== Population ==
Historical population
Year	Pop.	±% p.a.
1968	72	—
1975	62	−2.11%
1982	67	+1.11%
1990	78	+1.92%
1999	91	+1.73%
2007	78	−1.91%
2012	93	+3.58%
2017	110	+3.41%
2023	104	−0.93%
Source: INSEE

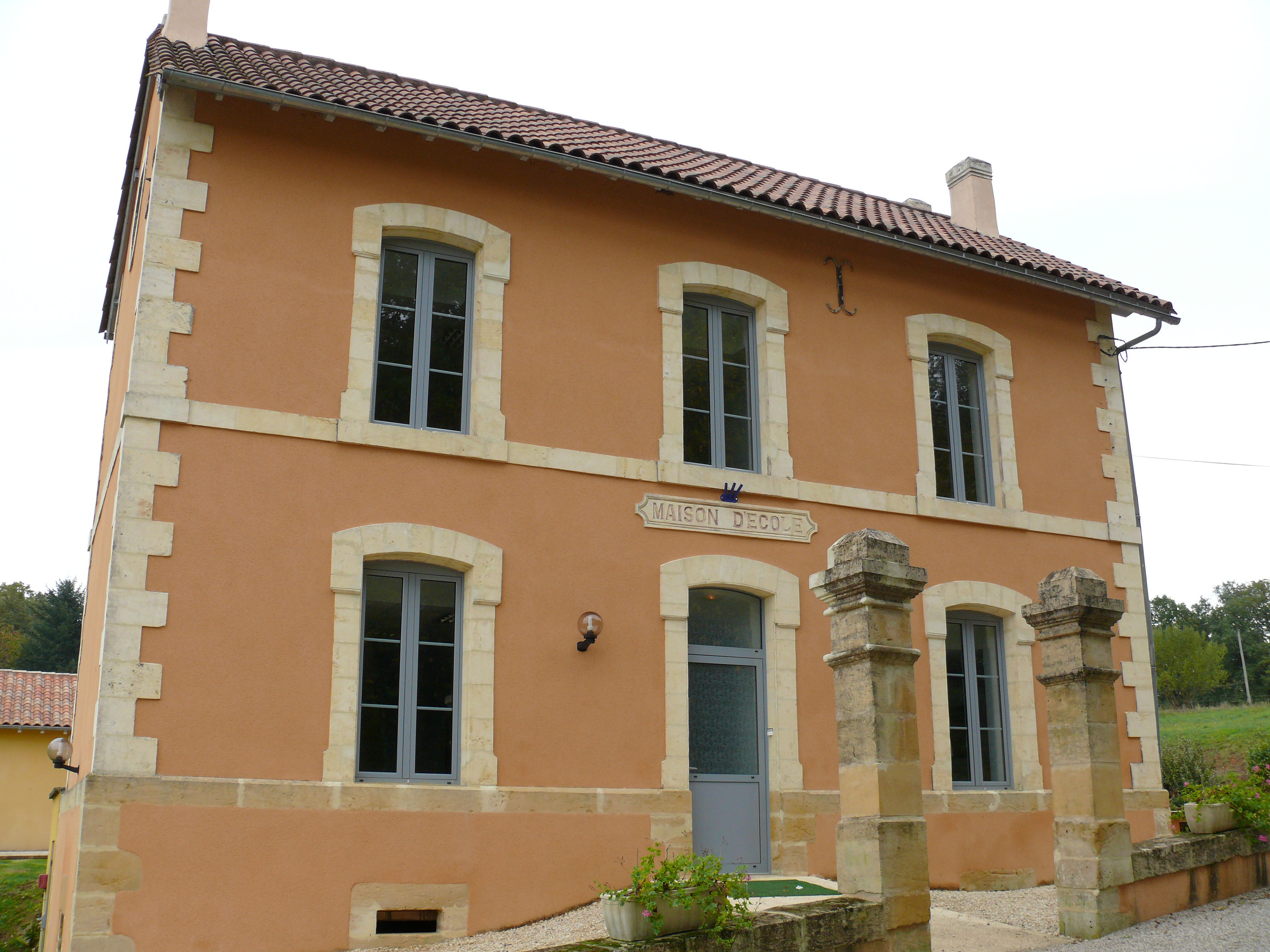
Town hall

== See also ==
- Communes of the Dordogne department
