= Marsalès =

- Commune
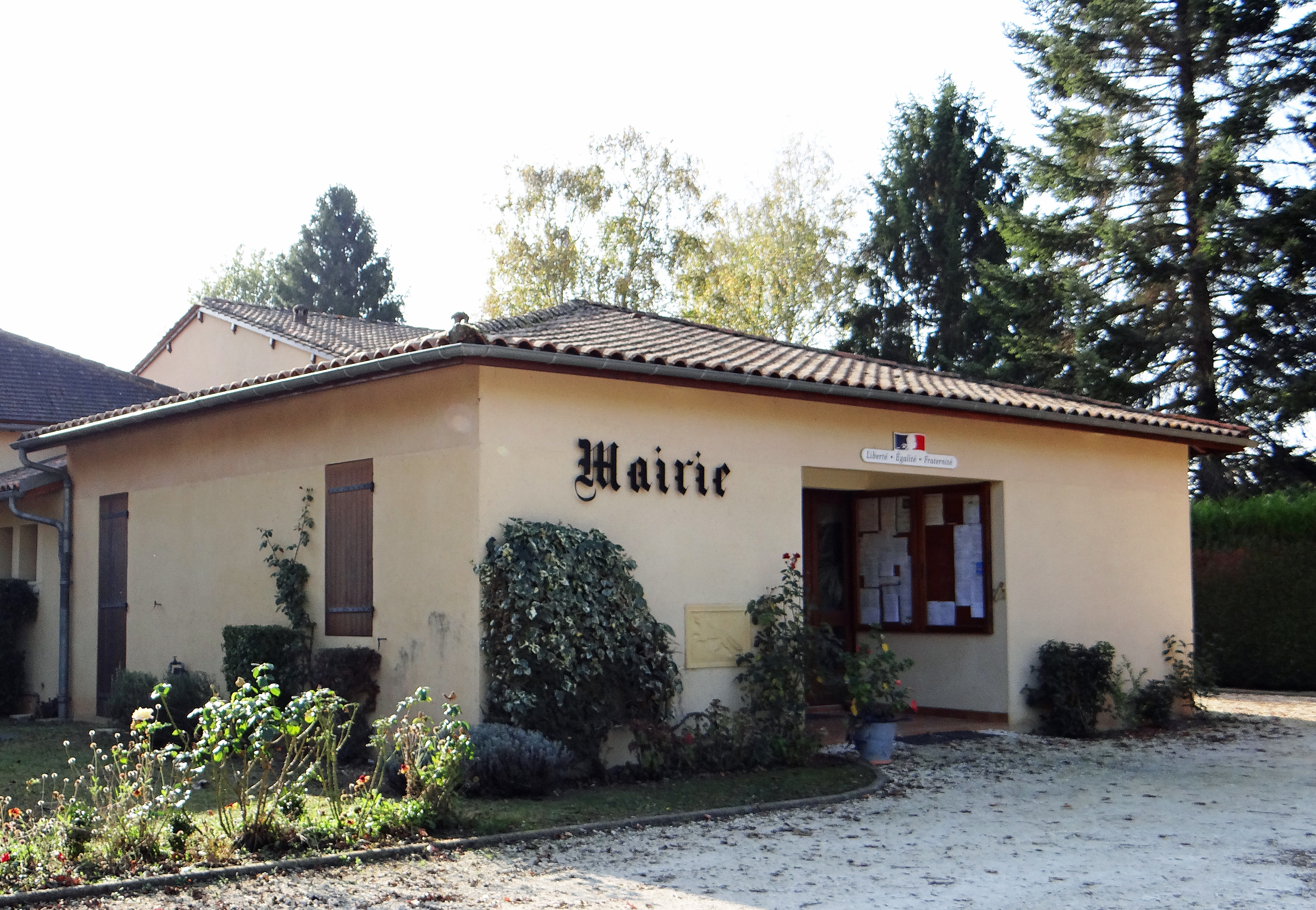
- The town hall in Marsalès
- Location of Marsalès
- Location within France Location within Nouvelle-Aquitaine
- Coordinates: 44°42′11″N 0°53′10″E
- Country: France
- Region: Nouvelle-Aquitaine
- Department: Dordogne
- Arrondissement: Bergerac
- Canton: Lalinde

Government
  - Mayor (2020–2026): Jean-Pierre Prêtre
- Area^{1}: 9.43 km^{2} (3.64 sq mi)
- Elevation: 170 m (560 ft)
- Highest elevation: 232 m (761 ft)
- Lowest elevation: 135 m (443 ft)
- Population (2023): 223
  - Density: 23.6/km^{2} (61.2/sq mi)
- Time zone: UTC+01:00 (CET)
  - Summer (DST): UTC+02:00 (CEST)
- INSEE/Postal code: 24257 /24540
- ^{1} French Land Register data, which excludes lakes, ponds, glaciers > 1 km^{2} (0.386 sq mi or 247 acres) and river estuaries.

Marsalès (French pronunciation: [maʁsalɛs]; Occitan: Marçalés) is a commune in the Dordogne department in Nouvelle-Aquitaine in southwestern France.

== Population ==
Historical population
Year	Pop.	±% p.a.
1968	144	—
1975	169	+2.31%
1982	204	+2.73%
1990	204	+0.00%
1999	204	+0.00%
2007	218	+0.83%
2012	243	+2.20%
2017	234	−0.75%
2023	223	−0.80%
Source: INSEE

== See also ==
- Communes of the Dordogne department
