= Lavalade =

- Commune
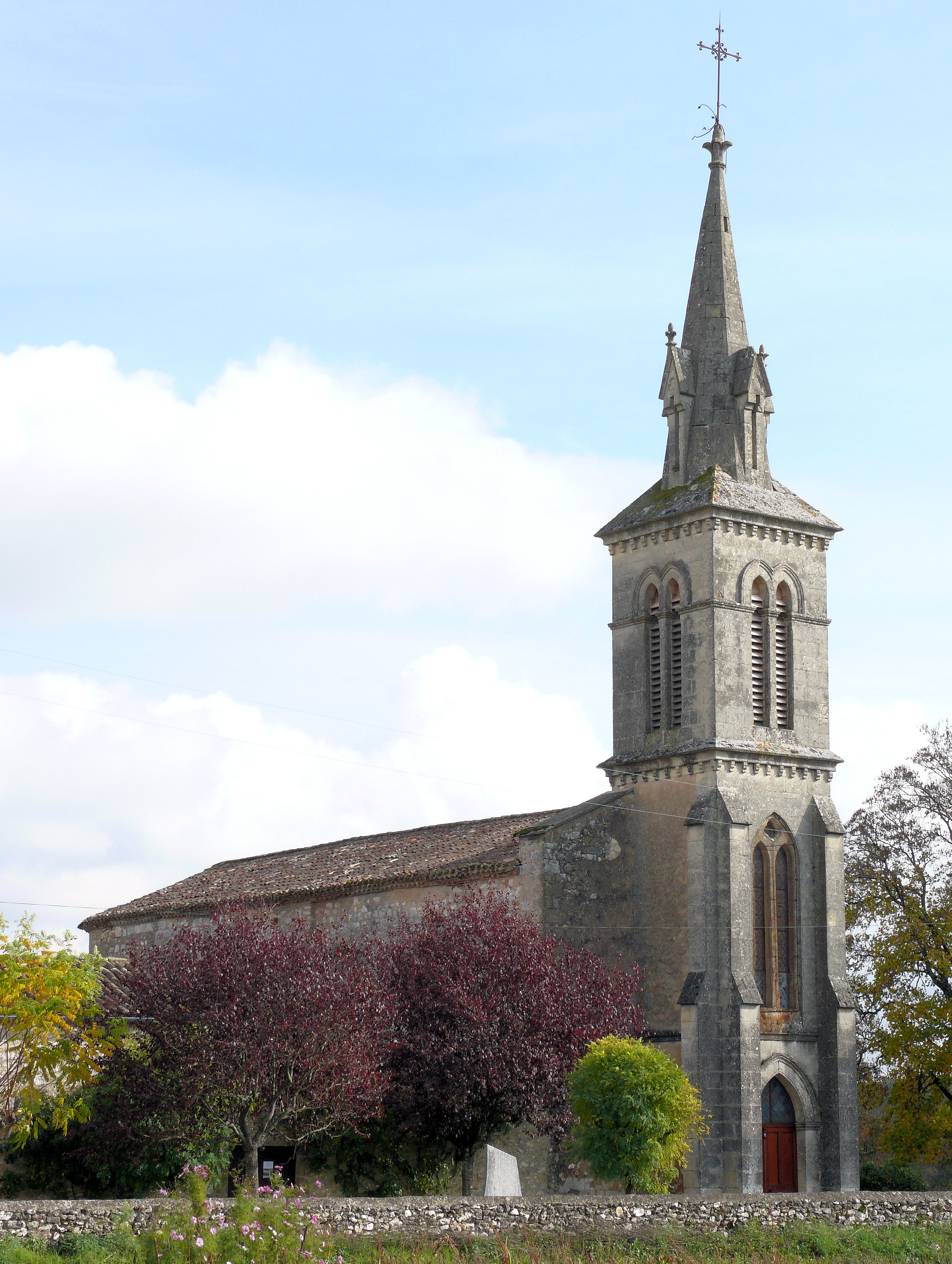
- The church in Lavalade
- Location of Lavalade
- Location within France Location within Nouvelle-Aquitaine
- Coordinates: 44°41′47″N 0°51′51″E
- Country: France
- Region: Nouvelle-Aquitaine
- Department: Dordogne
- Arrondissement: Bergerac
- Canton: Lalinde

Government
  - Mayor (2020–2026): Thierry Testut
- Area^{1}: 3.95 km^{2} (1.53 sq mi)
- Elevation: 199 m (653 ft)
- Highest elevation: 220 m (720 ft)
- Lowest elevation: 147 m (482 ft)
- Population (2023): 107
  - Density: 27.1/km^{2} (70.2/sq mi)
- Time zone: UTC+01:00 (CET)
  - Summer (DST): UTC+02:00 (CEST)
- INSEE/Postal code: 24231 /24540
- ^{1} French Land Register data, which excludes lakes, ponds, glaciers > 1 km^{2} (0.386 sq mi or 247 acres) and river estuaries.

Lavalade (French pronunciation: [lavalad]; Occitan: La Valada) is a commune in the Dordogne department in Nouvelle-Aquitaine in southwestern France.

== Population ==
Historical population
Year	Pop.	±% p.a.
1968	81	—
1975	77	−0.72%
1982	55	−4.69%
1990	63	+1.71%
1999	80	+2.69%
2007	105	+3.46%
2012	108	+0.57%
2017	81	−5.59%
2023	107	+4.75%
Source: INSEE

== See also ==
- Communes of the Dordogne department
