= Lanquais =

- Commune
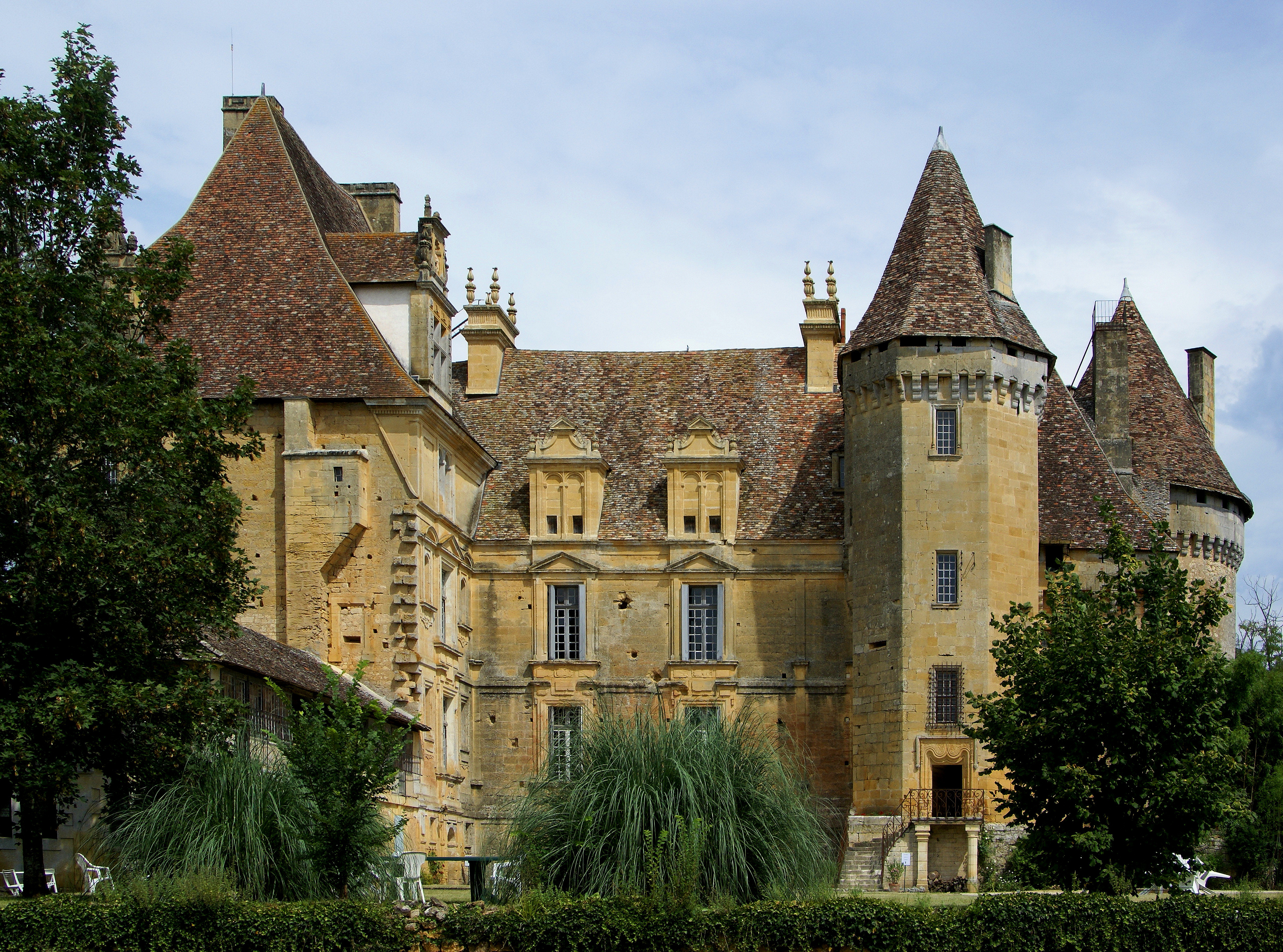
- Chateau

- Coat of arms
- Location of Lanquais
- Location within France Location within Nouvelle-Aquitaine
- Coordinates: 44°49′28″N 0°40′15″E
- Country: France
- Region: Nouvelle-Aquitaine
- Department: Dordogne
- Arrondissement: Bergerac
- Canton: Lalinde

Government
  - Mayor (2020–2026): Michel Blanchet
- Area^{1}: 14.48 km^{2} (5.59 sq mi)
- Elevation: 87 m (285 ft)
- Highest elevation: 173 m (568 ft)
- Lowest elevation: 40 m (130 ft)
- Population (2023): 506
  - Density: 34.9/km^{2} (90.5/sq mi)
- Time zone: UTC+01:00 (CET)
  - Summer (DST): UTC+02:00 (CEST)
- INSEE/Postal code: 24228 /24150
- ^{1} French Land Register data, which excludes lakes, ponds, glaciers > 1 km^{2} (0.386 sq mi or 247 acres) and river estuaries.

Lanquais (French pronunciation: [lɑ̃kɛ]; Occitan: Lencais) is a commune in the Dordogne department in Nouvelle-Aquitaine in southwestern France.

== Population ==
Historical population
Year	Pop.	±% p.a.
1968	530	—
1975	532	+0.05%
1982	526	−0.16%
1990	527	+0.02%
1999	513	−0.30%
2007	493	−0.50%
2012	550	+2.21%
2017	496	−2.05%
2023	506	+0.33%
Source: INSEE

== See also ==
- Communes of the Dordogne department
