= Saint-Marcory =

- Commune
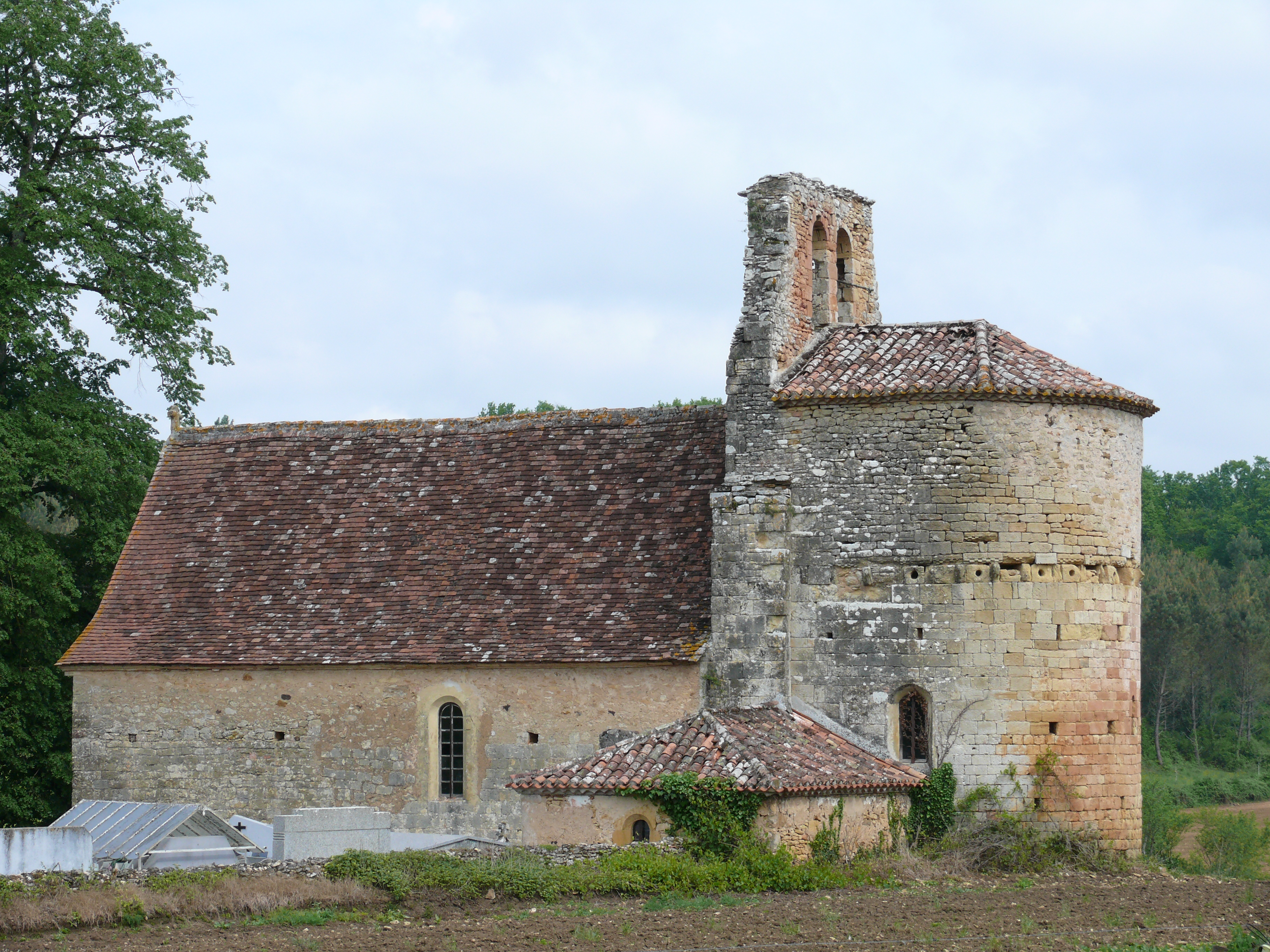
- The church in Saint-Marcory
- Location of Saint-Marcory
- Location within France Location within Nouvelle-Aquitaine
- Coordinates: 44°43′26″N 0°56′01″E
- Country: France
- Region: Nouvelle-Aquitaine
- Department: Dordogne
- Arrondissement: Bergerac
- Canton: Lalinde

Government
  - Mayor (2020–2026): Jean Canzian
- Area^{1}: 4.76 km^{2} (1.84 sq mi)
- Elevation: 196 m (643 ft)
- Highest elevation: 252 m (827 ft)
- Lowest elevation: 154 m (505 ft)
- Population (2023): 57
  - Density: 12/km^{2} (31/sq mi)
- Time zone: UTC+01:00 (CET)
  - Summer (DST): UTC+02:00 (CEST)
- INSEE/Postal code: 24446 /24540
- ^{1} French Land Register data, which excludes lakes, ponds, glaciers > 1 km^{2} (0.386 sq mi or 247 acres) and river estuaries.

Saint-Marcory (French pronunciation: [sɛ̃ maʁkɔʁi]; Occitan: Sent Marcòri) is a commune in the Dordogne department in Nouvelle-Aquitaine in southwestern France.

== Population ==
Historical population
Year	Pop.	±% p.a.
1968	76	—
1975	69	−1.37%
1982	61	−1.75%
1990	58	−0.63%
1999	58	+0.00%
2007	56	−0.44%
2012	54	−0.72%
2017	50	−1.53%
2023	57	+2.21%
Source: INSEE

== See also ==
- Communes of the Dordogne department
