= Canton of Lalinde =

Canton in France

Coordinates: 44.84°N 0.74°E

The canton of Lalinde is an administrative division of the Dordogne department, southwestern France. Its borders were modified at the French canton reorganisation which came into effect in March 2015. Its seat is in Lalinde.

It consists of the following communes:

1. Alles-sur-Dordogne
2. Badefols-sur-Dordogne
3. Baneuil
4. Bayac
5. Beaumontois-en-Périgord
6. Biron
7. Bouillac
8. Bourniquel
9. Le Buisson-de-Cadouin
10. Calès
11. Capdrot
12. Cause-de-Clérans
13. Couze-et-Saint-Front
14. Gaugeac
15. Lalinde
16. Lanquais
17. Lavalade
18. Liorac-sur-Louyre
19. Lolme
20. Marsalès
21. Mauzac-et-Grand-Castang
22. Molières
23. Monpazier
24. Monsac
25. Montferrand-du-Périgord
26. Naussannes
27. Pezuls
28. Pontours
29. Pressignac-Vicq
30. Rampieux
31. Saint-Agne
32. Saint-Avit-Rivière
33. Saint-Avit-Sénieur
34. Saint-Capraise-de-Lalinde
35. Saint-Cassien
36. Sainte-Croix
37. Sainte-Foy-de-Longas
38. Saint-Félix-de-Villadeix
39. Saint-Marcel-du-Périgord
40. Saint-Marcory
41. Saint-Romain-de-Monpazier
42. Soulaures
43. Urval
44. Varennes
45. Verdon
46. Vergt-de-Biron
