= Naussannes =

- Commune
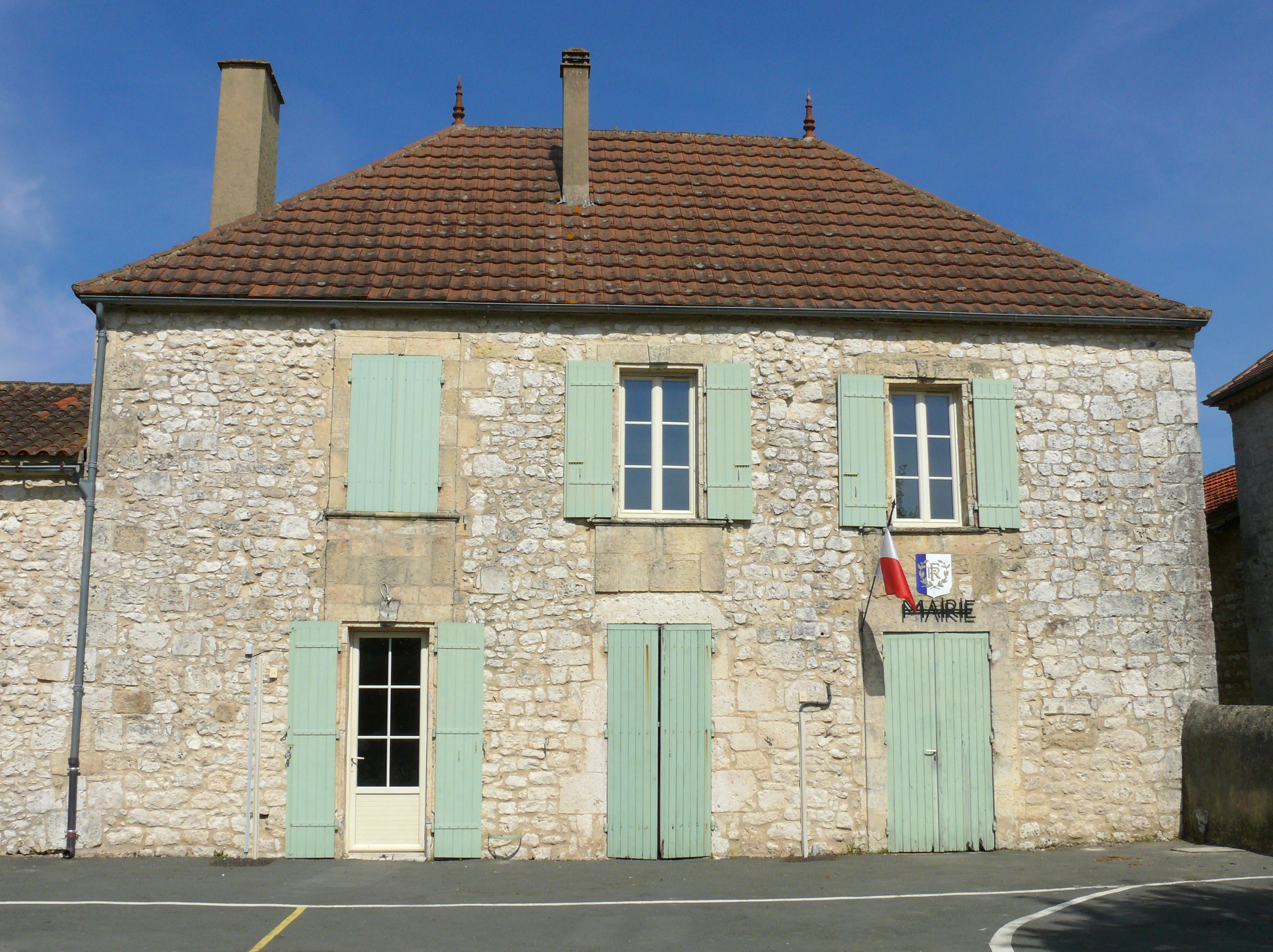
- The town hall in Naussannes
- Location of Naussannes
- Location within France Location within Nouvelle-Aquitaine
- Coordinates: 44°45′22″N 0°43′34″E
- Country: France
- Region: Nouvelle-Aquitaine
- Department: Dordogne
- Arrondissement: Bergerac
- Canton: Lalinde
- Intercommunality: Bastides Dordogne-Périgord

Government
  - Mayor (2020–2026): Alain Roussel
- Area^{1}: 14.82 km^{2} (5.72 sq mi)
- Elevation: 151 m (495 ft)
- Highest elevation: 165 m (541 ft)
- Lowest elevation: 96 m (315 ft)
- Population (2023): 232
  - Density: 15.7/km^{2} (40.5/sq mi)
- Time zone: UTC+01:00 (CET)
  - Summer (DST): UTC+02:00 (CEST)
- INSEE/Postal code: 24307 /24440
- ^{1} French Land Register data, which excludes lakes, ponds, glaciers > 1 km^{2} (0.386 sq mi or 247 acres) and river estuaries.

Naussannes (French pronunciation: [nosan]; Occitan: Nauçanas) is a commune in the Dordogne department in Nouvelle-Aquitaine in southwestern France.

== Population ==
Historical population
Year	Pop.	±% p.a.
1968	238	—
1975	192	−3.02%
1982	194	+0.15%
1990	189	−0.33%
1999	182	−0.42%
2007	217	+2.22%
2012	214	−0.28%
2017	253	+3.40%
2023	232	−1.43%
Source: INSEE

== See also ==
- Communes of the Dordogne department
