= Soulaures =

- Commune
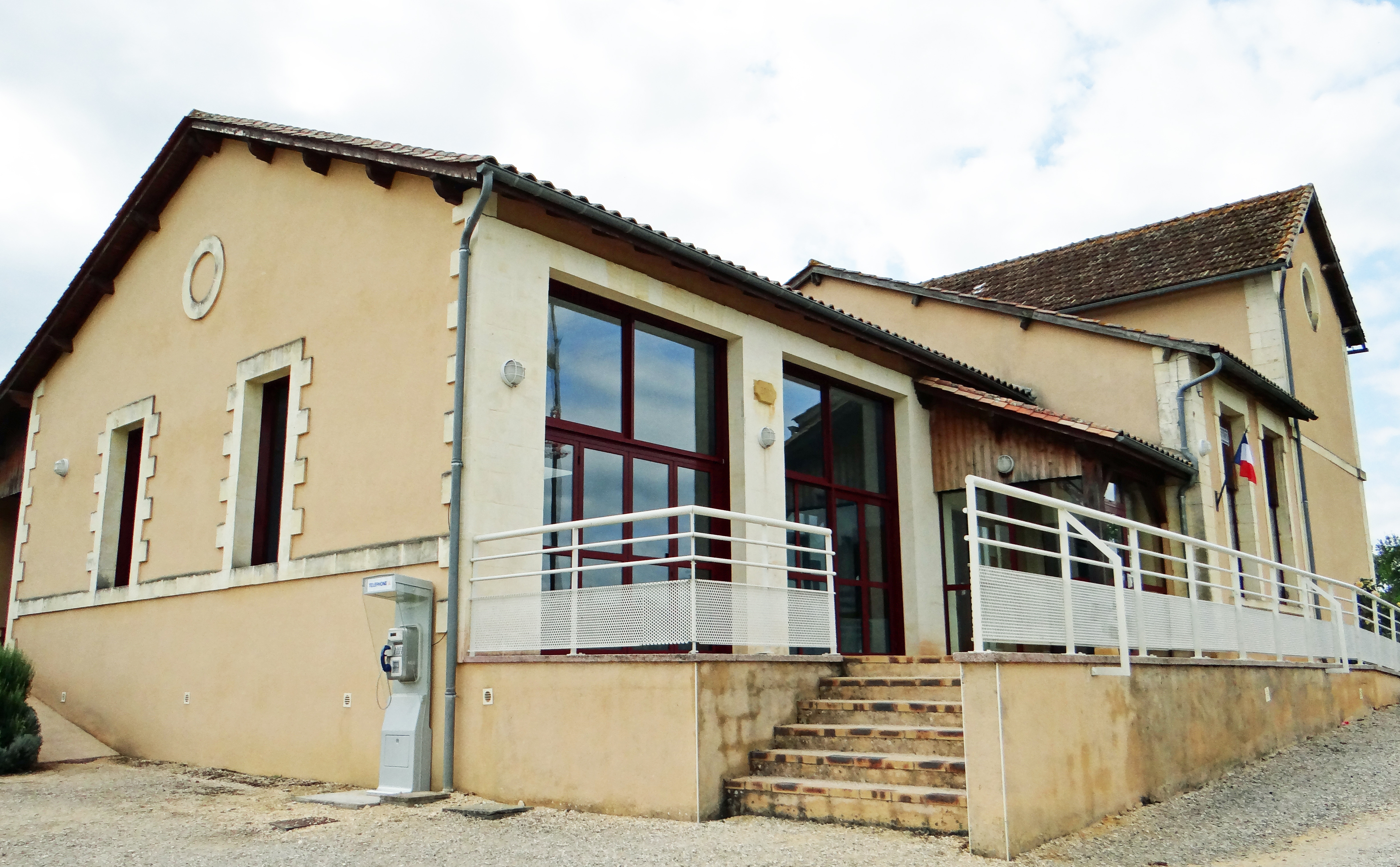
- The town hall in Soulaures
- Location of Soulaures
- Location within France Location within Nouvelle-Aquitaine
- Coordinates: 44°39′04″N 0°55′27″E
- Country: France
- Region: Nouvelle-Aquitaine
- Department: Dordogne
- Arrondissement: Bergerac
- Canton: Lalinde

Government
  - Mayor (2020–2026): Magalie Pistore
- Area^{1}: 10.28 km^{2} (3.97 sq mi)
- Elevation: 241 m (791 ft)
- Highest elevation: 274 m (899 ft)
- Lowest elevation: 168 m (551 ft)
- Population (2023): 67
  - Density: 6.5/km^{2} (17/sq mi)
- Time zone: UTC+01:00 (CET)
  - Summer (DST): UTC+02:00 (CEST)
- INSEE/Postal code: 24542 /24540
- ^{1} French Land Register data, which excludes lakes, ponds, glaciers > 1 km^{2} (0.386 sq mi or 247 acres) and river estuaries.

Soulaures (French pronunciation: [suloʁ]; Occitan: Solaura) is a commune in the Dordogne department in Nouvelle-Aquitaine in southwestern France.

Church of Saint-Martial built in the twelfth century. The small single nave church has a bell placed at the right wall of the triumphal arch.

== Population ==
The inhabitants of Soulaures are called Soulaurais in French.

Historical population
Year	Pop.	±% p.a.
1968	85	—
1975	80	−0.86%
1982	76	−0.73%
1990	72	−0.67%
1999	77	+0.75%
2007	91	+2.11%
2012	72	−4.58%
2017	92	+5.02%
2023	67	−5.15%
Source: INSEE

== See also ==
- Communes of the Dordogne département
