= Saint-Avit-Rivière =

- Commune
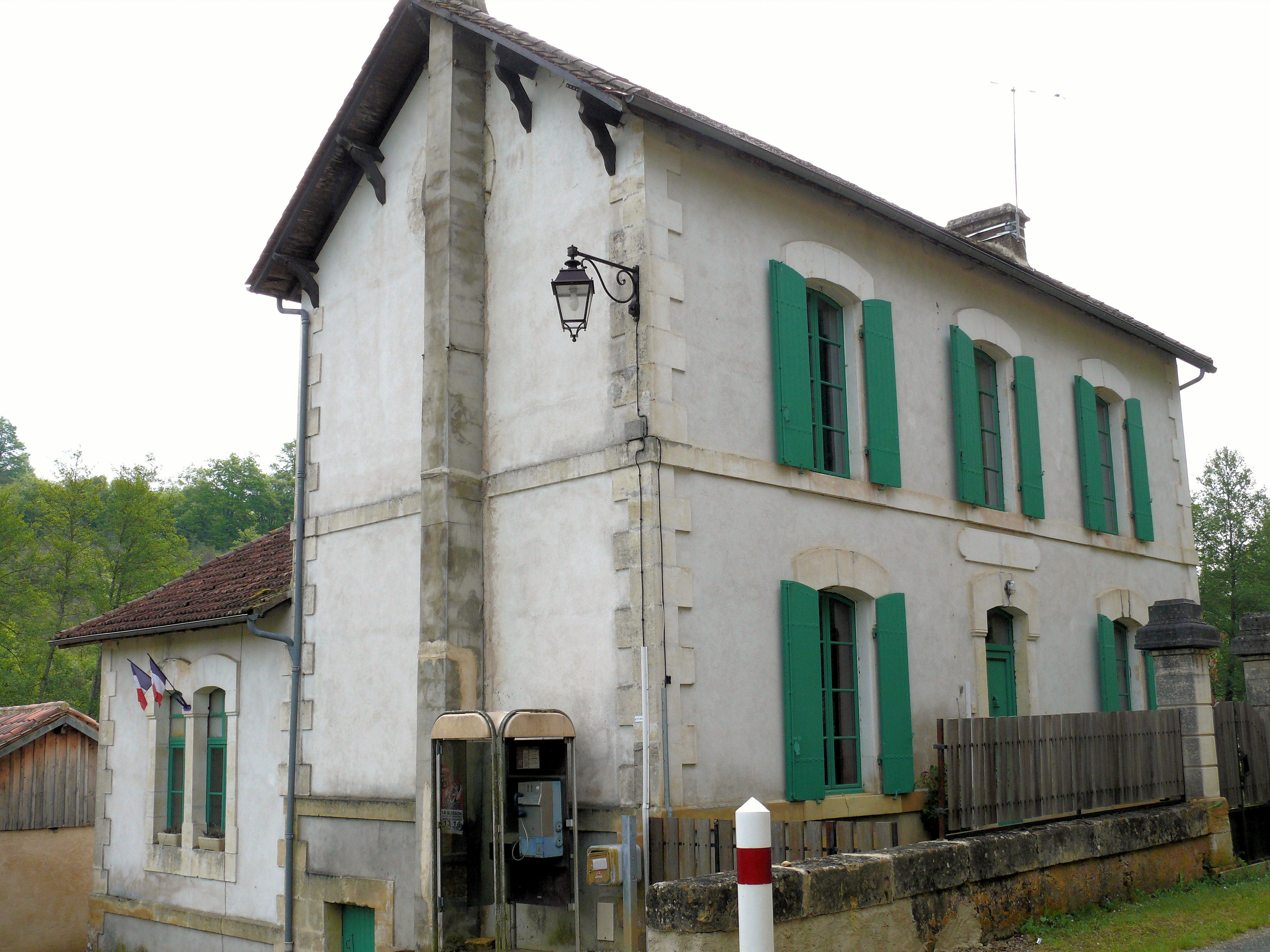
- The town hall in Saint-Avit-Rivière
- Location of Saint-Avit-Rivière
- Location within France Location within Nouvelle-Aquitaine
- Coordinates: 44°45′10″N 0°53′03″E
- Country: France
- Region: Nouvelle-Aquitaine
- Department: Dordogne
- Arrondissement: Bergerac
- Canton: Lalinde

Government
  - Mayor (2020–2026): Isabelle Mucha
- Area^{1}: 14 km^{2} (5.4 sq mi)
- Elevation: 120 m (390 ft)
- Highest elevation: 251 m (823 ft)
- Lowest elevation: 101 m (331 ft)
- Population (2023): 91
  - Density: 6.5/km^{2} (17/sq mi)
- Time zone: UTC+01:00 (CET)
  - Summer (DST): UTC+02:00 (CEST)
- INSEE/Postal code: 24378 /24540
- ^{1} French Land Register data, which excludes lakes, ponds, glaciers > 1 km^{2} (0.386 sq mi or 247 acres) and river estuaries.

Saint-Avit-Rivière (French pronunciation: [sɛ̃.t‿avi ʁivjɛʁ]; Occitan: Sench Avit de Ribièra) is a commune in the Dordogne department in Nouvelle-Aquitaine in southwestern France.

== Population ==
Historical population
Year	Pop.	±% p.a.
1968	102	—
1975	69	−5.43%
1982	71	+0.41%
1990	78	+1.18%
1999	73	−0.73%
2007	81	+1.31%
2012	76	−1.27%
2017	78	+0.52%
2023	91	+2.60%
Source: INSEE

== See also ==
- Communes of the Dordogne department
