= Liorac-sur-Louyre =

- Commune
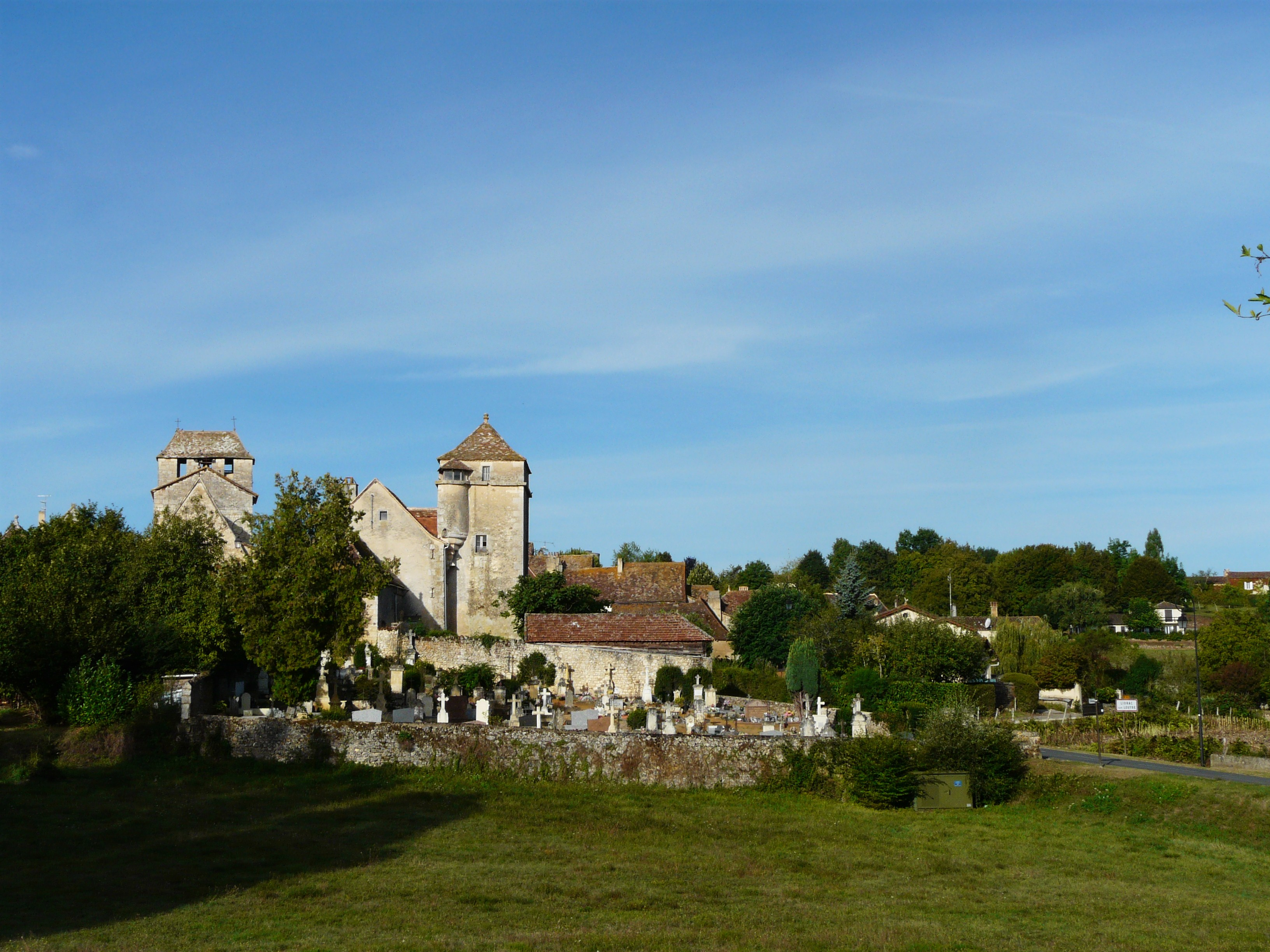
- A general view of Liorac-sur-Louyre
- Location of Liorac-sur-Louyre
- Location within France Location within Nouvelle-Aquitaine
- Coordinates: 44°53′52″N 0°38′44″E
- Country: France
- Region: Nouvelle-Aquitaine
- Department: Dordogne
- Arrondissement: Bergerac
- Canton: Lalinde

Government
  - Mayor (2020–2026): Jean-Claude Monteil
- Area^{1}: 20.27 km^{2} (7.83 sq mi)
- Elevation: 116 m (381 ft)
- Highest elevation: 177 m (581 ft)
- Lowest elevation: 63 m (207 ft)
- Population (2023): 259
  - Density: 12.8/km^{2} (33.1/sq mi)
- Time zone: UTC+01:00 (CET)
  - Summer (DST): UTC+02:00 (CEST)
- INSEE/Postal code: 24242 /24520
- ^{1} French Land Register data, which excludes lakes, ponds, glaciers > 1 km^{2} (0.386 sq mi or 247 acres) and river estuaries.

Liorac-sur-Louyre (French pronunciation: [ljɔʁak syʁ lwiʁ]; Occitan: Lieurac de Loira) is a commune in the Dordogne department in Nouvelle-Aquitaine in southwestern France.

== Population ==
Historical population
Year	Pop.	±% p.a.
1968	231	—
1975	217	−0.89%
1982	212	−0.33%
1990	270	+3.07%
1999	247	−0.98%
2007	222	−1.33%
2012	232	+0.89%
2017	245	+1.10%
2023	259	+0.93%
Source: INSEE

== See also ==
- Communes of the Dordognothere department
