= Saint-Capraise-de-Lalinde =

- Commune
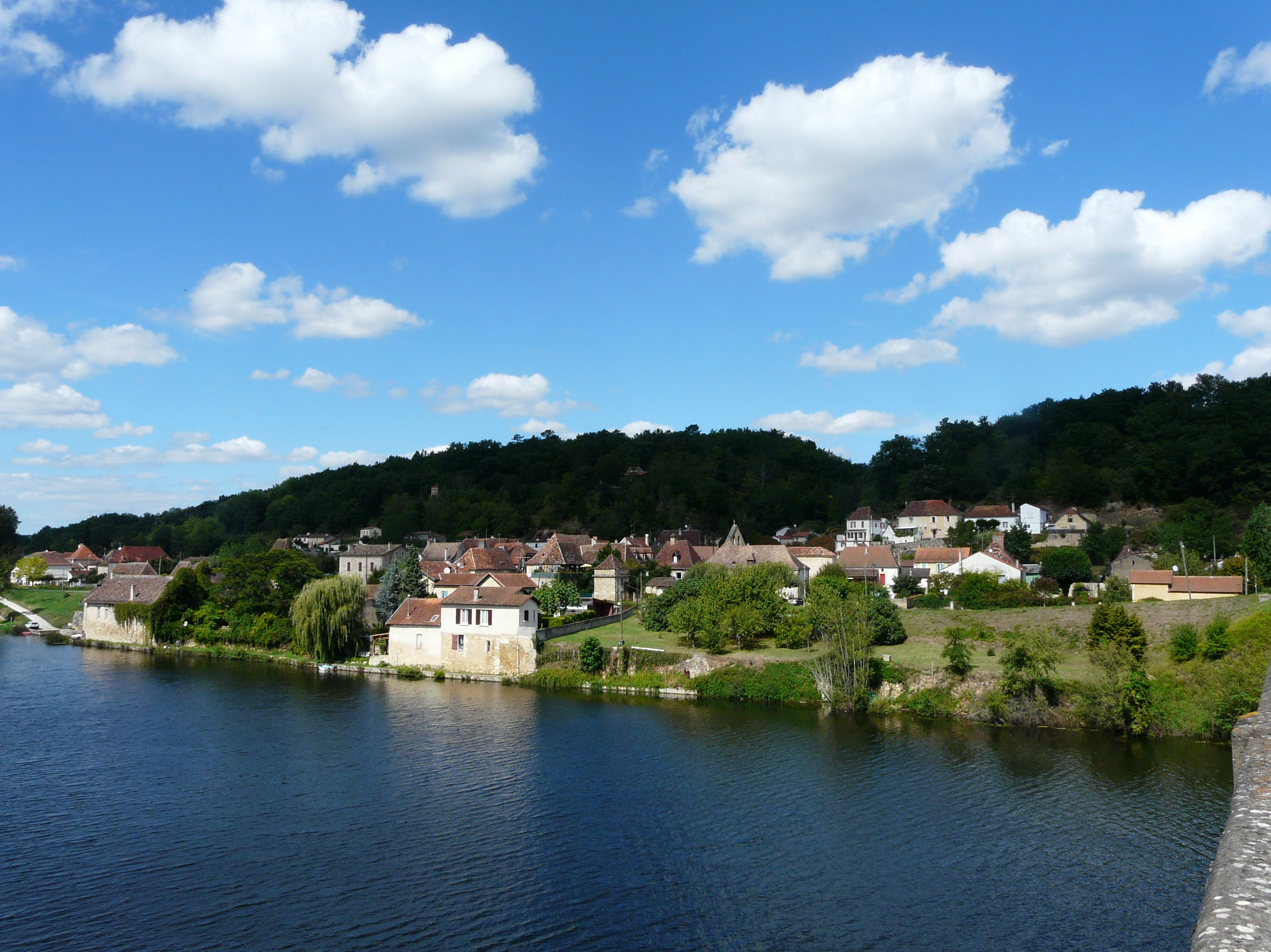
- A general view of Saint-Capraise-de-Lalinde

- Coat of arms
- Location of Saint-Capraise-de-Lalinde
- Location within France Location within Nouvelle-Aquitaine
- Coordinates: 44°50′35″N 0°39′16″E
- Country: France
- Region: Nouvelle-Aquitaine
- Department: Dordogne
- Arrondissement: Bergerac
- Canton: Lalinde

Government
  - Mayor (2020–2026): Laurent Péréa
- Area^{1}: 3.83 km^{2} (1.48 sq mi)
- Elevation: 40 m (130 ft)
- Highest elevation: 132 m (433 ft)
- Lowest elevation: 18 m (59 ft)
- Population (2023): 536
  - Density: 140/km^{2} (362/sq mi)
- Time zone: UTC+01:00 (CET)
  - Summer (DST): UTC+02:00 (CEST)
- INSEE/Postal code: 24382 /24150
- ^{1} French Land Register data, which excludes lakes, ponds, glaciers > 1 km^{2} (0.386 sq mi or 247 acres) and river estuaries.

Saint-Capraise-de-Lalinde (French pronunciation: [sɛ̃ kapʁɛz də lalɛ̃d], literally Saint-Capraise of Lalinde; Occitan: Sent Grapasi de La Linda) is a commune in the Dordogne department in Nouvelle-Aquitaine in southwestern France.

== Population ==
Historical population
Year	Pop.	±% p.a.
1968	485	—
1975	506	+0.61%
1982	555	+1.33%
1990	584	+0.64%
1999	531	−1.05%
2007	550	+0.44%
2012	523	−1.00%
2017	531	+0.30%
2023	536	+0.16%
Source: INSEE

== See also ==
- Communes of the Dordogne department
