= Saint-Agne =

- Commune
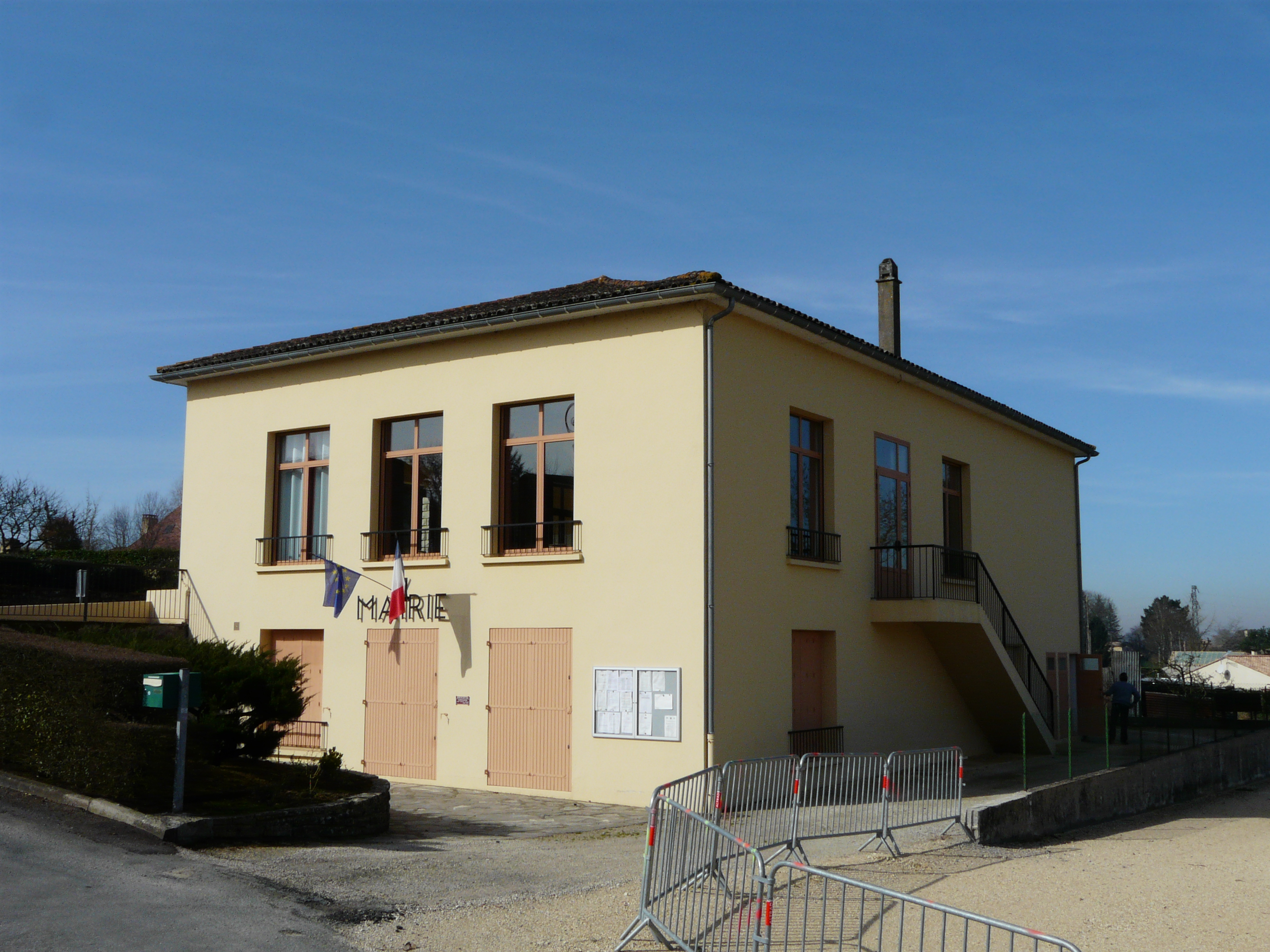
- The town hall in Saint-Agne

- Coat of arms
- Location of Saint-Agne
- Location within France Location within Nouvelle-Aquitaine
- Coordinates: 44°50′13″N 0°38′06″E
- Country: France
- Region: Nouvelle-Aquitaine
- Department: Dordogne
- Arrondissement: Bergerac
- Canton: Lalinde

Government
  - Mayor (2020–2026): Nelly Jobelot
- Area^{1}: 5.87 km^{2} (2.27 sq mi)
- Elevation: 47 m (154 ft)
- Highest elevation: 132 m (433 ft)
- Lowest elevation: 18 m (59 ft)
- Population (2023): 438
  - Density: 74.6/km^{2} (193/sq mi)
- Time zone: UTC+01:00 (CET)
  - Summer (DST): UTC+02:00 (CEST)
- INSEE/Postal code: 24361 /24520
- ^{1} French Land Register data, which excludes lakes, ponds, glaciers > 1 km^{2} (0.386 sq mi or 247 acres) and river estuaries.

Saint-Agne (French pronunciation: [sɛ̃.t‿aɲ]; Occitan: Sent Anha) is a commune in the Dordogne department in Nouvelle-Aquitaine in southwestern France.

== Population ==
Historical population
Year	Pop.	±% p.a.
1968	254	—
1975	251	−0.17%
1982	258	+0.39%
1990	325	+2.93%
1999	357	+1.05%
2007	388	+1.05%
2012	420	+1.60%
2017	441	+0.98%
2023	438	−0.11%
Source: INSEE

== See also ==
- Communes of the Dordogne department
