= Saint-Marcel-du-Périgord =

- Commune
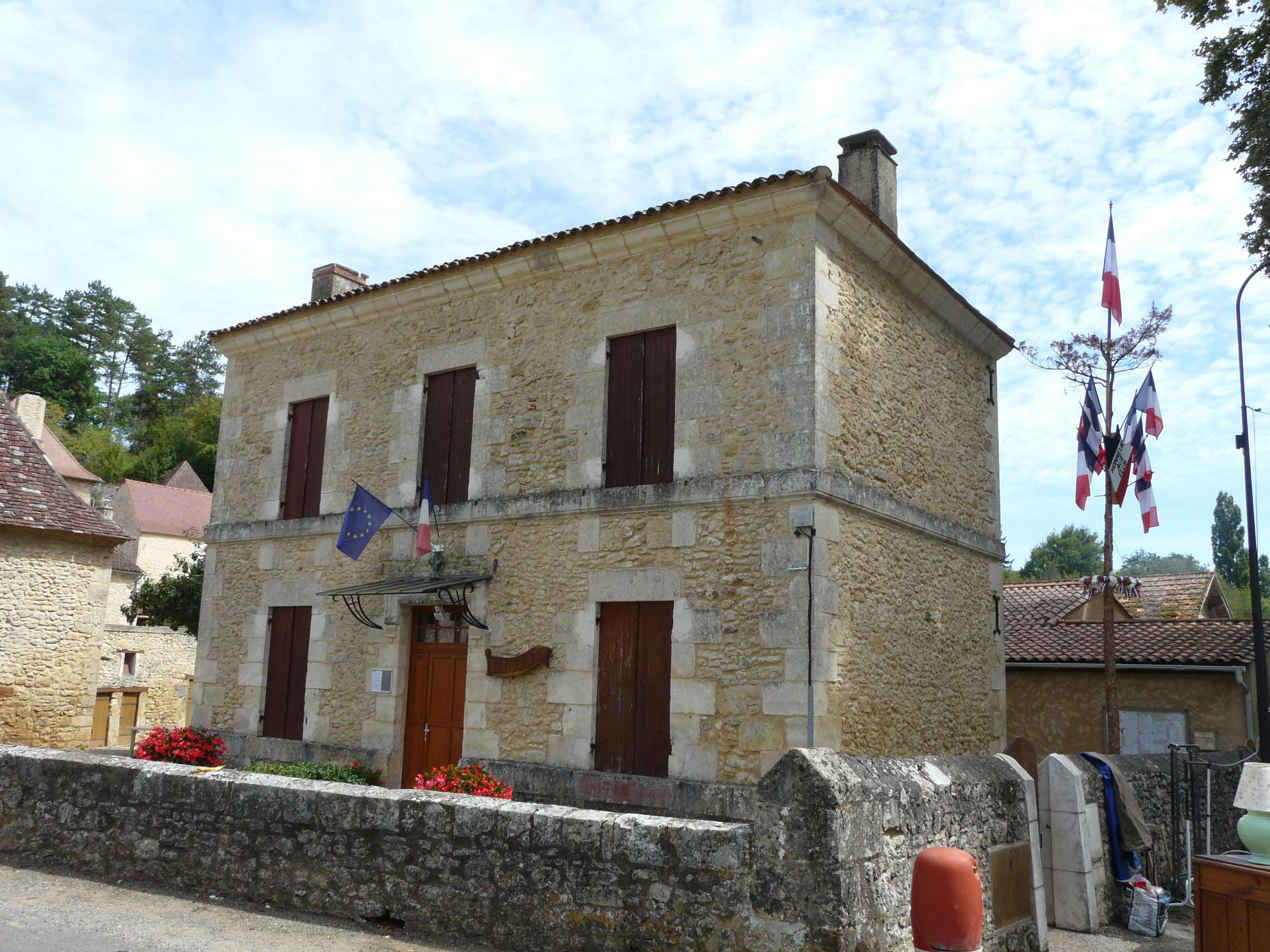
- The town hall in Saint-Marcel-du-Périgord

- Coat of arms
- Location of Saint-Marcel-du-Périgord
- Location within France Location within Nouvelle-Aquitaine
- Coordinates: 44°54′59″N 0°42′47″E
- Country: France
- Region: Nouvelle-Aquitaine
- Department: Dordogne
- Arrondissement: Bergerac
- Canton: Lalinde

Government
  - Mayor (2020–2026): Yves Wrobel
- Area^{1}: 11.46 km^{2} (4.42 sq mi)
- Highest elevation: 195 m (640 ft)
- Lowest elevation: 81 m (266 ft)
- Population (2023): 137
  - Density: 12.0/km^{2} (31.0/sq mi)
- Time zone: UTC+01:00 (CET)
  - Summer (DST): UTC+02:00 (CEST)
- INSEE/Postal code: 24445 /24510
- ^{1} French Land Register data, which excludes lakes, ponds, glaciers > 1 km^{2} (0.386 sq mi or 247 acres) and river estuaries.

Saint-Marcel-du-Périgord (French pronunciation: [sɛ̃ maʁsɛl dy peʁiɡɔʁ], literally Saint-Marcel of the Périgord; Occitan: Sent Marcèl de Perigòrd) is a commune in the Dordogne department in Nouvelle-Aquitaine in southwestern France.

== Population ==
Historical population
Year	Pop.	±% p.a.
1968	153	—
1975	134	−1.88%
1982	123	−1.22%
1990	140	+1.63%
1999	141	+0.08%
2007	141	+0.00%
2012	155	+1.91%
2017	147	−1.05%
2023	137	−1.17%
Source: INSEE

== See also ==
- Communes of the Dordogne department
