= Rampieux =

- Commune
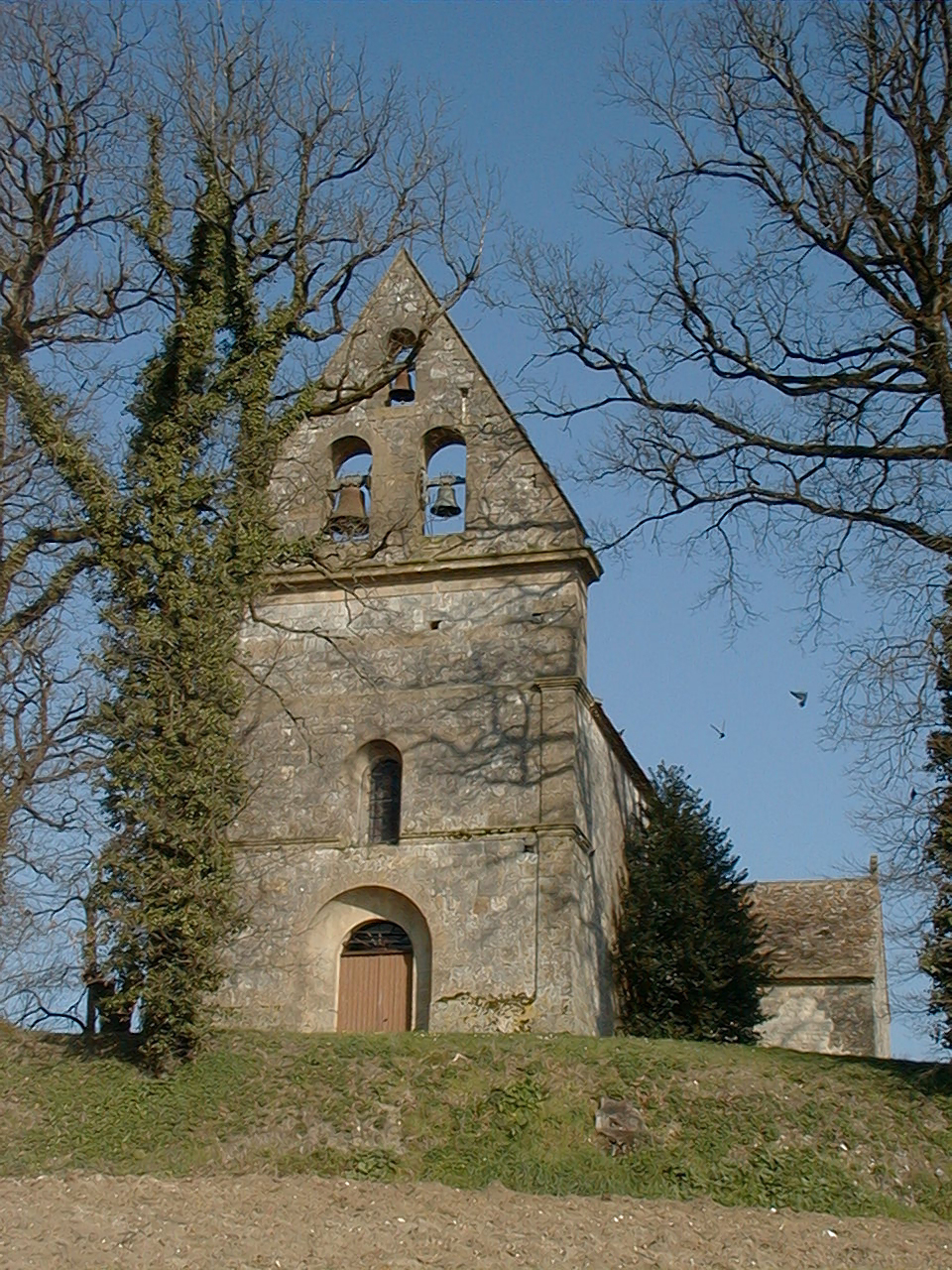
- The church in Rampieux
- Location of Rampieux
- Location within France Location within Nouvelle-Aquitaine
- Coordinates: 44°42′55″N 0°47′51″E
- Country: France
- Region: Nouvelle-Aquitaine
- Department: Dordogne
- Arrondissement: Bergerac
- Canton: Lalinde

Government
  - Mayor (2020–2026): Daniel Grimal
- Area^{1}: 11.82 km^{2} (4.56 sq mi)
- Elevation: 222 m (728 ft)
- Highest elevation: 232 m (761 ft)
- Lowest elevation: 114 m (374 ft)
- Population (2023): 139
  - Density: 11.8/km^{2} (30.5/sq mi)
- Time zone: UTC+01:00 (CET)
  - Summer (DST): UTC+02:00 (CEST)
- INSEE/Postal code: 24347 /24440
- ^{1} French Land Register data, which excludes lakes, ponds, glaciers > 1 km^{2} (0.386 sq mi or 247 acres) and river estuaries.

Rampieux (French pronunciation: [ʁɑ̃pjø]; Occitan: Rampiu) is a commune in the Dordogne department in Nouvelle-Aquitaine in southwestern France.

== Population ==
Historical population
Year	Pop.	±% p.a.
1968	168	—
1975	154	−1.24%
1982	155	+0.09%
1990	155	+0.00%
1999	162	+0.49%
2007	152	−0.79%
2012	139	−1.77%
2017	150	+1.53%
2023	139	−1.26%
Source: INSEE

== See also ==
- Communes of the Dordogne department
