= Pressignac-Vicq =

- Commune
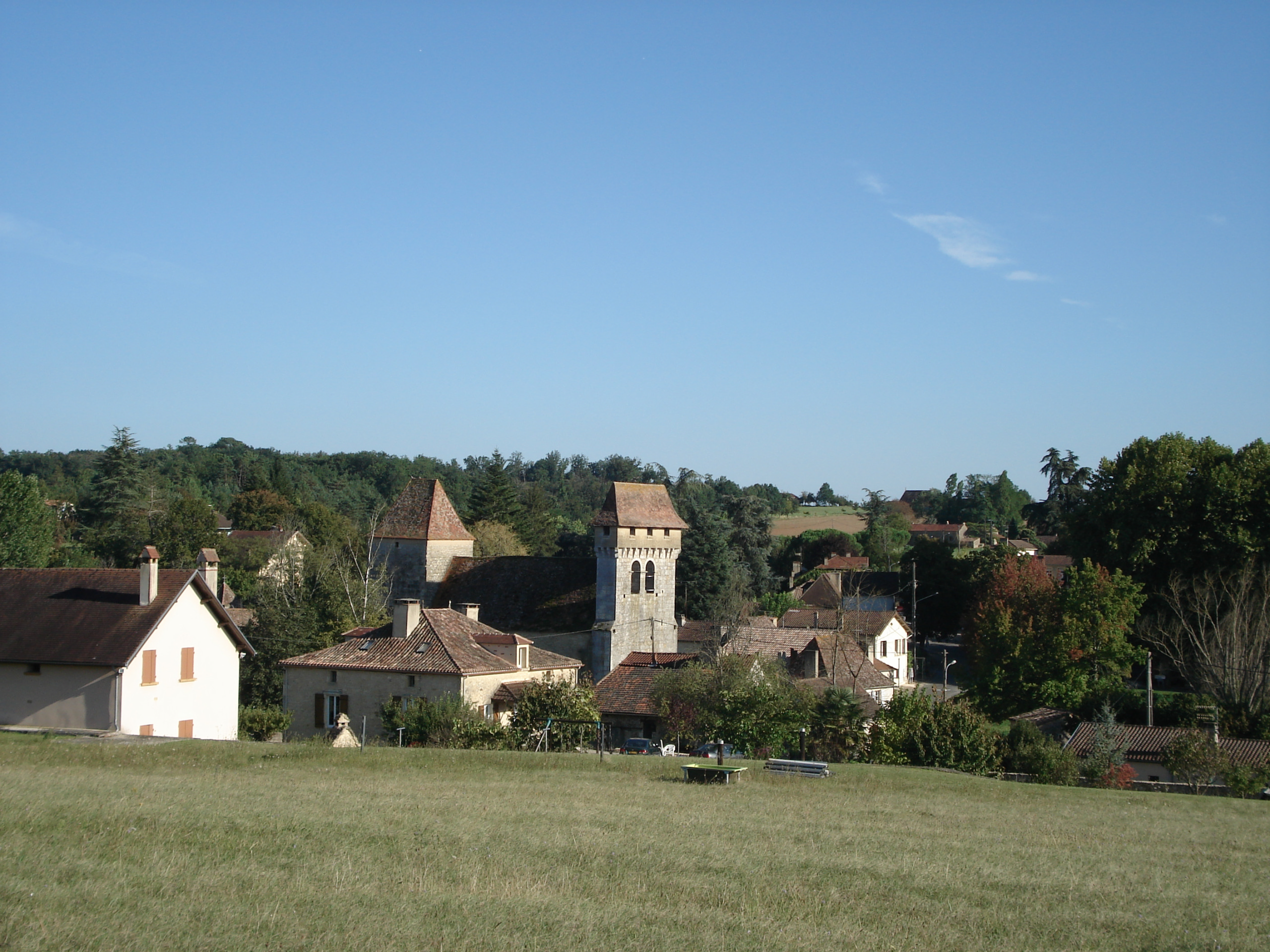
- A general view of Pressignac-Vicq

- Coat of arms
- Location of Pressignac-Vicq
- Location within France Location within Nouvelle-Aquitaine
- Coordinates: 44°53′46″N 0°43′21″E
- Country: France
- Region: Nouvelle-Aquitaine
- Department: Dordogne
- Arrondissement: Bergerac
- Canton: Lalinde

Government
  - Mayor (2020–2026): Benoît Bourla
- Area^{1}: 17.06 km^{2} (6.59 sq mi)
- Elevation: 140 m (460 ft)
- Highest elevation: 206 m (676 ft)
- Lowest elevation: 100 m (330 ft)
- Population (2023): 456
  - Density: 26.7/km^{2} (69.2/sq mi)
- Time zone: UTC+01:00 (CET)
  - Summer (DST): UTC+02:00 (CEST)
- INSEE/Postal code: 24338 /24150
- ^{1} French Land Register data, which excludes lakes, ponds, glaciers > 1 km^{2} (0.386 sq mi or 247 acres) and river estuaries.

Pressignac-Vicq (French pronunciation: [pʁɛsiɲak vik]; Occitan: Pressinhac e Vic) is a commune in the Dordogne department in Nouvelle-Aquitaine in southwestern France.

== Population ==
Historical population
Year	Pop.	±% p.a.
1968	341	—
1975	341	+0.00%
1982	349	+0.33%
1990	385	+1.23%
1999	448	+1.70%
2007	451	+0.08%
2012	481	+1.30%
2017	432	−2.13%
2023	456	+0.91%
Source: INSEE

== See also ==
- Communes of the Dordogne department
