= Pontours =

- Commune
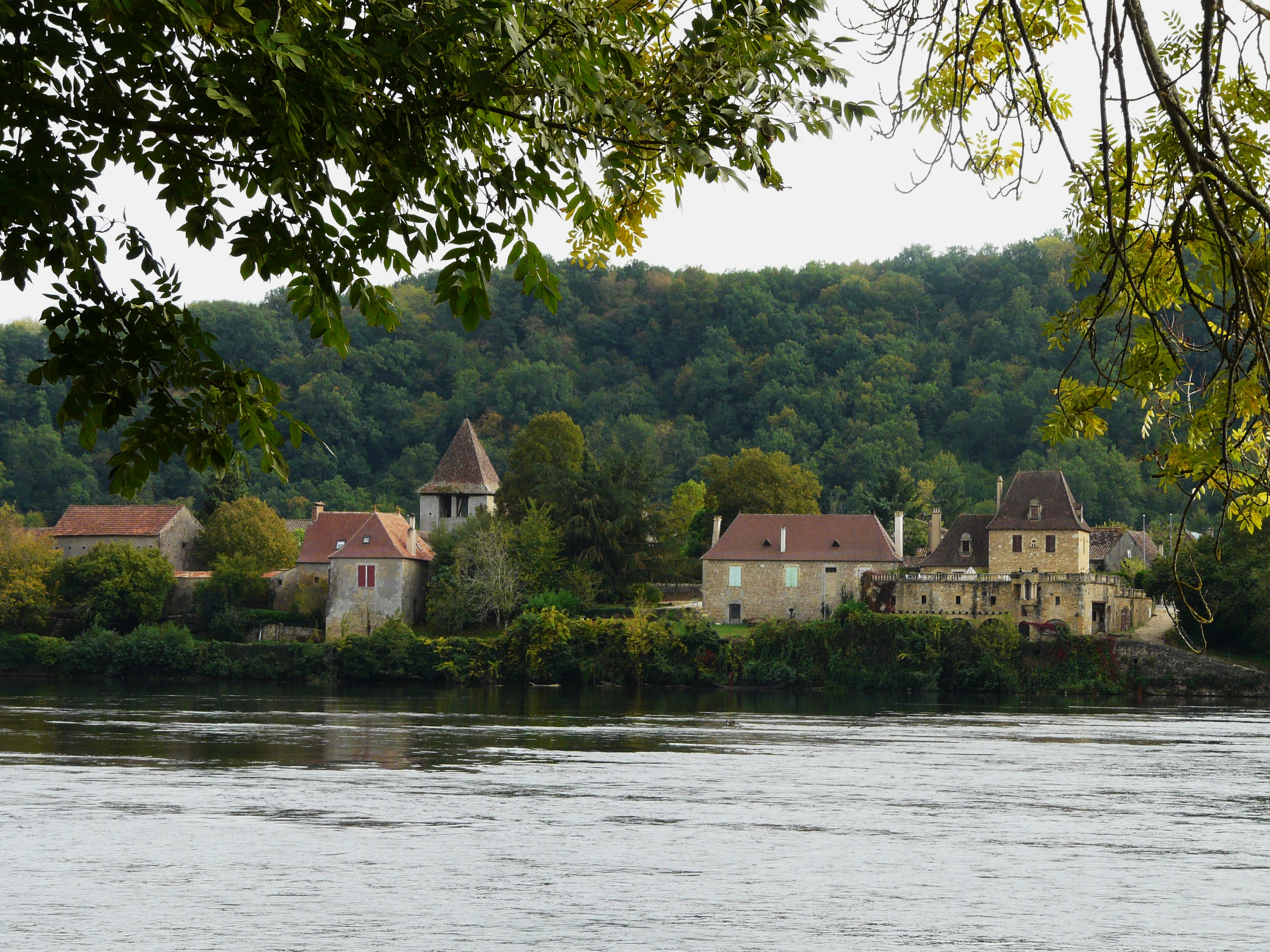
- Dordogne (river)

- Coat of arms
- Location of Pontours
- Location within France Location within Nouvelle-Aquitaine
- Coordinates: 44°50′13″N 0°45′46″E
- Country: France
- Region: Nouvelle-Aquitaine
- Department: Dordogne
- Arrondissement: Bergerac
- Canton: Lalinde

Government
  - Mayor (2020–2026): Étienne Gouyou-Beauchamps
- Area^{1}: 6.69 km^{2} (2.58 sq mi)
- Elevation: 44 m (144 ft)
- Highest elevation: 175 m (574 ft)
- Lowest elevation: 36 m (118 ft)
- Population (2023): 209
  - Density: 31.2/km^{2} (80.9/sq mi)
- Time zone: UTC+01:00 (CET)
  - Summer (DST): UTC+02:00 (CEST)
- INSEE/Postal code: 24334 /24150
- ^{1} French Land Register data, which excludes lakes, ponds, glaciers > 1 km^{2} (0.386 sq mi or 247 acres) and river estuaries.

Pontours is a commune in the Dordogne department in Nouvelle-Aquitaine in southwestern France.

== Population ==
Historical population
Year	Pop.	±% p.a.
1968	163	—
1975	153	−0.90%
1982	164	+1.00%
1990	187	+1.65%
1999	168	−1.18%
2007	196	+1.95%
2012	216	+1.96%
2017	191	−2.43%
2023	209	+1.51%
Source: INSEE

== See also ==
- Communes of the Dordogne department
