= Varennes, Dordogne =

Varennes
- Commune
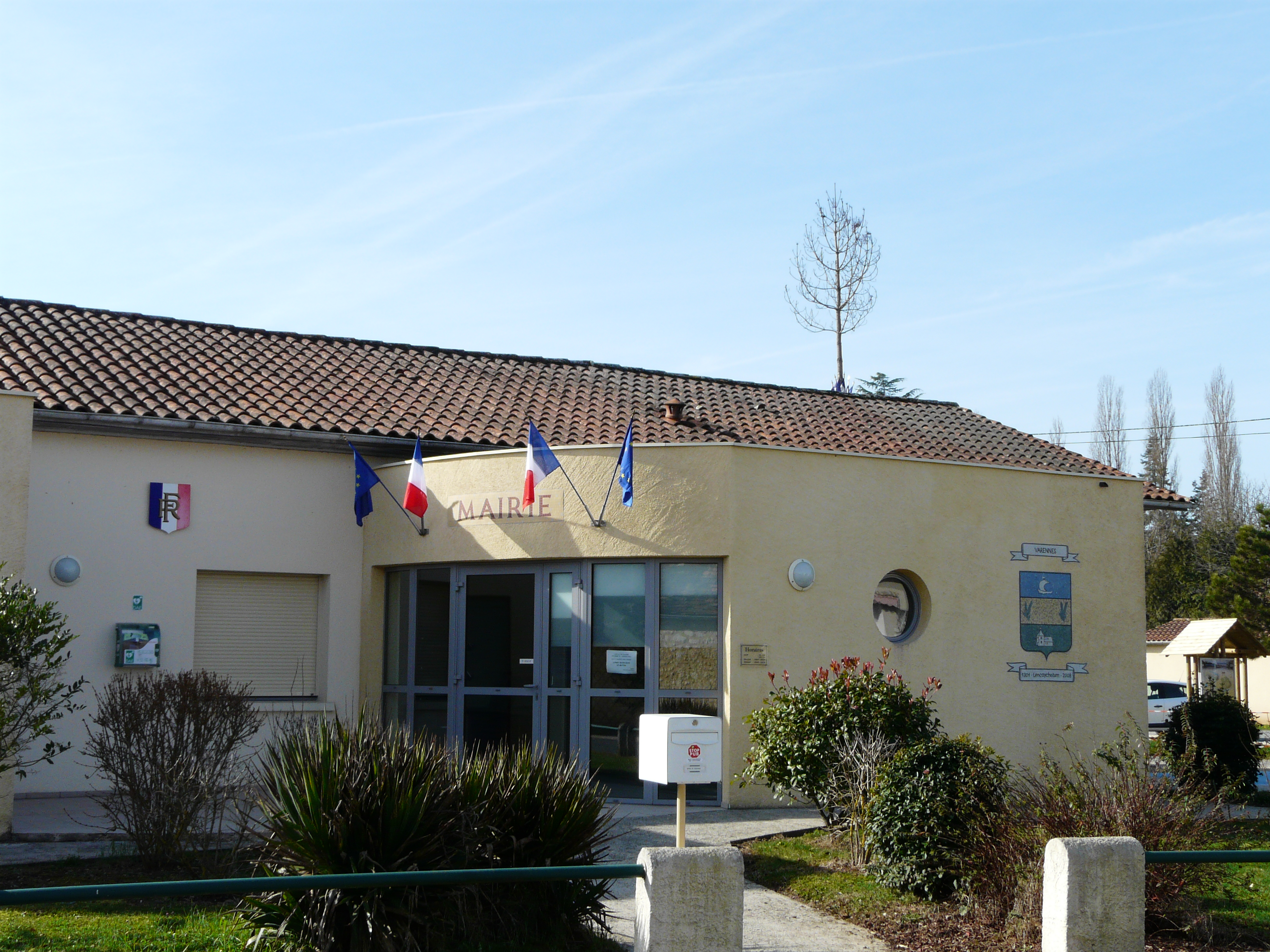
- The town hall in Varennes

- Coat of arms
- Location of Varennes
- Location within France Location within Nouvelle-Aquitaine
- Coordinates: 44°49′58″N 0°40′48″E
- Country: France
- Region: Nouvelle-Aquitaine
- Department: Dordogne
- Arrondissement: Bergerac
- Canton: Lalinde

Government
  - Mayor (2020–2026): Gérard Martin
- Area^{1}: 4.05 km^{2} (1.56 sq mi)
- Elevation: 50 m (160 ft)
- Highest elevation: 103 m (338 ft)
- Lowest elevation: 27 m (89 ft)
- Population (2023): 458
  - Density: 113/km^{2} (293/sq mi)
- Time zone: UTC+01:00 (CET)
  - Summer (DST): UTC+02:00 (CEST)
- INSEE/Postal code: 24566 /24150
- ^{1} French Land Register data, which excludes lakes, ponds, glaciers > 1 km^{2} (0.386 sq mi or 247 acres) and river estuaries.

Varennes (French pronunciation: [vaʁɛn]; Occitan: Varenas) is a commune in the Dordogne department in Nouvelle-Aquitaine in southwestern France.

== Population ==
Historical population
Year	Pop.	±% p.a.
1968	383	—
1975	483	+3.37%
1982	424	−1.84%
1990	377	−1.46%
1999	384	+0.20%
2007	449	+1.97%
2012	447	−0.09%
2017	467	+0.88%
2023	458	−0.32%
Source: INSEE

== See also ==
- Communes of the Dordogne department
