= Capdrot =

Commune in Nouvelle-Aquitaine, France

- Commune
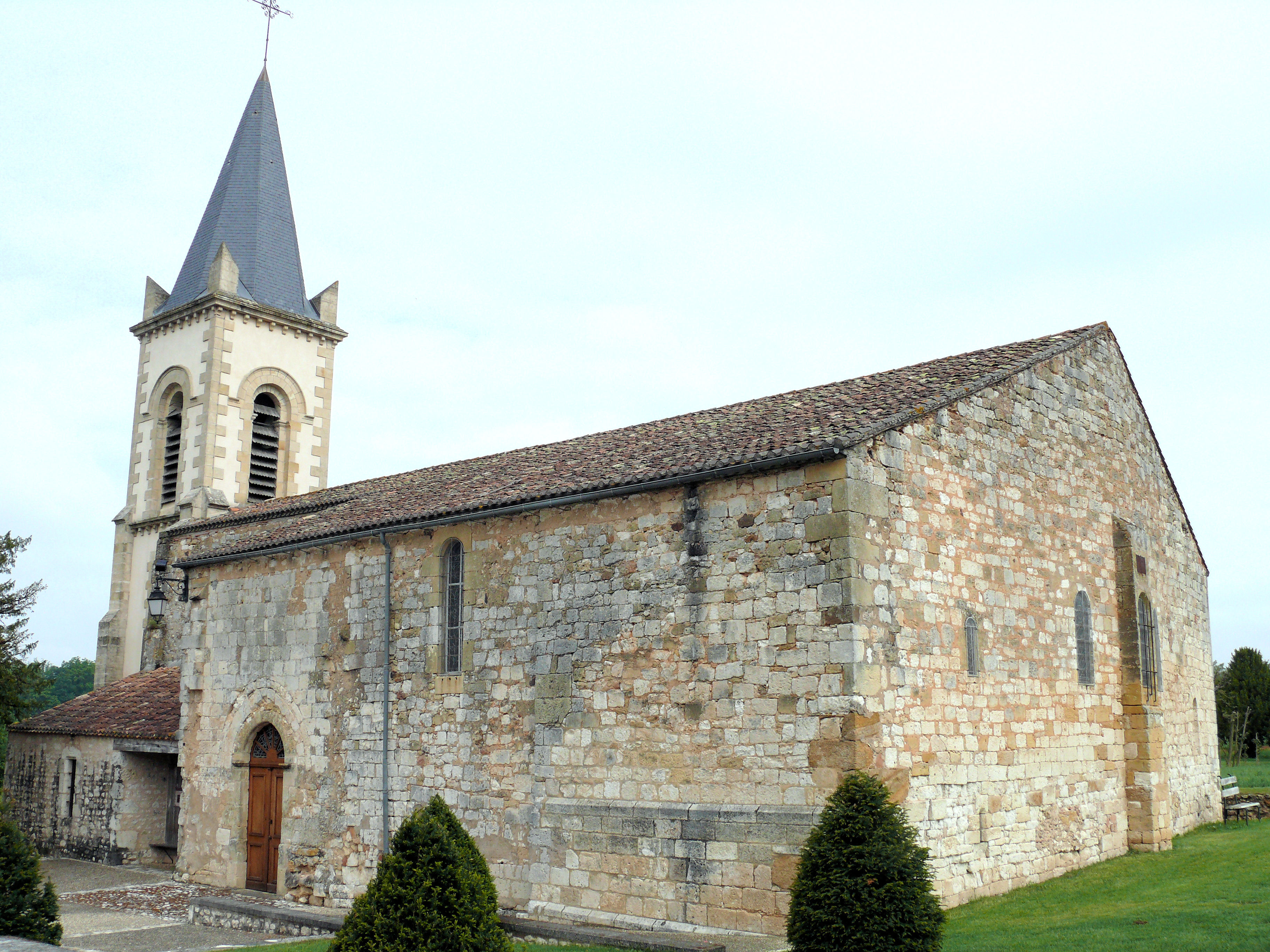
- The church in Capdrot
- Location of Capdrot
- Location within France Location within Nouvelle-Aquitaine
- Coordinates: 44°40′56″N 0°55′25″E
- Country: France
- Region: Nouvelle-Aquitaine
- Department: Dordogne
- Arrondissement: Bergerac
- Canton: Lalinde

Government
  - Mayor (2020–2026): Ludovic Papon
- Area^{1}: 43.72 km^{2} (16.88 sq mi)
- Elevation: 150 m (490 ft)
- Highest elevation: 288 m (945 ft)
- Lowest elevation: 143 m (469 ft)
- Population (2023): 458
  - Density: 10.5/km^{2} (27.1/sq mi)
- Time zone: UTC+01:00 (CET)
  - Summer (DST): UTC+02:00 (CEST)
- INSEE/Postal code: 24080 /24540
- ^{1} French Land Register data, which excludes lakes, ponds, glaciers > 1 km^{2} (0.386 sq mi or 247 acres) and river estuaries.

Capdrot (French pronunciation: [kapdʁo]; Occitan: Capdròt) is a commune in the Dordogne department in Nouvelle-Aquitaine in southwestern France.

== Population ==
Historical population
| Year | Pop. | ±% p.a. |
|---|---|---|
| 1968 | 435 | — |
| 1975 | 469 | +1.08% |
| 1982 | 467 | −0.06% |
| 1990 | 502 | +0.91% |
| 1999 | 507 | +0.11% |
| 2007 | 483 | −0.60% |
| 2012 | 509 | +1.05% |
| 2017 | 502 | −0.28% |
| 2023 | 458 | −1.52% |
Source: INSEE

== See also ==
- Communes of the Dordogne department
