= Sainte-Foy-de-Longas =

- Commune
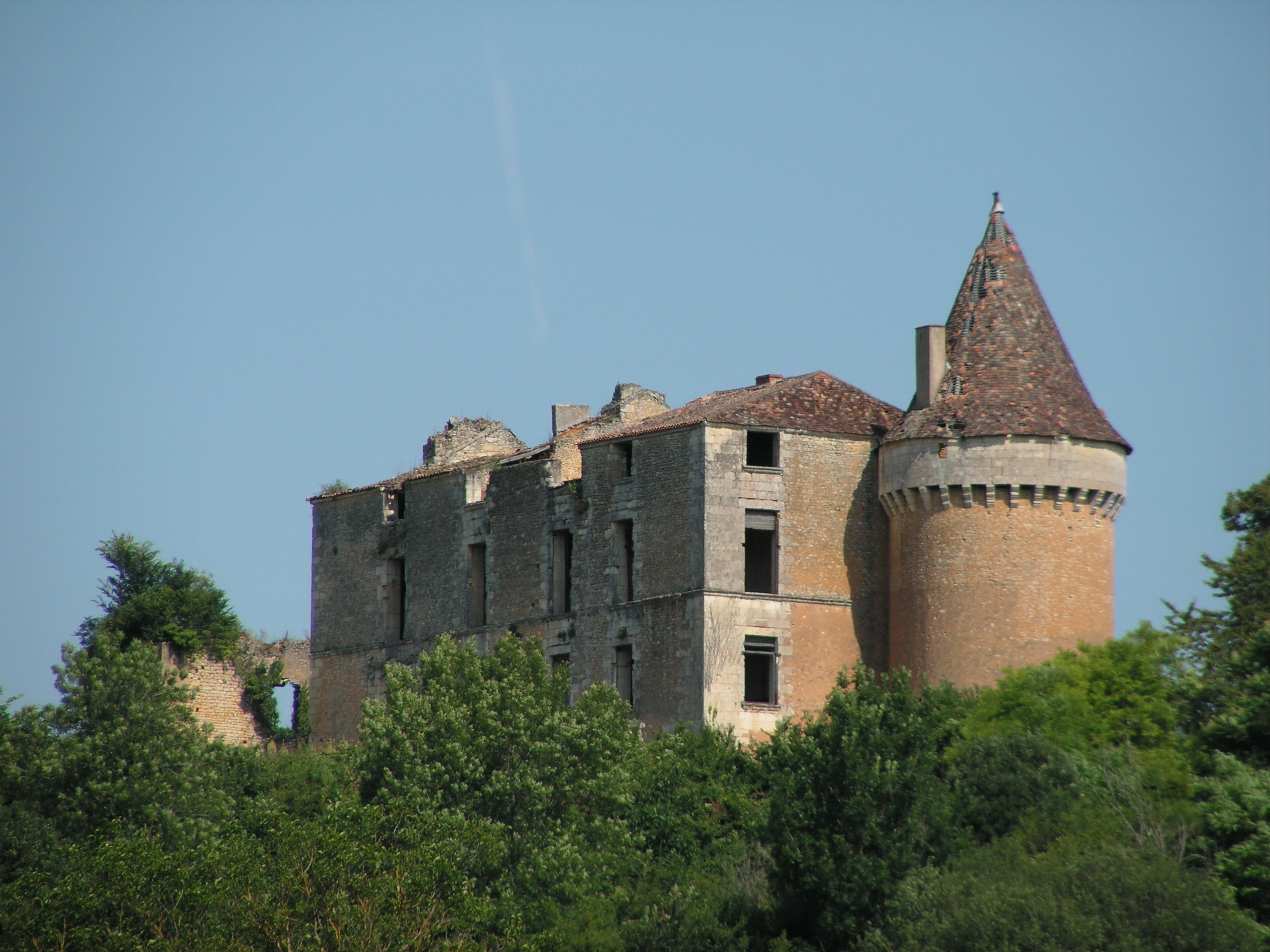
- Chateau of Longas

- Coat of arms
- Location of Sainte-Foy-de-Longas
- Location within France Location within Nouvelle-Aquitaine
- Coordinates: 44°55′34″N 0°45′05″E
- Country: France
- Region: Nouvelle-Aquitaine
- Department: Dordogne
- Arrondissement: Bergerac
- Canton: Lalinde

Government
  - Mayor (2020–2026): Thierry Lascaux
- Area^{1}: 16.18 km^{2} (6.25 sq mi)
- Elevation: 134 m (440 ft)
- Highest elevation: 219 m (719 ft)
- Lowest elevation: 110 m (360 ft)
- Population (2023): 242
  - Density: 15.0/km^{2} (38.7/sq mi)
- Time zone: UTC+01:00 (CET)
  - Summer (DST): UTC+02:00 (CEST)
- INSEE/Postal code: 24407 /24510
- ^{1} French Land Register data, which excludes lakes, ponds, glaciers > 1 km^{2} (0.386 sq mi or 247 acres) and river estuaries.

Sainte-Foy-de-Longas (Occitan: Sant Feu de Longas) is a commune in the Dordogne department in Nouvelle-Aquitaine in southwestern France.

== Population ==
Historical population
Year	Pop.	±% p.a.
1968	255	—
1975	241	−0.80%
1982	259	+1.03%
1990	250	−0.44%
1999	249	−0.04%
2007	242	−0.36%
2012	241	−0.08%
2017	237	−0.33%
2023	242	+0.35%
Source: INSEE

== See also ==
- Communes of the Dordogne department
