= Bourniquel =

- Commune
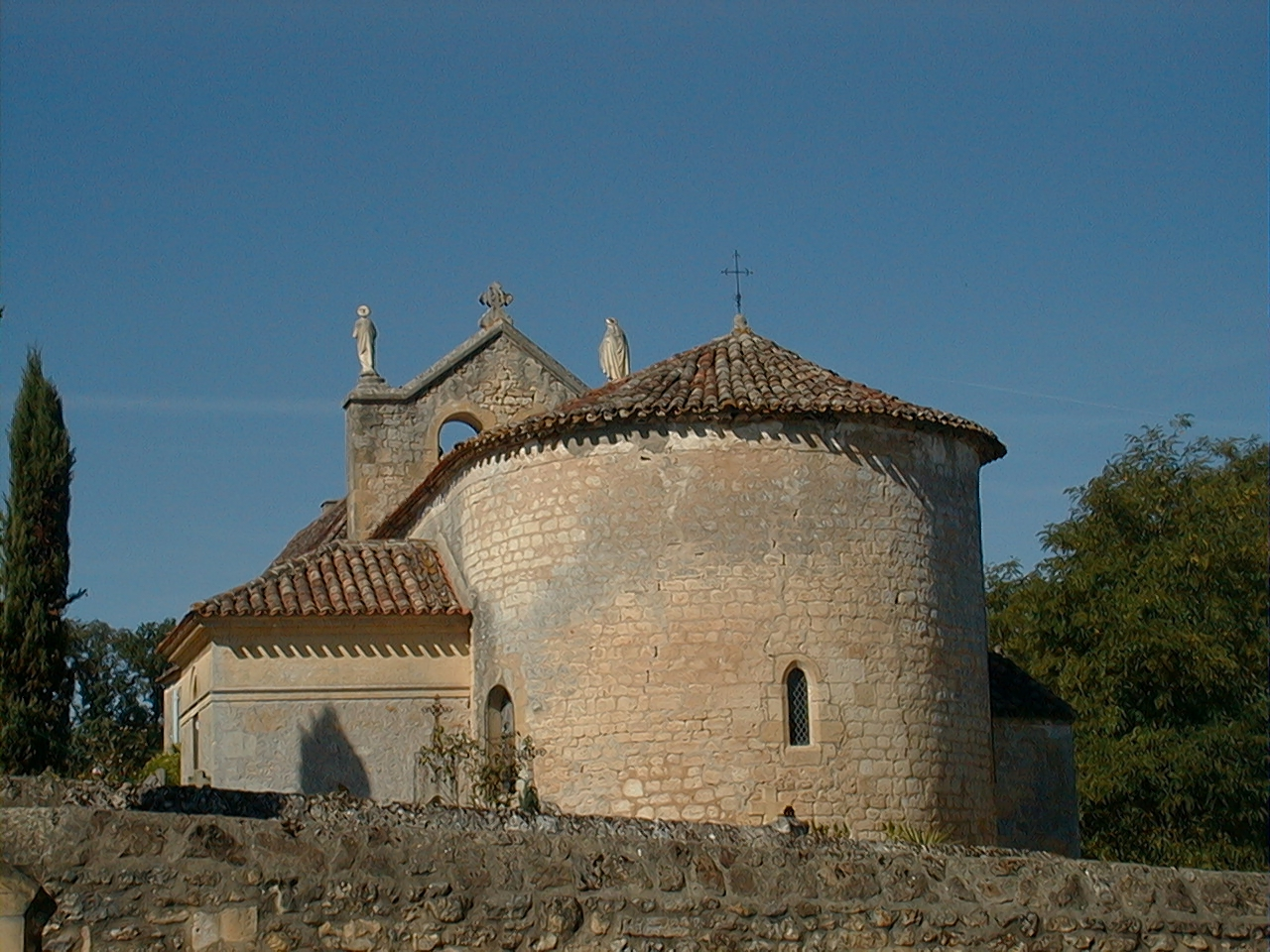
- The church in Bourniquel
- Location of Bourniquel
- Location within France Location within Nouvelle-Aquitaine
- Coordinates: 44°48′37″N 0°46′32″E
- Country: France
- Region: Nouvelle-Aquitaine
- Department: Dordogne
- Arrondissement: Bergerac
- Canton: Lalinde

Government
  - Mayor (2020–2026): Raymond Fleury
- Area^{1}: 8.96 km^{2} (3.46 sq mi)
- Elevation: 161 m (528 ft)
- Highest elevation: 171 m (561 ft)
- Lowest elevation: 55 m (180 ft)
- Population (2023): 62
  - Density: 6.9/km^{2} (18/sq mi)
- Time zone: UTC+01:00 (CET)
  - Summer (DST): UTC+02:00 (CEST)
- INSEE/Postal code: 24060 /24150
- ^{1} French Land Register data, which excludes lakes, ponds, glaciers > 1 km^{2} (0.386 sq mi or 247 acres) and river estuaries.

Bourniquel (French pronunciation: [buʁnikɛl]; Occitan: Borniquèl) is a commune in the Dordogne department in southwestern France.

== Population ==
Historical population
| Year | Pop. | ±% p.a. |
|---|---|---|
| 1968 | 62 | — |
| 1975 | 88 | +5.13% |
| 1982 | 78 | −1.71% |
| 1990 | 52 | −4.94% |
| 1999 | 61 | +1.79% |
| 2007 | 64 | +0.60% |
| 2012 | 66 | +0.62% |
| 2017 | 69 | +0.89% |
| 2023 | 62 | −1.77% |
Source: INSEE

== See also ==
- Communes of the Dordogne département
