= Alles-sur-Dordogne =

- Commune
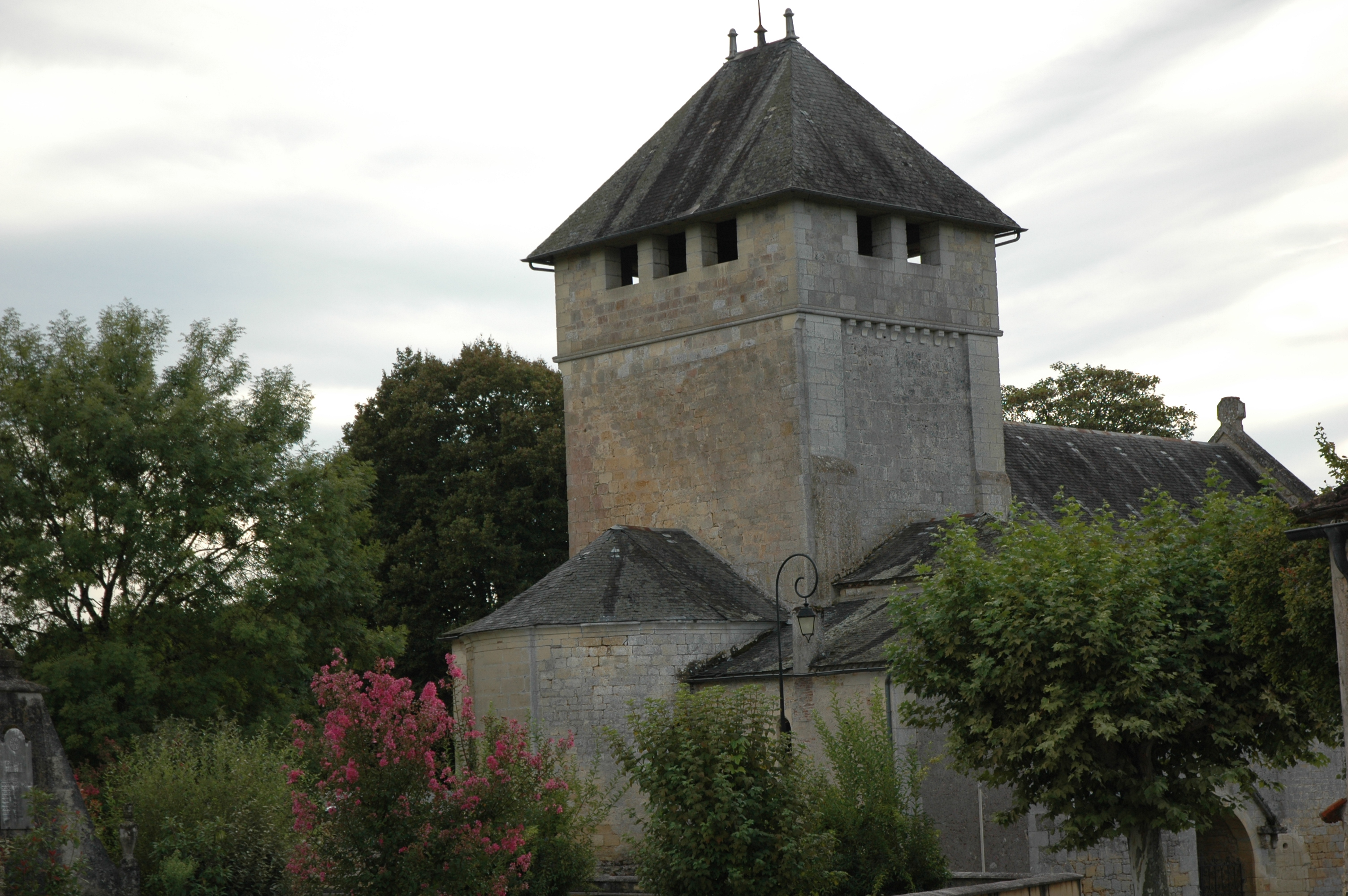
- The church in Alles-sur-Dordogne

- Coat of arms
- Location of Alles-sur-Dordogne
- Location within France Location within Nouvelle-Aquitaine
- Coordinates: 44°51′34″N 0°52′07″E
- Country: France
- Region: Nouvelle-Aquitaine
- Department: Dordogne
- Arrondissement: Bergerac
- Canton: Lalinde

Government
  - Mayor (2022–2026): Sylvie Roque
- Area^{1}: 9.41 km^{2} (3.63 sq mi)
- Elevation: 57 m (187 ft)
- Highest elevation: 198 m (650 ft)
- Lowest elevation: 41 m (135 ft)
- Population (2023): 380
  - Density: 40/km^{2} (100/sq mi)
- Time zone: UTC+01:00 (CET)
  - Summer (DST): UTC+02:00 (CEST)
- INSEE/Postal code: 24005 /24480
- ^{1} French Land Register data, which excludes lakes, ponds, glaciers > 1 km^{2} (0.386 sq mi or 247 acres) and river estuaries.

Alles-sur-Dordogne (French pronunciation: [al syʁ dɔʁdɔɲ], literally Alles on Dordogne; Occitan: Àlans sus Dordonha) is a commune in the Dordogne department in Nouvelle-Aquitaine in southwestern France. It is situated on the river Dordogne.

== Population ==
Historical population
Year	Pop.	±% p.a.
1968	307	—
1975	293	−0.66%
1982	305	+0.58%
1990	302	−0.12%
1999	321	+0.68%
2007	335	+0.54%
2012	362	+1.56%
2017	385	+1.24%
2023	380	−0.22%
Source: INSEE

== History ==
In 1933, the commune of Alles was renamed Alles-sur-Dordogne.

== See also ==
- Communes of the Dordogne département
