= Verdon, Dordogne =

Verdon
- Commune
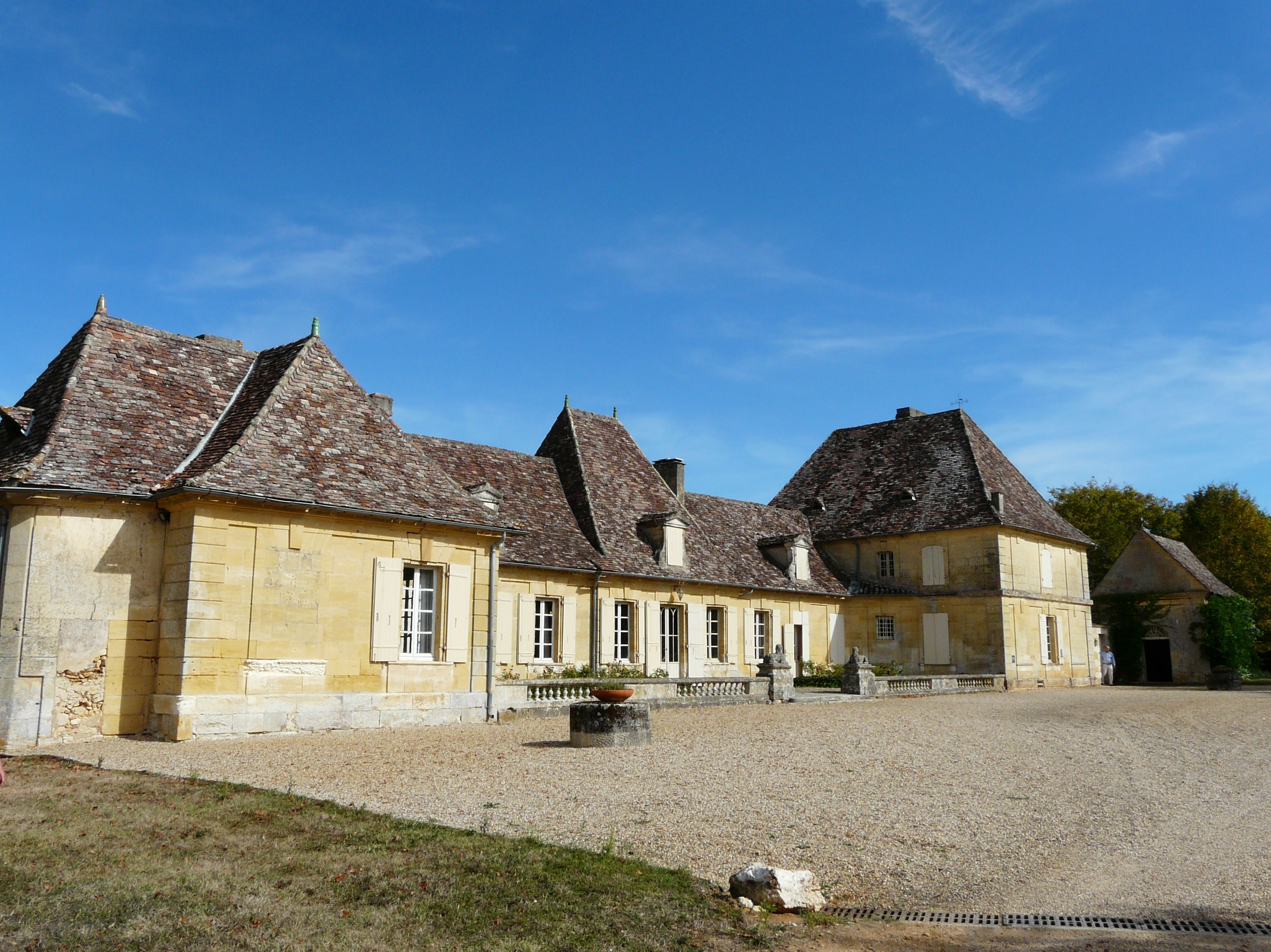
- The Montbrun chateau in Verdon
- Location of Verdon
- Location within France Location within Nouvelle-Aquitaine
- Coordinates: 44°48′41″N 0°37′54″E
- Country: France
- Region: Nouvelle-Aquitaine
- Department: Dordogne
- Arrondissement: Bergerac
- Canton: Lalinde
- Intercommunality: Bastides Dordogne-Périgord

Government
  - Mayor (2020–2026): Jean-Marie Brunat
- Area^{1}: 4.95 km^{2} (1.91 sq mi)
- Elevation: 117 m (384 ft)
- Highest elevation: 172 m (564 ft)
- Lowest elevation: 58 m (190 ft)
- Population (2023): 35
  - Density: 7.1/km^{2} (18/sq mi)
- Time zone: UTC+01:00 (CET)
  - Summer (DST): UTC+02:00 (CEST)
- INSEE/Postal code: 24570 /24520
- ^{1} French Land Register data, which excludes lakes, ponds, glaciers > 1 km^{2} (0.386 sq mi or 247 acres) and river estuaries.

Verdon (French pronunciation: [vɛʁdɔ̃]) is a commune in the Dordogne department in Nouvelle-Aquitaine in southwestern France.

== Population ==
Historical population
Year	Pop.	±% p.a.
1968	48	—
1975	48	+0.00%
1982	55	+1.96%
1990	38	−4.52%
1999	47	+2.39%
2007	57	+2.44%
2012	45	−4.62%
2017	47	+0.87%
2023	35	−4.79%
Source: INSEE

== See also ==
- Communes of the Dordogne department
