= Saint-Félix-de-Villadeix =

- Commune
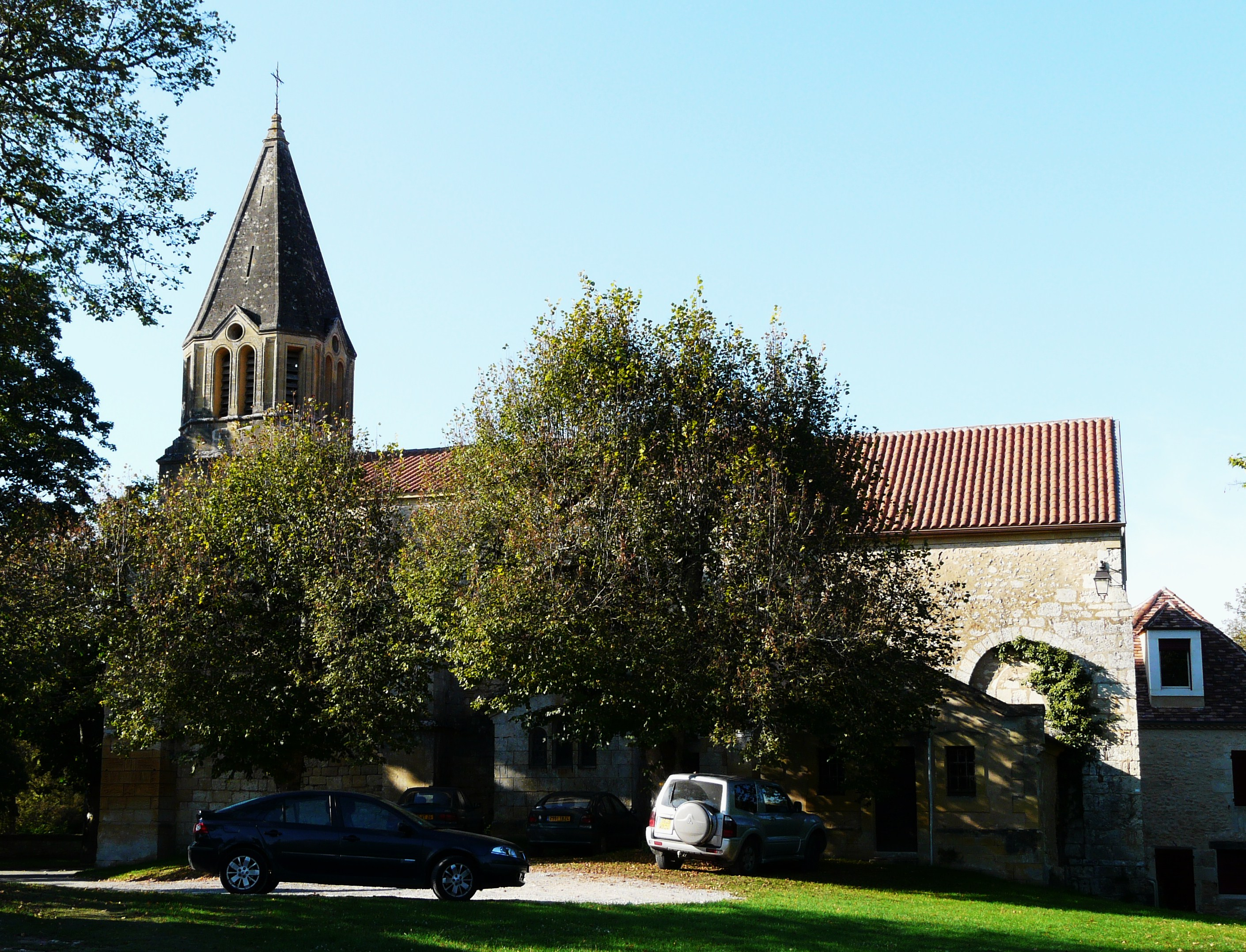
- The church in Saint-Félix-de-Villadeix

- Coat of arms
- Location of Saint-Félix-de-Villadeix
- Location within France Location within Nouvelle-Aquitaine
- Coordinates: 44°55′33″N 0°41′01″E
- Country: France
- Region: Nouvelle-Aquitaine
- Department: Dordogne
- Arrondissement: Bergerac
- Canton: Lalinde

Government
  - Mayor (2022–2026): Carole Alary
- Area^{1}: 16.88 km^{2} (6.52 sq mi)
- Elevation: 160 m (520 ft)
- Highest elevation: 210 m (690 ft)
- Lowest elevation: 80 m (260 ft)
- Population (2023): 314
  - Density: 18.6/km^{2} (48.2/sq mi)
- Time zone: UTC+01:00 (CET)
  - Summer (DST): UTC+02:00 (CEST)
- INSEE/Postal code: 24405 /24510
- ^{1} French Land Register data, which excludes lakes, ponds, glaciers > 1 km^{2} (0.386 sq mi or 247 acres) and river estuaries.

Saint-Félix-de-Villadeix (Limousin: Sent Feliç de Viladés) is a commune in the Dordogne department in Nouvelle-Aquitaine in southwestern France.

== Population ==
Historical population
Year	Pop.	±% p.a.
1968	233	—
1975	245	+0.72%
1982	266	+1.18%
1990	286	+0.91%
1999	286	+0.00%
2007	308	+0.93%
2012	298	−0.66%
2017	327	+1.87%
2023	314	−0.67%
Source: INSEE

== See also ==
- Communes of the Dordogne department
