= Lolme, Dordogne =

Lolme
- Commune
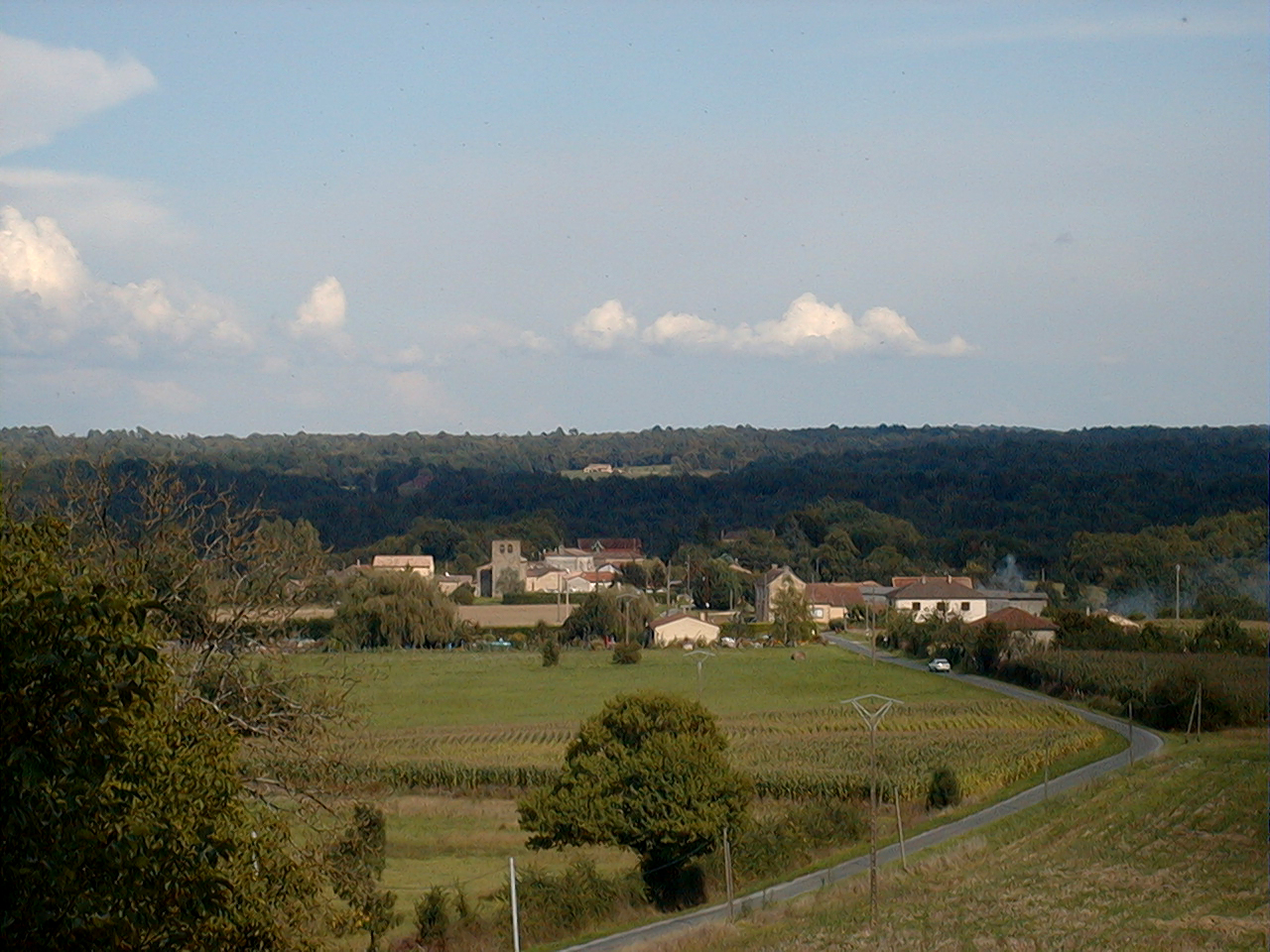
- A general view of Lolme

- Coat of arms
- Location of Lolme
- Location within France Location within Nouvelle-Aquitaine
- Coordinates: 44°42′45″N 0°50′43″E
- Country: France
- Region: Nouvelle-Aquitaine
- Department: Dordogne
- Arrondissement: Bergerac
- Canton: Lalinde

Government
  - Mayor (2020–2026): Bernard Étienne
- Area^{1}: 6.92 km^{2} (2.67 sq mi)
- Elevation: 160 m (520 ft)
- Highest elevation: 225 m (738 ft)
- Lowest elevation: 112 m (367 ft)
- Population (2023): 191
  - Density: 27.6/km^{2} (71.5/sq mi)
- Time zone: UTC+01:00 (CET)
  - Summer (DST): UTC+02:00 (CEST)
- INSEE/Postal code: 24244 /24540
- ^{1} French Land Register data, which excludes lakes, ponds, glaciers > 1 km^{2} (0.386 sq mi or 247 acres) and river estuaries.

Lolme (French pronunciation: [lɔlm]; Occitan: L'Orme) is a commune in the Dordogne department in Nouvelle-Aquitaine in southwestern France.

== Population ==
Historical population
Year	Pop.	±% p.a.
1968	104	—
1975	104	+0.00%
1982	110	+0.80%
1990	105	−0.58%
1999	111	+0.62%
2007	146	+3.49%
2012	218	+8.35%
2017	197	−2.01%
2023	191	−0.51%
Source: INSEE

== See also ==
- Communes of the Dordogne department
