= Saint-Cassien, Dordogne =

Saint-Cassien
- Commune
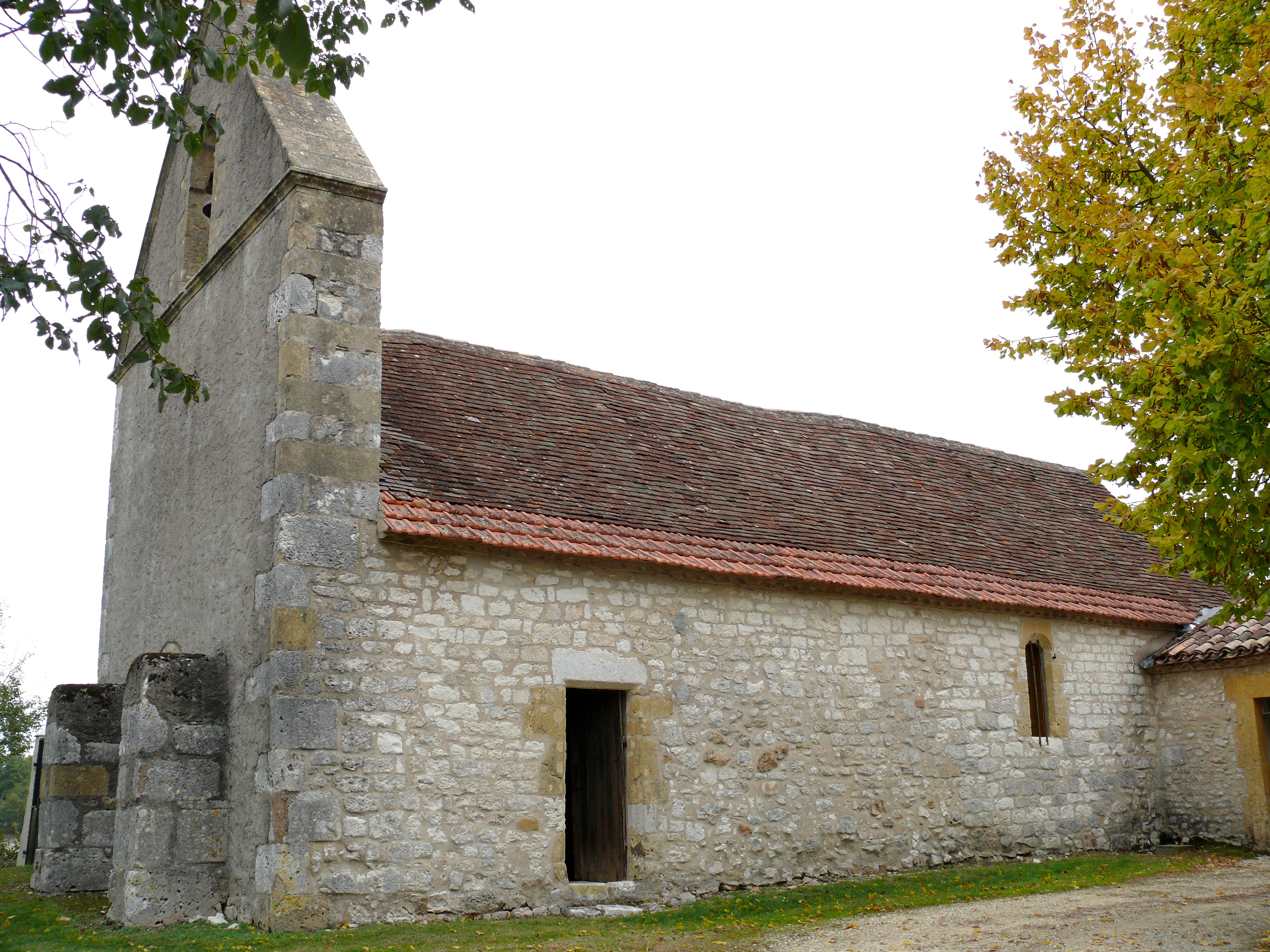
- The church in Saint-Cassien
- Location of Saint-Cassien
- Location within France Location within Nouvelle-Aquitaine
- Coordinates: 44°41′12″N 0°50′46″E
- Country: France
- Region: Nouvelle-Aquitaine
- Department: Dordogne
- Arrondissement: Bergerac
- Canton: Lalinde

Government
  - Mayor (2020–2026): Philippe Poumeau
- Area^{1}: 4.72 km^{2} (1.82 sq mi)
- Elevation: 175 m (574 ft)
- Highest elevation: 225 m (738 ft)
- Lowest elevation: 120 m (390 ft)
- Population (2023): 31
  - Density: 6.6/km^{2} (17/sq mi)
- Time zone: UTC+01:00 (CET)
  - Summer (DST): UTC+02:00 (CEST)
- INSEE/Postal code: 24384 /24540
- ^{1} French Land Register data, which excludes lakes, ponds, glaciers > 1 km^{2} (0.386 sq mi or 247 acres) and river estuaries.

Saint-Cassien (French pronunciation: [sɛ̃ kasjɛ̃]; Occitan: Sent Cassian) is a commune in the Dordogne department in Nouvelle-Aquitaine in southwestern France. Positioned near the Bergerac arrondissement. The population of Saint-Cassien is modest, with around 30-40 (34) residents as of 2021

== Population ==
Historical population
Year	Pop.	±% p.a.
1968	53	—
1975	43	−2.94%
1982	35	−2.90%
1990	40	+1.68%
1999	35	−1.47%
2007	33	−0.73%
2012	23	−6.97%
2017	34	+8.13%
2023	31	−1.53%
Source: INSEE

== See also ==
- Communes of the Dordogne department
