= Canton of Excideuil =

Coordinates: 45°20′N 1°05′E

Excideuil
- Former canton
- Interactive map of Excideuil
- Country: France
- Region: Nouvelle-Aquitaine
- Department: Dordogne
- No. of communes: {{{nbcomm}}}
- Disbanded: 2015
- Area: 185.91 km^{2} (71.78 sq mi)
- Population (2012): 5,666
  - Density: 30.48/km^{2} (78.94/sq mi)

The Canton of Excideuil is a former canton of the Dordogne département, in France. It was disbanded following the French canton reorganisation which came into effect in March 2015. It consisted of 14 communes, which joined the canton of Isle-Loue-Auvézère in 2015. It had 5,666 inhabitants (2012).

The lowest point is in Saint-Pantaly-d'Excideuil at 120 m, the highest point is in Saint-Mesmin at 415 m, the average elevation is 375 m. The most populated commune was Excideuil with 1,168 inhabitants (2012).

== Communes ==
The canton comprised the following communes:

- Anlhiac
- Clermont-d'Excideuil
- Excideuil
- Génis
- Preyssac-d'Excideuil
- Saint-Germain-des-Prés
- Saint-Jory-las-Bloux
- Saint-Martial-d'Albarède
- Saint-Médard-d'Excideuil
- Saint-Mesmin
- Saint-Pantaly-d'Excideuil
- Saint-Raphaël
- Sainte-Trie
- Salagnac

== Population history ==
Year	Population
1962	6,432
1968	6,951
1975	6,788
1982	6,271
1990	5,945
1999	5,677
2012	5,666

== See also ==
- Cantons of the Dordogne department
