= Canton of Lanouaille =

Coordinates: 45°25′N 1°08′E

Lanouaille
- Former canton
- Interactive map of Lanouaille
- Country: France
- Region: Nouvelle-Aquitaine
- Department: Dordogne
- No. of communes: {{{nbcomm}}}
- Disbanded: 2015
- Area: 253.07 km^{2} (97.71 sq mi)
- Population (2012): 5,419
  - Density: 21.41/km^{2} (55.46/sq mi)

The Canton of Lanouaille is a former canton of the Dordogne département, in France. It was disbanded following the French canton reorganisation which came into effect in March 2015. It had 5,419 inhabitants (2012).

The lowest point of the canton is in Nanthiat at 135 m, the highest point is in Saint-Cyr-les-Champagnes at 435 m, the average elevation is 375 m. The most populated commune was Payzac with 1,026 inhabitants (2012).

== Communes ==
The canton comprised the following communes:

- Angoisse
- Dussac
- Lanouaille
- Nanthiat
- Payzac
- Saint-Cyr-les-Champagnes
- Saint-Sulpice-d'Excideuil
- Sarlande
- Sarrazac
- Savignac-Lédrier

== Population history ==
Year	Population
1962	6,732
1968	7,486
1975	6,668
1982	6,185
1990	5,811
1999	5,509
2012	5,419

== See also ==
- Cantons of the Dordogne department
