= Canton of Isle-Loue-Auvézère =

Coordinates: 45°20′N 1°05′E

Isle-Loue-Auvézère
- Canton
- Interactive map of Isle-Loue-Auvézère
- Country: France
- Region: Nouvelle-Aquitaine
- Department: Dordogne
- No. of communes: {{{nbcomm}}}
- Area: 555.44 km^{2} (214.46 sq mi)
- Population (2023): 14,895
  - Density: 26.817/km^{2} (69.455/sq mi)
- INSEE code: 2411

The Canton of Isle-Loue-Auvézère is a canton of the Dordogne département, in France. It was created at the French canton reorganisation, which came into effect in March 2015, from the former canton of Lanouaille and parts of the former cantons of Excideuil, Savignac-les-Églises, Thenon and Hautefort. Its seat is the town Excideuil.

== Communes ==
The communes of the canton of Isle-Loue-Auvézère are:

- Angoisse
- Anlhiac
- Brouchaud
- Cherveix-Cubas
- Clermont-d'Excideuil
- Coulaures
- Cubjac-Auvézère-Val d'Ans
- Dussac
- Excideuil
- Génis
- Lanouaille
- Mayac
- Payzac
- Preyssac-d'Excideuil
- Saint-Cyr-les-Champagnes
- Saint-Germain-des-Prés
- Saint-Jory-las-Bloux
- Saint-Martial-d'Albarède
- Saint-Médard-d'Excideuil
- Saint-Mesmin
- Saint-Pantaly-d'Excideuil
- Saint-Raphaël
- Saint-Sulpice-d'Excideuil
- Saint-Vincent-sur-l'Isle
- Salagnac
- Sarlande
- Sarrazac
- Savignac-Lédrier
- Savignac-les-Églises

== See also ==
- Cantons of the Dordogne department
