= Arrondissement of Nontron =

Coordinates: 45.53°N 0.67°E

Nontron
- Arrondissement
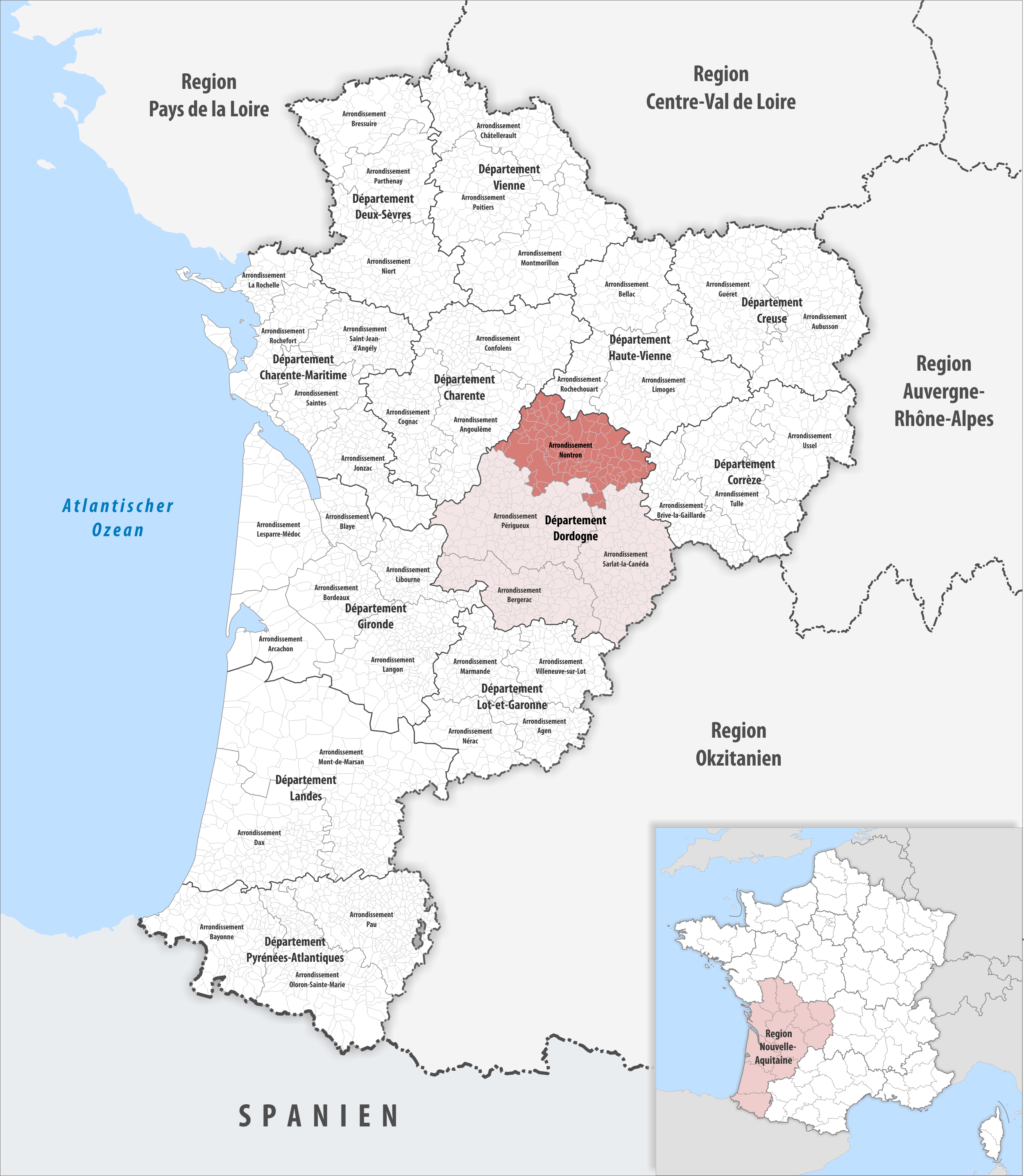
- Location within the region Nouvelle-Aquitaine
- Country: France
- Region: Nouvelle-Aquitaine
- Department: Dordogne
- No. of communes: {{{nbcomm}}}
- Area: 2,097.7 km^{2} (809.9 sq mi)
- Population (2023): 54,720
  - Density: 26.09/km^{2} (67.56/sq mi)
- INSEE code: 242

The arrondissement of Nontron is an arrondissement of France in the Dordogne department in the Nouvelle-Aquitaine region. It has 94 communes. Its population is 54,127 (2021), and its area is 2,097.7 km^{2} (809.9 sq mi).

== Composition ==
The communes of the arrondissement of Nontron, and their INSEE codes, are:

1. Abjat-sur-Bandiat (24001)
2. Angoisse (24008)
3. Anlhiac (24009)
4. Augignac (24016)
5. Biras (24042)
6. Bourdeilles (24055)
7. Le Bourdeix (24056)
8. Brantôme en Périgord (24064)
9. Brouchaud (24066)
10. Bussac (24069)
11. Busserolles (24070)
12. Bussière-Badil (24071)
13. Chalais (24095)
14. Champagnac-de-Belair (24096)
15. Champniers-et-Reilhac (24100)
16. Champs-Romain (24101)
17. La Chapelle-Faucher (24107)
18. La Chapelle-Montmoreau (24111)
19. Cherveix-Cubas (24120)
20. Clermont-d'Excideuil (24124)
21. Condat-sur-Trincou (24129)
22. Connezac (24131)
23. La Coquille (24133)
24. Corgnac-sur-l'Isle (24134)
25. Coulaures (24137)
26. Cubjac-Auvézère-Val d'Ans (24147)
27. Dussac (24158)
28. Étouars (24163)
29. Excideuil (24164)
30. Eyzerac (24171)
31. Firbeix (24180)
32. Génis (24196)
33. Hautefaye (24209)
34. Javerlhac-et-la-Chapelle-Saint-Robert (24214)
35. Jumilhac-le-Grand (24218)
36. Lanouaille (24227)
37. Lempzours (24238)
38. Lussas-et-Nontronneau (24248)
39. Mareuil en Périgord (24253)
40. Mayac (24262)
41. Mialet (24269)
42. Milhac-de-Nontron (24271)
43. Nantheuil (24304)
44. Nanthiat (24305)
45. Négrondes (24308)
46. Nontron (24311)
47. Payzac (24320)
48. Piégut-Pluviers (24328)
49. Preyssac-d'Excideuil (24339)
50. Quinsac (24346)
51. La Rochebeaucourt-et-Argentine (24353)
52. Rudeau-Ladosse (24221)
53. Saint-Barthélemy-de-Bussière (24381)
54. Saint-Cyr-les-Champagnes (24397)
55. Sainte-Croix-de-Mareuil (24394)
56. Saint-Estèphe (24398)
57. Saint-Félix-de-Bourdeilles (24403)
58. Saint-Front-d'Alemps (24408)
59. Saint-Front-la-Rivière (24410)
60. Saint-Front-sur-Nizonne (24411)
61. Saint-Germain-des-Prés (24417)
62. Saint-Jean-de-Côle (24425)
63. Saint-Jory-de-Chalais (24428)
64. Saint-Jory-las-Bloux (24429)
65. Saint-Martial-d'Albarède (24448)
66. Saint-Martial-de-Valette (24451)
67. Saint-Martin-de-Fressengeas (24453)
68. Saint-Martin-le-Pin (24458)
69. Saint-Médard-d'Excideuil (24463)
70. Saint-Mesmin (24464)
71. Saint-Pancrace (24474)
72. Saint-Pantaly-d'Excideuil (24476)
73. Saint-Pardoux-la-Rivière (24479)
74. Saint-Paul-la-Roche (24481)
75. Saint-Pierre-de-Côle (24485)
76. Saint-Pierre-de-Frugie (24486)
77. Saint-Priest-les-Fougères (24489)
78. Saint-Raphaël (24493)
79. Saint-Romain-et-Saint-Clément (24496)
80. Saint-Saud-Lacoussière (24498)
81. Saint-Sulpice-d'Excideuil (24505)
82. Saint-Vincent-sur-l'Isle (24513)
83. Salagnac (24515)
84. Sarlande (24519)
85. Sarrazac (24522)
86. Savignac-de-Nontron (24525)
87. Savignac-Lédrier (24526)
88. Sceau-Saint-Angel (24528)
89. Soudat (24541)
90. Teyjat (24548)
91. Thiviers (24551)
92. Varaignes (24565)
93. Vaunac (24567)
94. Villars (24582)

== History ==
The arrondissement of Nontron was created in 1800. At the January 2017 reorganisation of the arrondissements of Dordogne, it gained 28 communes from the arrondissement of Périgueux.

As a result of the reorganisation of the cantons of France which came into effect in 2015, the borders of the cantons are no longer related to the borders of the arrondissements. The cantons of the arrondissement of Nontron were, as of January 2015:

1. Bussière-Badil
2. Champagnac-de-Belair
3. Jumilhac-le-Grand
4. Lanouaille
5. Mareuil
6. Nontron
7. Saint-Pardoux-la-Rivière
8. Thiviers
