= Mayac =

- Commune
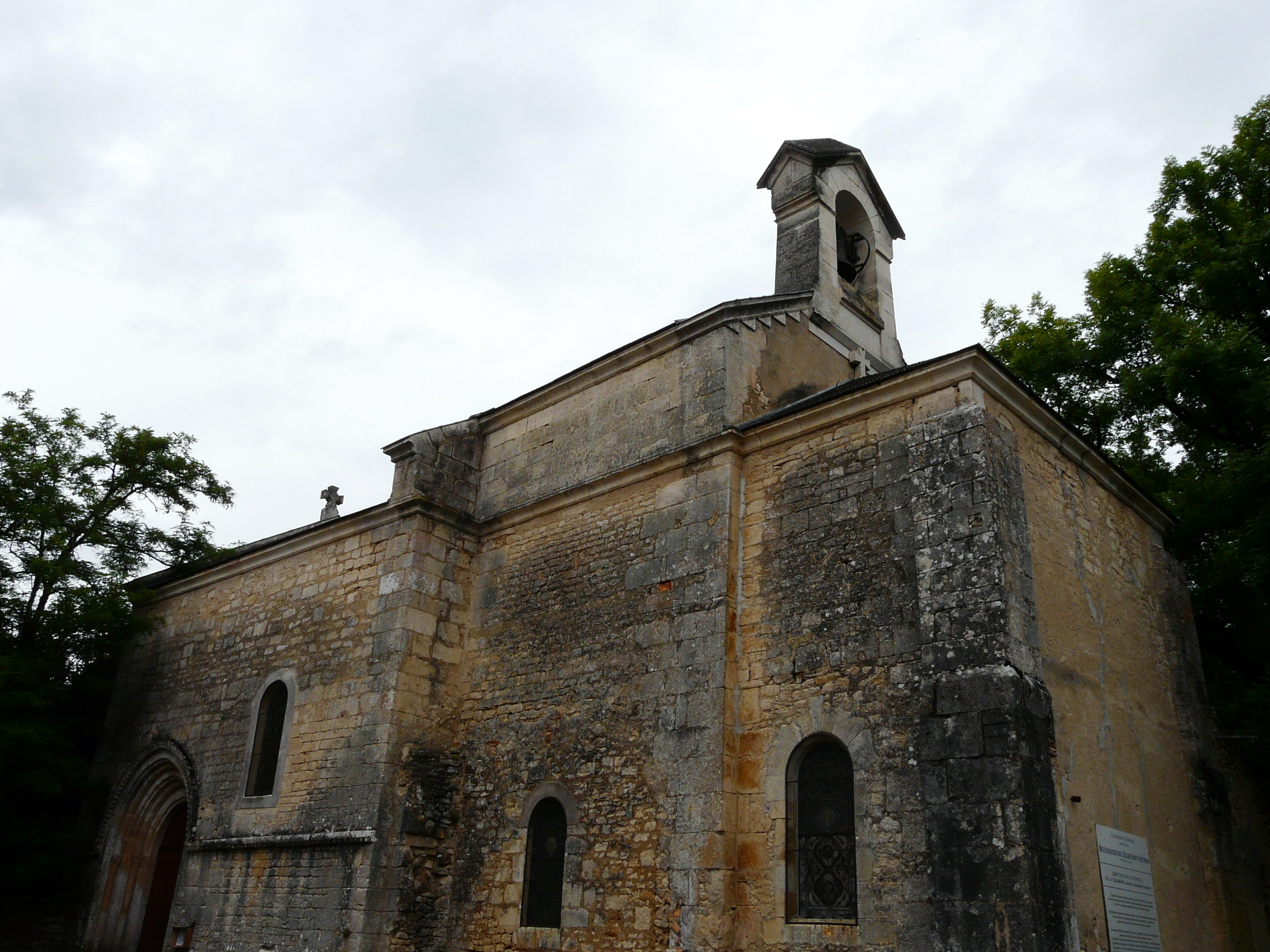
- The church in Mayac
- Location of Mayac
- Location within France Location within Nouvelle-Aquitaine
- Coordinates: 45°16′52″N 0°56′41″E
- Country: France
- Region: Nouvelle-Aquitaine
- Department: Dordogne
- Arrondissement: Nontron
- Canton: Isle-Loue-Auvézère

Government
  - Mayor (2020–2026): Jean-Michel Quémeré
- Area^{1}: 11.28 km^{2} (4.36 sq mi)
- Elevation: 20 m (66 ft)
- Highest elevation: 230 m (750 ft)
- Lowest elevation: 110 m (360 ft)
- Population (2023): 325
  - Density: 28.8/km^{2} (74.6/sq mi)
- Time zone: UTC+01:00 (CET)
  - Summer (DST): UTC+02:00 (CEST)
- INSEE/Postal code: 24262 /24420
- ^{1} French Land Register data, which excludes lakes, ponds, glaciers > 1 km^{2} (0.386 sq mi or 247 acres) and river estuaries.

Mayac (French pronunciation: [majak]; Occitan: Maiac) is a commune in the Dordogne department in Nouvelle-Aquitaine in southwestern France.

== Population ==
Historical population
Year	Pop.	±% p.a.
1968	269	—
1975	268	−0.05%
1982	245	−1.27%
1990	247	+0.10%
1999	306	+2.41%
2007	294	−0.50%
2012	306	+0.80%
2017	342	+2.25%
2023	325	−0.85%
Source: INSEE

== See also ==
- Communes of the Dordogne department
