= Payzac, Dordogne =

Payzac
- Commune
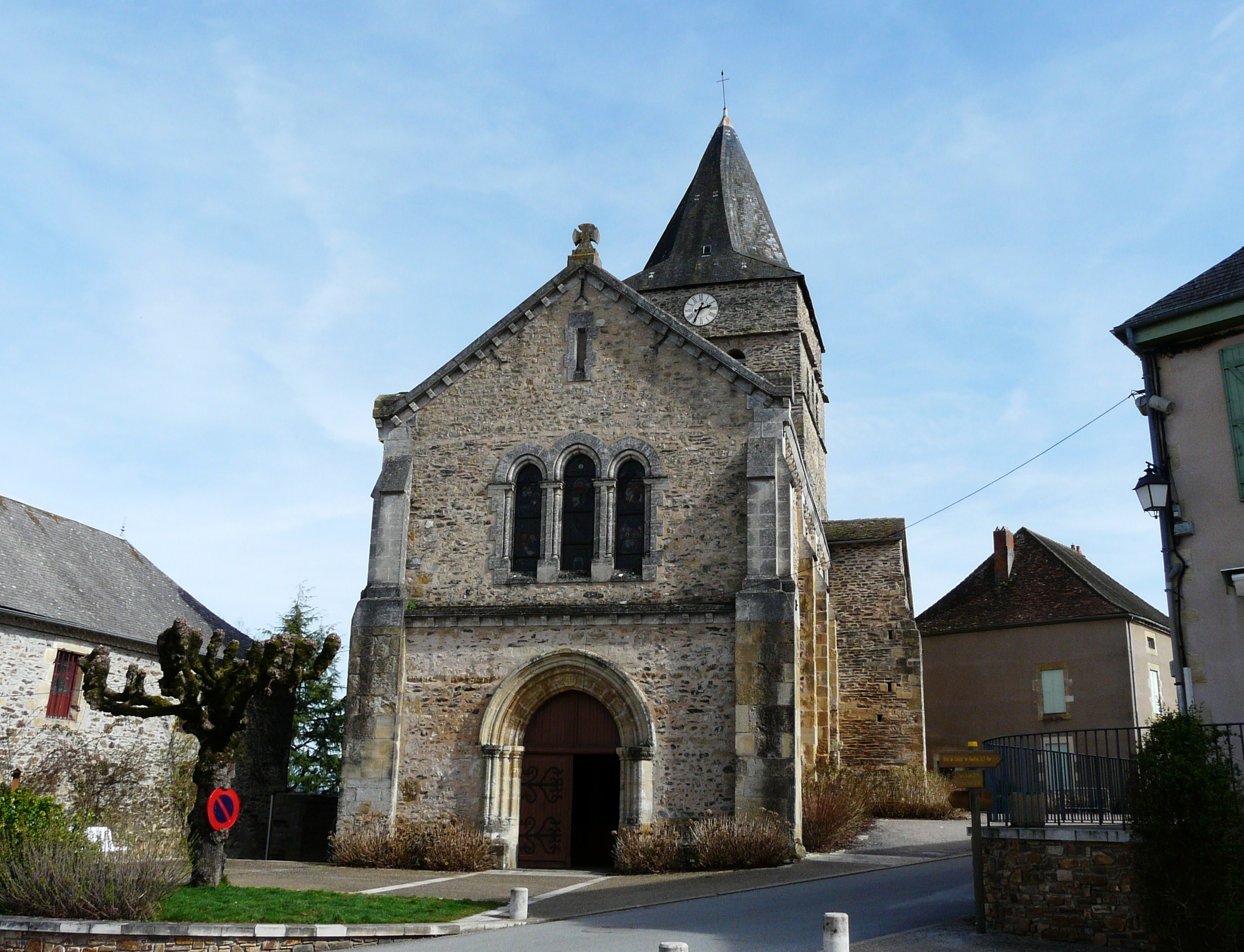
- The church in Payzac

- Coat of arms
- Location of Payzac
- Location within France Location within Nouvelle-Aquitaine
- Coordinates: 45°24′06″N 1°13′07″E
- Country: France
- Region: Nouvelle-Aquitaine
- Department: Dordogne
- Arrondissement: Nontron
- Canton: Isle-Loue-Auvézère

Government
  - Mayor (2020–2026): Jean-Michel Lamassiaude
- Area^{1}: 47.72 km^{2} (18.42 sq mi)
- Elevation: 334 m (1,096 ft)
- Highest elevation: 374 m (1,227 ft)
- Lowest elevation: 236 m (774 ft)
- Population (2023): 984
  - Density: 20.6/km^{2} (53.4/sq mi)
- Time zone: UTC+01:00 (CET)
  - Summer (DST): UTC+02:00 (CEST)
- INSEE/Postal code: 24320 /24270
- ^{1} French Land Register data, which excludes lakes, ponds, glaciers > 1 km^{2} (0.386 sq mi or 247 acres) and river estuaries.

Payzac (French pronunciation: [pɛzak]; Occitan: Paisac de la Noalha) is a commune in the Dordogne department in Nouvelle-Aquitaine in southwestern France.

== Population ==
Historical population
Year	Pop.	±% p.a.
1968	1,407	—
1975	1,308	−1.04%
1982	1,205	−1.16%
1990	1,106	−1.07%
1999	1,041	−0.67%
2007	1,061	+0.24%
2012	1,026	−0.67%
2017	980	−0.91%
2023	984	+0.07%
Source: INSEE

== History ==
The commune was written as Peisac, Peyzac, Paysac and since the late-19th century: Payzac. The official name Payzac replaced the older name Payzac-de-Lanouaille in 1961.

During the French Revolution on Friday 23 August 1793, the communes of Boisseuilh, Coubjours, Génis, Payzac, Saint-Cyr-les-Champagnes, Saint Mesmin, Salagnac, Savignac, Saint-Trié (Sainte-Trie) and Teillots were detached from the Corrèze department, and reunited to the Dordogne department.

The commune is well known for its Rugby team "l'USPS" (lit. Payzac-Savignac Sporting Union), champion of France 3 in 2000 and in the Périgord-Agenais "regional honor promotion league" in 2007/2008.

== Mayors ==
A partial list of lords and mayors of Payzac:

- 1345-6 Charles de Blois and Jeanne de Penthievre, duke and duchess of Brittany, viscount and viscountess of Limoges
- Jean I of Châtillon, count of Penthièvre, viscount of Limoges, lord of Payzac
- -1453: Jean de l'Aigle, viscount of Limoges, lord of Payzac
- 1453-1455: Guillaume de Châtillon, count of, viscount of Limoges, lord of Payzac
- 1455-1481: Françoise de Châtillon, countess of Périgord, viscountess of Limoges, dame (lady) of Paysac
- 1481-1516: Jean d'Albret, king of Navarre, count of Périgord, viscount of Limoges, lord of Payzac
- 1516-1555 - Henri d'Albret, king of Navarre, count of Périgord, viscount of Limoges, lord of Payzac
- 1555-?: Jeanne d'Albret, queen of Navarre, countess of Périgord, viscountess of Limoges, lady of Paysac
- ?-1609: Henry IV, king of France and Navarre, count of Périgord, viscount of Limoges, lord of Paysac
- 1713-1741: François du Mas de Paysac, lord marquess of Paysac
- 1741-?: Joseph-François du Mas de Paysac, lord marquess of Paysac
- ?-1789: Charles-Odet du Mas de Paysac, lord marquess of Paysac
- 1790s: Coustillas, mayor
- February 1800: Degrassat
- 6 June 1811: Jean-Baptiste Eyssartier
- 30 September 1815: Lajugie-Larnaudie
- April 1817: Leonard Rupin
- 9 August 1832: Pierre Coustillas
- 15 May 1852: Piere Joussein
- February, 1875-?: Pierre Joussein
- July 1899 – 1911: Gustave le Clare
- 1908-: Dr. Dupinet
- 1919-1945: Charles le Clere
- mid-20th century: Feuillard
- 2001-2008: François le Clere
- 2008-2014: Jean-Michel Lamassiaude

== Personalities ==
Payzac was the birthplace of:

- Jean-Pierre Timbaud

== See also ==
- Communes of the Dordogne department
