= Cherveix-Cubas =

- Commune
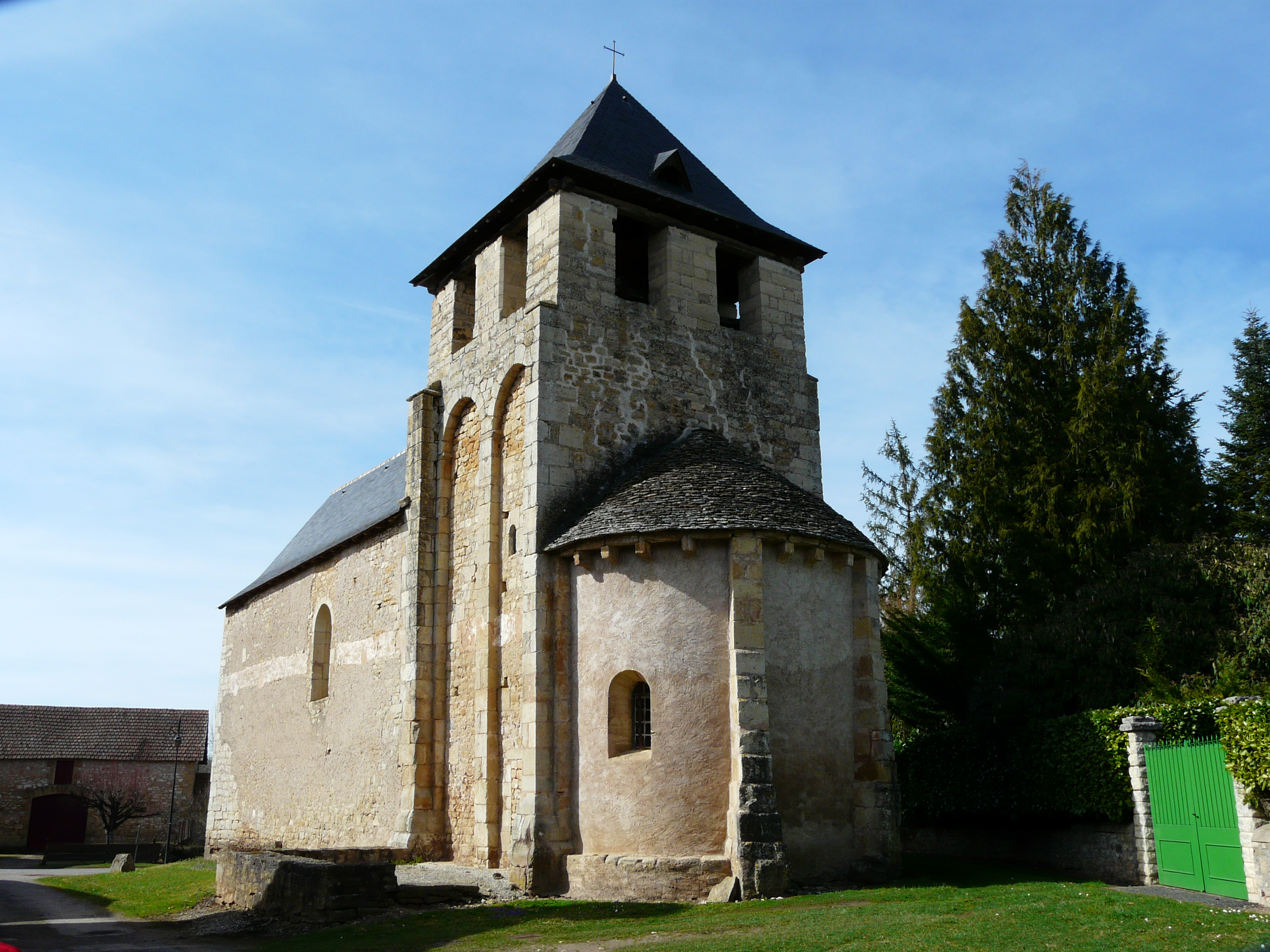
- The church of Saint-Martial-Laborie in Cherveix-Cubas
- Location of Cherveix-Cubas
- Location within France Location within Nouvelle-Aquitaine
- Coordinates: 45°17′28″N 1°07′01″E
- Country: France
- Region: Nouvelle-Aquitaine
- Department: Dordogne
- Arrondissement: Nontron
- Canton: Isle-Loue-Auvézère
- Intercommunality: Isle-Loue-Auvézère en Périgord

Government
  - Mayor (2020–2026): Jean-Marie Queyroi
- Area^{1}: 14.96 km^{2} (5.78 sq mi)
- Elevation: 150 m (490 ft)
- Highest elevation: 294 m (965 ft)
- Lowest elevation: 132 m (433 ft)
- Population (2023): 557
  - Density: 37.2/km^{2} (96.4/sq mi)
- Time zone: UTC+01:00 (CET)
  - Summer (DST): UTC+02:00 (CEST)
- INSEE/Postal code: 24120 /24390
- ^{1} French Land Register data, which excludes lakes, ponds, glaciers > 1 km^{2} (0.386 sq mi or 247 acres) and river estuaries.

Cherveix-Cubas (French pronunciation: [ʃɛʁvɛ kyba]; Occitan: Charvés e Cubas) is a commune in the Dordogne department in Nouvelle-Aquitaine in southwestern France.

Stage 3 of the 2023 Tour de France Femmes passed through Cherveix- Cubas on 25 July.

== Population ==
Historical population
Year	Pop.	±% p.a.
1968	712	—
1975	712	+0.00%
1982	665	−0.97%
1990	590	−1.48%
1999	600	+0.19%
2007	616	+0.33%
2012	628	+0.39%
2017	569	−1.95%
2023	557	−0.35%
Source: INSEE

== See also ==
- Communes of the Dordogne department
