= Saint-Vincent-sur-l'Isle =

- Commune
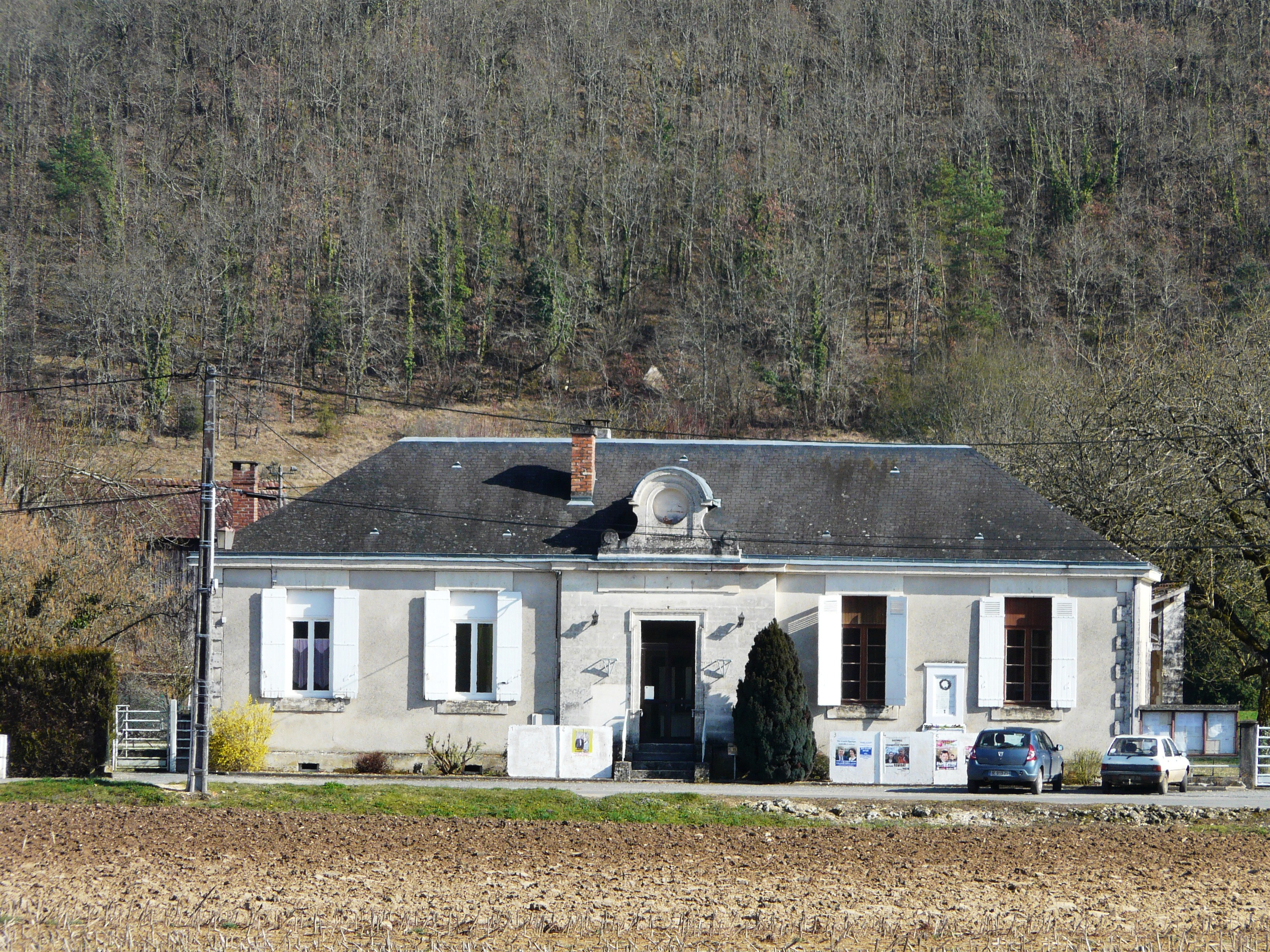
- The town hall in Saint-Vincent-sur-l'Isle
- Location of Saint-Vincent-sur-l'Isle
- Location within France Location within Nouvelle-Aquitaine
- Coordinates: 45°14′45″N 0°53′48″E
- Country: France
- Region: Nouvelle-Aquitaine
- Department: Dordogne
- Arrondissement: Nontron
- Canton: Isle-Loue-Auvézère

Government
  - Mayor (2020–2026): Annie Altier
- Area^{1}: 9.98 km^{2} (3.85 sq mi)
- Elevation: 106 m (348 ft)
- Highest elevation: 218 m (715 ft)
- Lowest elevation: 102 m (335 ft)
- Population (2023): 307
  - Density: 30.8/km^{2} (79.7/sq mi)
- Time zone: UTC+01:00 (CET)
  - Summer (DST): UTC+02:00 (CEST)
- INSEE/Postal code: 24513 /24420
- ^{1} French Land Register data, which excludes lakes, ponds, glaciers > 1 km^{2} (0.386 sq mi or 247 acres) and river estuaries.

Saint-Vincent-sur-l'Isle (French pronunciation: [sɛ̃ vɛ̃sɑ̃ syʁ lil]; Occitan: Sent Vincenç d'Eila) is a commune in the Dordogne department in Nouvelle-Aquitaine in southwestern France.

== Population ==
Historical population
Year	Pop.	±% p.a.
1968	155	—
1975	142	−1.24%
1982	152	+0.98%
1990	204	+3.75%
1999	191	−0.73%
2007	242	+3.00%
2012	282	+3.11%
2017	306	+1.65%
2023	307	+0.05%
Source: INSEE

== See also ==
- Communes of the Dordogne department
