= Coulaures =

- Commune
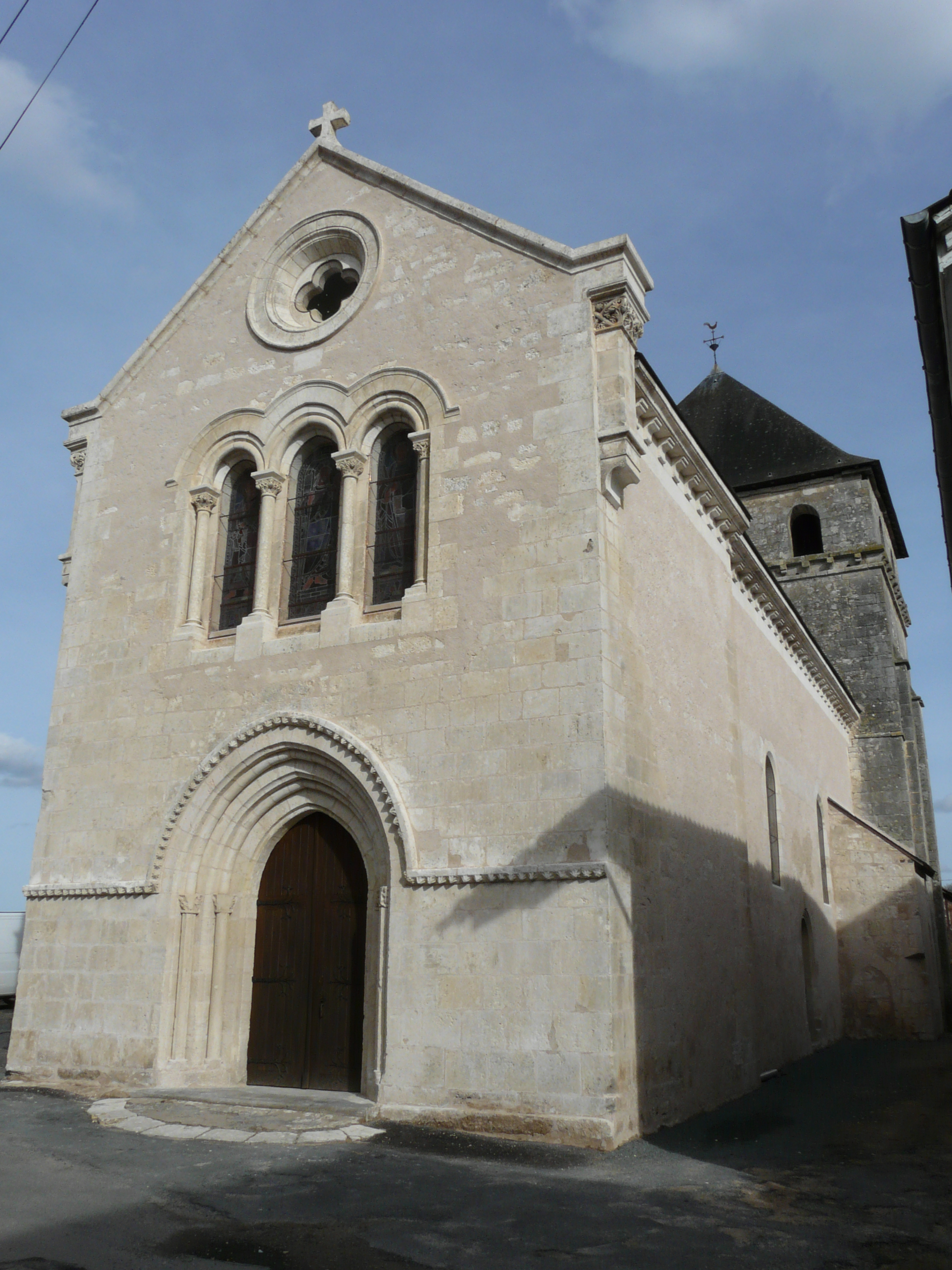
- The church in Coulaures
- Location of Coulaures
- Location within France Location within Nouvelle-Aquitaine
- Coordinates: 45°18′26″N 0°58′50″E
- Country: France
- Region: Nouvelle-Aquitaine
- Department: Dordogne
- Arrondissement: Nontron
- Canton: Isle-Loue-Auvézère

Government
  - Mayor (2020–2026): Corinne Ducrocq
- Area^{1}: 28.87 km^{2} (11.15 sq mi)
- Elevation: 120 m (390 ft)
- Highest elevation: 275 m (902 ft)
- Lowest elevation: 117 m (384 ft)
- Population (2023): 768
  - Density: 26.6/km^{2} (68.9/sq mi)
- Time zone: UTC+01:00 (CET)
  - Summer (DST): UTC+02:00 (CEST)
- INSEE/Postal code: 24137 /24420
- ^{1} French Land Register data, which excludes lakes, ponds, glaciers > 1 km^{2} (0.386 sq mi or 247 acres) and river estuaries.

Coulaures (French pronunciation: [kulɔʁ]; Occitan: Colòures) is a commune in the Dordogne department in Nouvelle-Aquitaine in southwestern France.

== Population ==
Historical population
Year	Pop.	±% p.a.
1968	754	—
1975	726	−0.54%
1982	696	−0.60%
1990	743	+0.82%
1999	683	−0.93%
2007	735	+0.92%
2012	737	+0.05%
2017	733	−0.11%
2023	768	+0.78%
Source: INSEE

== See also ==
- Communes of the Dordogne department
