= Lanouaille =

- Commune
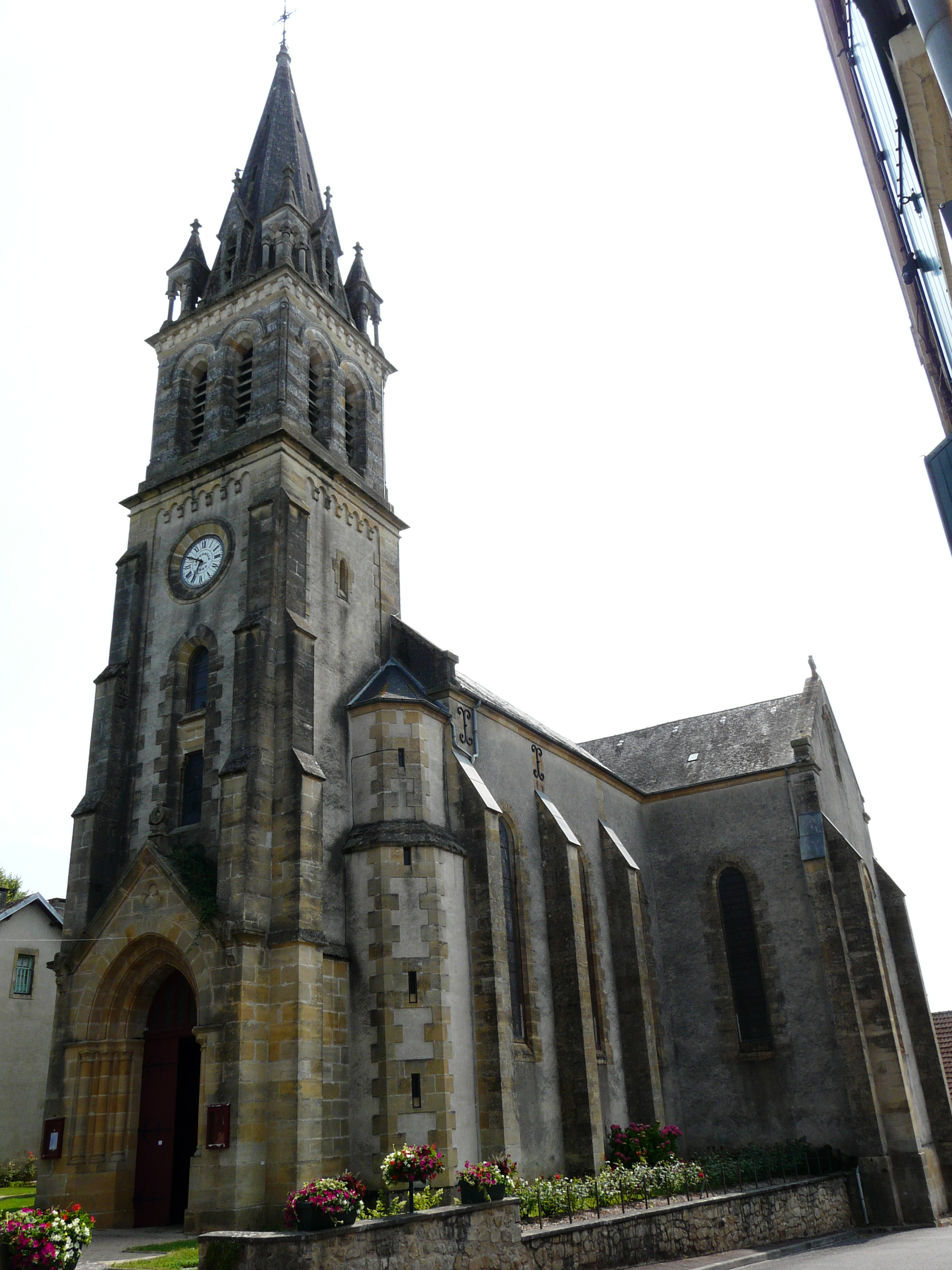
- The church in Lanouaille

- Coat of arms
- Location of Lanouaille
- Location within France Location within Nouvelle-Aquitaine
- Coordinates: 45°23′34″N 1°08′20″E
- Country: France
- Region: Nouvelle-Aquitaine
- Department: Dordogne
- Arrondissement: Nontron
- Canton: Isle-Loue-Auvézère
- Intercommunality: Isle-Loue-Auvézère en Périgord

Government
  - Mayor (2020–2026): Jean-Christophe Boulanger
- Area^{1}: 23.78 km^{2} (9.18 sq mi)
- Elevation: 300 m (980 ft)
- Highest elevation: 234 m (768 ft)
- Lowest elevation: 198 m (650 ft)
- Population (2023): 926
  - Density: 38.9/km^{2} (101/sq mi)
- Time zone: UTC+01:00 (CET)
  - Summer (DST): UTC+02:00 (CEST)
- INSEE/Postal code: 24227 /24270
- ^{1} French Land Register data, which excludes lakes, ponds, glaciers > 1 km^{2} (0.386 sq mi or 247 acres) and river estuaries.

Lanouaille (French pronunciation: [lanwaj]; Limousin: La Noalha) is a commune in the Dordogne department in Nouvelle-Aquitaine in southwestern France. The departmental road D704 (Sarlat–Limoges) passes through the town.

== History ==
Lanouaille (la nouvelle; "the new") is a relatively new commune created from parts of the areas of Savignac-Lédrier and Dussac. It owes its development to its location on the road from Sarlat to Limoges via Saint Yrieix and Montignac (D704) and to its status as seat of the canton until 2015 (before 1801 Dussac was the seat of the canton).

== Population ==
Historical population
Year	Pop.	±% p.a.
1968	1,025	—
1975	1,026	+0.01%
1982	1,006	−0.28%
1990	976	−0.38%
1999	966	−0.11%
2007	988	+0.28%
2012	1,002	+0.28%
2017	1,017	+0.30%
2023	926	−1.55%
Source: INSEE

== See also ==
- Communes of the Dordogne department
