= Savignac-les-Églises =

- Commune
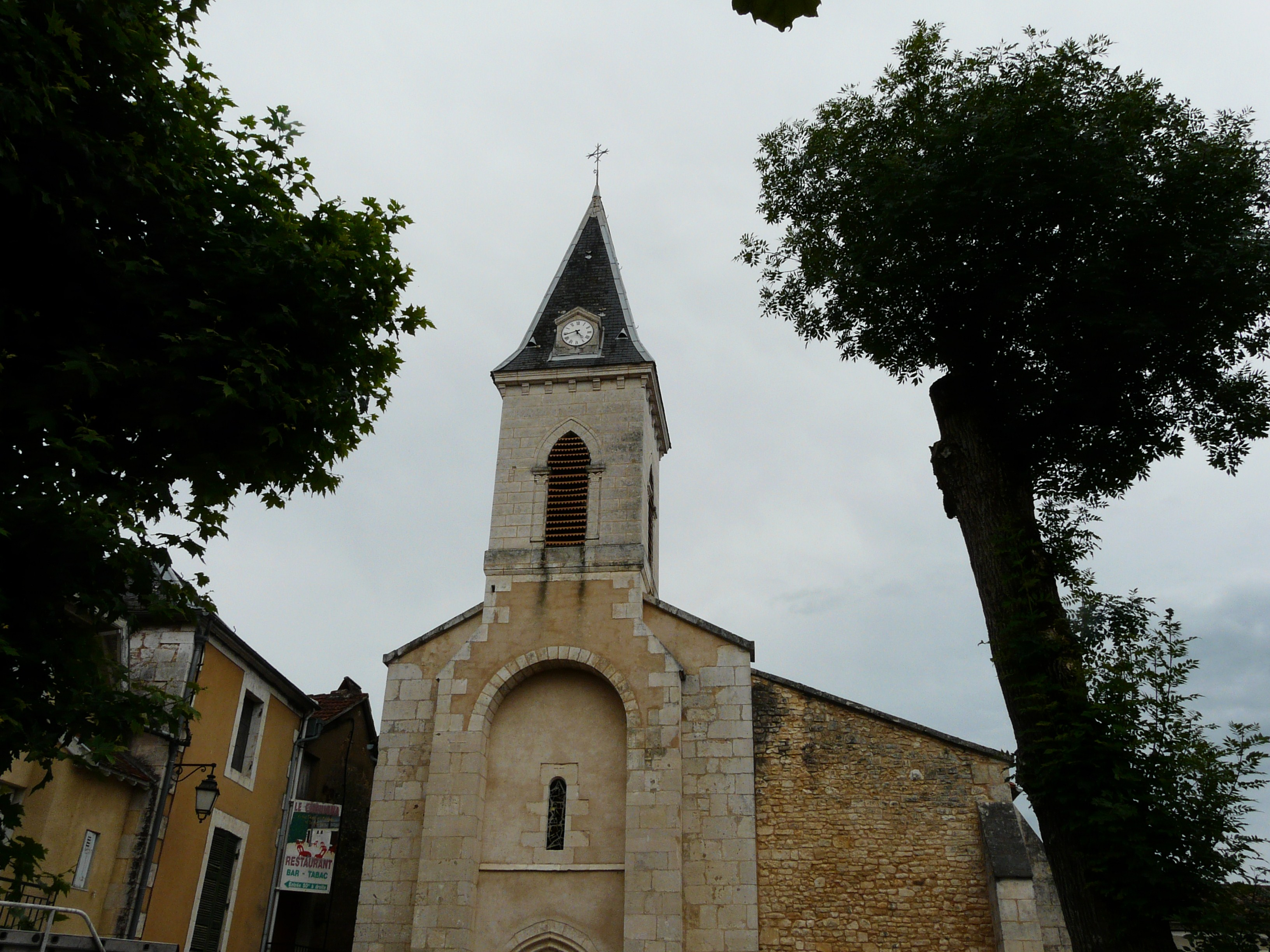
- The church in Savignac-les-Églises

- Coat of arms
- Location of Savignac-les-Églises
- Location within France Location within Nouvelle-Aquitaine
- Coordinates: 45°16′29″N 0°55′01″E
- Country: France
- Region: Nouvelle-Aquitaine
- Department: Dordogne
- Arrondissement: Périgueux
- Canton: Isle-Loue-Auvézère
- Intercommunality: Le Grand Périgueux

Government
  - Mayor (2020–2026): Évelyne Roux
- Area^{1}: 21.9 km^{2} (8.5 sq mi)
- Elevation: 111 m (364 ft)
- Highest elevation: 234 m (768 ft)
- Lowest elevation: 105 m (344 ft)
- Population (2023): 1,005
  - Density: 45.9/km^{2} (119/sq mi)
- Time zone: UTC+01:00 (CET)
  - Summer (DST): UTC+02:00 (CEST)
- INSEE/Postal code: 24527 /24420
- ^{1} French Land Register data, which excludes lakes, ponds, glaciers > 1 km^{2} (0.386 sq mi or 247 acres) and river estuaries.

Savignac-les-Églises (French pronunciation: [saviɲak le.z‿eɡliz]; Occitan: Savinhac de las Gleisas) is a commune in the Dordogne department in Nouvelle-Aquitaine in southwestern France.

== Population ==
Historical population
Year	Pop.	±% p.a.
1968	625	—
1975	732	+2.28%
1982	722	−0.20%
1990	853	+2.11%
1999	898	+0.57%
2007	953	+0.75%
2012	964	+0.23%
2017	972	+0.17%
2023	1,005	+0.56%
Source: INSEE

== See also ==
- Communes of the Dordogne département
