= Saint-Pantaly-d'Excideuil =

- Commune
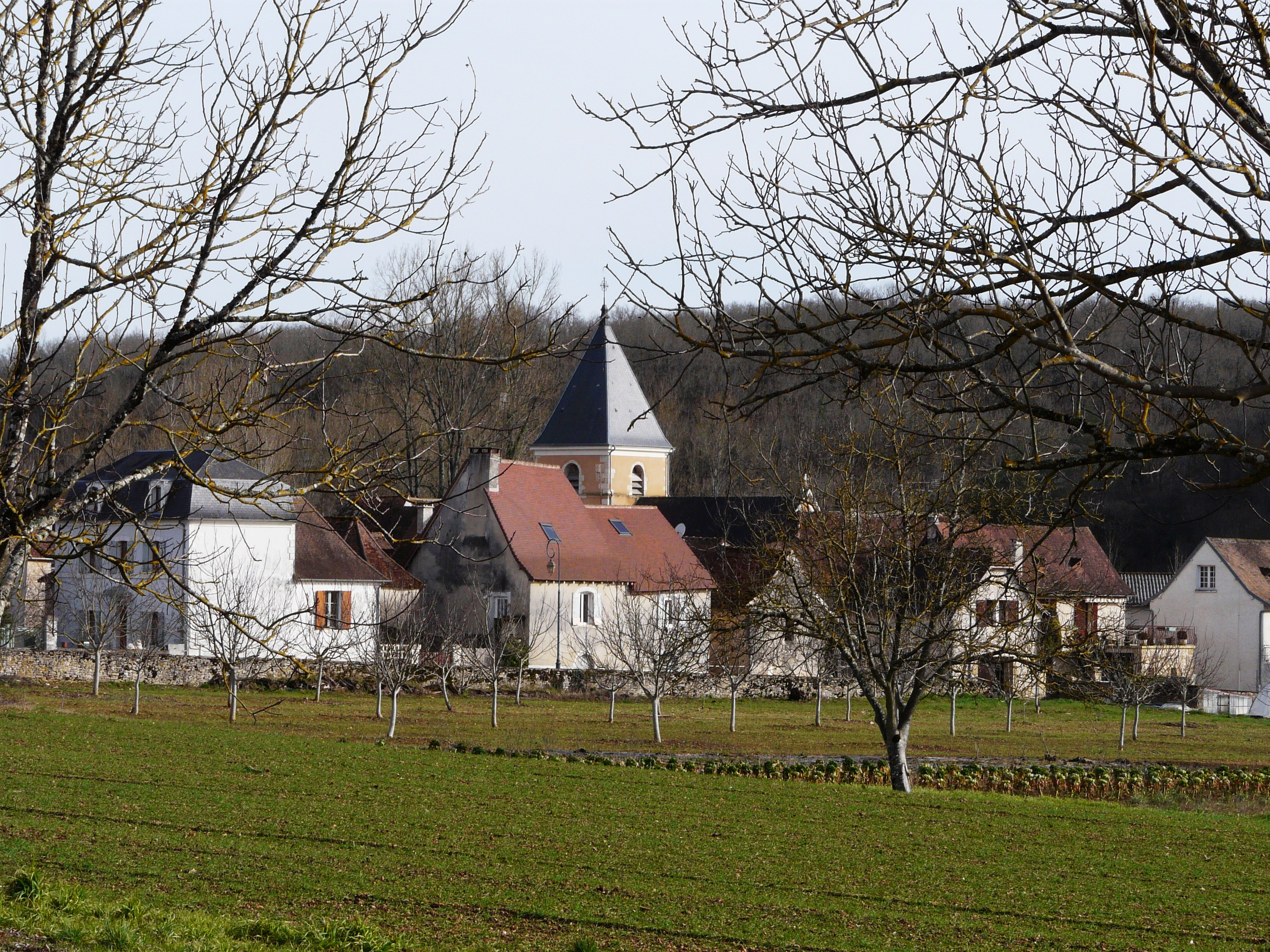
- A general view of Saint-Pantaly-d'Excideuil
- Location of Saint-Pantaly-d'Excideuil
- Location within France Location within Nouvelle-Aquitaine
- Coordinates: 45°19′01″N 1°00′56″E
- Country: France
- Region: Nouvelle-Aquitaine
- Department: Dordogne
- Arrondissement: Nontron
- Canton: Isle-Loue-Auvézère

Government
  - Mayor (2020–2026): Serge Revidat
- Area^{1}: 8.46 km^{2} (3.27 sq mi)
- Elevation: 131 m (430 ft)
- Highest elevation: 285 m (935 ft)
- Lowest elevation: 120 m (390 ft)
- Population (2023): 157
  - Density: 18.6/km^{2} (48.1/sq mi)
- Time zone: UTC+01:00 (CET)
  - Summer (DST): UTC+02:00 (CEST)
- INSEE/Postal code: 24476 /24160
- ^{1} French Land Register data, which excludes lakes, ponds, glaciers > 1 km^{2} (0.386 sq mi or 247 acres) and river estuaries.

Saint-Pantaly-d'Excideuil (French pronunciation: [sɛ̃ pɑ̃tali dɛksidœj], literally Saint-Pantaly of Excideuil; Occitan: Sent Pantalí d'Eissiduelh) is a commune in the Dordogne department in Nouvelle-Aquitaine in the southwestern part of France.

== Population ==
Historical population
Year	Pop.	±% p.a.
1968	203	—
1975	185	−1.32%
1982	155	−2.50%
1990	142	−1.09%
1999	157	+1.12%
2007	155	−0.16%
2012	155	+0.00%
2017	150	−0.65%
2023	157	+0.76%
Source: INSEE

== See also ==
- Communes of the Dordogne department
