= Sarlande =

- Commune
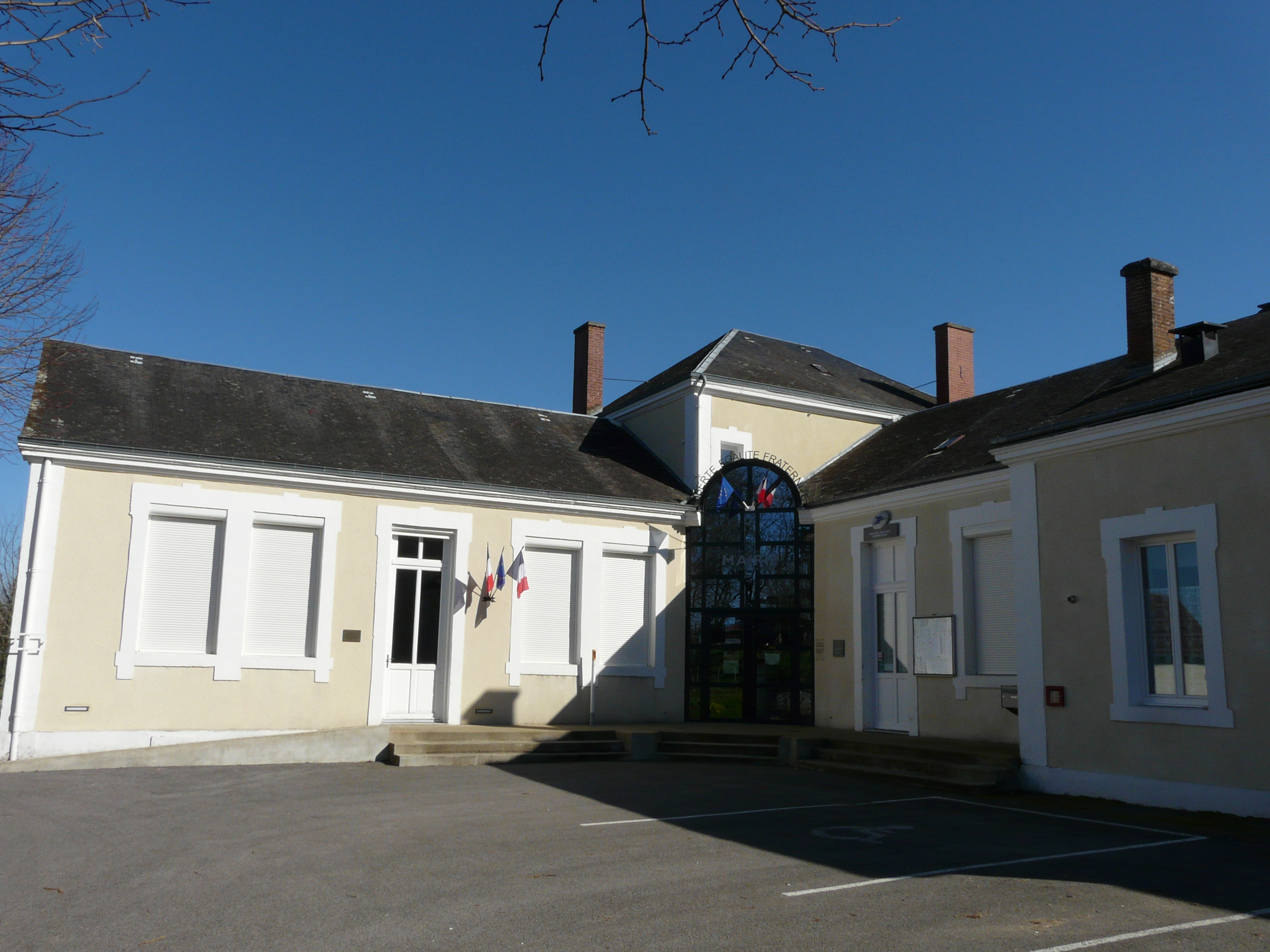
- The town hall in Sarlande
- Location of Sarlande
- Location within France Location within Nouvelle-Aquitaine
- Coordinates: 45°27′07″N 1°07′06″E
- Country: France
- Region: Nouvelle-Aquitaine
- Department: Dordogne
- Arrondissement: Nontron
- Canton: Isle-Loue-Auvézère

Government
  - Mayor (2020–2026): Alain Meyzie
- Area^{1}: 34.74 km^{2} (13.41 sq mi)
- Elevation: 350 m (1,150 ft)
- Highest elevation: 388 m (1,273 ft)
- Lowest elevation: 233 m (764 ft)
- Population (2023): 428
  - Density: 12.3/km^{2} (31.9/sq mi)
- Time zone: UTC+01:00 (CET)
  - Summer (DST): UTC+02:00 (CEST)
- INSEE/Postal code: 24519 /24270
- ^{1} French Land Register data, which excludes lakes, ponds, glaciers > 1 km^{2} (0.386 sq mi or 247 acres) and river estuaries.

Sarlande (French pronunciation: [saʁlɑ̃d]; Occitan: Sarlanda) is a commune in the Dordogne department in Nouvelle-Aquitaine in southwestern France.

== Population ==
Historical population
Year	Pop.	±% p.a.
1968	697	—
1975	621	−1.64%
1982	524	−2.40%
1990	468	−1.40%
1999	420	−1.20%
2007	417	−0.09%
2012	412	−0.24%
2017	432	+0.95%
2023	428	−0.15%
Source: INSEE

== See also ==
- Communes of the Dordogne department
