= Salagnac =

- Commune
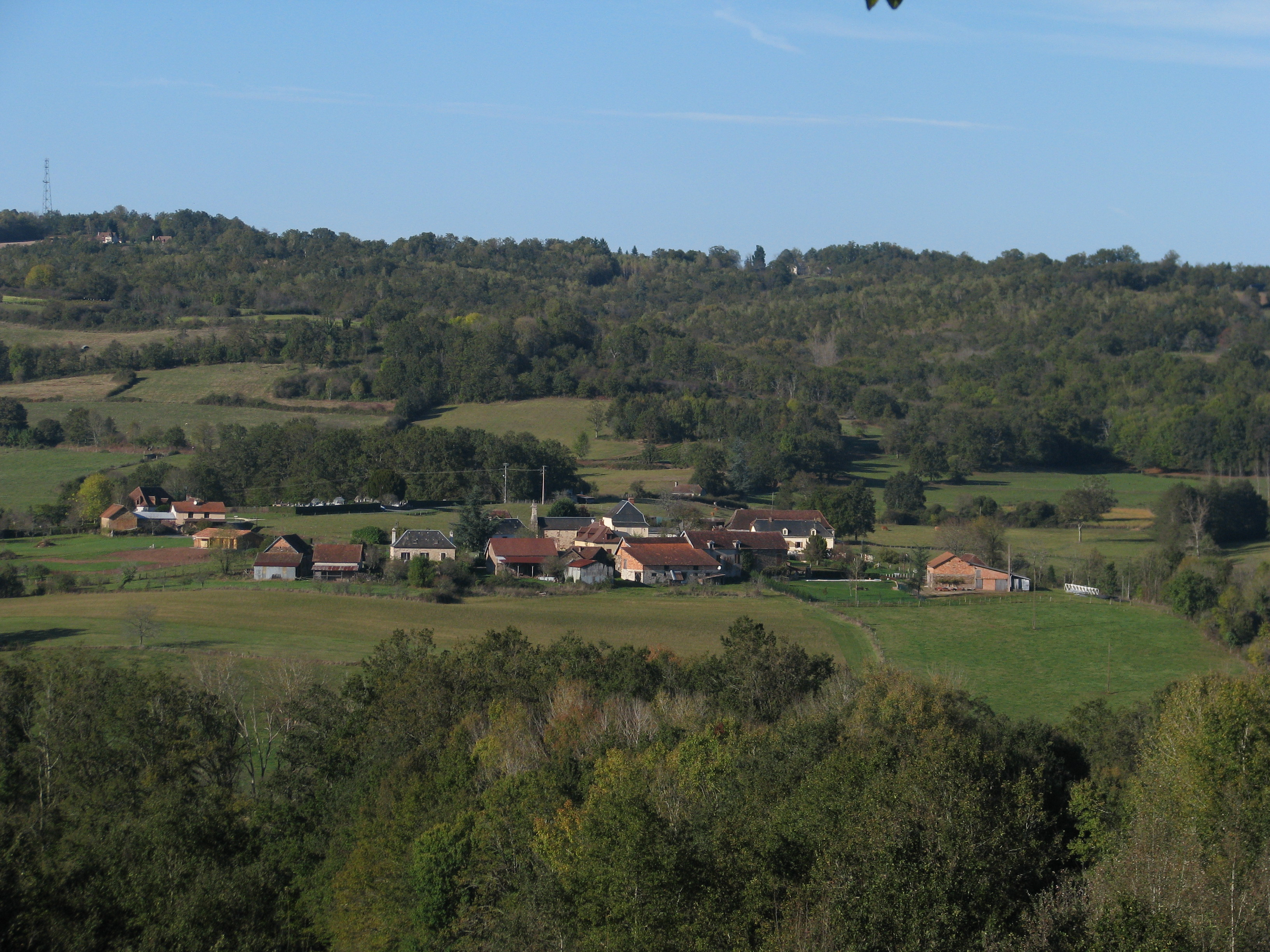
- A general view of Salagnac

- Coat of arms
- Location of Salagnac
- Location within France Location within Nouvelle-Aquitaine
- Coordinates: 45°18′43″N 1°11′56″E
- Country: France
- Region: Nouvelle-Aquitaine
- Department: Dordogne
- Arrondissement: Nontron
- Canton: Isle-Loue-Auvézère

Government
  - Mayor (2020–2026): Laurent Baronnet
- Area^{1}: 9.08 km^{2} (3.51 sq mi)
- Elevation: 190 m (620 ft)
- Highest elevation: 354 m (1,161 ft)
- Lowest elevation: 176 m (577 ft)
- Population (2023): 686
  - Density: 75.6/km^{2} (196/sq mi)
- Time zone: UTC+01:00 (CET)
  - Summer (DST): UTC+02:00 (CEST)
- INSEE/Postal code: 24515 /24160
- ^{1} French Land Register data, which excludes lakes, ponds, glaciers > 1 km^{2} (0.386 sq mi or 247 acres) and river estuaries.

Salagnac (French pronunciation: [salaɲak]; Occitan: Salanhac) is a commune in the Dordogne department in Nouvelle-Aquitaine in southwestern France.

== History ==
During the creation of the French departments in 1790, it first joined the Corrèze department. In 1793 it became part of the Dordogne department.

== Population ==
Historical population
| Year | Pop. | ±% p.a. |
|---|---|---|
| 1968 | 826 | — |
| 1975 | 1,122 | +4.47% |
| 1982 | 833 | −4.17% |
| 1990 | 812 | −0.32% |
| 1999 | 785 | −0.38% |
| 2007 | 910 | +1.86% |
| 2012 | 852 | −1.31% |
| 2017 | 769 | −2.03% |
| 2023 | 686 | −1.89% |
Source: INSEE

== See also ==
- Communes of the Dordogne department
