= Génis =

- Commune
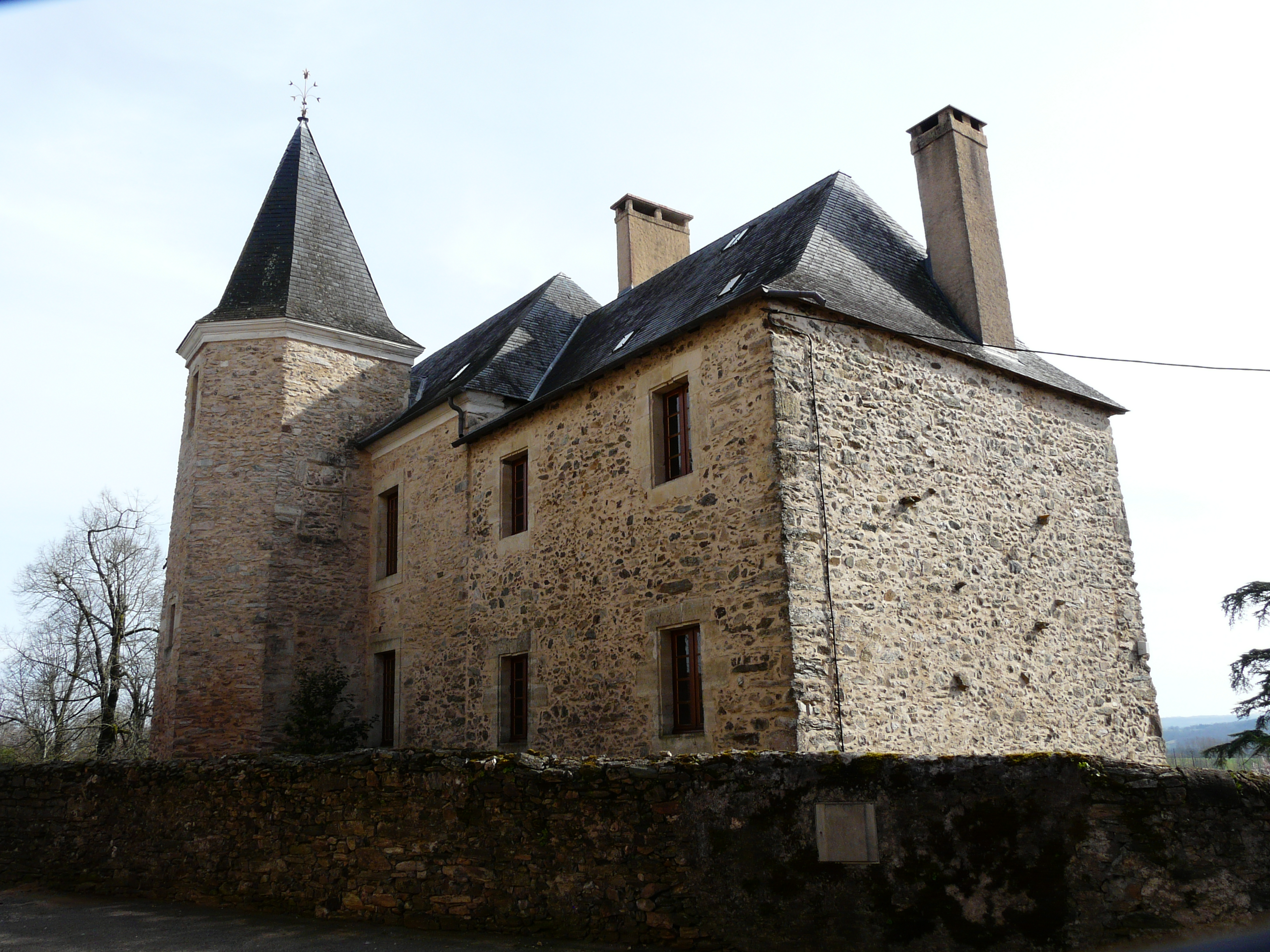
- Manor house of Falesie

- Coat of arms
- Location of Génis
- Location within France Location within Nouvelle-Aquitaine
- Coordinates: 45°19′37″N 1°09′52″E
- Country: France
- Region: Nouvelle-Aquitaine
- Department: Dordogne
- Arrondissement: Nontron
- Canton: Isle-Loue-Auvézère

Government
  - Mayor (2020–2026): Marianne Reynaud-Lasternas
- Area^{1}: 25.92 km^{2} (10.01 sq mi)
- Elevation: 300 m (980 ft)
- Highest elevation: 373 m (1,224 ft)
- Lowest elevation: 140 m (460 ft)
- Population (2023): 516
  - Density: 19.9/km^{2} (51.6/sq mi)
- Time zone: UTC+01:00 (CET)
  - Summer (DST): UTC+02:00 (CEST)
- INSEE/Postal code: 24196 /24160
- ^{1} French Land Register data, which excludes lakes, ponds, glaciers > 1 km^{2} (0.386 sq mi or 247 acres) and river estuaries.

Génis is a commune in the Dordogne department in Nouvelle-Aquitaine in southwestern France.

== Population ==
Historical population
Year	Pop.	±% p.a.
1968	776	—
1975	660	−2.29%
1982	599	−1.38%
1990	538	−1.33%
1999	496	−0.90%
2007	490	−0.15%
2012	470	−0.83%
2017	478	+0.34%
2023	516	+1.28%
Source: INSEE

== See also ==
- Communes of the Dordogne department
