= Saint-Jory-las-Bloux =

- Commune
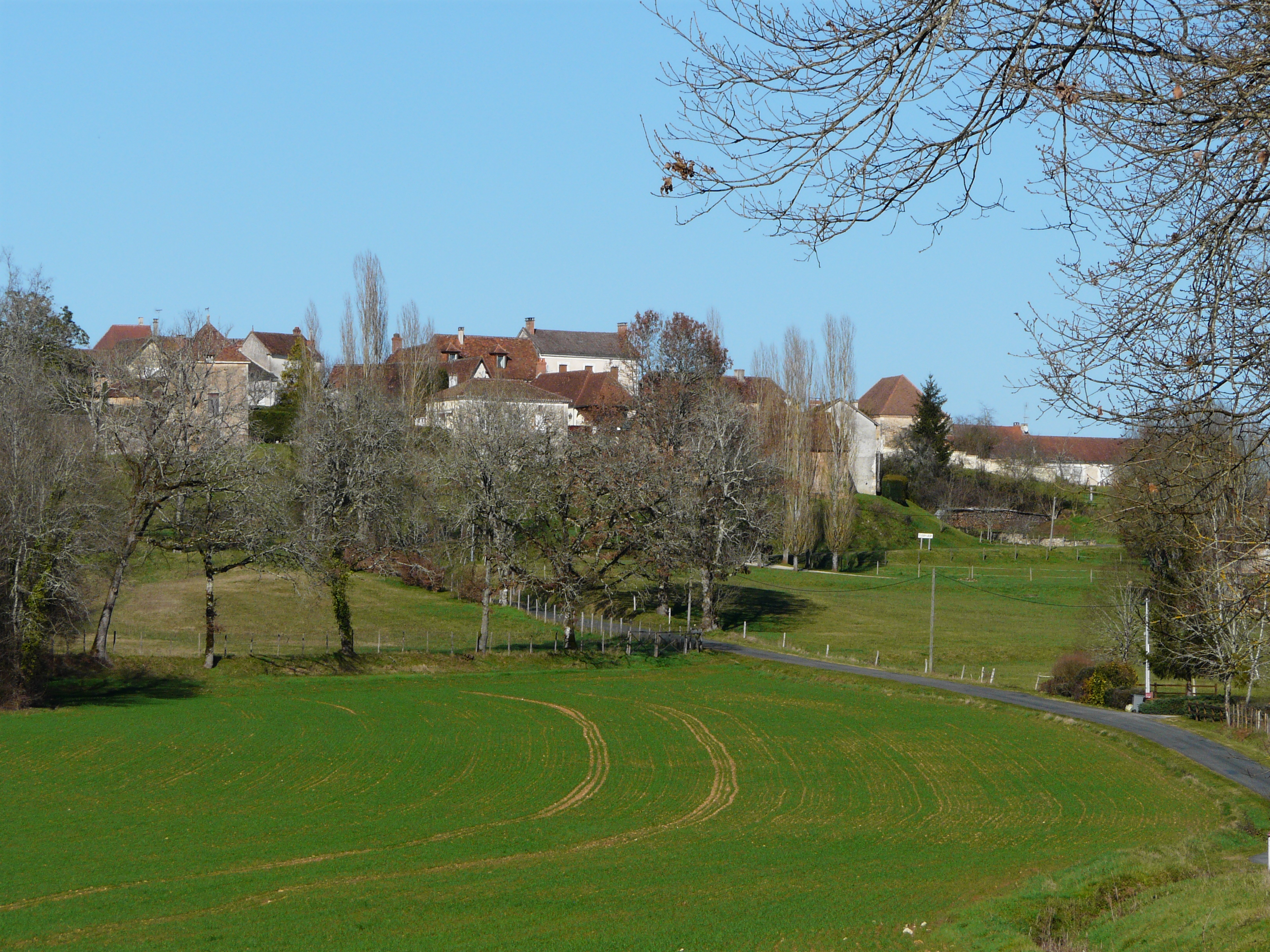
- A general view of Saint-Jory-las-Bloux

- Coat of arms
- Location of Saint-Jory-las-Bloux
- Location within France Location within Nouvelle-Aquitaine
- Coordinates: 45°21′47″N 0°58′00″E
- Country: France
- Region: Nouvelle-Aquitaine
- Department: Dordogne
- Arrondissement: Nontron
- Canton: Isle-Loue-Auvézère

Government
  - Mayor (2020–2026): Jean-Pierre Sautonie
- Area^{1}: 16.94 km^{2} (6.54 sq mi)
- Elevation: 190 m (620 ft)
- Highest elevation: 242 m (794 ft)
- Lowest elevation: 123 m (404 ft)
- Population (2023): 245
  - Density: 14.5/km^{2} (37.5/sq mi)
- Time zone: UTC+01:00 (CET)
  - Summer (DST): UTC+02:00 (CEST)
- INSEE/Postal code: 24429 /24160
- ^{1} French Land Register data, which excludes lakes, ponds, glaciers > 1 km^{2} (0.386 sq mi or 247 acres) and river estuaries.

Saint-Jory-las-Bloux is a commune in the Dordogne department in Nouvelle-Aquitaine in southwestern France.

== Geography ==
The commune is situated on a promontory above the river Isle, on the border of Périgord Blanc and the Périgord Vert. It is a green area, with springs and limestone rocks.

== Population ==
Historical population
| Year | Pop. | ±% p.a. |
|---|---|---|
| 1968 | 271 | — |
| 1975 | 229 | −2.38% |
| 1982 | 251 | +1.32% |
| 1990 | 241 | −0.51% |
| 1999 | 237 | −0.19% |
| 2007 | 249 | +0.62% |
| 2012 | 254 | +0.40% |
| 2017 | 236 | −1.46% |
| 2023 | 245 | +0.63% |
Source: INSEE

== Sights ==
- A château built during the 16th and the 17th centuries.

== See also ==
- Communes of the Dordogne department
