= Saint-Raphaël, Dordogne =

Saint-Raphaël
- Commune
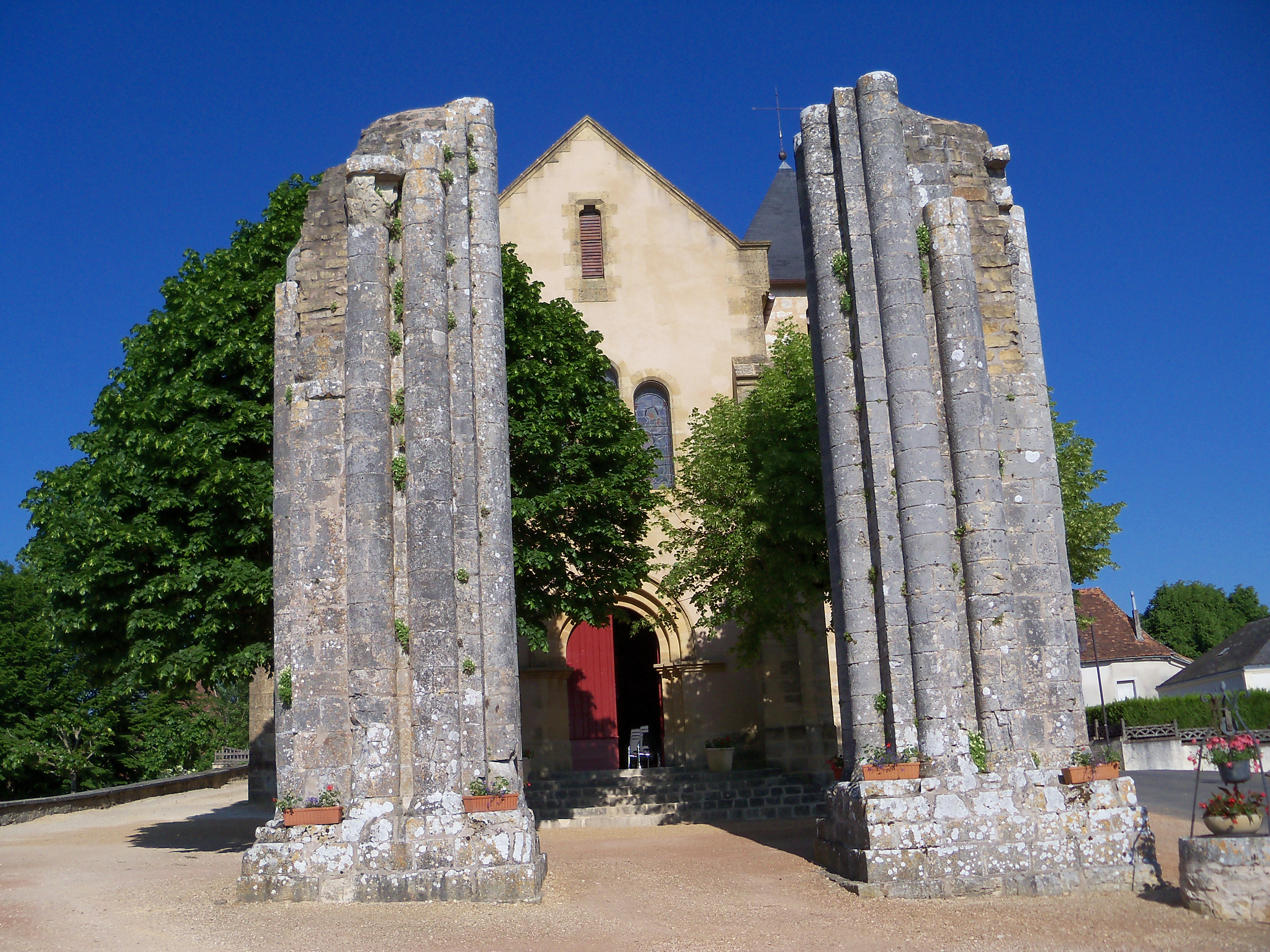
- The church in Saint-Raphaël
- Location of Saint-Raphaël
- Location within France Location within Nouvelle-Aquitaine
- Coordinates: 45°18′18″N 1°04′32″E
- Country: France
- Region: Nouvelle-Aquitaine
- Department: Dordogne
- Arrondissement: Nontron
- Canton: Isle-Loue-Auvézère

Government
  - Mayor (2020–2026): François Philippe Clergerie
- Area^{1}: 7.13 km^{2} (2.75 sq mi)
- Elevation: 288 m (945 ft)
- Highest elevation: 296 m (971 ft)
- Lowest elevation: 161 m (528 ft)
- Population (2023): 94
  - Density: 13/km^{2} (34/sq mi)
- Time zone: UTC+01:00 (CET)
  - Summer (DST): UTC+02:00 (CEST)
- INSEE/Postal code: 24493 /24160
- ^{1} French Land Register data, which excludes lakes, ponds, glaciers > 1 km^{2} (0.386 sq mi or 247 acres) and river estuaries.

Saint-Raphaël (French pronunciation: [sɛ̃ ʁafaɛl]; Occitan: Sent Rafeu) is a commune in the Dordogne department in Nouvelle-Aquitaine, France.

== Population ==
Historical population
| Year | Pop. | ±% p.a. |
|---|---|---|
| 1968 | 112 | — |
| 1975 | 89 | −3.23% |
| 1982 | 93 | +0.63% |
| 1990 | 109 | +2.00% |
| 1999 | 93 | −1.75% |
| 2007 | 100 | +0.91% |
| 2012 | 115 | +2.83% |
| 2017 | 94 | −3.95% |
| 2023 | 94 | +0.00% |
Source: INSEE

== See also ==
- Communes of the Dordogne department
