= Preyssac-d'Excideuil =

- Commune
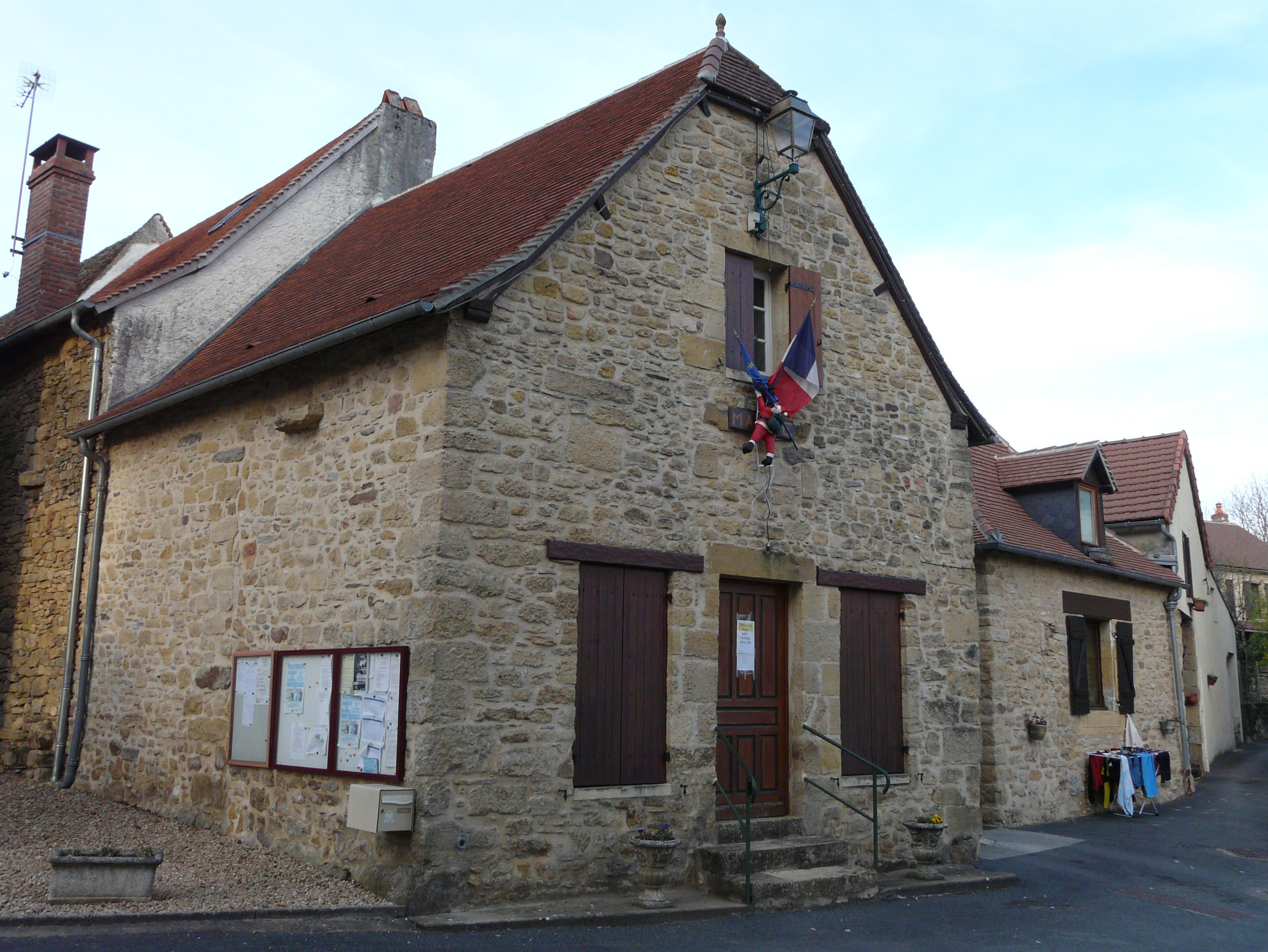
- The town hall in Preyssac-d'Excideuil
- Location of Preyssac-d'Excideuil
- Location within France Location within Nouvelle-Aquitaine
- Coordinates: 45°20′18″N 1°06′13″E
- Country: France
- Region: Nouvelle-Aquitaine
- Department: Dordogne
- Arrondissement: Nontron
- Canton: Isle-Loue-Auvézère

Government
  - Mayor (2020–2026): Vincent Célerier
- Area^{1}: 3.38 km^{2} (1.31 sq mi)
- Elevation: 200 m (660 ft)
- Highest elevation: 326 m (1,070 ft)
- Lowest elevation: 200 m (660 ft)
- Population (2023): 152
  - Density: 45.0/km^{2} (116/sq mi)
- Time zone: UTC+01:00 (CET)
  - Summer (DST): UTC+02:00 (CEST)
- INSEE/Postal code: 24339 /24160
- ^{1} French Land Register data, which excludes lakes, ponds, glaciers > 1 km^{2} (0.386 sq mi or 247 acres) and river estuaries.

Preyssac-d'Excideuil (French pronunciation: [pʁesak dɛksidœj]; Occitan: Preissac d'Eissiduelh) is a commune in the Dordogne department in Nouvelle-Aquitaine in southwestern France.

== Population ==
Historical population
Year	Pop.	±% p.a.
1968	118	—
1975	127	+1.06%
1982	136	+0.98%
1990	156	+1.73%
1999	114	−3.43%
2007	142	+2.78%
2012	167	+3.30%
2017	161	−0.73%
2023	152	−0.95%
Source: INSEE

== See also ==
- Communes of the Dordogne department
