= Sarrazac, Dordogne =

Sarrazac
- Commune
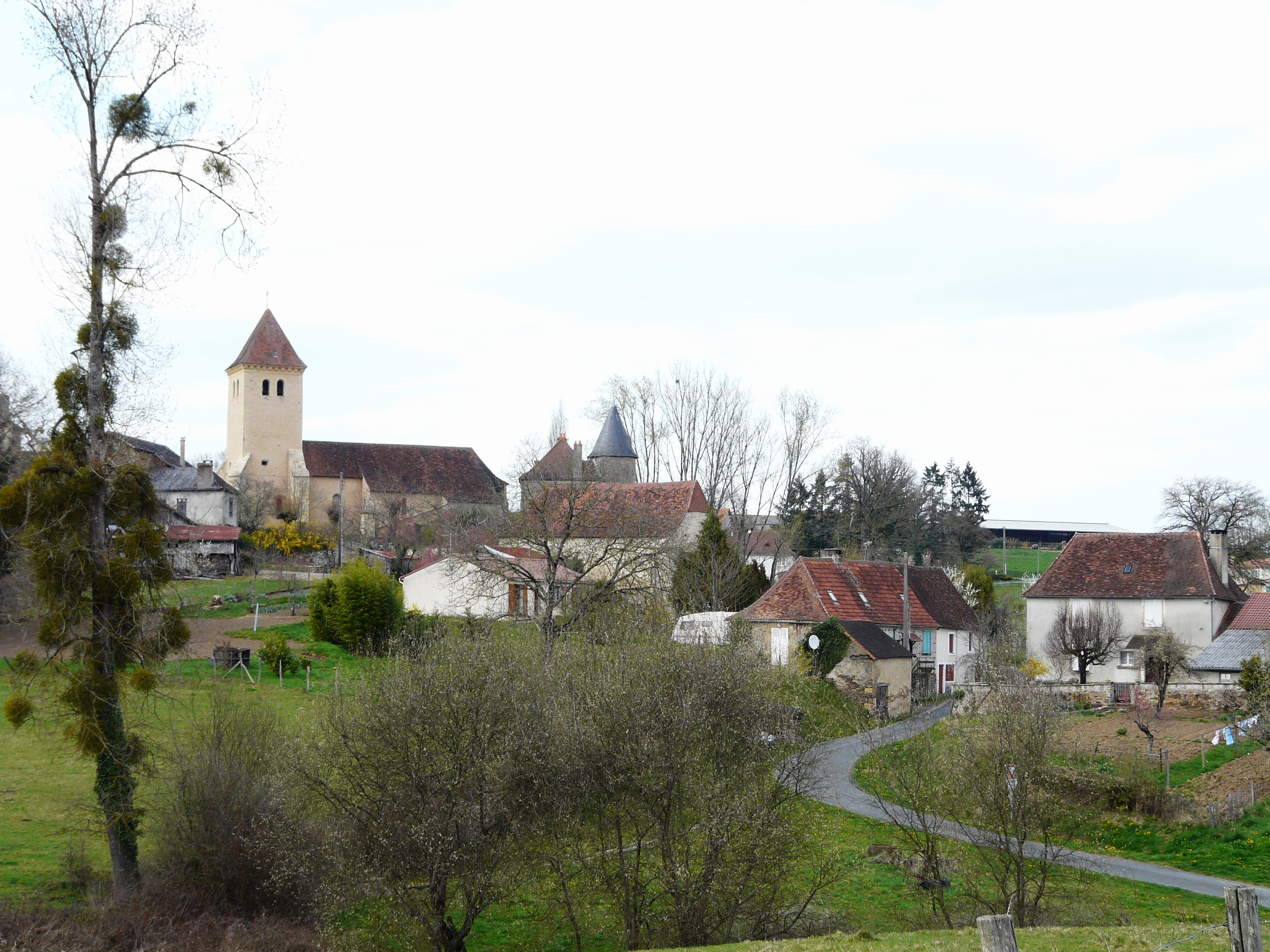
- A general view of Sarrazac
- Location of Sarrazac
- Location within France Location within Nouvelle-Aquitaine
- Coordinates: 45°26′14″N 1°01′50″E
- Country: France
- Region: Nouvelle-Aquitaine
- Department: Dordogne
- Arrondissement: Nontron
- Canton: Isle-Loue-Auvézère

Government
  - Mayor (2020–2026): Claudine Lafon
- Area^{1}: 29.89 km^{2} (11.54 sq mi)
- Elevation: 280 m (920 ft)
- Highest elevation: 349 m (1,145 ft)
- Lowest elevation: 155 m (509 ft)
- Population (2023): 363
  - Density: 12.1/km^{2} (31.5/sq mi)
- Time zone: UTC+01:00 (CET)
  - Summer (DST): UTC+02:00 (CEST)
- INSEE/Postal code: 24522 /24800
- ^{1} French Land Register data, which excludes lakes, ponds, glaciers > 1 km^{2} (0.386 sq mi or 247 acres) and river estuaries.

Sarrazac (French pronunciation: [saʁazak]; Occitan: Sarrasac) is a commune in the Dordogne department in Nouvelle-Aquitaine in southwestern France.

== Population ==
Historical population
Year	Pop.	±% p.a.
1968	750	—
1975	592	−3.32%
1982	526	−1.67%
1990	478	−1.19%
1999	404	−1.85%
2007	389	−0.47%
2012	369	−1.05%
2017	381	+0.64%
2023	363	−0.80%
Source: INSEE

== See also ==
- Communes of the Dordogne département
