= Angoisse =

- Commune
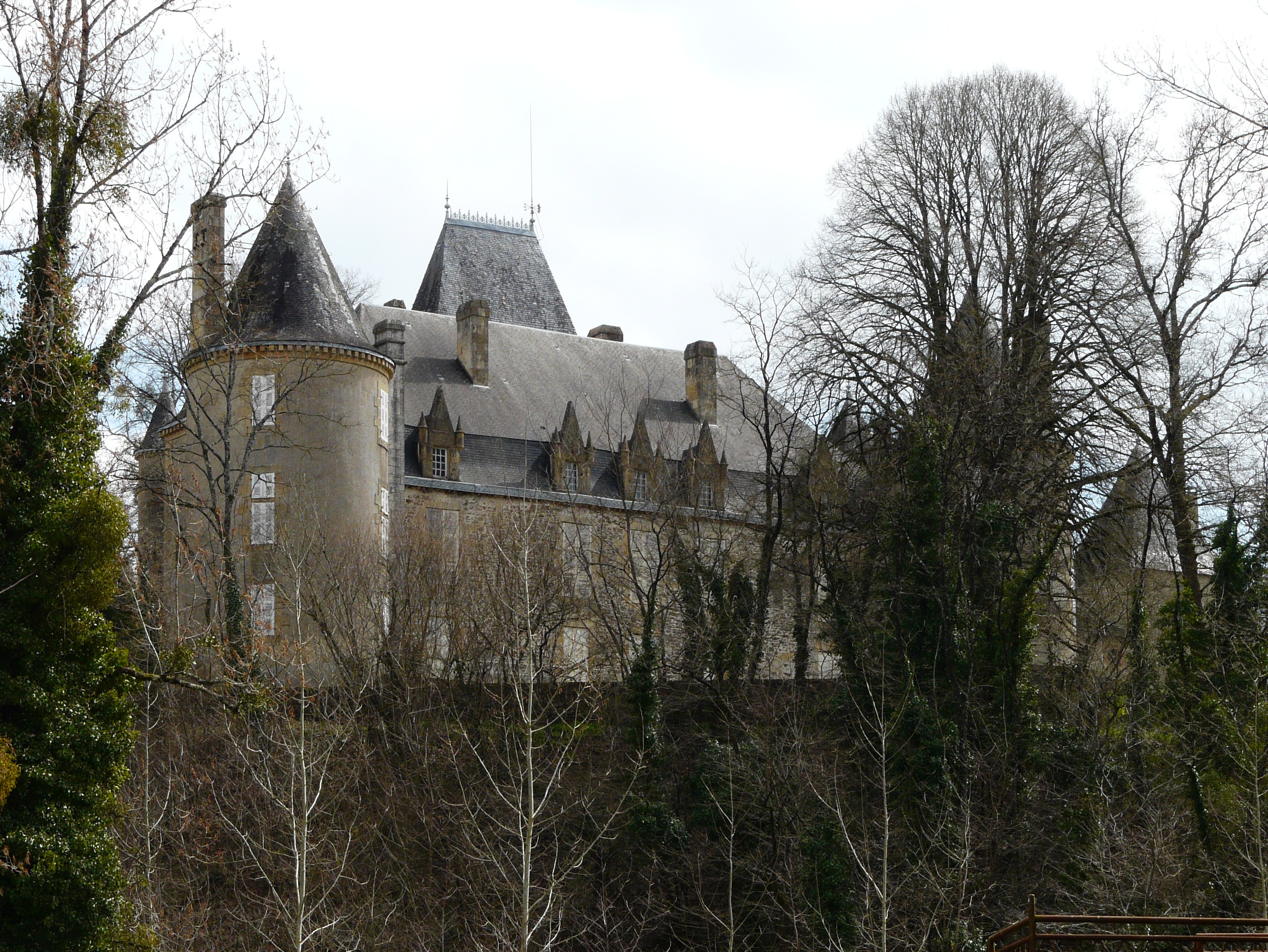
- Chateau of Rouffiac
- Location of Angoisse
- Location within France Location within Nouvelle-Aquitaine
- Coordinates: 45°25′41″N 1°08′17″E
- Country: France
- Region: Nouvelle-Aquitaine
- Department: Dordogne
- Arrondissement: Nontron
- Canton: Isle-Loue-Auvézère
- Intercommunality: Isle-Loue-Auvézère en Périgord

Government
  - Mayor (2020–2026): Joël Gadaud
- Area^{1}: 23.13 km^{2} (8.93 sq mi)
- Elevation: 341 m (1,119 ft)
- Highest elevation: 364 m (1,194 ft)
- Lowest elevation: 239 m (784 ft)
- Population (2023): 598
  - Density: 25.9/km^{2} (67.0/sq mi)
- Time zone: UTC+01:00 (CET)
  - Summer (DST): UTC+02:00 (CEST)
- INSEE/Postal code: 24008 /24270
- ^{1} French Land Register data, which excludes lakes, ponds, glaciers > 1 km^{2} (0.386 sq mi or 247 acres) and river estuaries.

Angoisse (French pronunciation: [ɑ̃ɡwas]; Occitan: Engoissa) is a commune in the Dordogne department in Nouvelle-Aquitaine in southwestern France.Angoisse translates to Anguish in English

== Population ==
Historical population
Year	Pop.	±% p.a.
1968	834	—
1975	721	−2.06%
1982	619	−2.16%
1990	559	−1.27%
1999	572	+0.26%
2007	602	+0.64%
2012	626	+0.78%
2017	588	−1.24%
2023	598	+0.28%
Source: INSEE

== See also ==
- Communes of the Dordogne department
