= Clermont-d'Excideuil =

- Commune
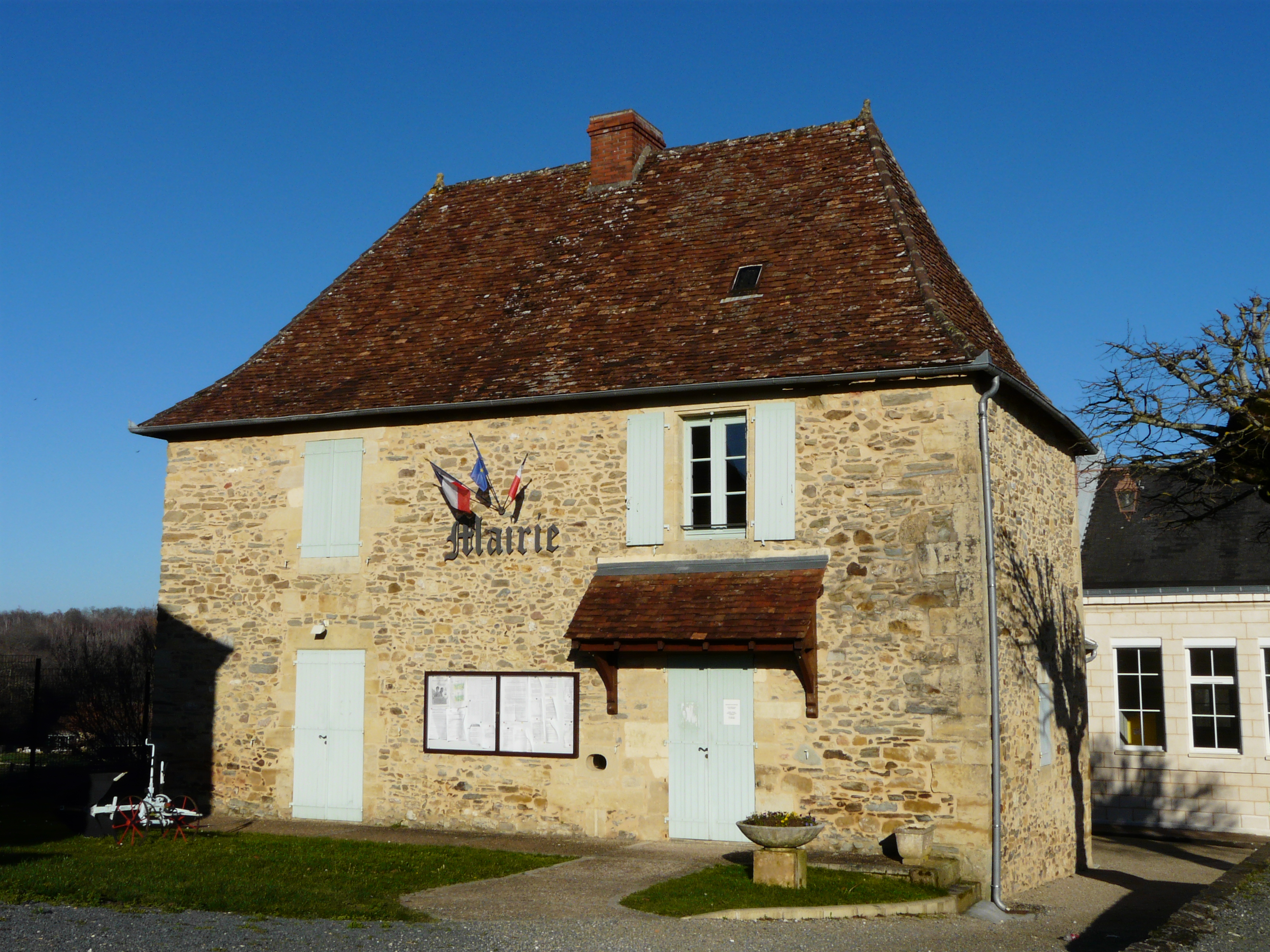
- Town hall
- Location of Clermont-d'Excideuil
- Location within France Location within Nouvelle-Aquitaine
- Coordinates: 45°21′57″N 1°03′07″E
- Country: France
- Region: Nouvelle-Aquitaine
- Department: Dordogne
- Arrondissement: Nontron
- Canton: Isle-Loue-Auvézère

Government
  - Mayor (2020–2026): Claude Eymery
- Area^{1}: 9.99 km^{2} (3.86 sq mi)
- Elevation: 260 m (850 ft)
- Highest elevation: 333 m (1,093 ft)
- Lowest elevation: 156 m (512 ft)
- Population (2023): 255
  - Density: 25.5/km^{2} (66.1/sq mi)
- Time zone: UTC+01:00 (CET)
  - Summer (DST): UTC+02:00 (CEST)
- INSEE/Postal code: 24124 /24160
- ^{1} French Land Register data, which excludes lakes, ponds, glaciers > 1 km^{2} (0.386 sq mi or 247 acres) and river estuaries.

Clermont-d'Excideuil (French pronunciation: [klɛʁmɔ̃ dɛksidœj], literally Clermont of Excideuil; Occitan: Clarmont d'Eissiduelh) is a commune in the Dordogne department in Nouvelle-Aquitaine in southwestern France.

== Population ==
Historical population
Year	Pop.	±% p.a.
1968	289	—
1975	253	−1.88%
1982	255	+0.11%
1990	255	+0.00%
1999	253	−0.09%
2007	270	+0.82%
2012	243	−2.09%
2017	232	−0.92%
2023	255	+1.59%
Source: INSEE

== History ==
Until the end of the 18th century, there was a number of megaliths in Clermont, aligned like those in Carnac. They stood between the hamlets La Valade to the north and Le Verdier to the south. The name of the locality Pierres Brunes is a reminder of the megaliths. They were exploited by blacksmiths, and nothing of them remains. Several modern historians place them on a great ancient commercial route between Vannes in Armorica and Marseille on the Mediterranean Sea via Mende.

== See also ==
- Communes of the Dordogne department
