= Saint-Médard-d'Excideuil =

- Commune
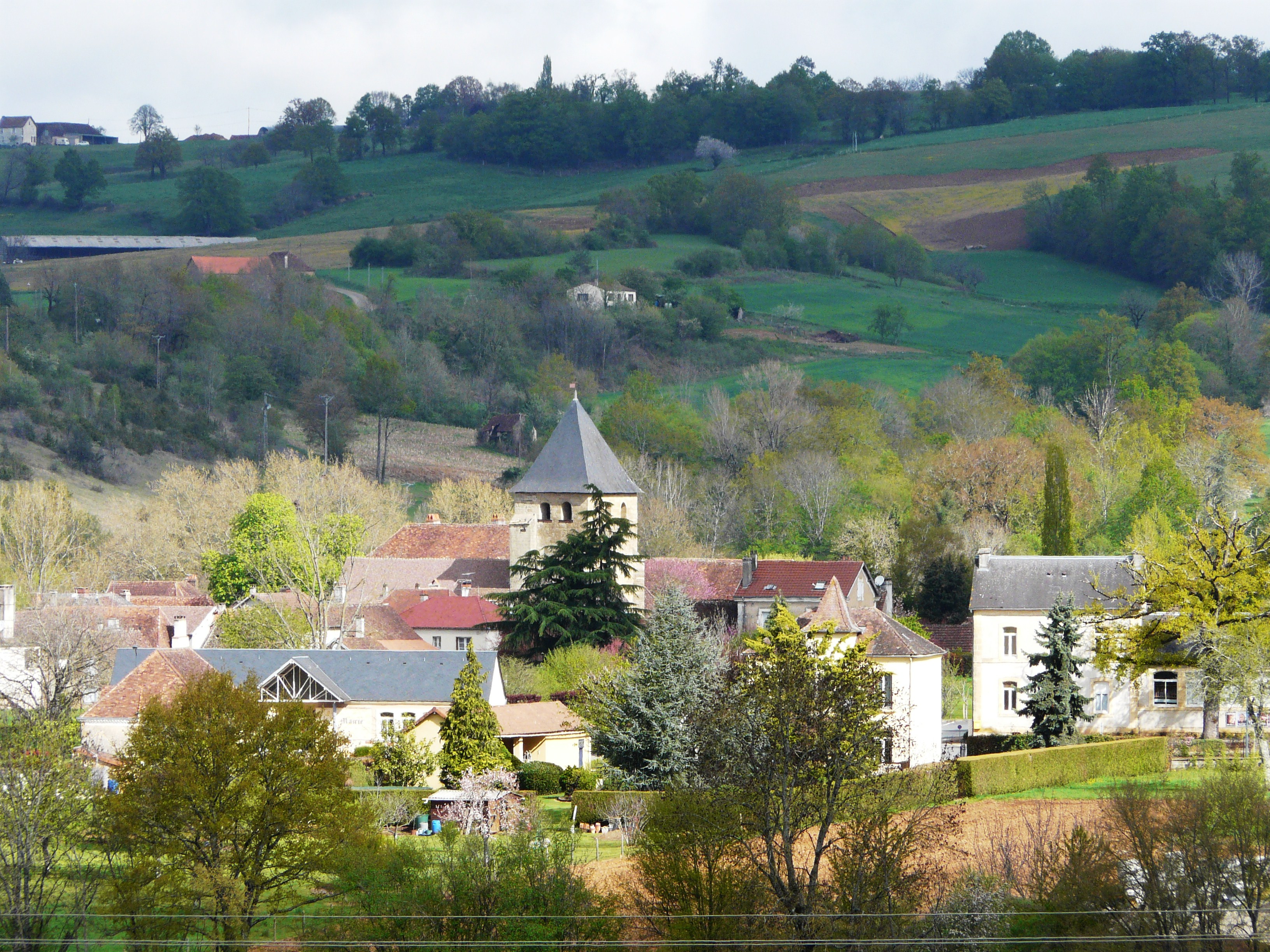
- A general view of Saint-Médard-d'Excideuil

- Coat of arms
- Location of Saint-Médard-d'Excideuil
- Location within France Location within Nouvelle-Aquitaine
- Coordinates: 45°20′33″N 1°04′18″E
- Country: France
- Region: Nouvelle-Aquitaine
- Department: Dordogne
- Arrondissement: Nontron
- Canton: Isle-Loue-Auvézère

Government
  - Mayor (2020–2026): Éric Villemaine
- Area^{1}: 18.35 km^{2} (7.08 sq mi)
- Elevation: 155 m (509 ft)
- Highest elevation: 322 m (1,056 ft)
- Lowest elevation: 145 m (476 ft)
- Population (2023): 546
  - Density: 29.8/km^{2} (77.1/sq mi)
- Time zone: UTC+01:00 (CET)
  - Summer (DST): UTC+02:00 (CEST)
- INSEE/Postal code: 24463 /24160
- ^{1} French Land Register data, which excludes lakes, ponds, glaciers > 1 km^{2} (0.386 sq mi or 247 acres) and river estuaries.

Saint-Médard-d'Excideuil (French pronunciation: [sɛ̃ medaʁ dɛksidœj]; Limousin: Sent Medard d'Eissiduelh) is a commune in the Dordogne department in Nouvelle-Aquitaine in southwestern France.

== History ==
In 1792, the commune of Gandumas merged with Saint-Médard-d'Excideuil.

== Population ==
Historical population
Year	Pop.	±% p.a.
1968	667	—
1975	658	−0.19%
1982	641	−0.37%
1990	665	+0.46%
1999	622	−0.74%
2007	615	−0.14%
2012	540	−2.57%
2017	546	+0.22%
2023	546	+0.00%
Source: INSEE

== See also ==
- Communes of the Dordogne department
