= Cantons of the Dordogne department =

The following is a list of the 25 cantons of the Dordogne department, in France, following the French canton reorganisation which came into effect in March 2015:

- Bergerac-1
- Bergerac-2
- Brantôme en Périgord
- Coulounieix-Chamiers
- Haut-Périgord Noir
- Isle-Loue-Auvézère
- Isle-Manoire
- Lalinde
- Montpon-Ménestérol
- Pays de la Force
- Pays de Montaigne et Gurson
- Périgord Central
- Périgord Vert Nontronnais
- Périgueux-1
- Périgueux-2
- Ribérac
- Saint-Astier
- Sarlat-la-Canéda
- Sud-Bergeracois
- Terrasson-Lavilledieu
- Thiviers
- Trélissac
- Vallée Dordogne
- Vallée de l'Isle
- Vallée de l'Homme
