= Anlhiac =

- Commune
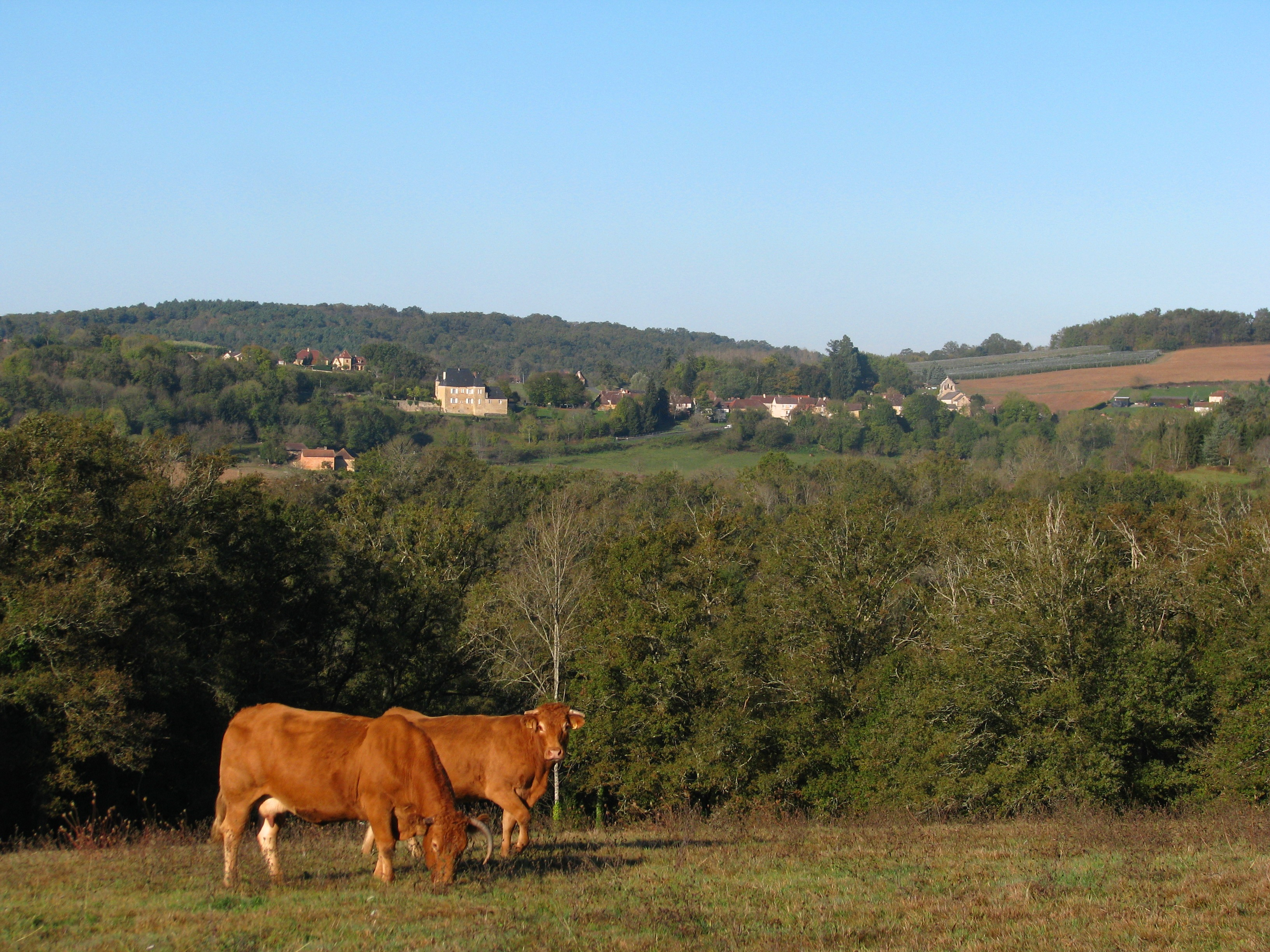
- A general view of Anlhiac

- Coat of arms
- Location of Anlhiac
- Location within France Location within Nouvelle-Aquitaine
- Coordinates: 45°19′21″N 1°07′37″E
- Country: France
- Region: Nouvelle-Aquitaine
- Department: Dordogne
- Arrondissement: Nontron
- Canton: Isle-Loue-Auvézère

Government
  - Mayor (2020–2026): Philippe Faure
- Area^{1}: 11.86 km^{2} (4.58 sq mi)
- Elevation: 236 m (774 ft)
- Highest elevation: 333 m (1,093 ft)
- Lowest elevation: 141 m (463 ft)
- Population (2023): 264
  - Density: 22.3/km^{2} (57.7/sq mi)
- Time zone: UTC+01:00 (CET)
  - Summer (DST): UTC+02:00 (CEST)
- INSEE/Postal code: 24009 /24160
- ^{1} French Land Register data, which excludes lakes, ponds, glaciers > 1 km^{2} (0.386 sq mi or 247 acres) and river estuaries.

Anlhiac (French pronunciation: [ɑ̃ljak]; Occitan: Anlhac) is a commune in the Dordogne department in Nouvelle-Aquitaine in southwestern France.

== Population ==
Historical population
Year	Pop.	±% p.a.
1968	347	—
1975	303	−1.92%
1982	330	+1.23%
1990	269	−2.52%
1999	300	+1.22%
2007	283	−0.73%
2012	291	+0.56%
2017	275	−1.12%
2023	264	−0.68%
Source: INSEE

== Sights ==
- Château d'Anlhiac
- Slate quarries

== See also ==
- Communes of the Dordogne department
