= Saint-Germain-des-Prés, Dordogne =

Saint-Germain-des-Prés
- Commune
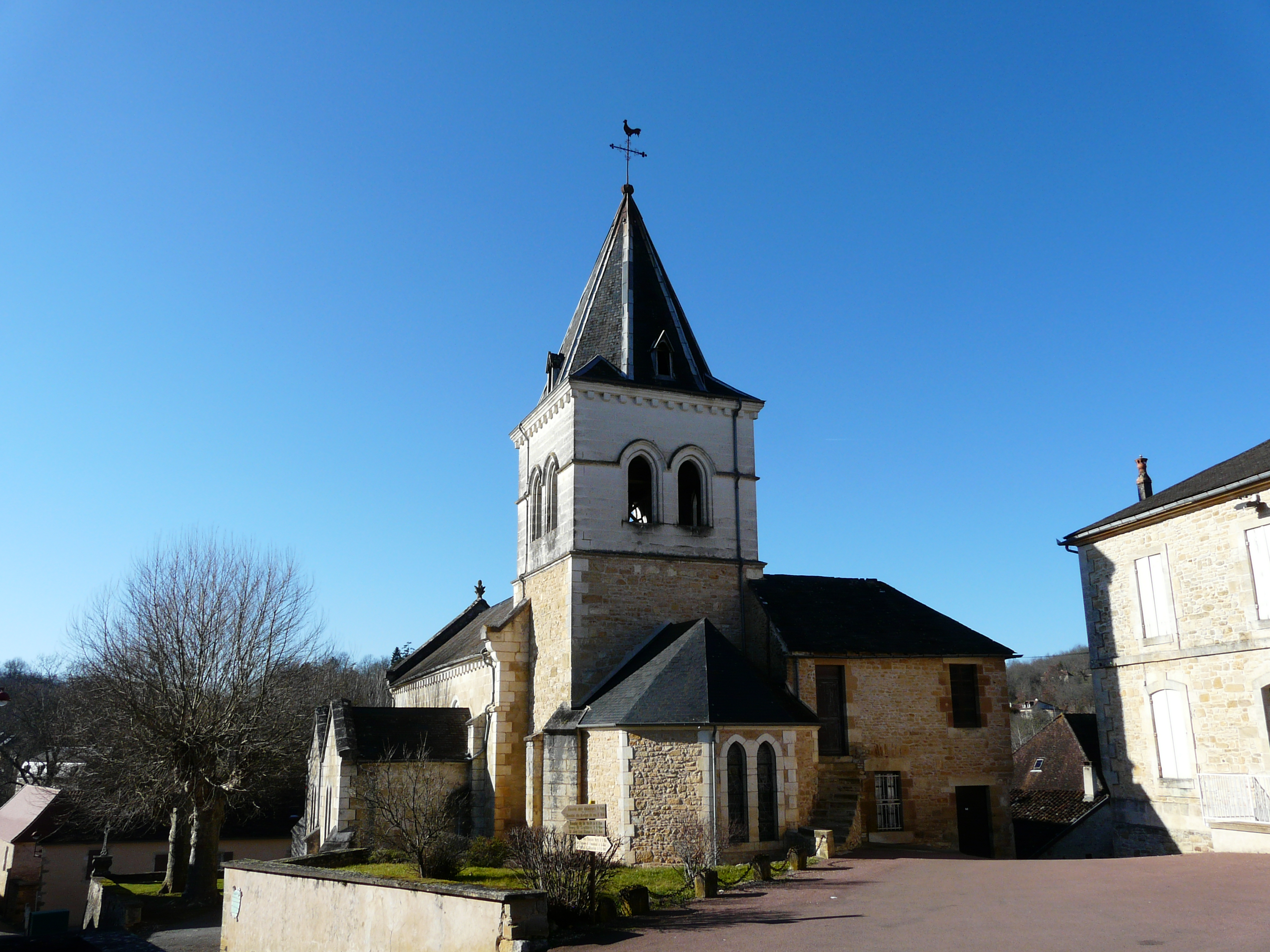
- Church of St. Germain
- Location of Saint-Germain-des-Prés
- Location within France Location within Nouvelle-Aquitaine
- Coordinates: 45°20′34″N 0°59′31″E
- Country: France
- Region: Nouvelle-Aquitaine
- Department: Dordogne
- Arrondissement: Nontron
- Canton: Isle-Loue-Auvézère

Government
  - Mayor (2020–2026): Jean-Pierre Valentin
- Area^{1}: 19.01 km^{2} (7.34 sq mi)
- Elevation: 150 m (490 ft)
- Highest elevation: 297 m (974 ft)
- Lowest elevation: 127 m (417 ft)
- Population (2023): 503
  - Density: 26.5/km^{2} (68.5/sq mi)
- Time zone: UTC+01:00 (CET)
  - Summer (DST): UTC+02:00 (CEST)
- INSEE/Postal code: 24417 /24160
- ^{1} French Land Register data, which excludes lakes, ponds, glaciers > 1 km^{2} (0.386 sq mi or 247 acres) and river estuaries.

Saint-Germain-des-Prés (French pronunciation: [sɛ̃ ʒɛʁmɛ̃ de pʁe]; Occitan: Sent Gèrman daus Prats) is a commune in the Dordogne department in Nouvelle-Aquitaine in southwestern France.

== History ==
On the night of 13–14 June 2007, a flash flood caused by a storm turned the river Ravillou and its tributary Merdanson into devastating torrents, that damaged the town and the bridge across the Ravillou.

== Population ==
Historical population
| Year | Pop. | ±% p.a. |
|---|---|---|
| 1968 | 582 | — |
| 1975 | 542 | −1.01% |
| 1982 | 537 | −0.13% |
| 1990 | 508 | −0.69% |
| 1999 | 467 | −0.93% |
| 2007 | 497 | +0.78% |
| 2012 | 528 | +1.22% |
| 2017 | 498 | −1.16% |
| 2023 | 503 | +0.17% |
Source: INSEE

== See also ==
- Communes of the Dordogne department
