= Nanthiat =

- Commune
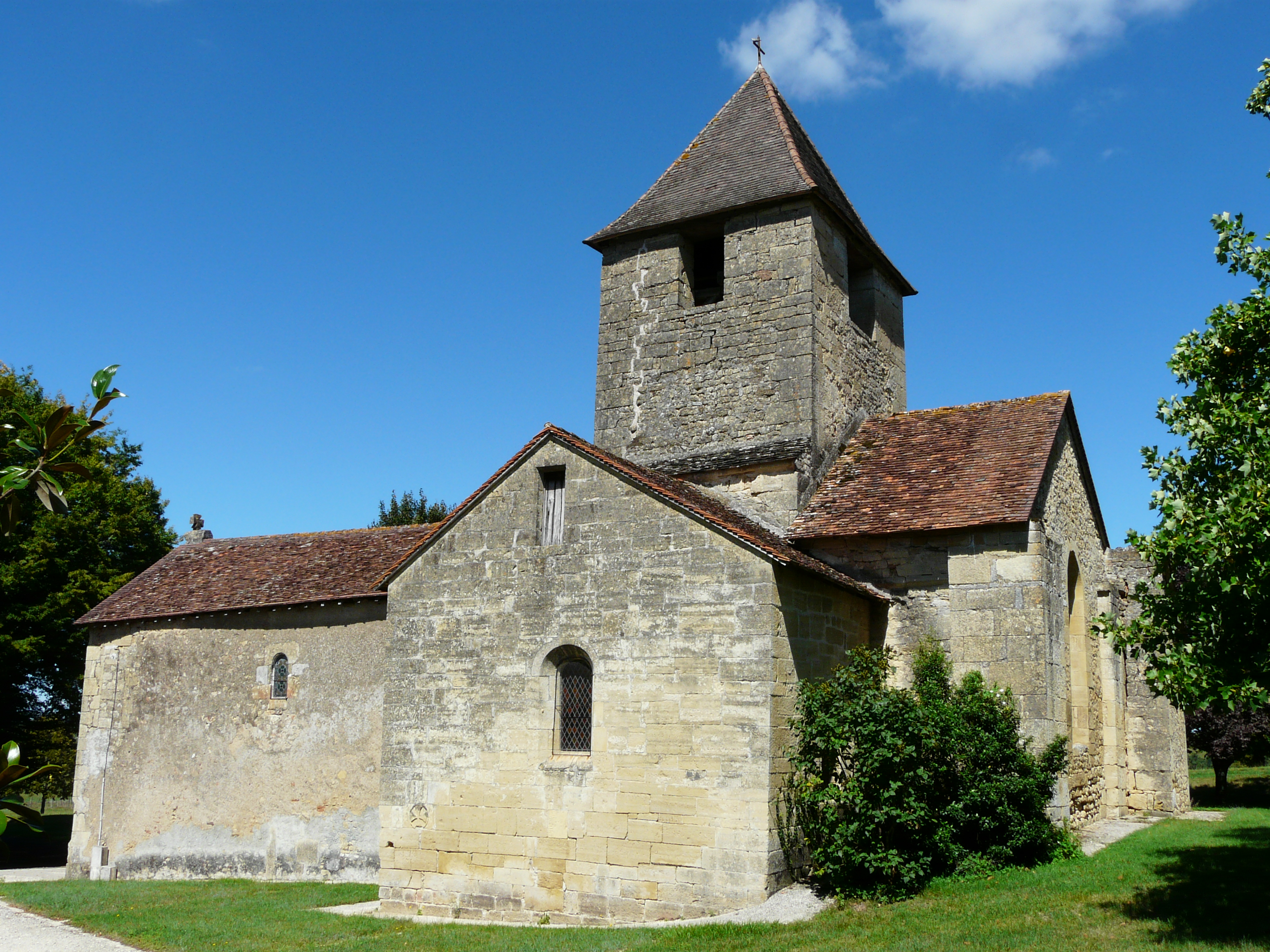
- The church in Nanthiat
- Location of Nanthiat
- Location within France Location within Nouvelle-Aquitaine
- Coordinates: 45°24′32″N 0°59′11″E
- Country: France
- Region: Nouvelle-Aquitaine
- Department: Dordogne
- Arrondissement: Nontron
- Canton: Thiviers

Government
  - Mayor (2020–2026): Paul Meynier
- Area^{1}: 11.12 km^{2} (4.29 sq mi)
- Elevation: 260 m (850 ft)
- Highest elevation: 313 m (1,027 ft)
- Lowest elevation: 136 m (446 ft)
- Population (2023): 244
  - Density: 21.9/km^{2} (56.8/sq mi)
- Time zone: UTC+01:00 (CET)
  - Summer (DST): UTC+02:00 (CEST)
- INSEE/Postal code: 24305 /24800
- ^{1} French Land Register data, which excludes lakes, ponds, glaciers > 1 km^{2} (0.386 sq mi or 247 acres) and river estuaries.

Nanthiat (French pronunciation: [nɑ̃tja]; Occitan: Nantiac) is a commune in the Dordogne department in Nouvelle-Aquitaine in southwestern France.

== Population ==
Historical population
Year	Pop.	±% p.a.
1968	356	—
1975	336	−0.82%
1982	336	+0.00%
1990	337	+0.04%
1999	291	−1.62%
2007	283	−0.35%
2012	263	−1.46%
2017	239	−1.90%
2023	244	+0.35%
Source: INSEE

== Sights ==
- Château de Nanthiat, 16th-18th centuries, designated historic site

== See also ==
- Communes of the Dordogne department
