= Cantons of Périgueux =

Division of the town of Périguex, Dordogne, France

Coordinates: 45.19°N 0.72°E

The cantons of Périgueux are administrative divisions of the Dordogne department, in southwestern France. Since the French canton reorganisation which came into effect in March 2015, the town of Périgueux is subdivided into 2 cantons. Their seat is in Périgueux.

== Population ==
Name	Population (2019)	Cantonal Code
Canton of Périgueux-1	15,516	2414
Canton of Périgueux-2	14,380	2415
