= Saint-Martial-d'Albarède =

- Commune
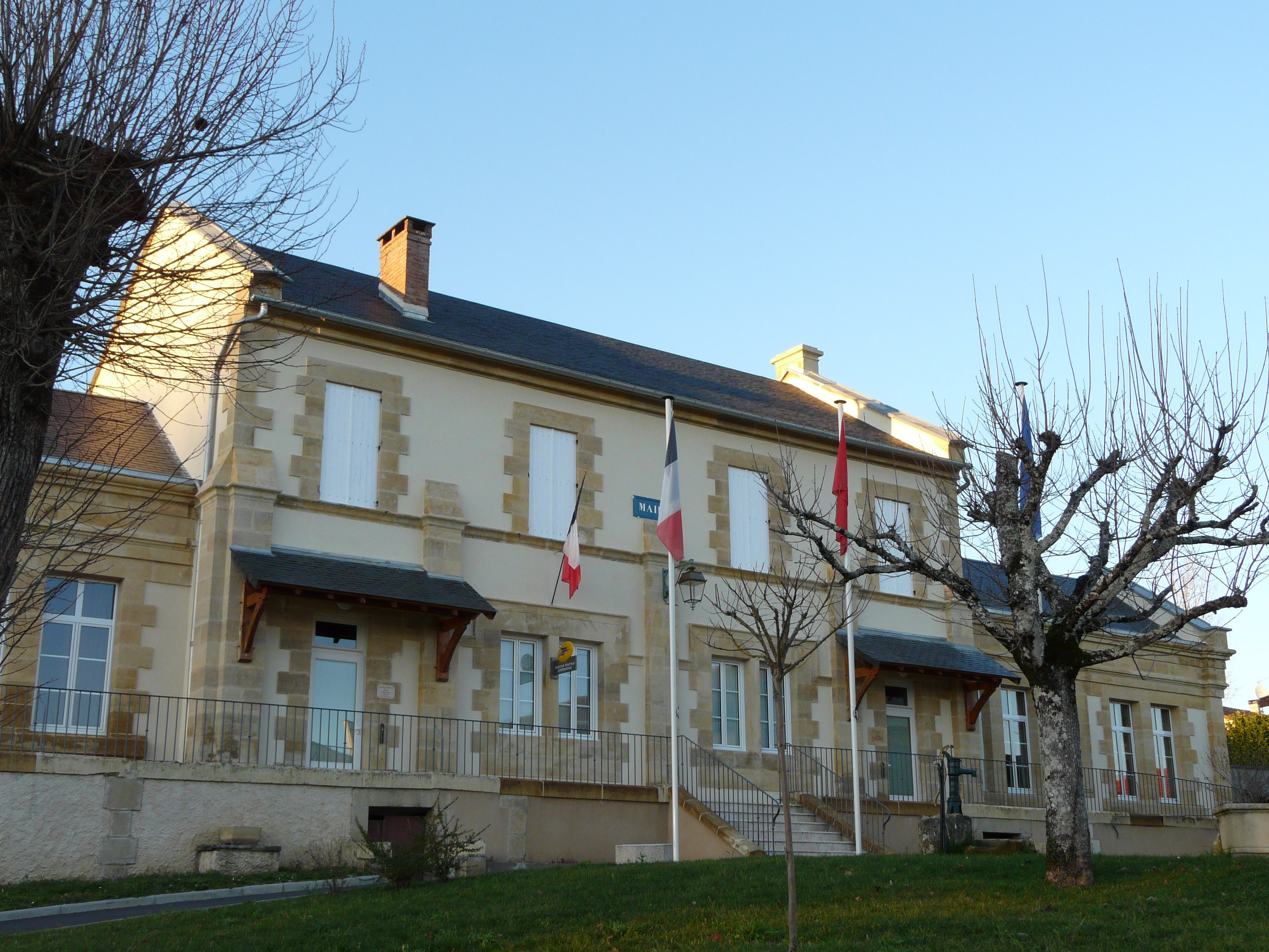
- The town hall in Saint-Martial-d'Albarède

- Coat of arms
- Location of Saint-Martial-d'Albarède
- Location within France Location within Nouvelle-Aquitaine
- Coordinates: 45°19′33″N 1°01′54″E
- Country: France
- Region: Nouvelle-Aquitaine
- Department: Dordogne
- Arrondissement: Nontron
- Canton: Isle-Loue-Auvézère

Government
  - Mayor (2020–2026): Francis Cipierre
- Area^{1}: 10.28 km^{2} (3.97 sq mi)
- Elevation: 144 m (472 ft)
- Highest elevation: 286 m (938 ft)
- Lowest elevation: 132 m (433 ft)
- Population (2023): 484
  - Density: 47.1/km^{2} (122/sq mi)
- Time zone: UTC+01:00 (CET)
  - Summer (DST): UTC+02:00 (CEST)
- INSEE/Postal code: 24448 /24160
- ^{1} French Land Register data, which excludes lakes, ponds, glaciers > 1 km^{2} (0.386 sq mi or 247 acres) and river estuaries.

Saint-Martial-d'Albarède (French pronunciation: [sɛ̃ maʁsjal dalbaʁɛd]; Occitan: Sent Marçau d'Aubareda) is a commune in the Dordogne department in Nouvelle-Aquitaine in southwestern France.

== Population ==
Historical population
Year	Pop.	±% p.a.
1968	420	—
1975	368	−1.87%
1982	377	+0.35%
1990	394	+0.55%
1999	403	+0.25%
2007	445	+1.25%
2012	490	+1.95%
2017	464	−1.08%
2023	484	+0.71%
Source: INSEE

== See also ==
- Communes of the Dordogne department
