= Saint-Sulpice-d'Excideuil =

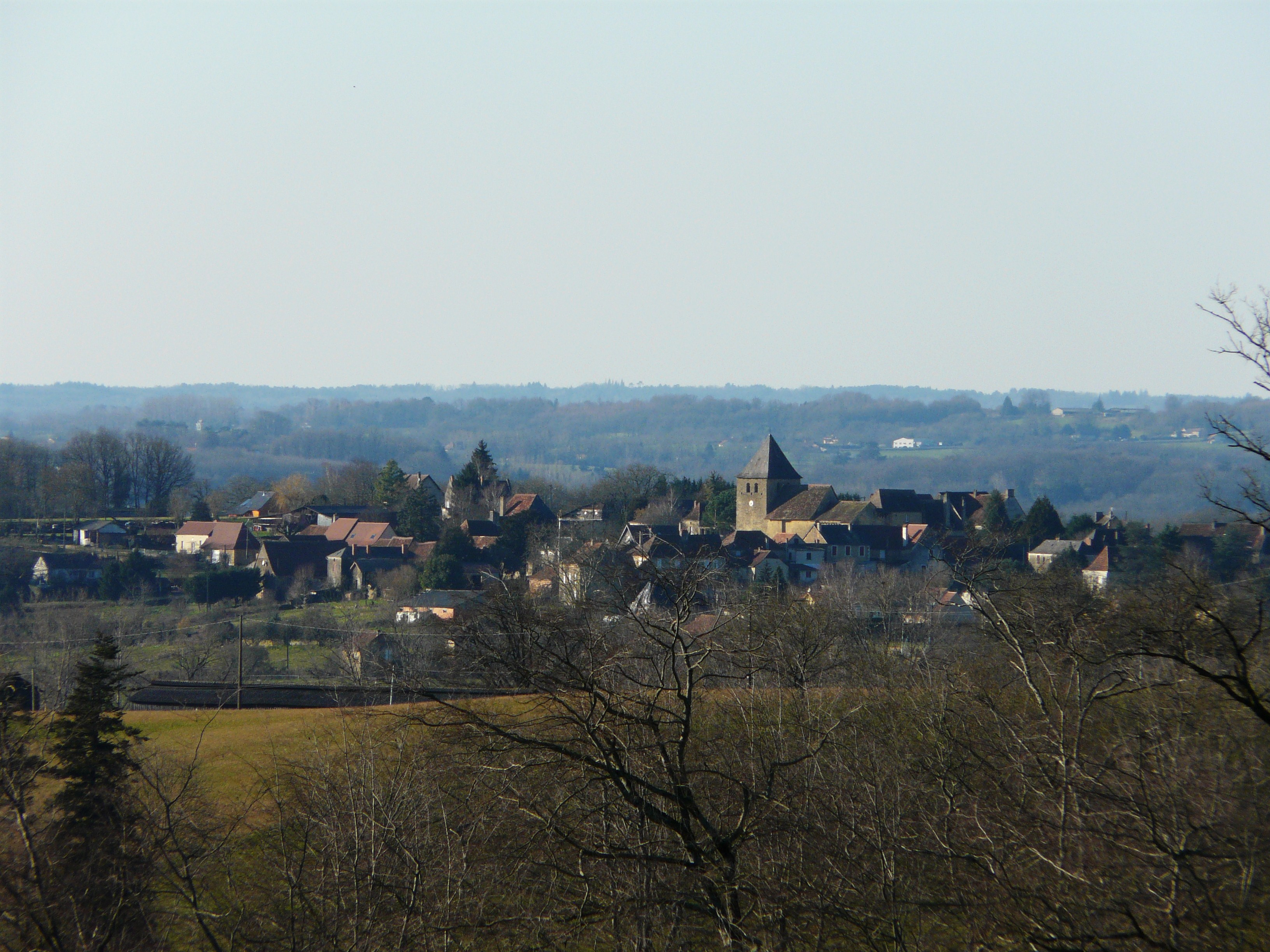
- Location of Saint-Sulpice-d'Excideuil
- Location within France Location within Nouvelle-Aquitaine
- Coordinates: 45°23′25″N 1°00′27″E
- Country: France
- Region: Nouvelle-Aquitaine
- Department: Dordogne
- Arrondissement: Nontron
- Canton: Isle-Loue-Auvézère

Government
  - Mayor (2020–2026): Philippe Caillaud
- Area^{1}: 19.72 km^{2} (7.61 sq mi)
- Elevation: 280 m (920 ft)
- Highest elevation: 327 m (1,073 ft)
- Lowest elevation: 159 m (522 ft)
- Population (2023): 377
  - Density: 19.1/km^{2} (49.5/sq mi)
- Time zone: UTC+01:00 (CET)
  - Summer (DST): UTC+02:00 (CEST)
- INSEE/Postal code: 24505 /24800
- ^{1} French Land Register data, which excludes lakes, ponds, glaciers > 1 km^{2} (0.386 sq mi or 247 acres) and river estuaries.

Saint-Sulpice-d'Excideuil (French pronunciation: [sɛ̃ sylpis dɛksidœj], literally Saint-Sulpice of Excideuil; Limousin: Sent Soplesí d'Eissiduelh, or Sent Soplesís d'Eissiduelh) is a commune in the Dordogne department in Aquitaine in southwestern France. It is located about 40 km north east of Perigueux.

== Population ==
Historical population
Year	Pop.	±% p.a.
1968	591	—
1975	491	−2.61%
1982	432	−1.81%
1990	406	−0.77%
1999	355	−1.48%
2007	324	−1.14%
2012	308	−1.01%
2017	344	+2.24%
2023	377	+1.54%
Source: INSEE

== See also ==
- Communes of the Dordogne department
