= Saint-Cyr-les-Champagnes =

- Commune
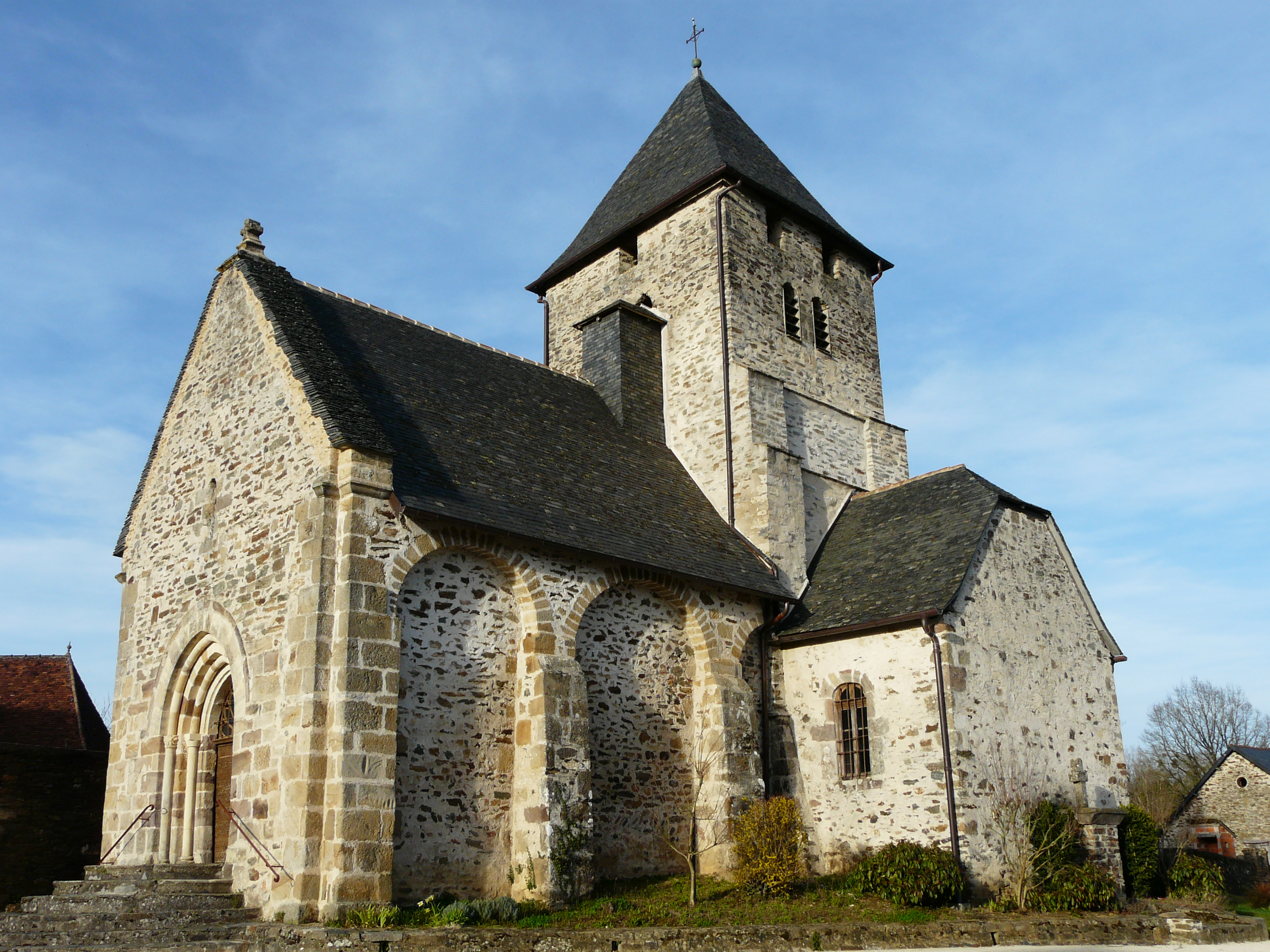
- The church in Saint-Cyr-les-Champagnes

- Coat of arms
- Location of Saint-Cyr-les-Champagnes
- Location within France Location within Nouvelle-Aquitaine
- Coordinates: 45°22′47″N 1°17′21″E
- Country: France
- Region: Nouvelle-Aquitaine
- Department: Dordogne
- Arrondissement: Nontron
- Canton: Isle-Loue-Auvézère

Government
  - Mayor (2020–2026): Alain Pierrefitte
- Area^{1}: 15.81 km^{2} (6.10 sq mi)
- Elevation: 385 m (1,263 ft)
- Highest elevation: 415 m (1,362 ft)
- Lowest elevation: 274 m (899 ft)
- Population (2023): 304
  - Density: 19.2/km^{2} (49.8/sq mi)
- Time zone: UTC+01:00 (CET)
  - Summer (DST): UTC+02:00 (CEST)
- INSEE/Postal code: 24397 /24270
- ^{1} French Land Register data, which excludes lakes, ponds, glaciers > 1 km^{2} (0.386 sq mi or 247 acres) and river estuaries.

Saint-Cyr-les-Champagnes (Occitan: Sant Cyr lo Champanhas) is a commune in the Dordogne department in Nouvelle-Aquitaine in southwestern France. It has an 11th-12th century romanesque church, dedicated to Saint-Cyr and Sainte-Juliette.

== Population ==
Historical population
Year	Pop.	±% p.a.
1968	457	—
1975	380	−2.60%
1982	339	−1.62%
1990	313	−0.99%
1999	295	−0.66%
2007	276	−0.83%
2012	280	+0.29%
2017	244	−2.71%
2023	304	+3.73%
Source: INSEE

== See also ==
- Communes of the Dordogne department
