= Dussac =

- Commune
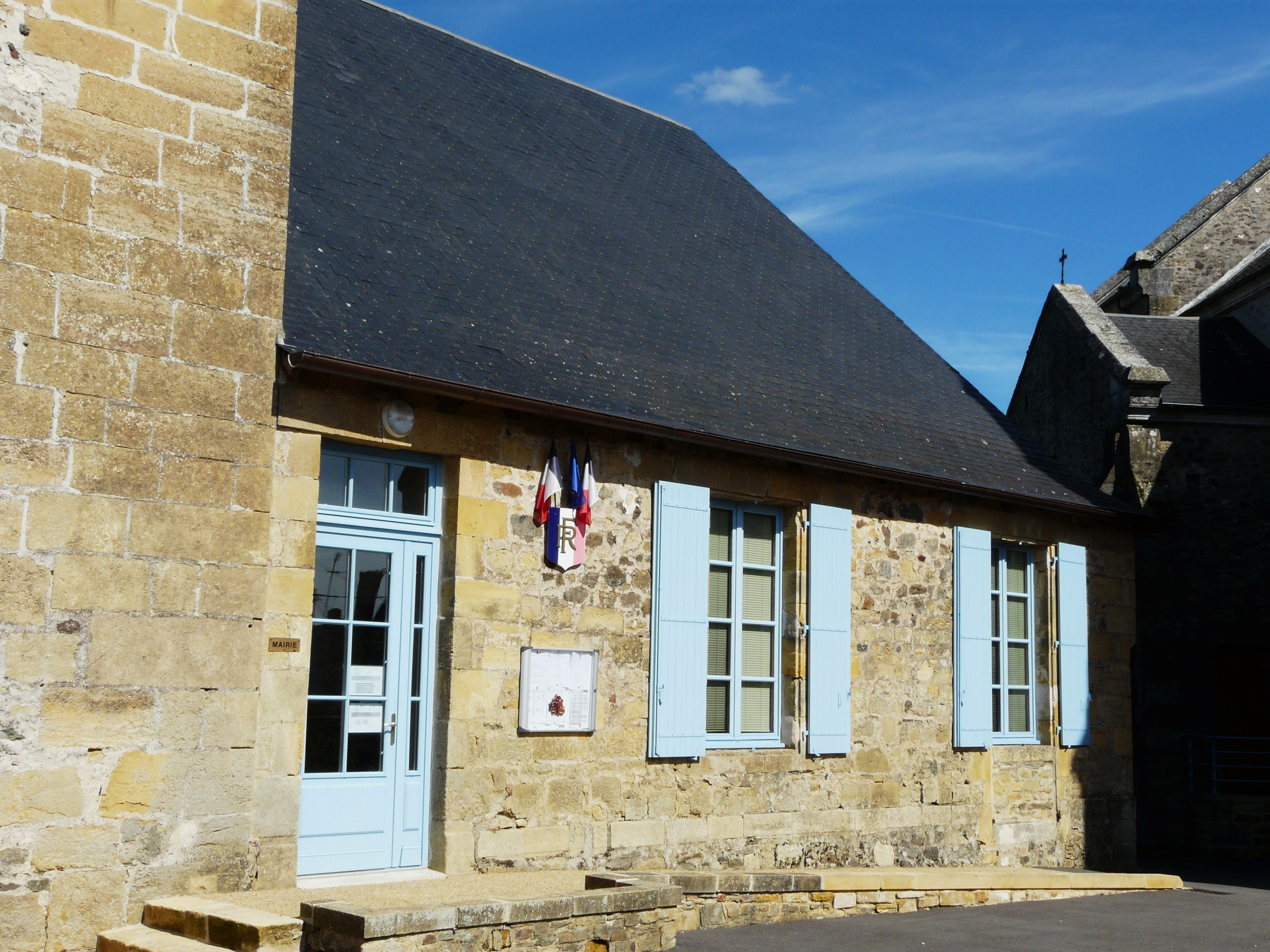
- The town hall in Dussac
- Location of Dussac
- Location within France Location within Nouvelle-Aquitaine
- Coordinates: 45°23′46″N 1°04′57″E
- Country: France
- Region: Nouvelle-Aquitaine
- Department: Dordogne
- Arrondissement: Nontron
- Canton: Isle-Loue-Auvézère

Government
  - Mayor (2020–2026): Philippe Rousseau
- Area^{1}: 20.26 km^{2} (7.82 sq mi)
- Elevation: 272 m (892 ft)
- Highest elevation: 347 m (1,138 ft)
- Lowest elevation: 198 m (650 ft)
- Population (2023): 427
  - Density: 21.1/km^{2} (54.6/sq mi)
- Time zone: UTC+01:00 (CET)
  - Summer (DST): UTC+02:00 (CEST)
- INSEE/Postal code: 24158 /24270
- ^{1} French Land Register data, which excludes lakes, ponds, glaciers > 1 km^{2} (0.386 sq mi or 247 acres) and river estuaries.

Dussac (French pronunciation: [dysak]; Occitan: Dussac) is a commune in the Dordogne department in Nouvelle-Aquitaine in southwestern France.

== Population ==
Historical population
Year	Pop.	±% p.a.
1968	560	—
1975	512	−1.27%
1982	460	−1.52%
1990	431	−0.81%
1999	419	−0.31%
2007	366	−1.68%
2012	409	+2.25%
2017	404	−0.25%
2023	427	+0.93%
Source: INSEE

== Sights ==
- Château de Dussac, listed historic site

== See also ==
- Communes of the Dordogne department
