= Eyliac =

- Part of Bassillac et Auberoche
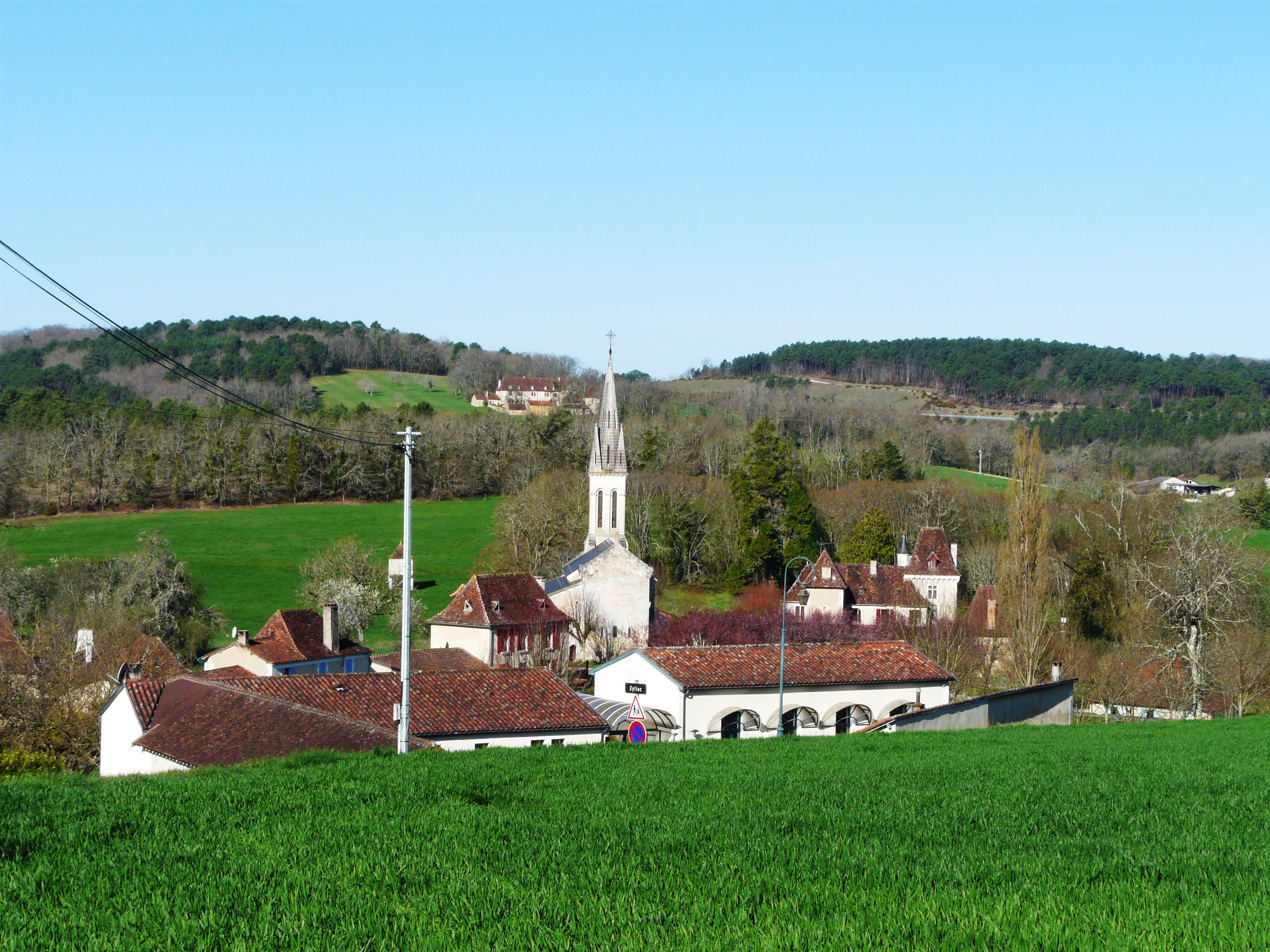
- Location of Eyliac
- Location within France Location within Nouvelle-Aquitaine
- Coordinates: 45°09′44″N 0°51′21″E
- Country: France
- Region: Nouvelle-Aquitaine
- Department: Dordogne
- Arrondissement: Périgueux
- Canton: Isle-Manoire
- Commune: Bassillac et Auberoche
- Area^{1}: 22.74 km^{2} (8.78 sq mi)
- Elevation: 144 m (472 ft)
- Highest elevation: 251 m (823 ft)
- Lowest elevation: 92 m (302 ft)
- Population (2023): 719
  - Density: 31.6/km^{2} (81.9/sq mi)
- Time zone: UTC+01:00 (CET)
  - Summer (DST): UTC+02:00 (CEST)
- Postal code: 24330
- ^{1} French Land Register data, which excludes lakes, ponds, glaciers > 1 km^{2} (0.386 sq mi or 247 acres) and river estuaries.

Eyliac (French pronunciation: [ɛljak]; Occitan: Eilhac) is a former commune in the Dordogne department in Nouvelle-Aquitaine in southwestern France. On 1 January 2017, it was merged into the new commune Bassillac et Auberoche.

== See also ==
- Château d'Eyliac
- Communes of the Dordogne department
- Château de la Chalupie
