= Auvézère =

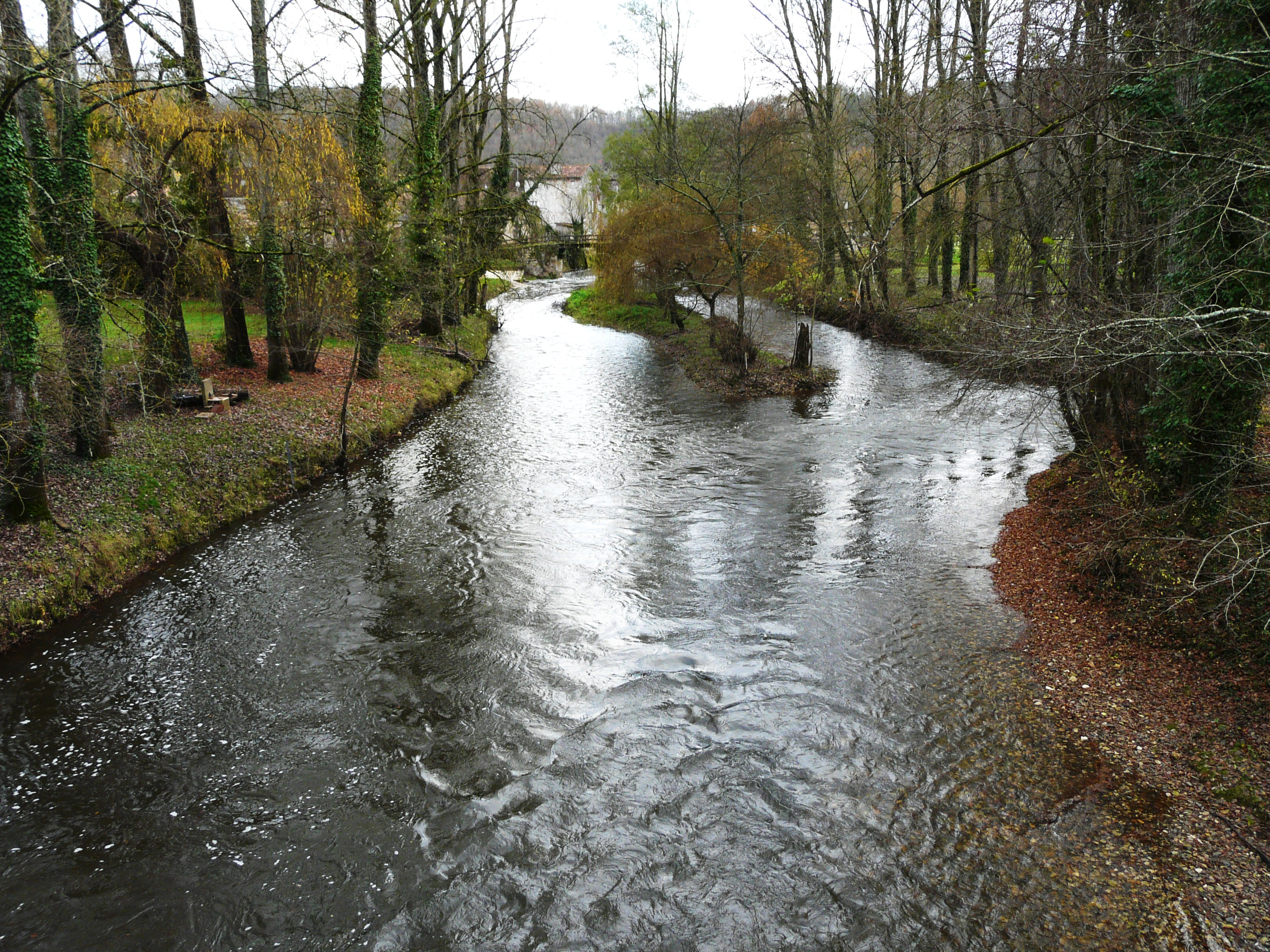

- Location within France Location within Nouvelle-Aquitaine

Location
- Country: France

Physical characteristics
- Source
  - location: Limousin
  - elevation: 480 m (1,570 ft)
- Mouth
  - location: Isle
  - coordinates: 45°11′43″N 0°50′25″E
- Length: 112 km (70 mi)
- Basin size: 900 km^{2} (350 sq mi)
- Discharge
  - average: 8.52 m^{3}/s (301 cu ft/s)

Basin features
- Progression: Isle→ Dordogne→ Gironde estuary→ Atlantic Ocean

The Auvézère (French pronunciation: [ovezɛʁ]; Occitan dialect: Auvesera) is a 112 km long river in the Nouvelle-Aquitaine region of France. It is a tributary of the river Isle, which is itself a tributary of the Dordogne.

== Geography ==
The river begins at 480 metres (1,570 ft) above sea level at the northwestern edge of the Massif Central mountains, south of Saint-Germain-les-Belles in the Haute-Vienne department. The river runs in a generally southwestern direction, passing through the Corrèze and Dordogne departments. It flows into the river Isle in Bassillac. Near Cubjac, at the Moulin de Soucis, part of its water is diverged to the Isle.

=== Communes ===
The river passes through the following communes:

- Haute-Vienne: Saint-Germain-les-Belles
- Corrèze: Benayes, Lubersac, Ségur-le-Château
- Dordogne: Payzac, Savignac-Lédrier, Saint-Mesmin, Génis, Cherveix-Cubas, Tourtoirac, Cubjac, Le Change, Bassillac

=== Tributaries ===
- Penchennerie, right
- Boucheuse, right
- Belles-Dames, left
- Dalon, right
- Lourde, right
- Blâme, right

== Hydrology ==
Like most of the rivers that rise in the heights of Limousin, the Auvézère is a water-rich river. Its flow has been observed during the period of 27 years (between 1982 and 2008) at Le Change, just upstream of its confluence with the Isle. The mean annual flow at this station was 8.52 m^{3}/s. The Auvézère is a seasonal river with the highest flows during winter and early spring. The median flows between December and April lie between 12.2 and 16.8 m^{3}/s. In spring the flow rapidly decreases to 4.62 m^{3}/s in June. The lowest flow is observed in August: 1.87 m^{3}/s. The lowest three-day average flow is only 0.22 m^{3}/s. The highest calculated flow is 250 m^{3}/s, and the highest observed flow at Le Change was 182 m^{3}/s on January 7, 1982.

The Auvézère is not as water-rich as other rivers of the basin of the Dordogne, that drain more eastern areas of the Massif Central. The surface runoff of the Auvézère basin is 310 mm per year, which is close to the French average, but much less than that of the Dordogne (623 mm in Bergerac) and the Vézère (590 mm in Montignac). The specific flow of the Auvézère is 9.8 litre per second per square kilometre basin.

== See also ==
- List of rivers of France
