= Soue =

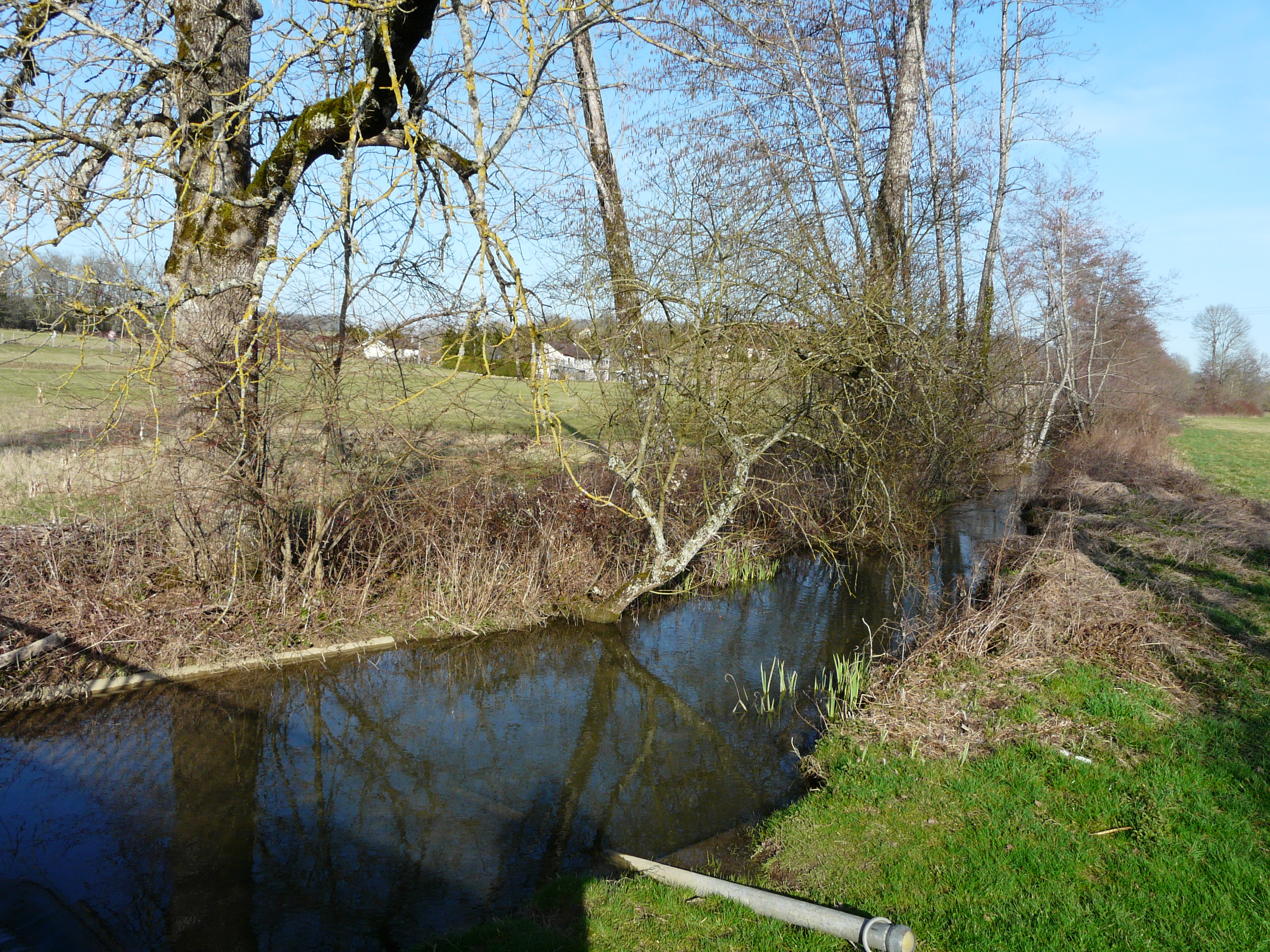

- Location within France Location within Nouvelle-Aquitaine

Location
- Country: France

Physical characteristics
- Source
  - location: Dordogne
- Mouth
  - location: Blâme
  - coordinates: 45°12′12″N 1°0′7″E
- Length: 12 km (7.5 mi)

Basin features
- Progression: Blâme→ Auvézère→ Isle→ Dordogne→ Gironde estuary→ Atlantic Ocean

The Soue is a small river in the Dordogne department of France. It is a tributary of the Blâme and part of the Dordogne basin. It is 11.9 km (7.4 mi) long. The river rises in the commune of Granges-d'Ans, flows through Sainte-Orse and empties into the Blâme on its right bank, near Brouchaud.

== See also ==
- List of rivers of France
