= Valentine (river) =

- Location within France Location within Nouvelle-Aquitaine

Location
- Country: France

Physical characteristics
- Source
  - location: Haute-Vienne
- Mouth
  - location: Boucheuse
  - coordinates: 45°29′33″N 1°18′53″E
- Length: 12 km (7.5 mi)

Basin features
- Progression: Boucheuse→ Auvézère→ Isle→ Dordogne→ Gironde estuary→ Atlantic Ocean

The Valentine (in its upper course: Ruisseau de Drouly and Ruisseau de Marsaguet) is a stream in the Haute-Vienne department, France. It is a tributary of the Boucheuse, and part of the Dordogne basin. It is 12.3 km (7.6 mi) long.

The river begins in the commune of La Roche-l'Abeille and joins the Boucheuse at its right bank 3 km south of Coussac-Bonneval.
