= Savignac-Lédrier =

- Commune
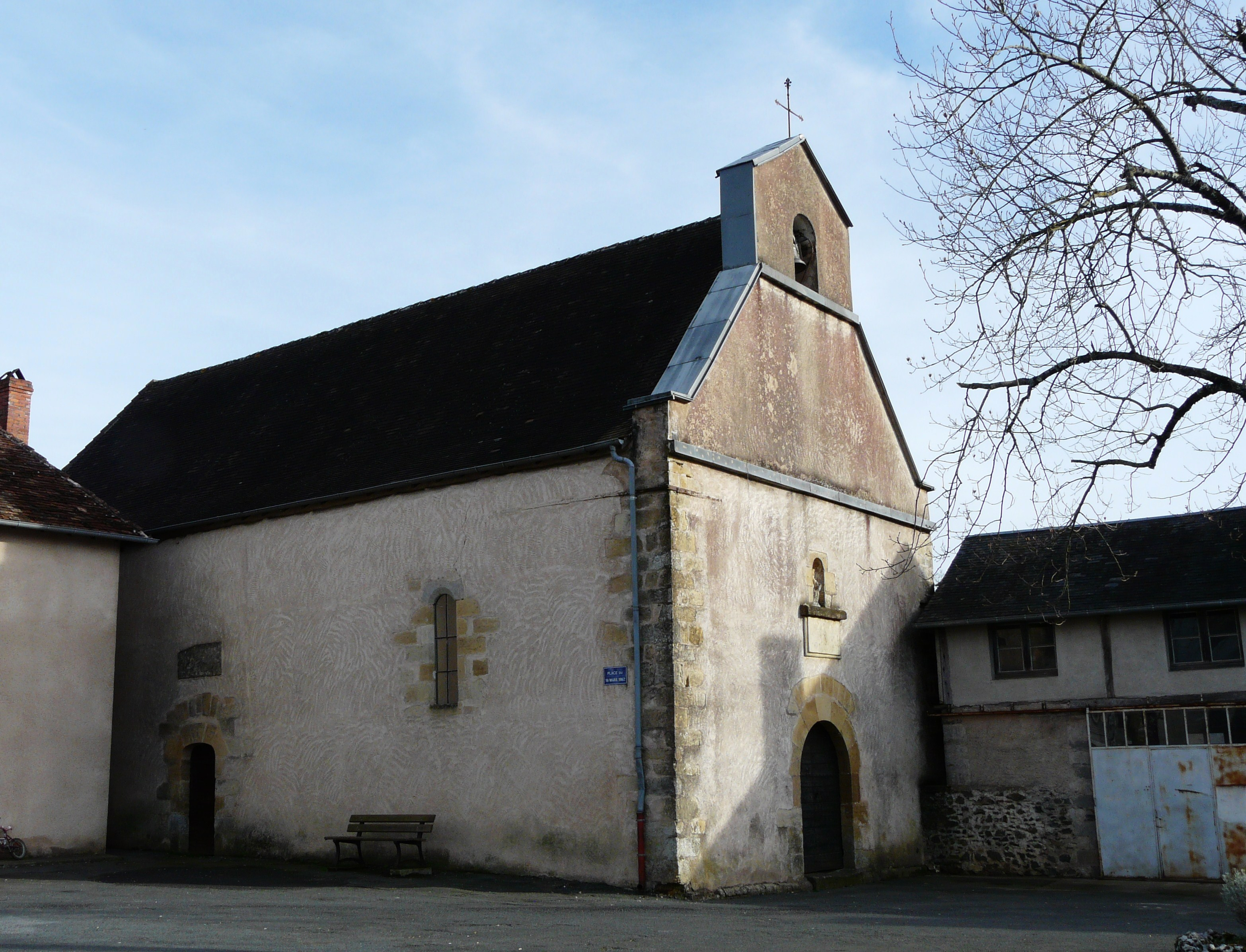
- The church in Savignac-Lédrier
- Location of Savignac-Lédrier
- Location within France Location within Nouvelle-Aquitaine
- Coordinates: 45°21′53″N 1°13′17″E
- Country: France
- Region: Nouvelle-Aquitaine
- Department: Dordogne
- Arrondissement: Nontron
- Canton: Isle-Loue-Auvézère

Government
  - Mayor (2020–2026): Christian André Laguyonie
- Area^{1}: 26.9 km^{2} (10.4 sq mi)
- Elevation: 330 m (1,080 ft)
- Highest elevation: 374 m (1,227 ft)
- Lowest elevation: 214 m (702 ft)
- Population (2023): 729
  - Density: 27.1/km^{2} (70.2/sq mi)
- Time zone: UTC+01:00 (CET)
  - Summer (DST): UTC+02:00 (CEST)
- INSEE/Postal code: 24526 /24270
- ^{1} French Land Register data, which excludes lakes, ponds, glaciers > 1 km^{2} (0.386 sq mi or 247 acres) and river estuaries.

Savignac-Lédrier (French pronunciation: [saviɲak ledʁije]; Occitan: Savinhac Ledrier) is a commune in the Dordogne department of Nouvelle-Aquitaine in southwestern France.

== Geography ==
The commune is situated by the Auvézère river, and is surrounded by other communes including Saint-Cyr-les-Champagnes, Saint-Mesmin, Lanouaille and Payzac. The principal town (La Chapelle) and two villages (La Garanne and La Croix-Merle) are close to the town of Payzac. The town halls of Savignac-Lédrier and Payzac are only 700 m apart.

== History ==
At the creation of the departments in 1790, the commune became a part of the Corrèze département. Three years later in 1793, it was attached to the Dordogne département.

== Population ==
Historical population
| Year | Pop. | ±% p.a. |
|---|---|---|
| 1968 | 809 | — |
| 1975 | 681 | −2.43% |
| 1982 | 738 | +1.15% |
| 1990 | 737 | −0.02% |
| 1999 | 746 | +0.13% |
| 2007 | 748 | +0.03% |
| 2012 | 724 | −0.65% |
| 2017 | 717 | −0.19% |
| 2023 | 729 | +0.28% |
Source: INSEE

== Sights ==
- Château de Bard
- Château de la Forge, 15th-19th century

== See also ==
- Communes of the Dordogne département
