= Dalon =

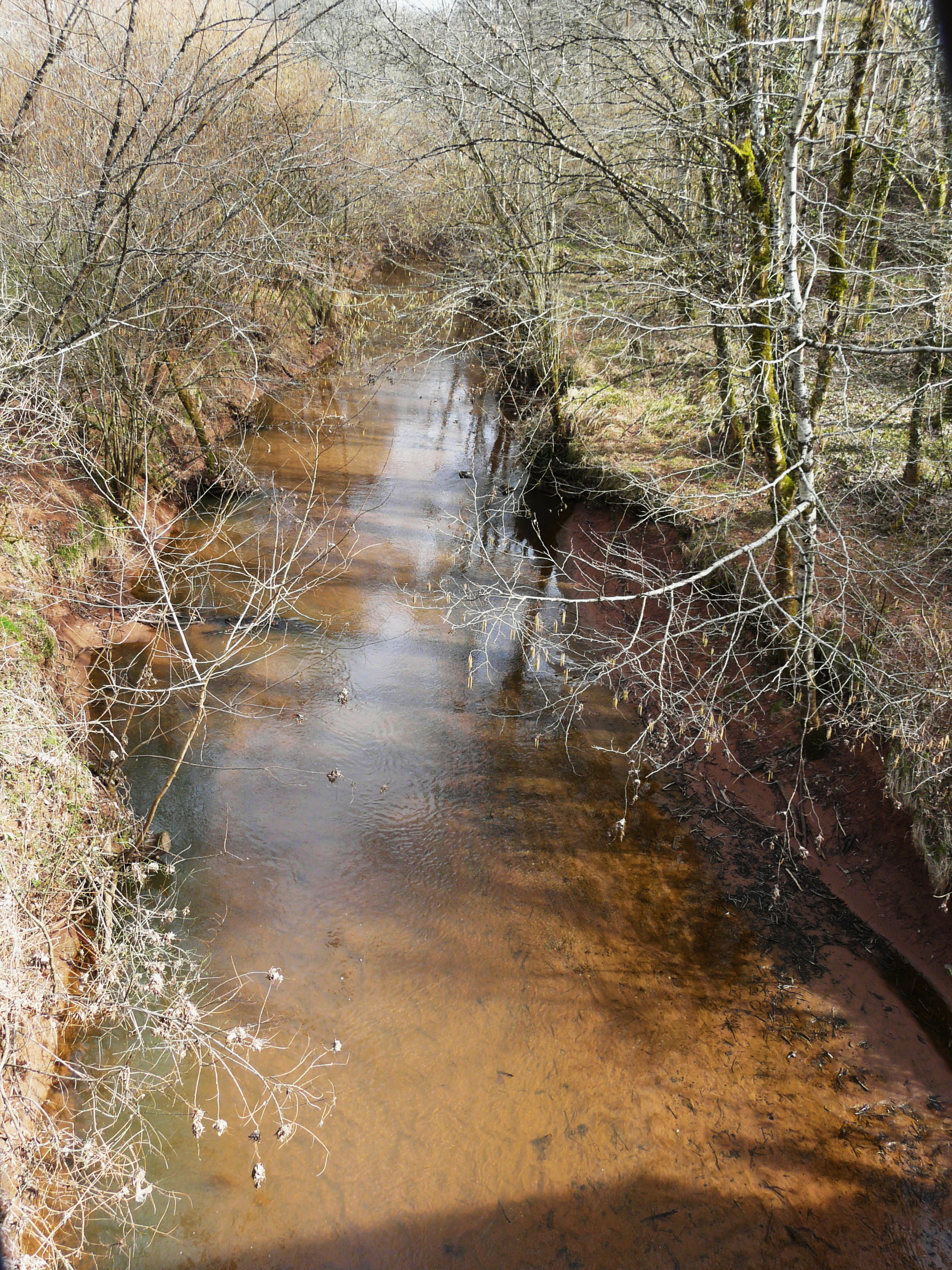

- Location within France Location within Nouvelle-Aquitaine

Location
- Country: France

Physical characteristics
- Source
  - location: Segonzac
- Mouth
  - location: Auvézère
  - coordinates: 45°18′51″N 1°8′25″E
- Length: 17.5 km (10.9 mi)

Basin features
- Progression: Auvézère→ Isle→ Dordogne→ Gironde estuary→ Atlantic Ocean

The Dalon is a stream in the Nouvelle-Aquitaine region of France (Corrèze and Dordogne departments). It is a left tributary of the Auvézère river, which is part of the Dordogne basin. The Dolan is 17.5 km (10.9 mi) long.

The river begins in the commune of Segonzac in Corrèze. The river empties into the Auvézère at the left bank southwest of Génis in Dordogne.
