= Périgueux Bassillac Airport =

Périgueux - Bassillac Airport Aéroport de Bassillac - Périgueux
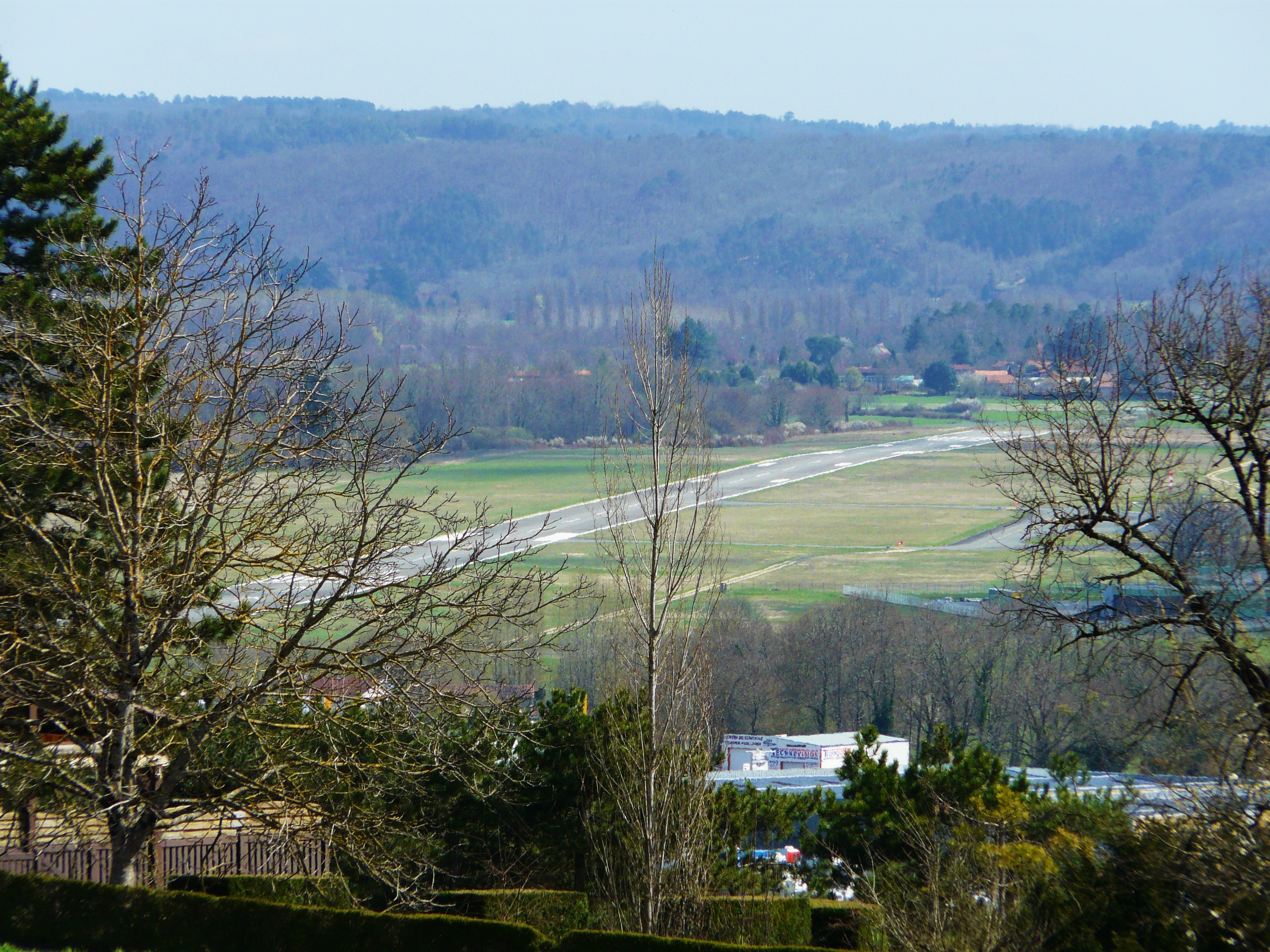
- IATA: PGX; ICAO: LFBX

Summary
- Airport type: Public
- Operator: Mairie de Périgueux
- Serves: Périgueux, France
- Location: Bassillac, France
- Elevation AMSL: 328 ft / 100 m
- Coordinates: 45°11′51″N 000°48′55″E

Map
- Location of airport in Nouvelle-Aquitaine region

Runways
| Direction | Length | | Surface |
| Direction | m | ft | Surface |
|---|---|---|---|
| 11/29 | 1,750 | 5,741 | Paved |
| 11L/29R | 845 | 2,772 | Unpaved |
- Source: French AIP

Périgueux - Bassillac Airport (French: Aéroport de Bassillac - Périgueux) (IATA: PGX, ICAO: LFBX) is an airport in the village of Bassillac in the Dordogne department, Nouvelle-Aquitaine region, France. It is located 8 kilometres (4.3 NM) east-northeast of the town of Périgueux, which manages the airport.

== Facilities ==
The airport resides at an elevation of 328 feet (100 m) above mean sea level. It has one paved runway designated 11/29 which measures 1,750 by 30 metres (5,741 ft × 98 ft). It also has a parallel unpaved runway with a grass surface measuring 845 by 80 metres (2,772 ft × 262 ft).

== Airlines and destinations ==
As of 7 July 2018, there are no regular passenger flights.

== Tenants ==
- ASSAP - Périgueux Aéroclub (piloting lessons)
- GenAIRation Antonov Association (Antonov An-2 exploitation)
- CVVP - parachuting center Périgord
- Périgord Air Job
