= Saint-Éloy-les-Tuileries =

- Commune
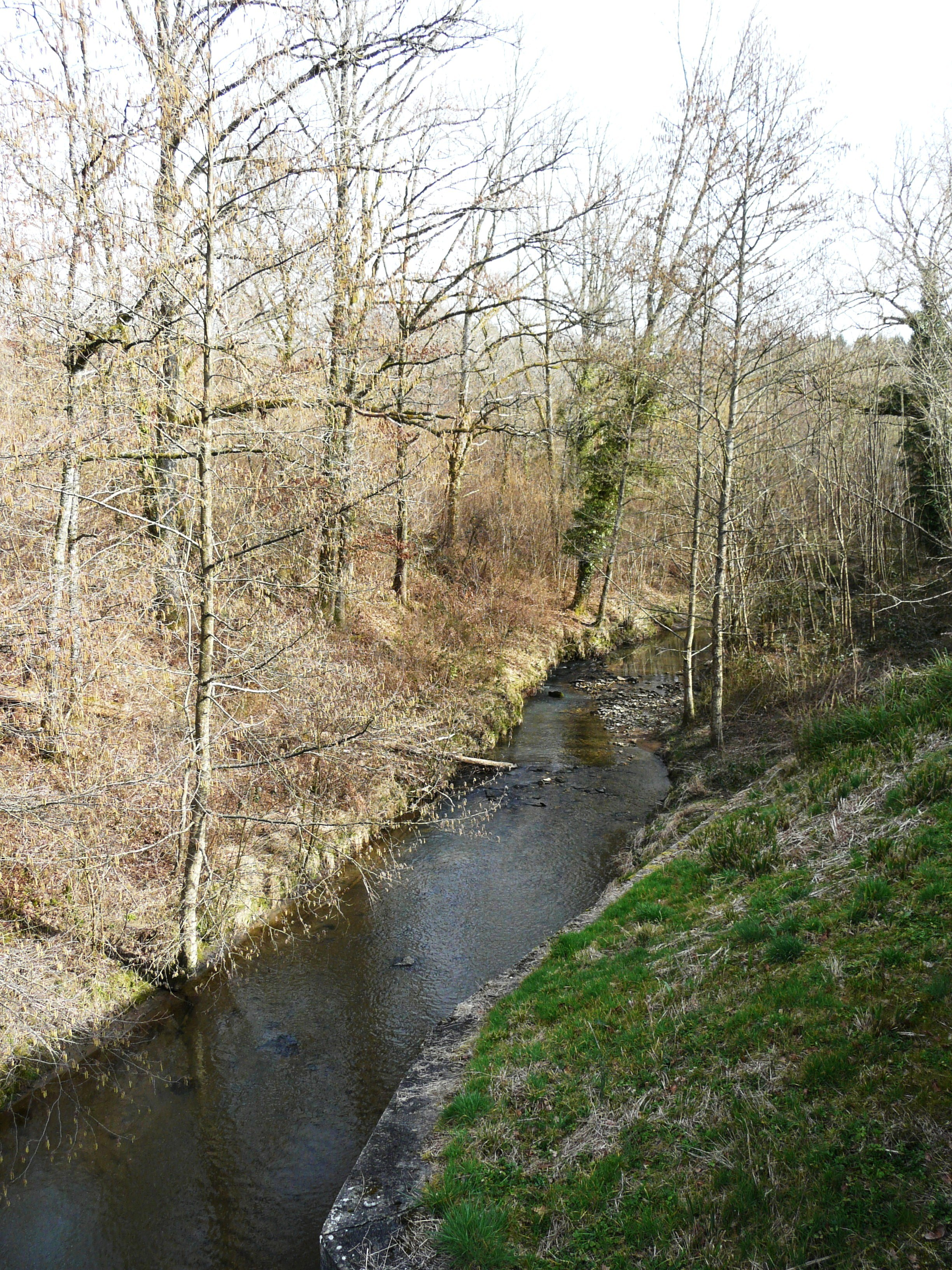
- The Penchennerie, near to Ségur-le-Château

- Coat of arms
- Location of Saint-Éloy-les-Tuileries
- Location within France Location within Nouvelle-Aquitaine
- Coordinates: 45°26′52″N 1°17′36″E
- Country: France
- Region: Nouvelle-Aquitaine
- Department: Corrèze
- Arrondissement: Brive-la-Gaillarde
- Canton: Uzerche
- Intercommunality: Pays de Saint-Yrieix

Government
  - Mayor (2020–2026): Francis Delort
- Area^{1}: 9.13 km^{2} (3.53 sq mi)
- Elevation: 300 m (980 ft)
- Highest elevation: 367 m (1,204 ft)
- Lowest elevation: 263 m (863 ft)
- Population (2023): 114
  - Density: 12.5/km^{2} (32.3/sq mi)
- Time zone: UTC+01:00 (CET)
  - Summer (DST): UTC+02:00 (CEST)
- INSEE/Postal code: 19198 /19210
- ^{1} French Land Register data, which excludes lakes, ponds, glaciers > 1 km^{2} (0.386 sq mi or 247 acres) and river estuaries.

Saint-Éloy-les-Tuileries (French pronunciation: [sɛ̃.t‿elwa le tɥilʁi]; Limousin: Sent Aliég) is a commune in the Corrèze department in central France.

== Population ==
Historical population
Year	Pop.	±% p.a.
1968	218	—
1975	196	−1.51%
1982	159	−2.94%
1990	133	−2.21%
1999	124	−0.78%
2007	119	−0.51%
2012	114	−0.85%
2017	102	−2.20%
2023	114	+1.87%
Source: INSEE

== See also ==
- Communes of the Corrèze department
