= Blis-et-Born =

- Part of Bassillac et Auberoche
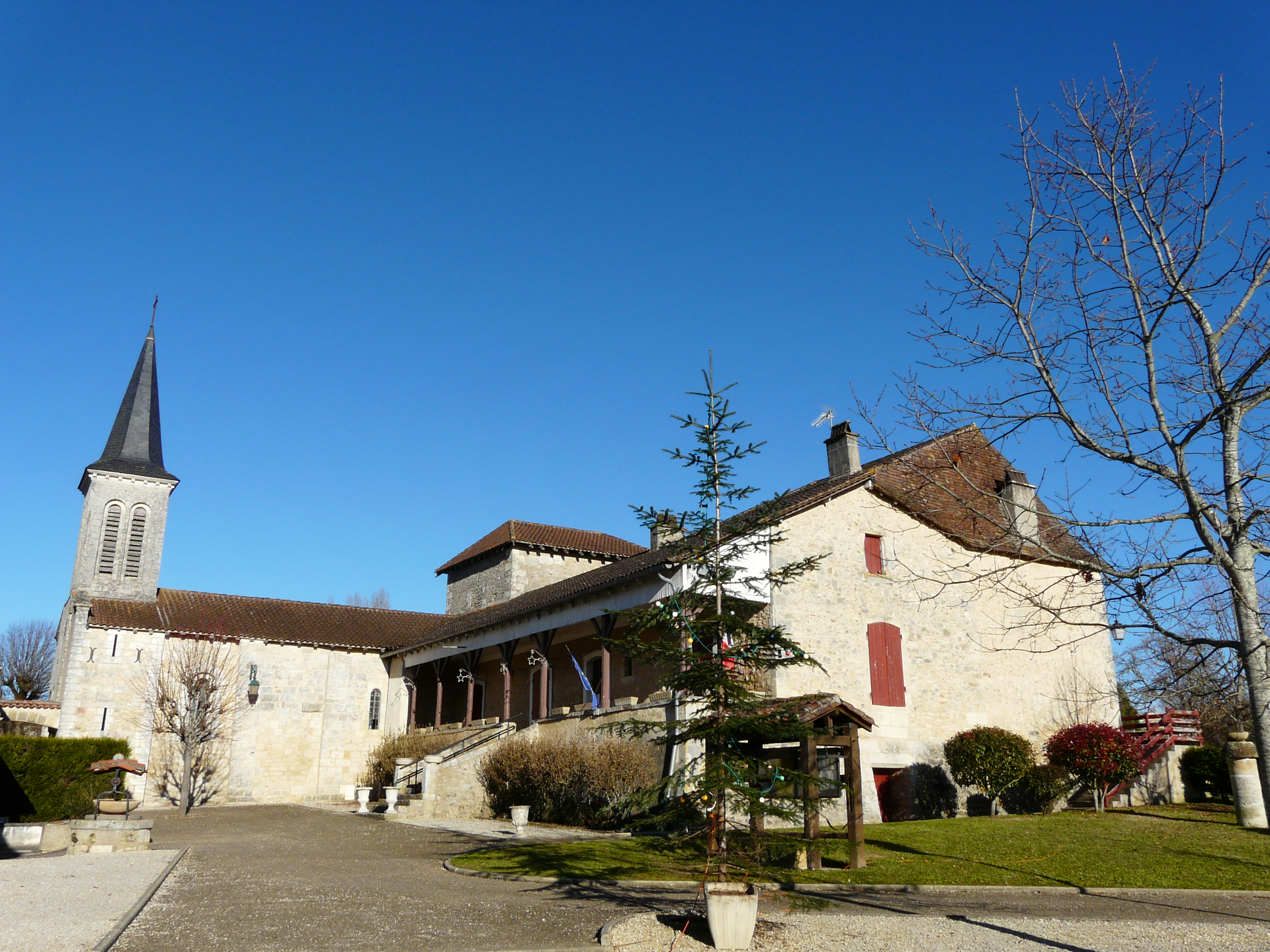
- Town hall

- Coat of arms
- Location of Blis-et-Born
- Location within France Location within Nouvelle-Aquitaine
- Coordinates: 45°10′55″N 0°54′29″E
- Country: France
- Region: Nouvelle-Aquitaine
- Department: Dordogne
- Arrondissement: Périgueux
- Canton: Haut-Périgord noir
- Commune: Bassillac et Auberoche
- Area^{1}: 20.20 km^{2} (7.80 sq mi)
- Elevation: 230 m (750 ft)
- Highest elevation: 257 m (843 ft)
- Lowest elevation: 93 m (305 ft)
- Population (2023): 459
  - Density: 22.7/km^{2} (58.9/sq mi)
- Time zone: UTC+01:00 (CET)
  - Summer (DST): UTC+02:00 (CEST)
- Postal code: 24330
- ^{1} French Land Register data, which excludes lakes, ponds, glaciers > 1 km^{2} (0.386 sq mi or 247 acres) and river estuaries.

Blis-et-Born (French pronunciation: [blis e bɔʁn]; Occitan: En Bòrn) is a former commune in the Dordogne department in southwestern France. On 1 January 2017, it was merged into the new commune Bassillac et Auberoche.

== See also ==
- Communes of the Dordogne département
