= Bassillac et Auberoche =

- Commune
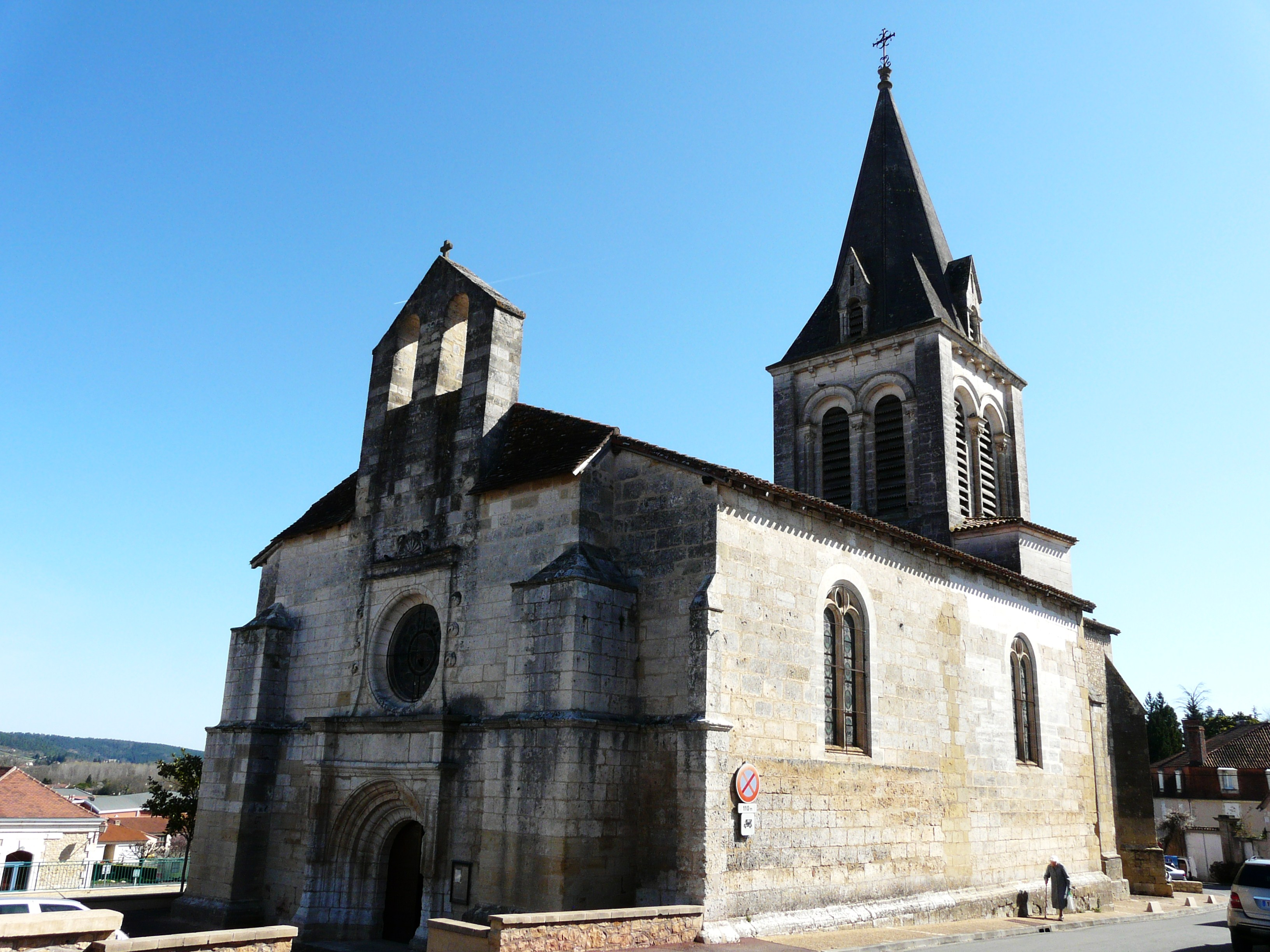
- The church in Bassillac
- Location of Bassillac et Auberoche
- Location within France Location within Nouvelle-Aquitaine
- Coordinates: 45°11′28″N 0°48′50″E
- Country: France
- Region: Nouvelle-Aquitaine
- Department: Dordogne
- Arrondissement: Périgueux
- Canton: Isle-Manoire, Haut-Périgord Noir
- Intercommunality: Le Grand Périgueux
- Area^{1}: 103.26 km^{2} (39.87 sq mi)
- Population (2023): 4,361
  - Density: 42.23/km^{2} (109.4/sq mi)
- Time zone: UTC+01:00 (CET)
  - Summer (DST): UTC+02:00 (CEST)
- INSEE/Postal code: 24026 /24330
- ^{1} French Land Register data, which excludes lakes, ponds, glaciers > 1 km^{2} (0.386 sq mi or 247 acres) and river estuaries.

Bassillac et Auberoche (French pronunciation: [basijak e obʁɔʃ]; Occitan: Bassilhac e Aubaròcha) is a commune in the department of Dordogne, southwestern France. The municipality was established on 1 January 2017 by merger of the former communes of Bassillac (the seat), Blis-et-Born, Eyliac, Le Change, Milhac-d'Auberoche and Saint-Antoine-d'Auberoche.

== Population ==
Population data refer to the commune in its geography as of January 2025.

Historical population
| Year | Pop. | ±% p.a. |
|---|---|---|
| 1968 | 2,177 | — |
| 1975 | 2,258 | +0.52% |
| 1982 | 3,005 | +4.17% |
| 1990 | 3,548 | +2.10% |
| 1999 | 3,854 | +0.92% |
| 2007 | 4,065 | +0.67% |
| 2012 | 4,338 | +1.31% |
| 2017 | 4,498 | +0.73% |
| 2023 | 4,361 | −0.51% |
Source: INSEE

== See also ==
- Communes of the Dordogne department
