= Penchennerie =

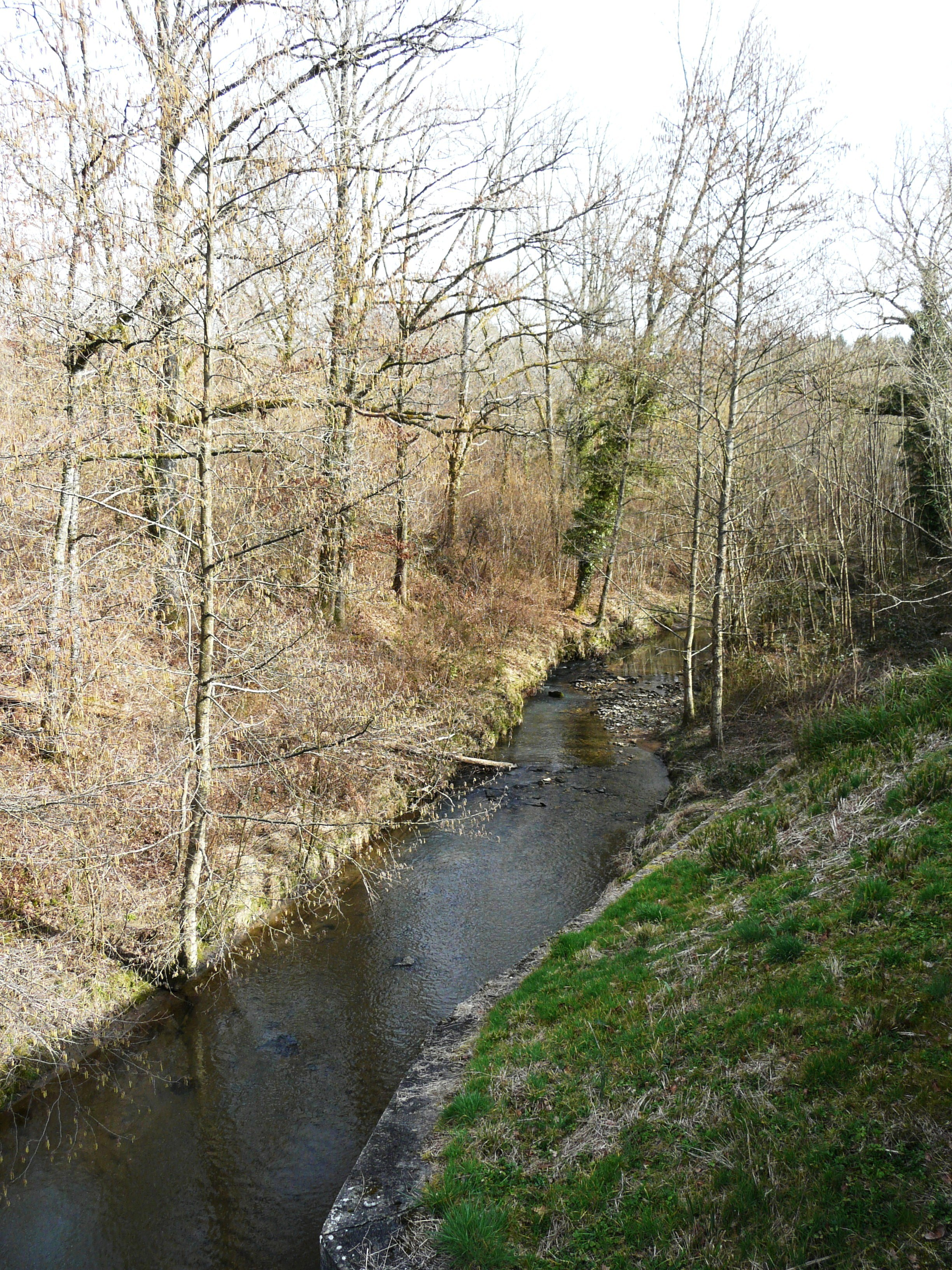

- Location within France Location within Nouvelle-Aquitaine

Location
- Country: France

Physical characteristics
- Source
  - location: Haute-Vienne
- Mouth
  - location: Auvézère
  - coordinates: 45°25′33″N 1°16′27″E
- Length: 10 km (6.2 mi)

Basin features
- Progression: Auvézère→ Isle→ Dordogne→ Gironde estuary→ Atlantic Ocean

The Penchennerie is a stream in southwestern France. It is a tributary of the river Auvézère, which is part of the Dordogne basin. It is 10.4 km (6.5 mi) long.

The stream begins in the commune of Coussac-Bonneval in the Haute-Vienne department, passes through the Corrèze department near Saint-Éloy-les-Tuileries, and flows into the Auvézère in the Dordogne department, northeast of Payzac.
