= Boucheuse =

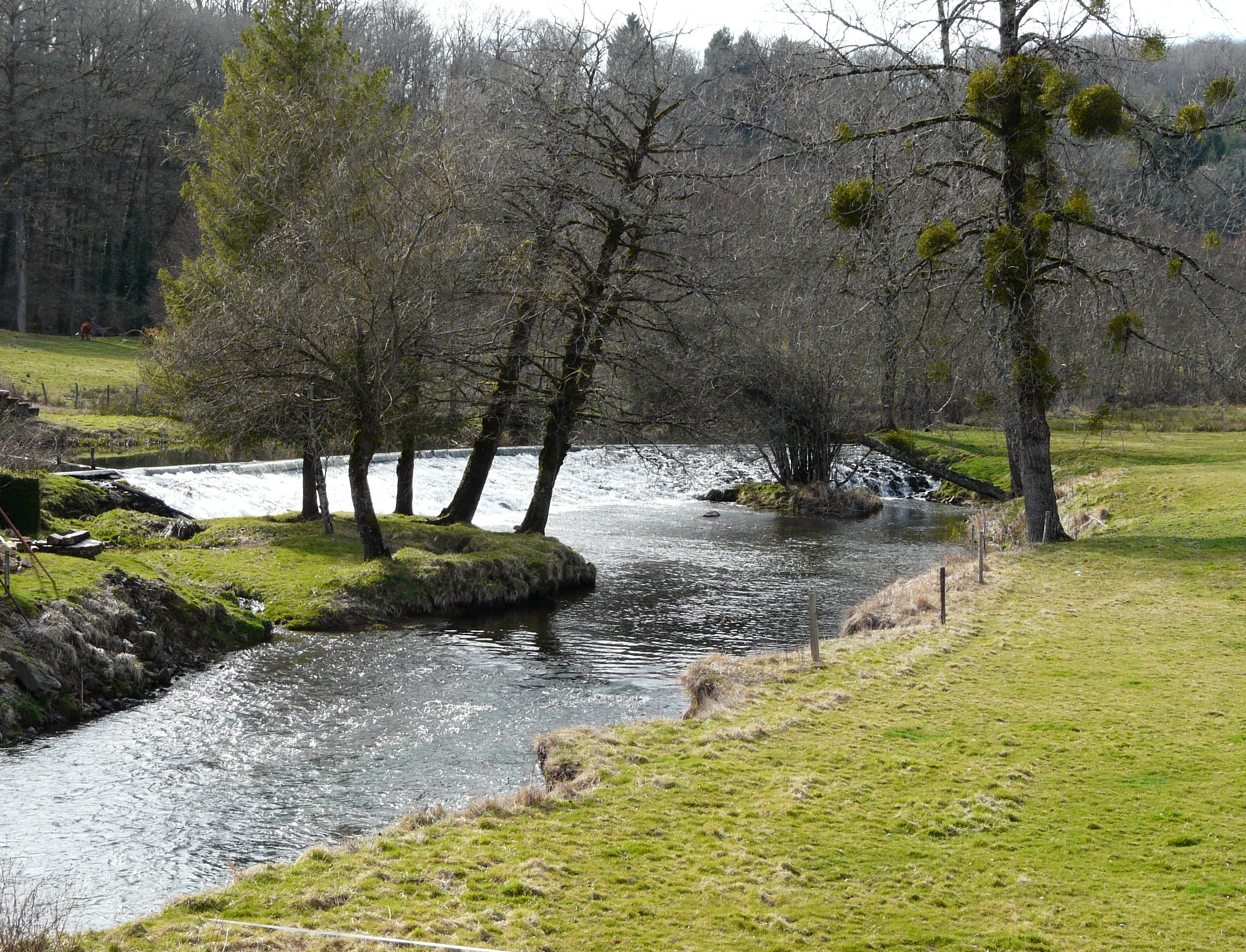

- Location within France Location within Nouvelle-Aquitaine

Location
- Country: France

Physical characteristics
- Mouth
  - location: Auvézère
  - coordinates: 45°25′27″N 1°16′10″E
- Length: 38 km (24 mi)

Basin features
- Progression: Auvézère→ Isle→ Dordogne→ Gironde estuary→ Atlantic Ocean

The Boucheuse (French pronunciation: [buʃøz]) is a river in south-western France. It is a right tributary of the river Auvézère, which is part of the Dordogne basin. The Boucheuse is 38.1 km (23.7 mi) long.

The river begins in the commune of Magnac-Bourg in Haute-Vienne. It traverses the Corrèze department. It flows into the Auvézère near Payzac, in the Dordogne department. The main tributary is the Valentine at its right bank.
