= Milhac-d'Auberoche =

- Part of Bassillac et Auberoche
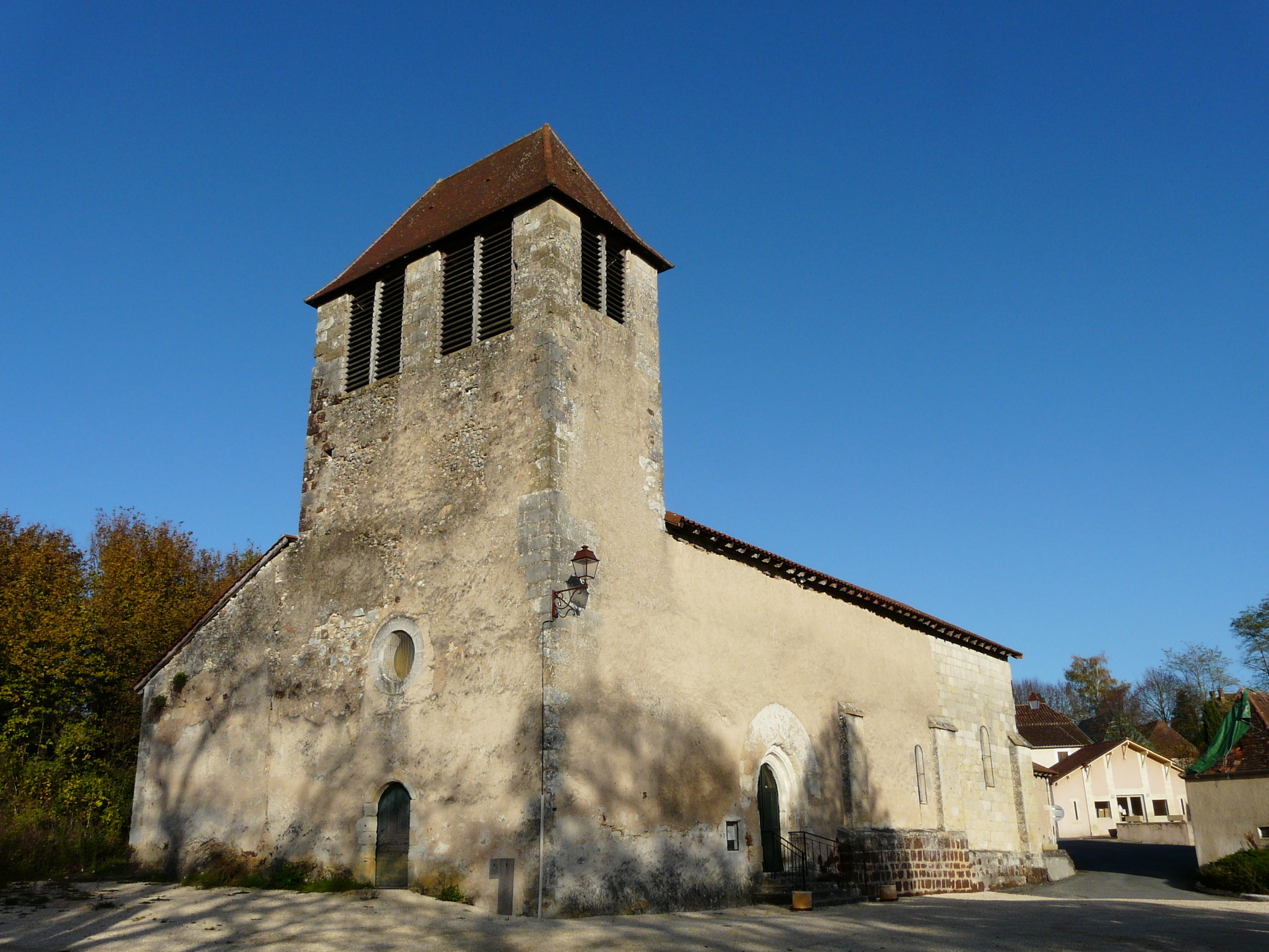

- Coat of arms
- Location of Milhac-d'Auberoche
- Location within France Location within Nouvelle-Aquitaine
- Coordinates: 45°06′41″N 0°54′57″E
- Country: France
- Region: Nouvelle-Aquitaine
- Department: Dordogne
- Arrondissement: Périgueux
- Canton: Haut-Périgord noir
- Commune: Bassillac et Auberoche
- Area^{1}: 17.50 km^{2} (6.76 sq mi)
- Elevation: 165 m (541 ft)
- Highest elevation: 253 m (830 ft)
- Lowest elevation: 155 m (509 ft)
- Population (2023): 548
  - Density: 31.3/km^{2} (81.1/sq mi)
- Time zone: UTC+01:00 (CET)
  - Summer (DST): UTC+02:00 (CEST)
- Postal code: 24330
- ^{1} French Land Register data, which excludes lakes, ponds, glaciers > 1 km^{2} (0.386 sq mi or 247 acres) and river estuaries.

Milhac-d'Auberoche (French pronunciation: [mijak dobʁɔʃ]; Occitan: Milhac d'Aubaròcha) is a former commune in the Dordogne department in Nouvelle-Aquitaine in southwestern France. On 1 January 2017, it was merged into the new commune Bassillac et Auberoche.

== See also ==
- Communes of the Dordogne department
