= Blâme =

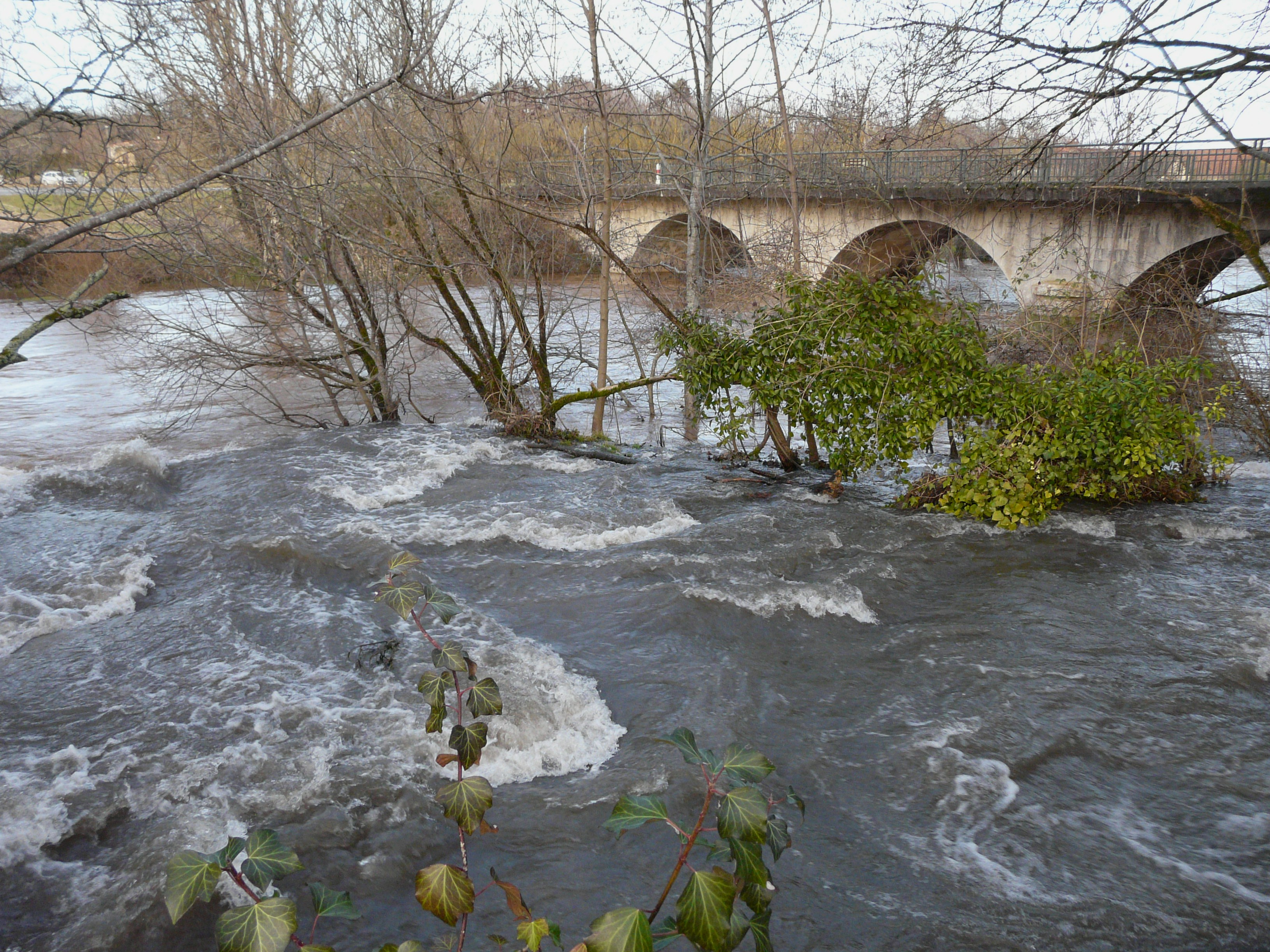
- La Forge d'Ans

- Location within France Location within Nouvelle-Aquitaine

Location
- Country: France

Physical characteristics
- Source
  - location: Dordogne
- Mouth
  - location: Auvézère
  - coordinates: 45°13′40″N 0°59′10″E
- Length: 6.1 km (3.8 mi)

Basin features
- Progression: Auvézère→ Isle→ Dordogne→ Gironde estuary→ Atlantic Ocean

The Blâme (French pronunciation: [blam]), is a short river in the region of Nouvelle-Aquitaine in France. This 6.1 km (3.8 mi) long river is a left tributary of the Auvézère. It flows entirely within the department of Dordogne.

== Geography ==
The Blâme is a left tributary of the Auvézère river. It empties into the Auvézère slightly east of the commune of La Boissière-d'Ans with a small waterfall near La Forge d'Ans. Its source is the spring Puits de Bontemps, 1.5 km south of Brouchaud.

The Blâme has one tributary, the small river Soue (also called Lassoue). The two rivers join at the village of Brouchaud.

== See also ==
- List of rivers of France
