= Brouchaud =

- Commune
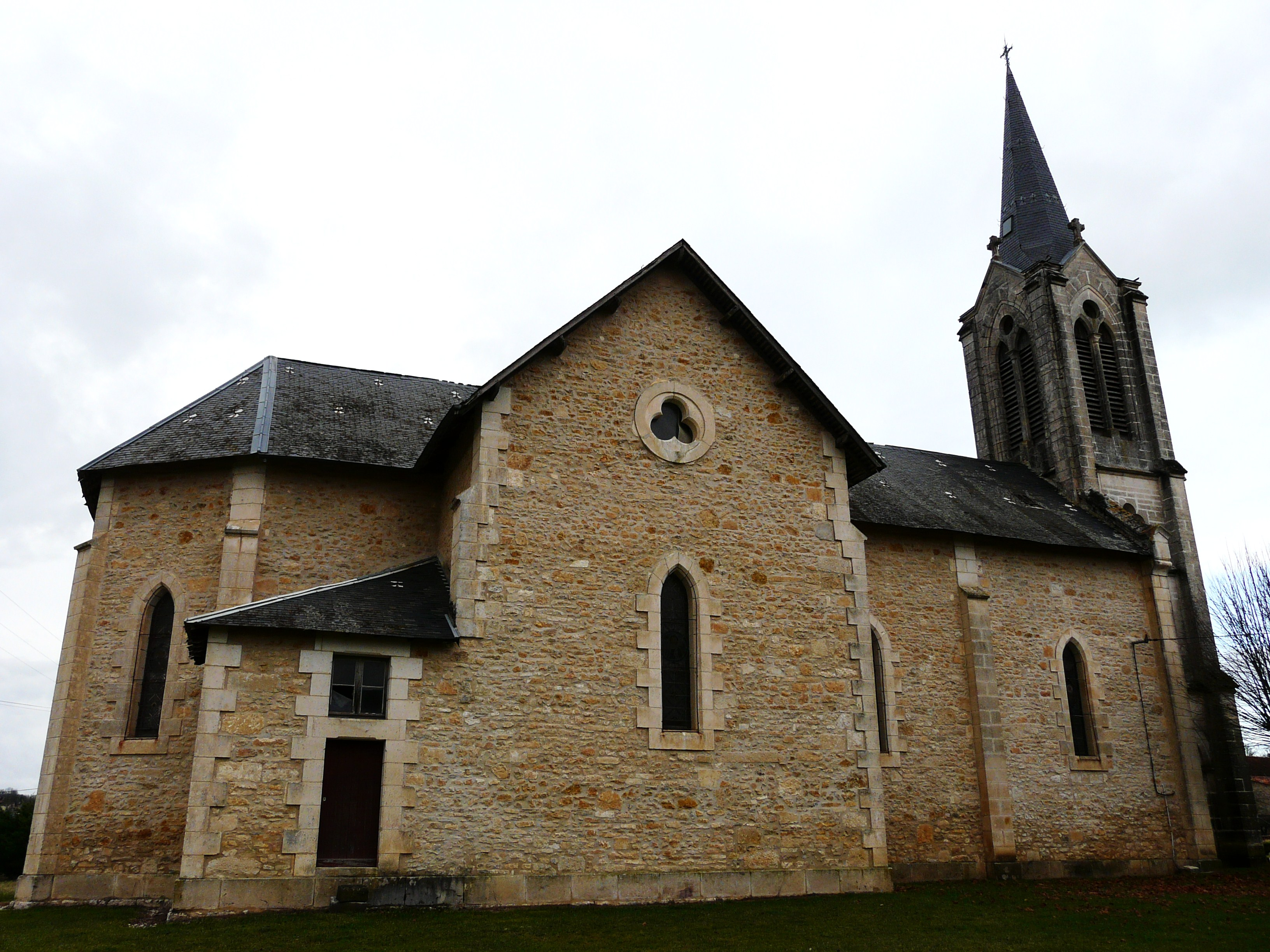
- The church in Brouchaud
- Location of Brouchaud
- Location within France Location within Nouvelle-Aquitaine
- Coordinates: 45°12′27″N 0°59′51″E
- Country: France
- Region: Nouvelle-Aquitaine
- Department: Dordogne
- Arrondissement: Nontron
- Canton: Isle-Loue-Auvézère

Government
  - Mayor (2020–2026): Christel Pourcel
- Area^{1}: 11.94 km^{2} (4.61 sq mi)
- Highest elevation: 232 m (761 ft)
- Lowest elevation: 127 m (417 ft)
- Population (2023): 224
  - Density: 18.8/km^{2} (48.6/sq mi)
- Time zone: UTC+01:00 (CET)
  - Summer (DST): UTC+02:00 (CEST)
- INSEE/Postal code: 24066 /24210
- ^{1} French Land Register data, which excludes lakes, ponds, glaciers > 1 km^{2} (0.386 sq mi or 247 acres) and river estuaries.

Brouchaud (French pronunciation: [bʁuʃo]; Occitan: Brochau) is a commune in the Dordogne department in southwestern France.

== Geography ==
The small rivers Soue and Blâme join near Brouchaud.

== Population ==
Historical population
| Year | Pop. | ±% p.a. |
|---|---|---|
| 1968 | 200 | — |
| 1975 | 194 | −0.43% |
| 1982 | 161 | −2.63% |
| 1990 | 212 | +3.50% |
| 1999 | 178 | −1.92% |
| 2007 | 210 | +2.09% |
| 2012 | 217 | +0.66% |
| 2017 | 218 | +0.09% |
| 2023 | 224 | +0.45% |
Source: INSEE

== See also ==
- Communes of the Dordogne department
