= Saint-Antoine-d'Auberoche =

- Part of Bassillac et Auberoche
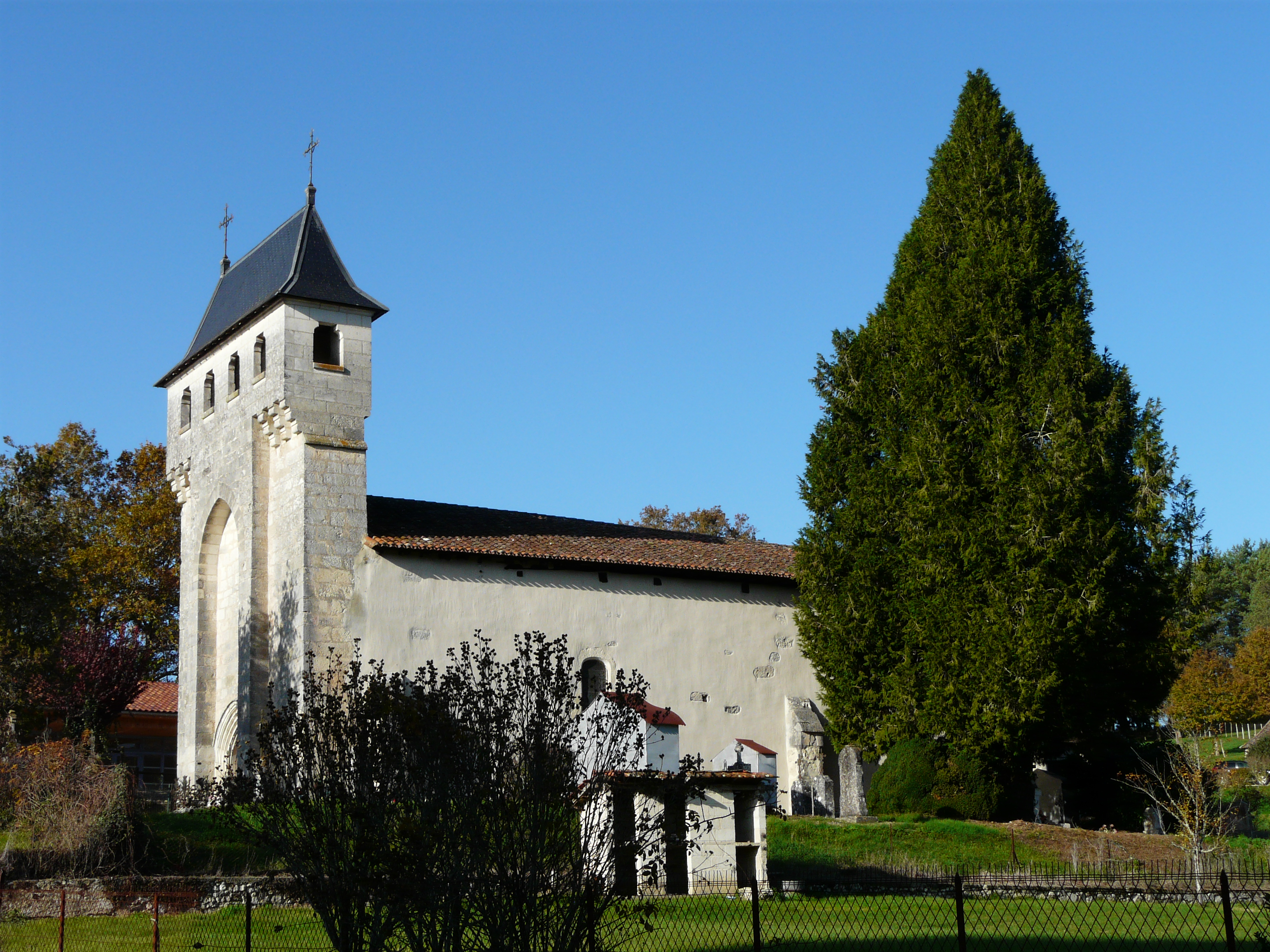
- Location of Saint-Antoine-d'Auberoche
- Location within France Location within Nouvelle-Aquitaine
- Coordinates: 45°08′34″N 0°56′39″E
- Country: France
- Region: Nouvelle-Aquitaine
- Department: Dordogne
- Arrondissement: Périgueux
- Canton: Haut-Périgord noir
- Commune: Bassillac et Auberoche
- Area^{1}: 7.87 km^{2} (3.04 sq mi)
- Elevation: 152 m (499 ft)
- Highest elevation: 255 m (837 ft)
- Lowest elevation: 162 m (531 ft)
- Population (2023): 137
  - Density: 17.4/km^{2} (45.1/sq mi)
- Time zone: UTC+01:00 (CET)
  - Summer (DST): UTC+02:00 (CEST)
- Postal code: 24330
- ^{1} French Land Register data, which excludes lakes, ponds, glaciers > 1 km^{2} (0.386 sq mi or 247 acres) and river estuaries.

Saint-Antoine-d'Auberoche (French pronunciation: [sɛ̃t‿ɑ̃twan dobʁɔʃ]; Occitan: Sent Antòni d'Aubaròcha) is a former commune in the Dordogne department in Nouvelle-Aquitaine in southwestern France. On 1 January 2017, it was merged into the new commune Bassillac et Auberoche.

== See also ==
- Communes of the Dordogne department
