= Lourde (river) =

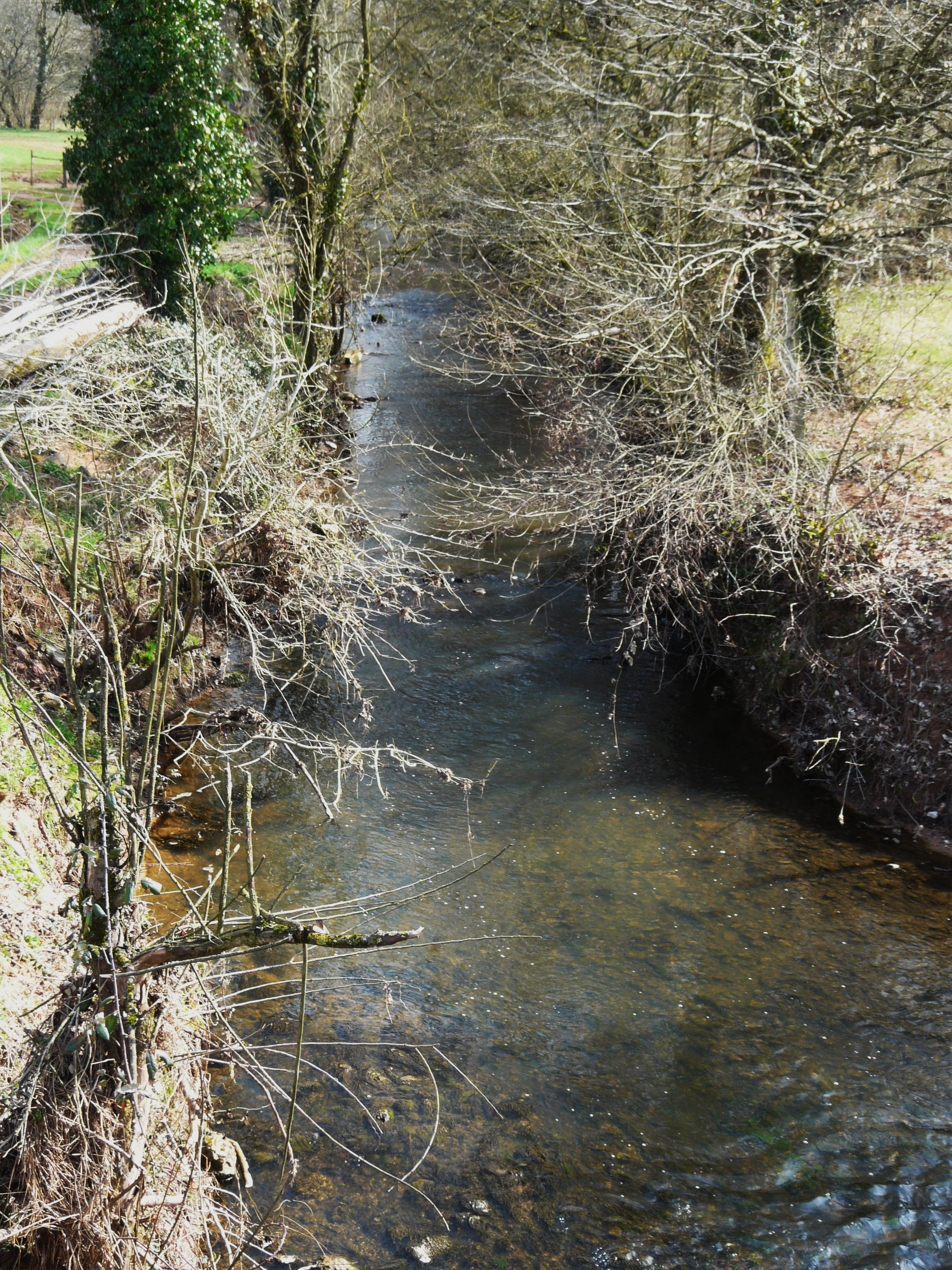

- Location within France Location within Nouvelle-Aquitaine

Location
- Country: France

Physical characteristics
- Source
  - location: Dordogne
- Mouth
  - location: Auvézère
  - coordinates: 45°17′4″N 1°6′10″E
- Length: 13 km (8.1 mi)

Basin features
- Progression: Auvézère→ Isle→ Dordogne→ Gironde estuary→ Atlantic Ocean

The Lourde is a stream in the Dordogne department of southwestern France. It is a tributary of the Auvézère river, which is part of the Dordogne basin. The 12.8 km (8.0 mi) long Lourde begins on the border of the communes of Teillots and Badefols-d'Ans. It passes Hautefort and empties into the Auvézère in its left bank in Cherveix-Cubas, northwest of the hamlet of Saint-Martial-Laborie.
