= Belles-Dames =

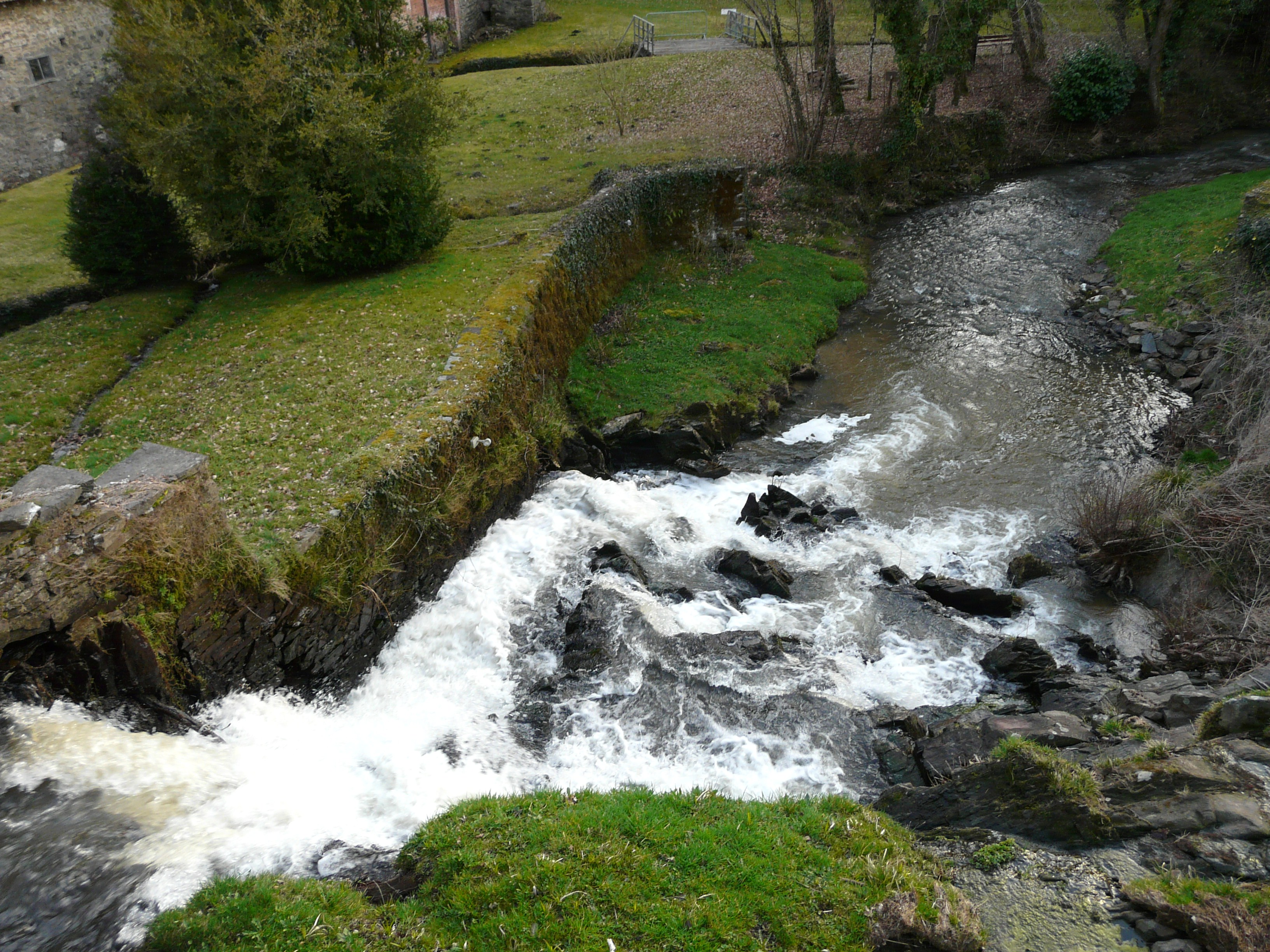

- Location within France Location within Nouvelle-Aquitaine

Location
- Country: France

Physical characteristics
- Source
  - location: Corrèze department
- Mouth
  - location: Auvézère
  - coordinates: 45°23′13″N 1°14′26″E
- Length: 13 km (8.1 mi)

Basin features
- Progression: Auvézère→ Isle→ Dordogne→ Gironde estuary→ Atlantic Ocean

The Belles-Dames (French pronunciation: [bɛl dam]; also known as the Orne) is a small river in the Corrèze and Dordogne departments of southwestern France. It is a tributary of the river Auvézère, which is part of the Dordogne basin. It is 12.8 km (8.0 mi) long. Its source is near Beyssenac, and it flows into the Auvézère near Payzac.

== See also ==
- List of rivers of France
