= Segonzac, Corrèze =

Segonzac
- Commune
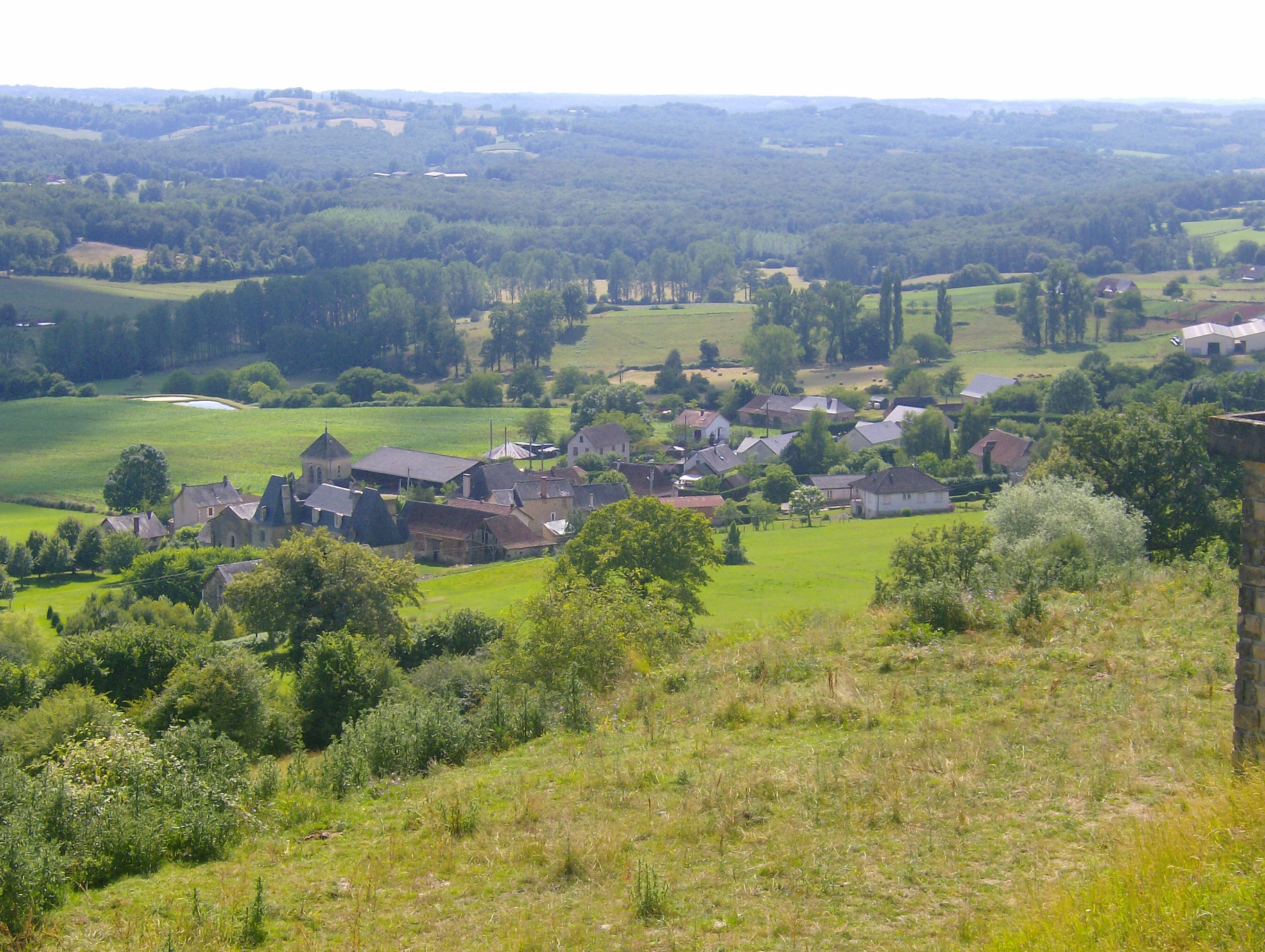
- The village of Segonzac seen from the Puy de Segonzac

- Coat of arms
- Location of Segonzac
- Location within France Location within Nouvelle-Aquitaine
- Coordinates: 45°16′32″N 1°16′39″E
- Country: France
- Region: Nouvelle-Aquitaine
- Department: Corrèze
- Arrondissement: Brive-la-Gaillarde
- Canton: L'Yssandonnais
- Intercommunality: CA Bassin de Brive

Government
  - Mayor (2020–2026): Jean-Louis Michel
- Area^{1}: 20.21 km^{2} (7.80 sq mi)
- Elevation: 277 m (909 ft)
- Highest elevation: 348 m (1,142 ft)
- Lowest elevation: 150 m (490 ft)
- Population (2023): 192
  - Density: 9.50/km^{2} (24.6/sq mi)
- Time zone: UTC+01:00 (CET)
  - Summer (DST): UTC+02:00 (CEST)
- INSEE/Postal code: 19253 /19310
- ^{1} French Land Register data, which excludes lakes, ponds, glaciers > 1 km^{2} (0.386 sq mi or 247 acres) and river estuaries.

Segonzac (French pronunciation: [səɡɔ̃zak]) is a commune in the Corrèze department in central France.

== Population ==
Historical population
Year	Pop.	±% p.a.
1968	375	—
1975	329	−1.85%
1982	327	−0.09%
1990	253	−3.16%
1999	239	−0.63%
2007	231	−0.42%
2012	227	−0.35%
2017	222	−0.44%
2023	192	−2.39%
Source: INSEE

== See also ==
- Communes of the Corrèze department
