= Le Change =

- Part of Bassillac et Auberoche
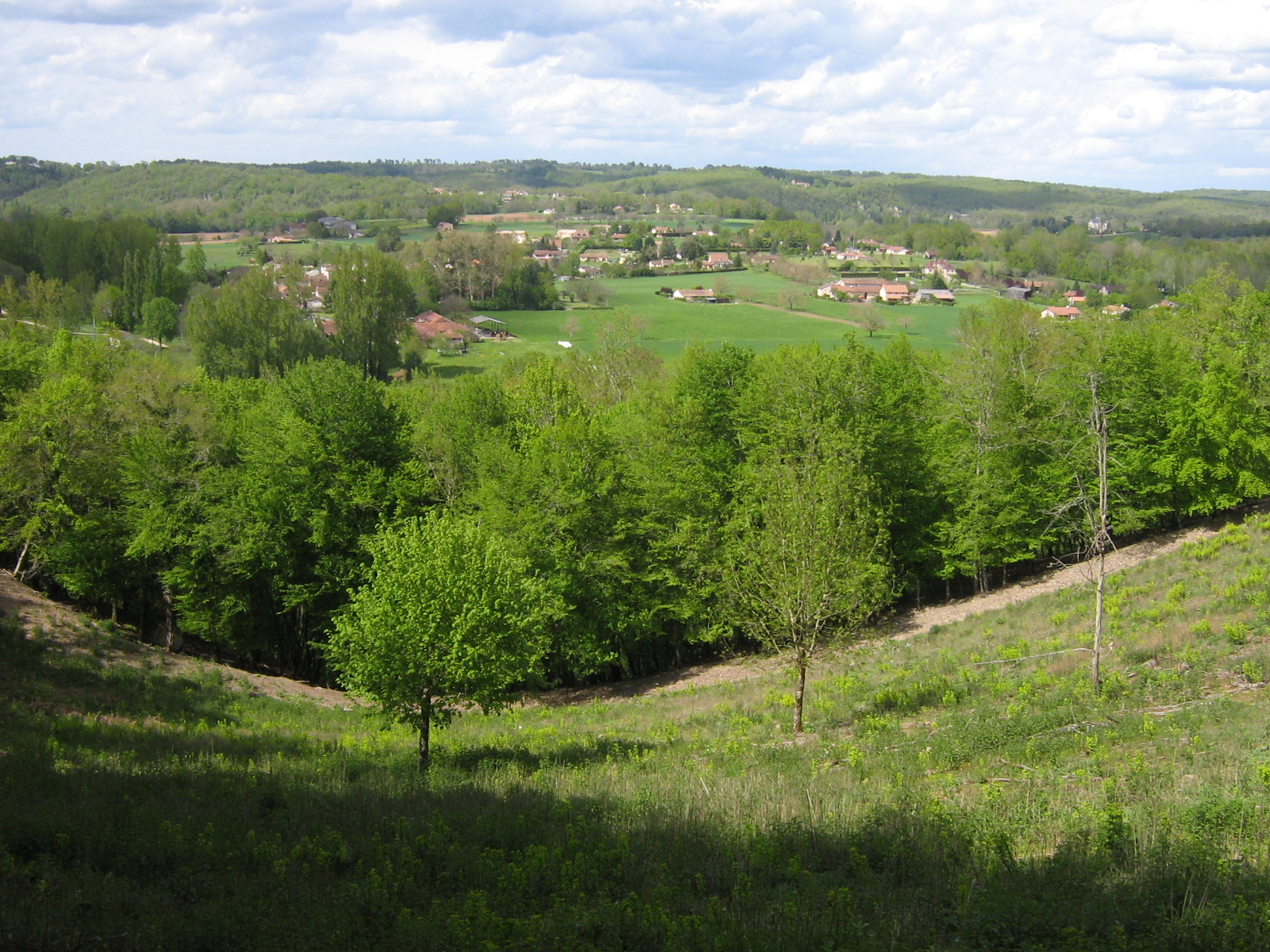
- Location of Le Change
- Location within France Location within Nouvelle-Aquitaine
- Coordinates: 45°11′41″N 0°53′41″E
- Country: France
- Region: Nouvelle-Aquitaine
- Department: Dordogne
- Arrondissement: Périgueux
- Canton: Haut-Périgord noir
- Commune: Bassillac et Auberoche
- Area^{1}: 16.22 km^{2} (6.26 sq mi)
- Elevation: 106 m (348 ft)
- Highest elevation: 228 m (748 ft)
- Lowest elevation: 92 m (302 ft)
- Population (2023): 627
  - Density: 38.7/km^{2} (100/sq mi)
- Time zone: UTC+01:00 (CET)
  - Summer (DST): UTC+02:00 (CEST)
- Postal code: 24640
- ^{1} French Land Register data, which excludes lakes, ponds, glaciers > 1 km^{2} (0.386 sq mi or 247 acres) and river estuaries.

Le Change (French pronunciation: [lə ʃɑ̃ʒ]; Limousin: Lo Chamnhe) is a former commune in the Dordogne department in Nouvelle-Aquitaine in southwestern France. On 1 January 2017, it was merged into the new commune Bassillac et Auberoche.

== Gallery ==
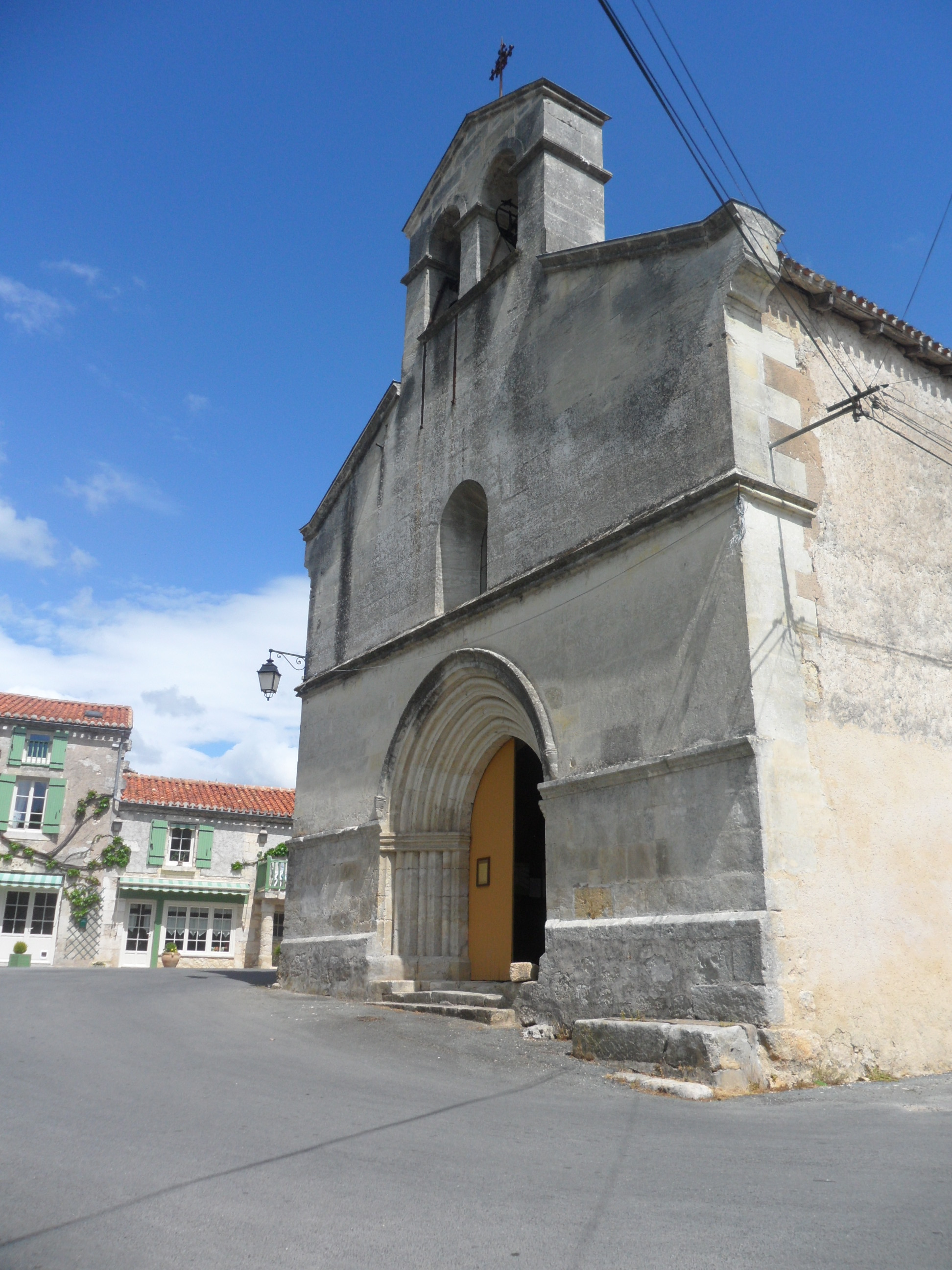

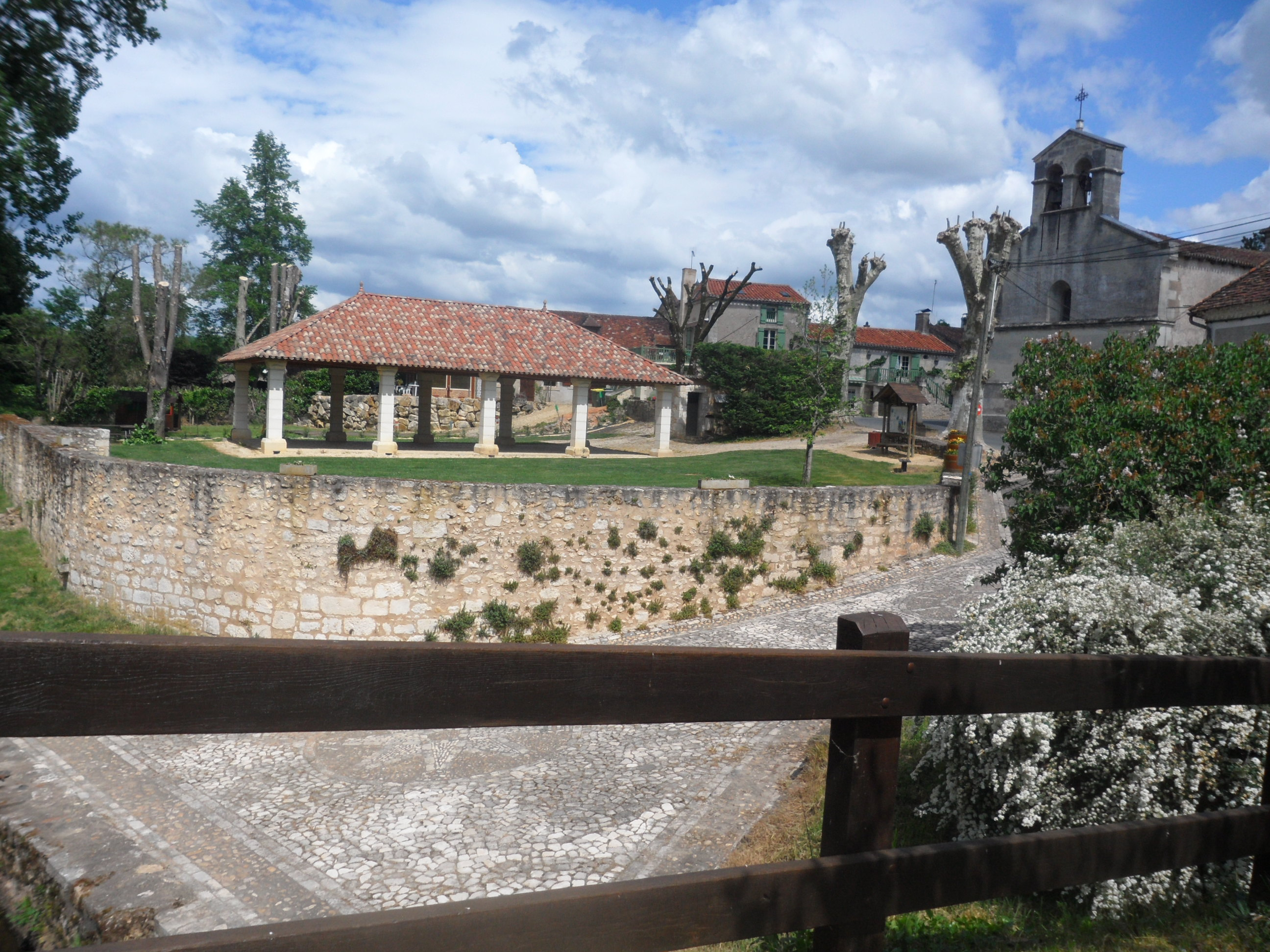

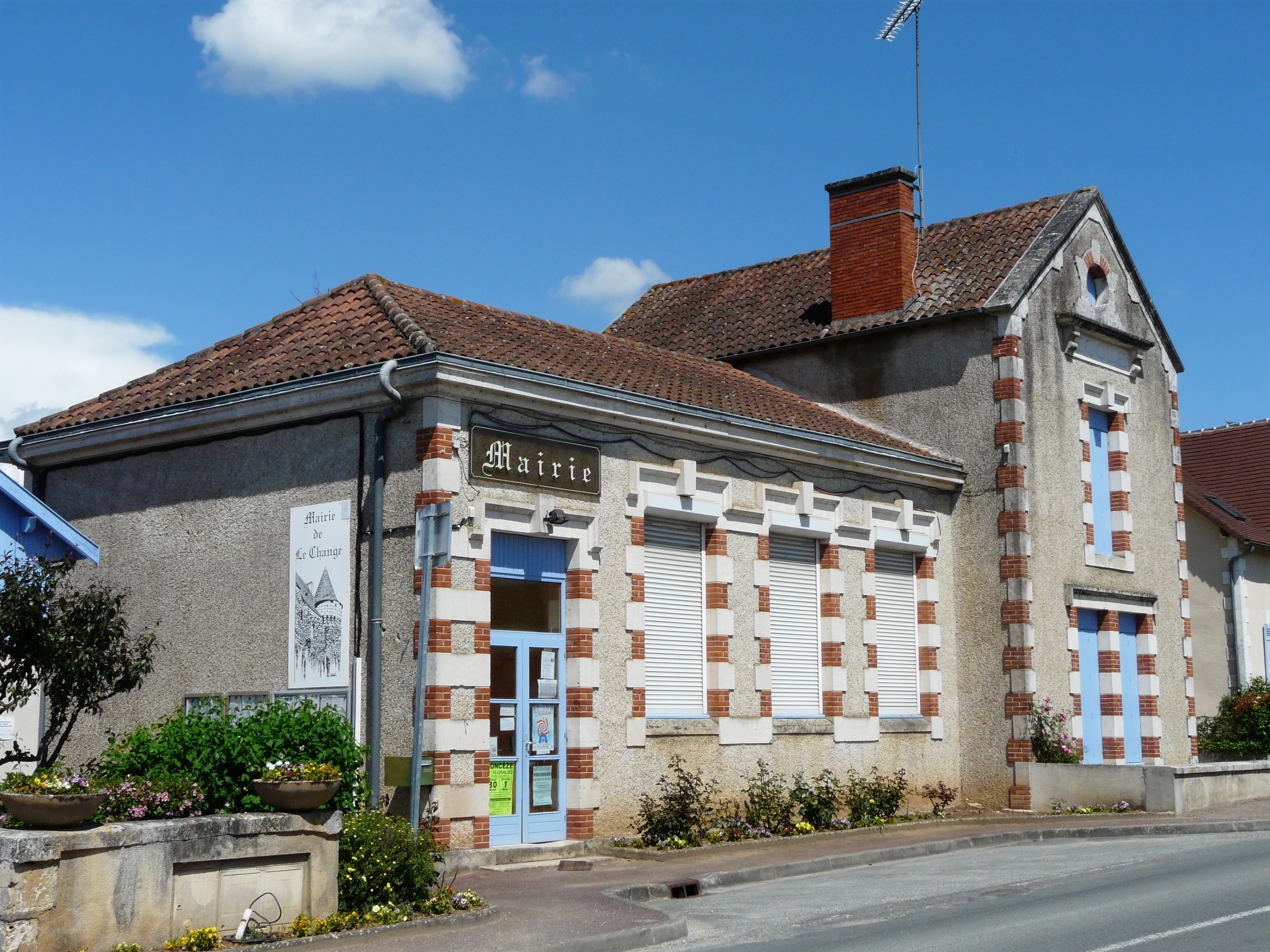

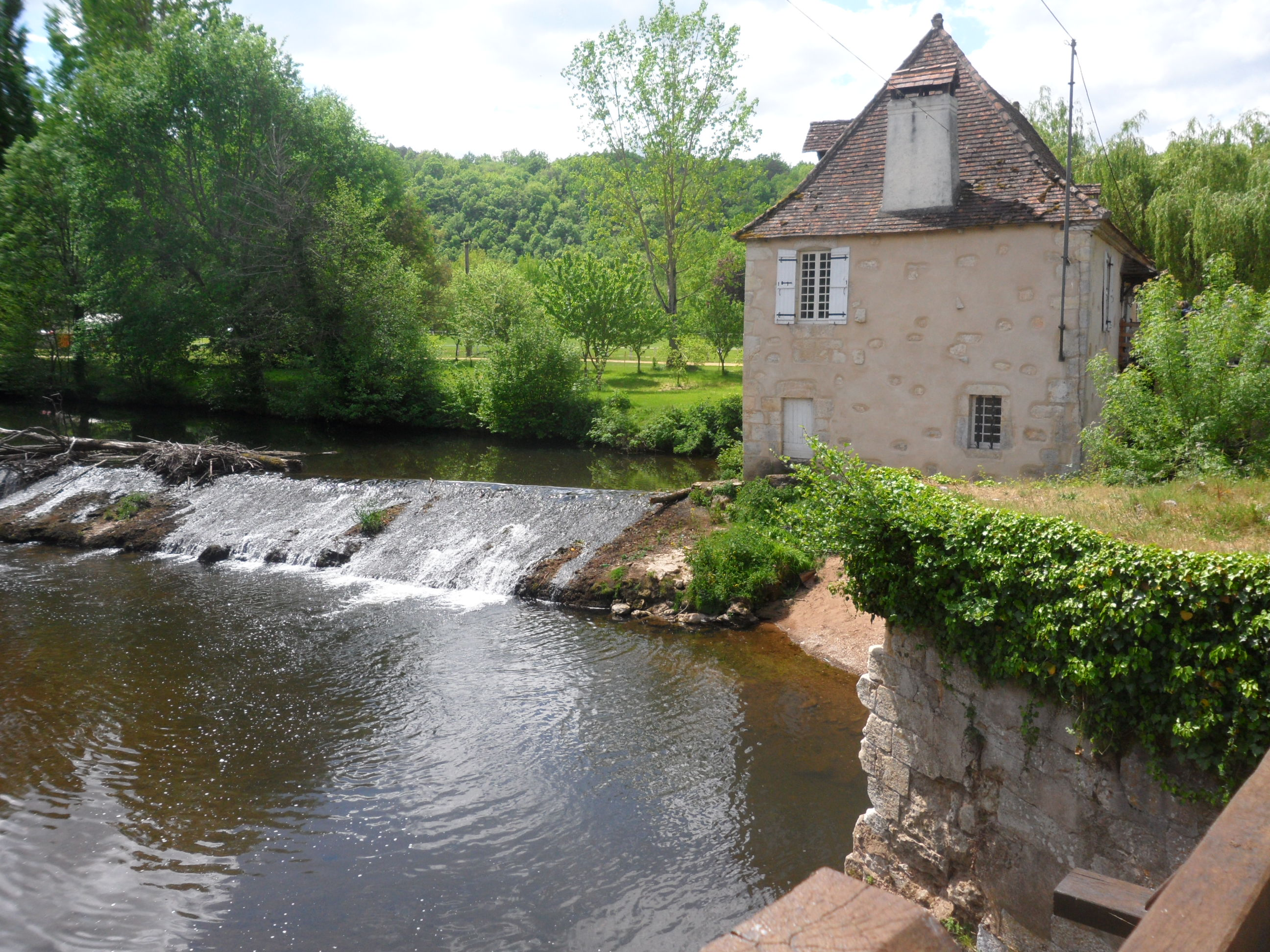

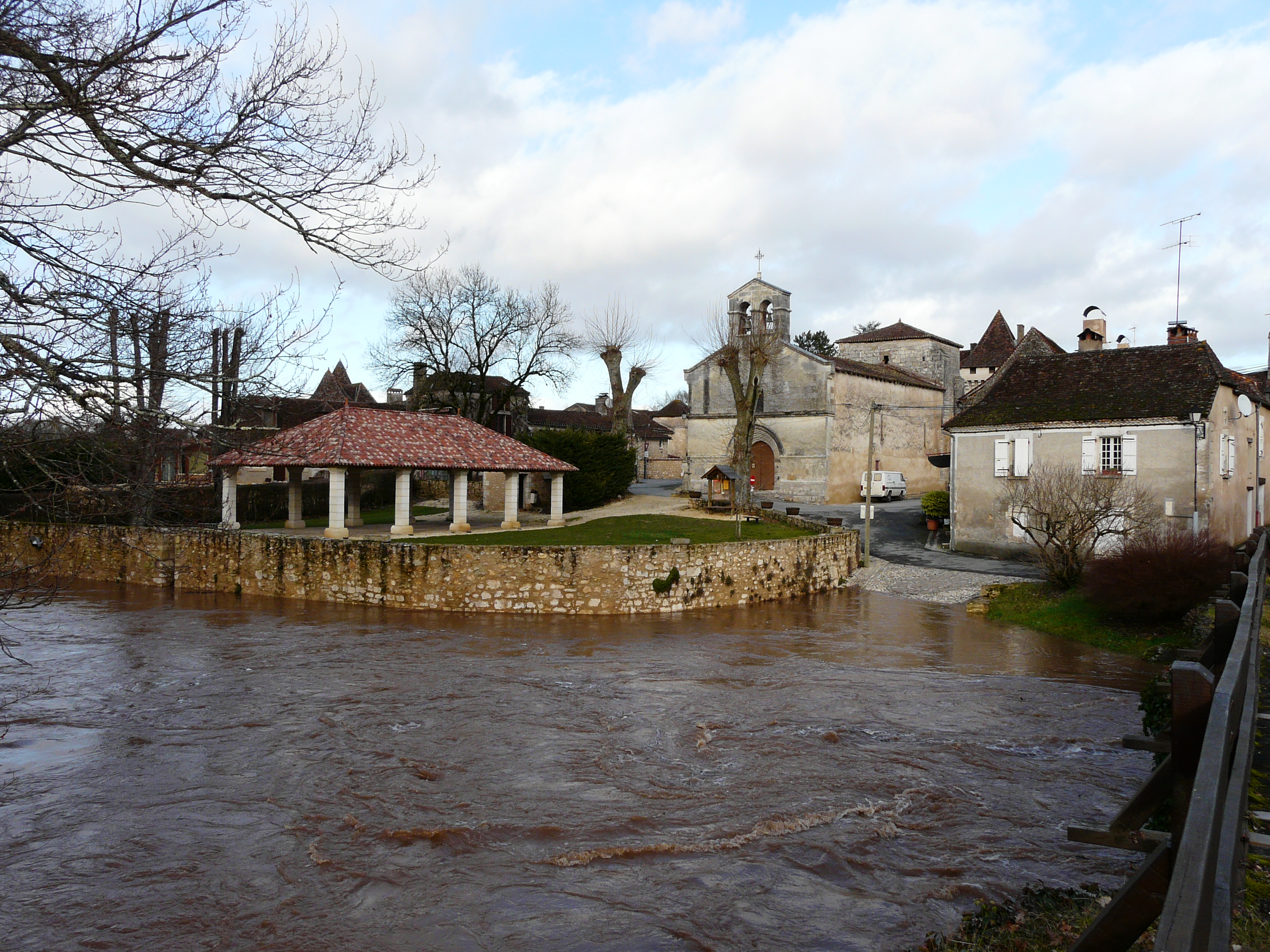

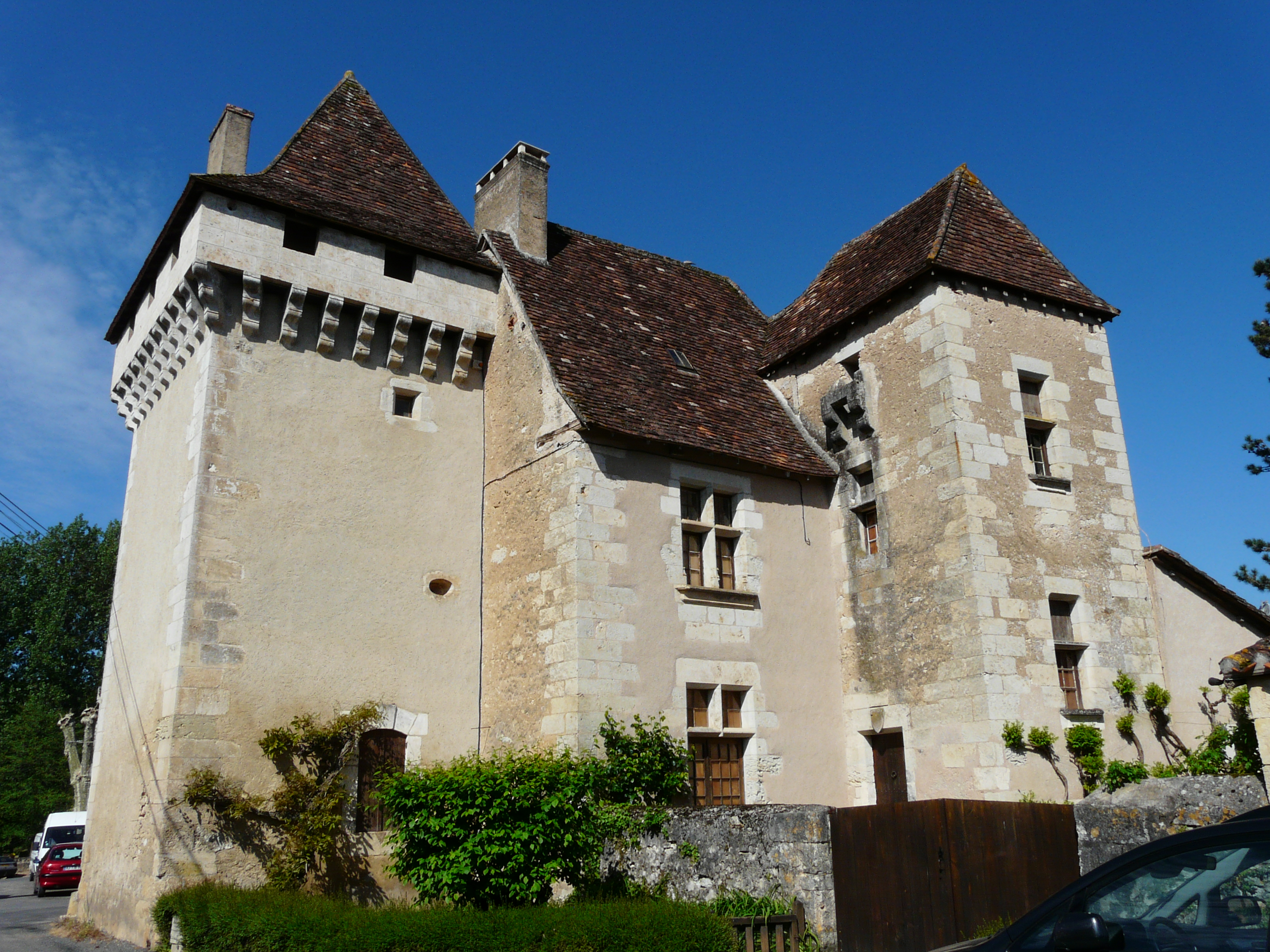

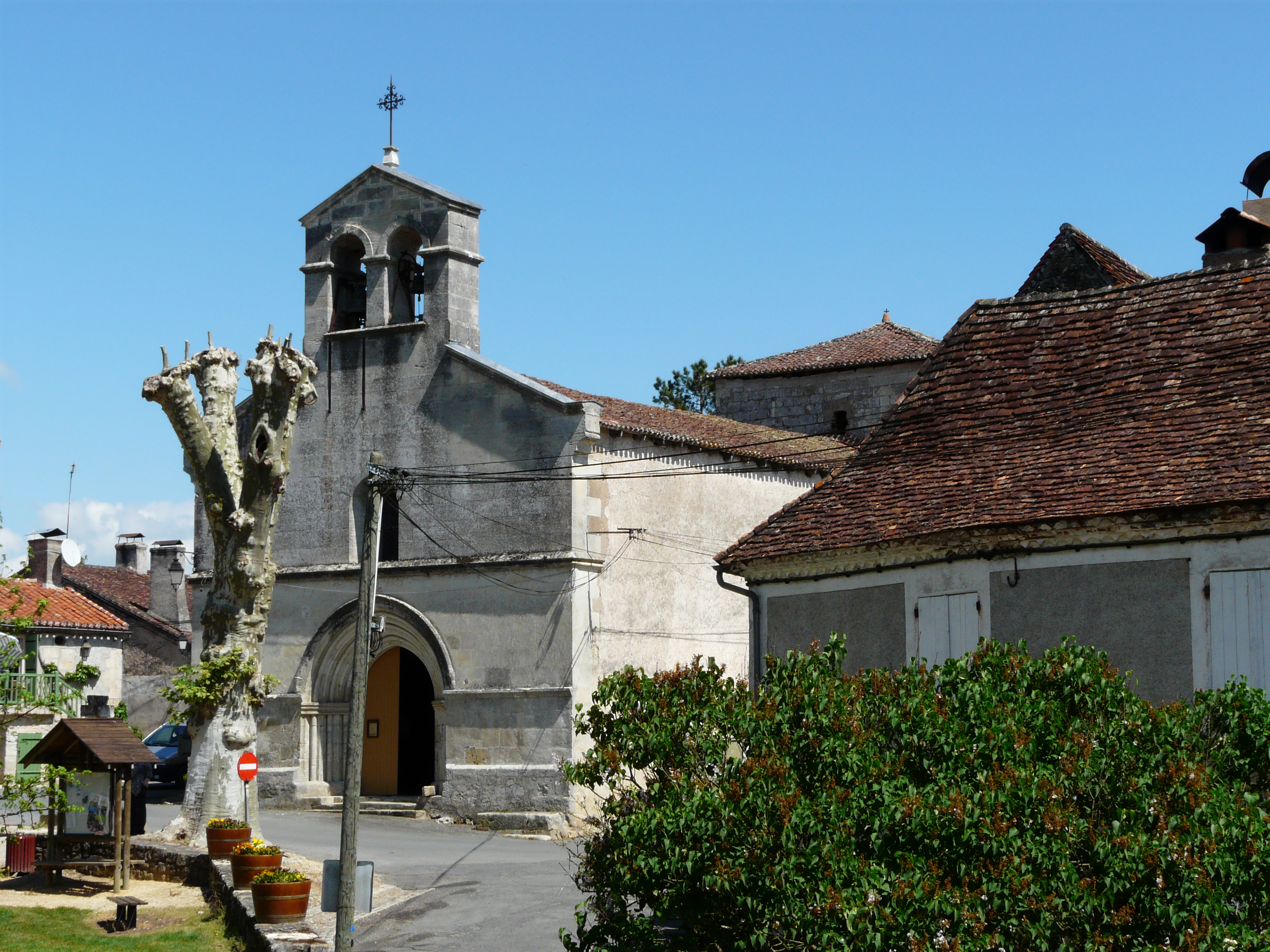

== See also ==
- Communes of the Dordogne department
