= Château d'Eyliac =

Château in the Dordogne, France

Coordinates: 45°09′41″N 0°51′16″E

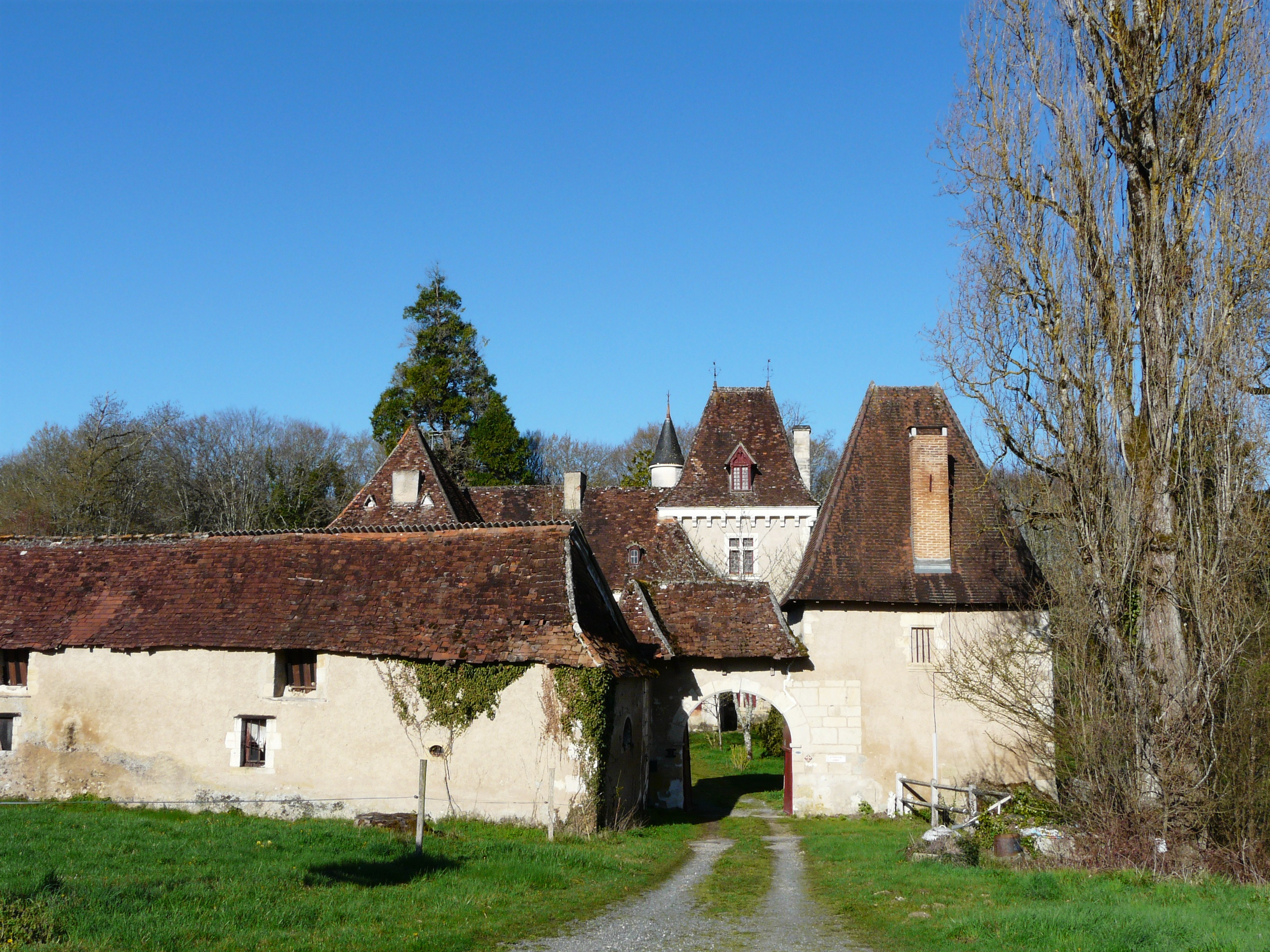
Château d'Eyliac

The Château d'Eyliac is a château in the Périgord, department of Dordogne, Nouvelle Aquitaine, France.
