= Saint-Mesmin, Dordogne =

Saint-Mesmin
- Commune
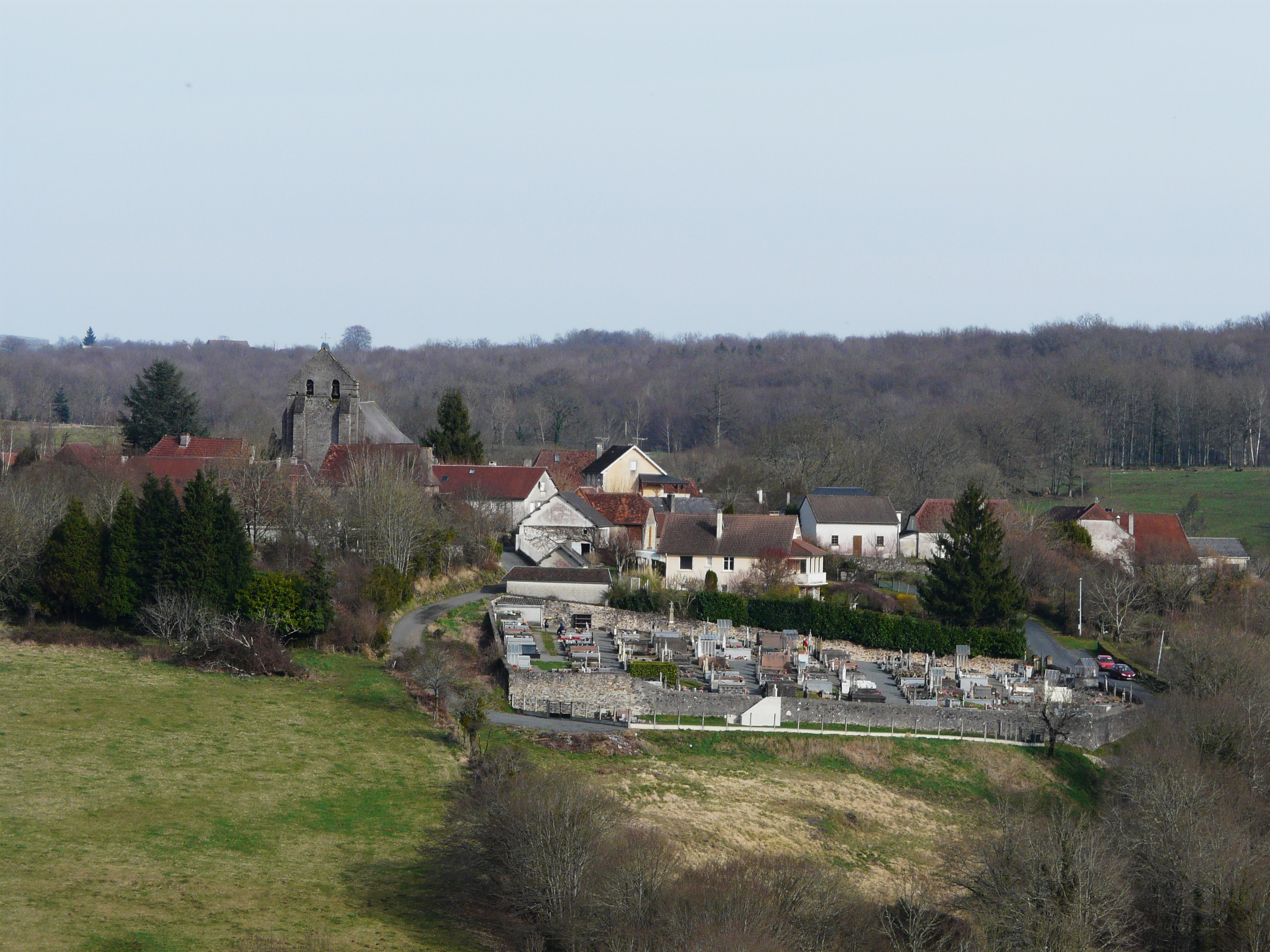
- A general view of Saint-Mesmin

- Coat of arms
- Location of Saint-Mesmin
- Location within France Location within Nouvelle-Aquitaine
- Coordinates: 45°21′11″N 1°12′22″E
- Country: France
- Region: Nouvelle-Aquitaine
- Department: Dordogne
- Arrondissement: Nontron
- Canton: Isle-Loue-Auvézère

Government
  - Mayor (2020–2026): Guy Bouchaud
- Area^{1}: 29.58 km^{2} (11.42 sq mi)
- Elevation: 300 m (980 ft)
- Highest elevation: 415 m (1,362 ft)
- Lowest elevation: 182 m (597 ft)
- Population (2023): 343
  - Density: 11.6/km^{2} (30.0/sq mi)
- Time zone: UTC+01:00 (CET)
  - Summer (DST): UTC+02:00 (CEST)
- INSEE/Postal code: 24464 /24270
- ^{1} French Land Register data, which excludes lakes, ponds, glaciers > 1 km^{2} (0.386 sq mi or 247 acres) and river estuaries.

Saint-Mesmin (French pronunciation: [sɛ̃ mɛmɛ̃]; Limousin: Sent Maimin) is a commune in the Dordogne department in Nouvelle-Aquitaine in southwestern France.

== Geography ==
The commune is located in the north-east corner of the Dordogne department, on a hill above the river Auvézère. The village is located 42 km (26 mi) north-east of Périgueux. The area consists of forests and farmland.

== History ==
From the creation of the departments in 1790 Saint-Mesmin was first included in the Corrèze department. Three years later in 1793 it joined the Dordogne department.

== Population ==
Historical population
Year	Pop.	±% p.a.
1968	534	—
1975	455	−2.26%
1982	393	−2.07%
1990	324	−2.38%
1999	284	−1.45%
2007	275	−0.40%
2012	276	+0.07%
2017	318	+2.87%
2023	343	+1.27%
Source: INSEE

The largest population that the census recorded was 1,168 in 1886. Since World War I, the population has gradually been declining until it reached its lowest point in 2007.

== Sights ==
- The Auvézère has eroded a more than 100 meter deep gorge in limestone rock. There are footpaths through the gorge, offering access to the cascades.
- The Puy des Ages is a 1.5 km (0.93 mi) long rocky ridge on the border of the communes of Saint-Cyr-les-Champagnes and St-Mesmin. Its maximum elevation is 415 m above sea level.

== See also ==
- Communes of the Dordogne department
