= Château de la Chalupie =

Château in Nouvelle-Aquitaine, France

Coordinates: 45°09′38″N 0°50′32″E

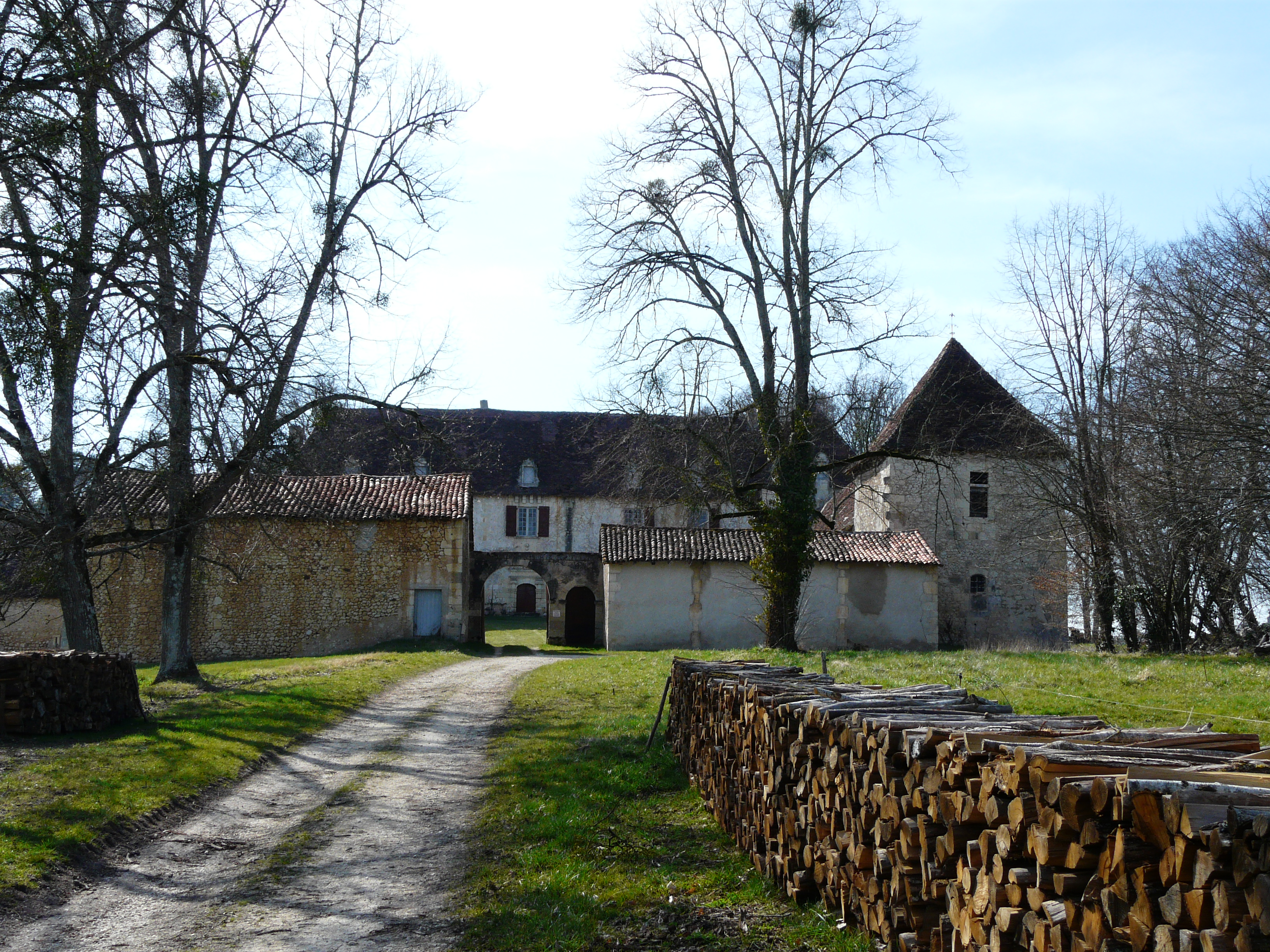

Château de la Chalupie is a château in Dordogne, Nouvelle-Aquitaine, France, in the former Limousin region.
