= Ségur-le-Château =

Ségur-le-Château Segur lo Chasteu (Occitan)
- Commune
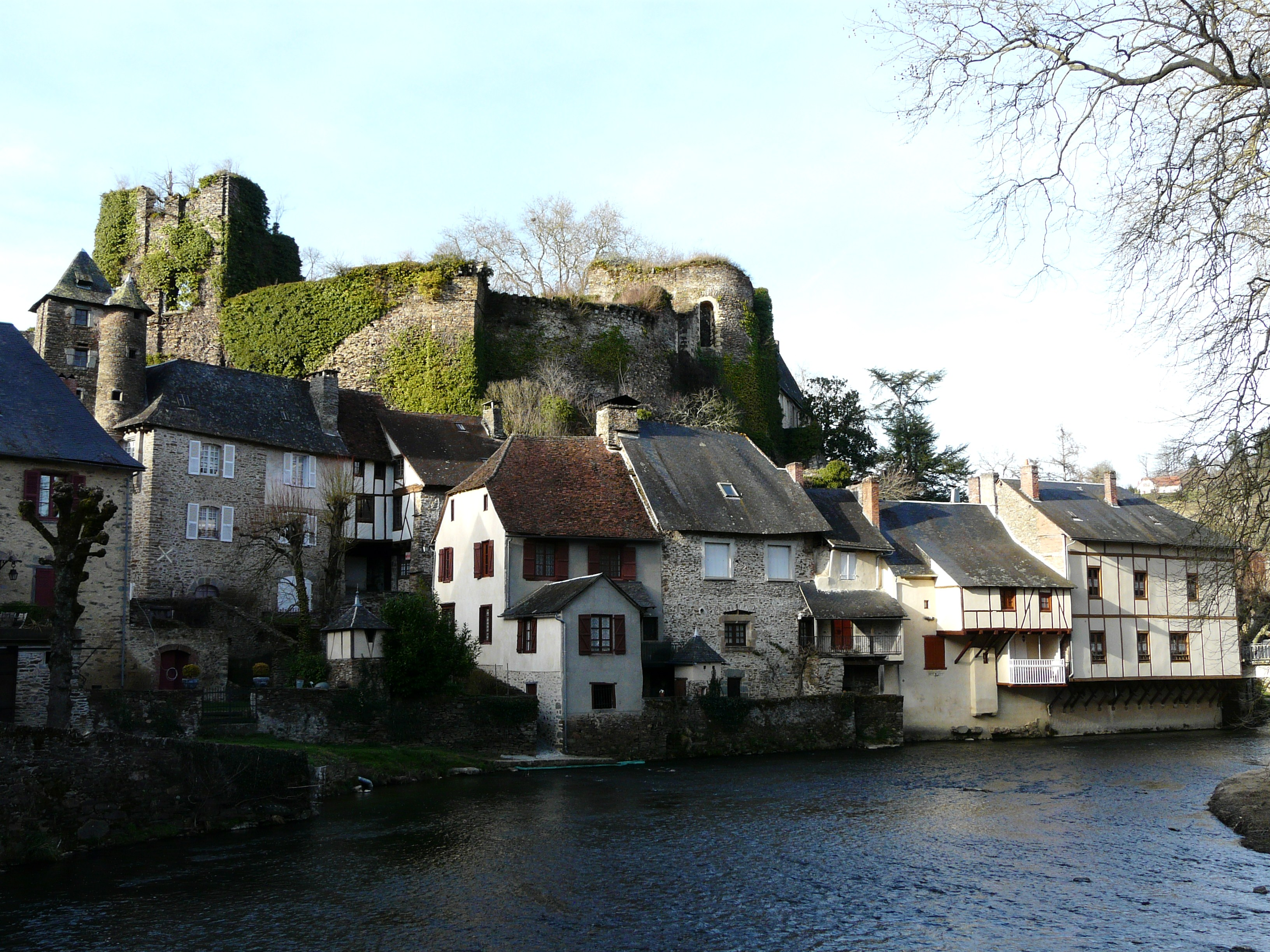
- Buildings within Ségur-le-Château

- Coat of arms
- Location of Ségur-le-Château
- Location within France Location within Nouvelle-Aquitaine
- Coordinates: 45°25′49″N 1°18′21″E
- Country: France
- Region: Nouvelle-Aquitaine
- Department: Corrèze
- Arrondissement: Brive-la-Gaillarde
- Canton: Uzerche

Government
  - Mayor (2021–2026): Roland Pourchet
- Area^{1}: 9.48 km^{2} (3.66 sq mi)
- Highest elevation: 397 m (1,302 ft)
- Lowest elevation: 270 m (890 ft)
- Population (2023): 202
  - Density: 21.3/km^{2} (55.2/sq mi)
- Time zone: UTC+01:00 (CET)
  - Summer (DST): UTC+02:00 (CEST)
- INSEE/Postal code: 19254 /19230
- ^{1} French Land Register data, which excludes lakes, ponds, glaciers > 1 km^{2} (0.386 sq mi or 247 acres) and river estuaries.

Ségur-le-Château (French: [seɡyʁ lə ʃɑto]; Occitan: Segur lo Chasteu) is a commune in the department of Corrèze in central France. It is a member of Les Plus Beaux Villages de France (The Most Beautiful Villages of France) Association.

== History ==
The viscounts of Limoges, also called the viscounts of Ségur created a small principality, whose last heir was Henry IV. Ségur was the main home of these viscounts, in the heart of their domain.

== Population ==
Historical population
| Year | Pop. | ±% p.a. |
|---|---|---|
| 1968 | 401 | — |
| 1975 | 323 | −3.04% |
| 1982 | 304 | −0.86% |
| 1990 | 269 | −1.52% |
| 1999 | 245 | −1.03% |
| 2007 | 228 | −0.89% |
| 2012 | 247 | +1.61% |
| 2017 | 174 | −6.77% |
| 2023 | 202 | +2.52% |
Source: INSEE

== See also ==
- Communes of the Corrèze department
