= Bassillac =

Commune in Dordogne, France

- Part of Bassillac et Auberoche
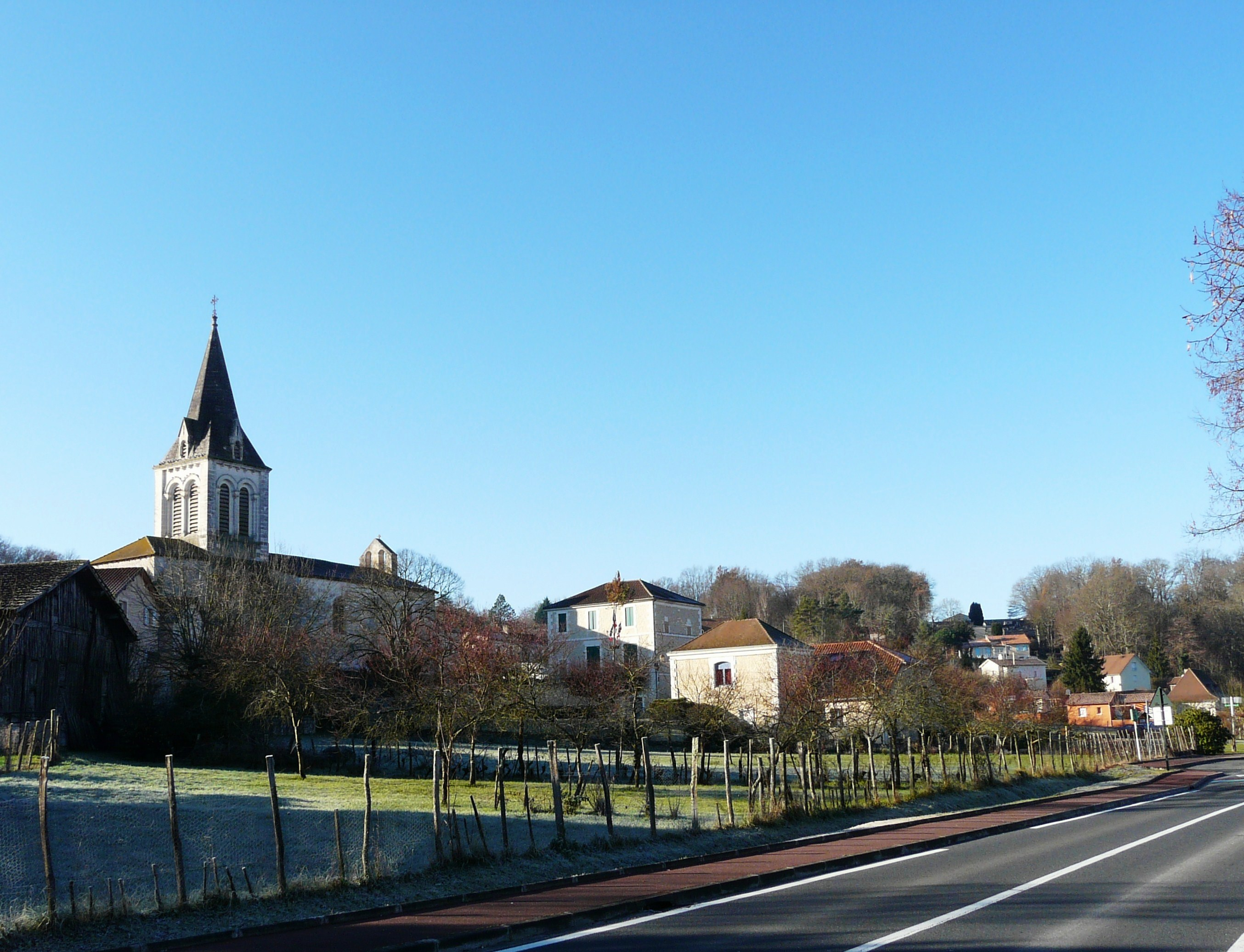
- Location of Bassillac
- Location within France Location within Nouvelle-Aquitaine
- Coordinates: 45°11′29″N 0°48′51″E
- Country: France
- Region: Nouvelle-Aquitaine
- Department: Dordogne
- Arrondissement: Périgueux
- Canton: Isle-Manoire
- Commune: Bassillac et Auberoche
- Area^{1}: 18.73 km^{2} (7.23 sq mi)
- Elevation: 120 m (390 ft)
- Highest elevation: 233 m (764 ft)
- Lowest elevation: 87 m (285 ft)
- Population (2022): 1,868
  - Density: 99.73/km^{2} (258.3/sq mi)
- Time zone: UTC+01:00 (CET)
  - Summer (DST): UTC+02:00 (CEST)
- Postal code: 24330
- ^{1} French Land Register data, which excludes lakes, ponds, glaciers > 1 km^{2} (0.386 sq mi or 247 acres) and river estuaries.

Bassillac (French pronunciation: [basijak]; Occitan: Bassilhac, before 2002: Bassilac) is a former commune in the Dordogne department in southwestern France. On 1 January 2017, it was merged into the new commune Bassillac et Auberoche.

== Population ==
Historical population

Year	Pop.	±% p.a.
1793	682	—
1800	616	−1.44%
1806	656	+1.05%
1821	665	+0.09%
1831	732	+0.96%
1836	810	+2.05%
1841	777	−0.83%
1846	788	+0.28%
1851	838	+1.24%
1856	816	−0.53%
1861	778	−0.95%
1866	785	+0.18%
1872	770	−0.32%
1876	718	−1.73%
1881	737	+0.52%
1886	743	+0.16%
1891	753	+0.27%
1896	765	+0.32%

Year	Pop.	±% p.a.
1901	740	−0.66%
1906	684	−1.56%
1911	673	−0.32%
1921	586	−1.37%
1926	596	+0.34%
1931	588	−0.27%
1936	594	+0.20%
1946	620	+0.43%
1954	533	−1.87%
1962	506	−0.65%
1968	512	+0.20%
1975	701	+4.59%
1982	1,297	+9.19%
1990	1,541	+2.18%
1999	1,755	+1.46%
2006	1,735	−0.16%
2022	1,868	+0.46%

Source: EHESS and INSEE

== See also ==
- Communes of the Dordogne department
