= Canton of Nontron =

Coordinates: 45°33′N 0°39′E

Nontron
- Former canton
- Interactive map of Nontron
- Country: France
- Region: Nouvelle-Aquitaine
- Department: Dordogne
- No. of communes: {{{nbcomm}}}
- Disbanded: 2015
- Area: 266.31 km^{2} (102.82 sq mi)
- Population (2012): 8,810
  - Density: 33.1/km^{2} (85.7/sq mi)

The Canton of Nontron is a former canton of the Dordogne département, in France. It was disbanded following the French canton reorganisation which came into effect in March 2015. It consisted of 8 communes, which joined the canton of Périgord Vert Nontronnais in 2015. It had 8,810 inhabitants (2012).

The lowest point is 115 m in the commune of Javerlhac-et-la-Chapelle-Saint-Robert, the highest point is in Abjat-sur-Bandiat at 355 m, the average elevation is 197 m. The most populated commune was Nontron with 3,212 inhabitants (2012).

== Communes ==
The canton comprised the following communes:

- Abjat-sur-Bandiat
- Augignac
- Le Bourdeix
- Connezac
- Hautefaye
- Javerlhac-et-la-Chapelle-Saint-Robert
- Lussas-et-Nontronneau
- Nontron
- Saint-Estèphe
- Saint-Front-sur-Nizonne
- Saint-Martial-de-Valette
- Saint-Martin-le-Pin
- Savignac-de-Nontron
- Sceau-Saint-Angel
- Teyjat

== Population history ==
Year	Population
1962	9,398
1968	10,240
1975	9,885
1982	9,574
1990	9,435
1999	9,101

== See also ==
- Arrondissements of the Dordogne department
- Cantons of the Dordogne department
- Communes of the Dordogne department
