= Saint-Pardoux-la-Rivière =

- Commune
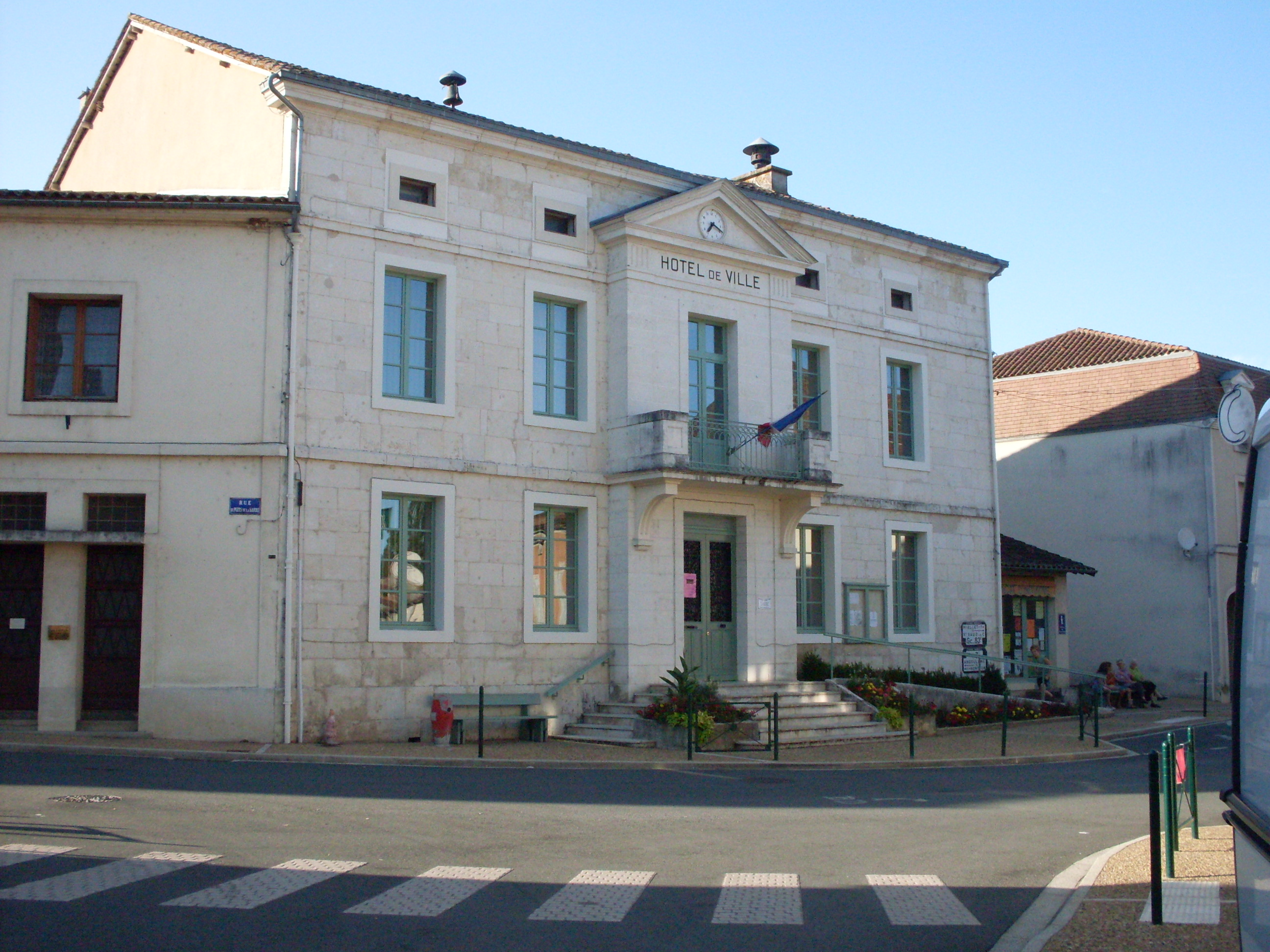
- Town hall

- Coat of arms
- Location of Saint-Pardoux-la-Rivière
- Location within France Location within Nouvelle-Aquitaine
- Coordinates: 45°29′39″N 0°44′48″E
- Country: France
- Region: Nouvelle-Aquitaine
- Department: Dordogne
- Arrondissement: Nontron
- Canton: Périgord Vert Nontronnais

Government
  - Mayor (2020–2026): Sylvie Gouraud
- Area^{1}: 23.84 km^{2} (9.20 sq mi)
- Elevation: 137 m (449 ft)
- Highest elevation: 332 m (1,089 ft)
- Lowest elevation: 132 m (433 ft)
- Population (2023): 1,166
  - Density: 48.91/km^{2} (126.7/sq mi)
- Time zone: UTC+01:00 (CET)
  - Summer (DST): UTC+02:00 (CEST)
- INSEE/Postal code: 24479 /24470
- ^{1} French Land Register data, which excludes lakes, ponds, glaciers > 1 km^{2} (0.386 sq mi or 247 acres) and river estuaries.

Saint-Pardoux-la-Rivière (French pronunciation: [sɛ̃ paʁdu la ʁivjɛʁ]; Occitan: Sent Pardon la Ribiera) is a commune in the Dordogne department in Nouvelle-Aquitaine in southwestern France. It forms part of the Parc naturel régional Périgord Limousin.

== Etymology ==
The Occitan Sent Pardol is derived from Saint Pardulphus (Sanctus Pardulphus), la ribiera means 'the river', i.e. the Dronne.

== Geography ==
Saint-Pardoux-la-Rivière is surrounded by the following communes:

- Champs-Romain in the north.
- Saint-Saud-Lacoussière in the northeast.
- Milhac-de-Nontron in the southeast.
- Saint-Front-la-Rivière in the south.
- Sceau-Saint-Angel in the west.
- Nontron in the northwest.
- Savignac-de-Nontron in the northwest (the communes only touch at a single point).

Besides the village center the commune of Saint-Pardoux-la-Rivière comprises the following hamlets:

Beaumont, Bon Ombre, Bordessoule, Bos-Brûlat, Brande, Brin, Chaumeille, Chez Bathe, Chez Boissard, Chez Boutard, Chez Neymard, Jamaye, La Briderie, La Dorie, La Font du Prince, La Grange, La Nanotte, La Plassade, Langlade, Lapeyronnie, Le Buisson, Le Châtenet, Le Clos, Le Couvent, Le Maine, Le Mandereau, Le Queyroi, Le Petit Villars, Les Batisses, Les Combes, Les Granges, Les Rebières, Les Roches, Lescure, Maliba, Négrecombe, Neuil, Noujarède, Puy d'Arnac, and Puypelat.

The commune's territory is traversed roughly centrally by the River Dronne. The northern boundary to Champs-Romain is formed by the river, which is occupying a narrow canyon. After initially following a southwesterly direction it then swings to the south. Before reaching the village the valley widens. Alongside a ford over the river Saint-Pardoux was founded.

A right tributary of the Dronne, the Ruisseau de Lachenaud, forms the western continuation of the northern boundary to Champs-Romain. Its course is directed to the southeast. Near the center of Saint-Pardoux the Dronne receives a left tributary, the Ruisseau de Chantres.

The topographically lowest point in the commune with 132 meters above sea level is situated at the southern exit of the Dronne near Jamaye, the highest point with 332 meters above sea level near Bos Brûlat in the very northeastern corner.

== Geology ==
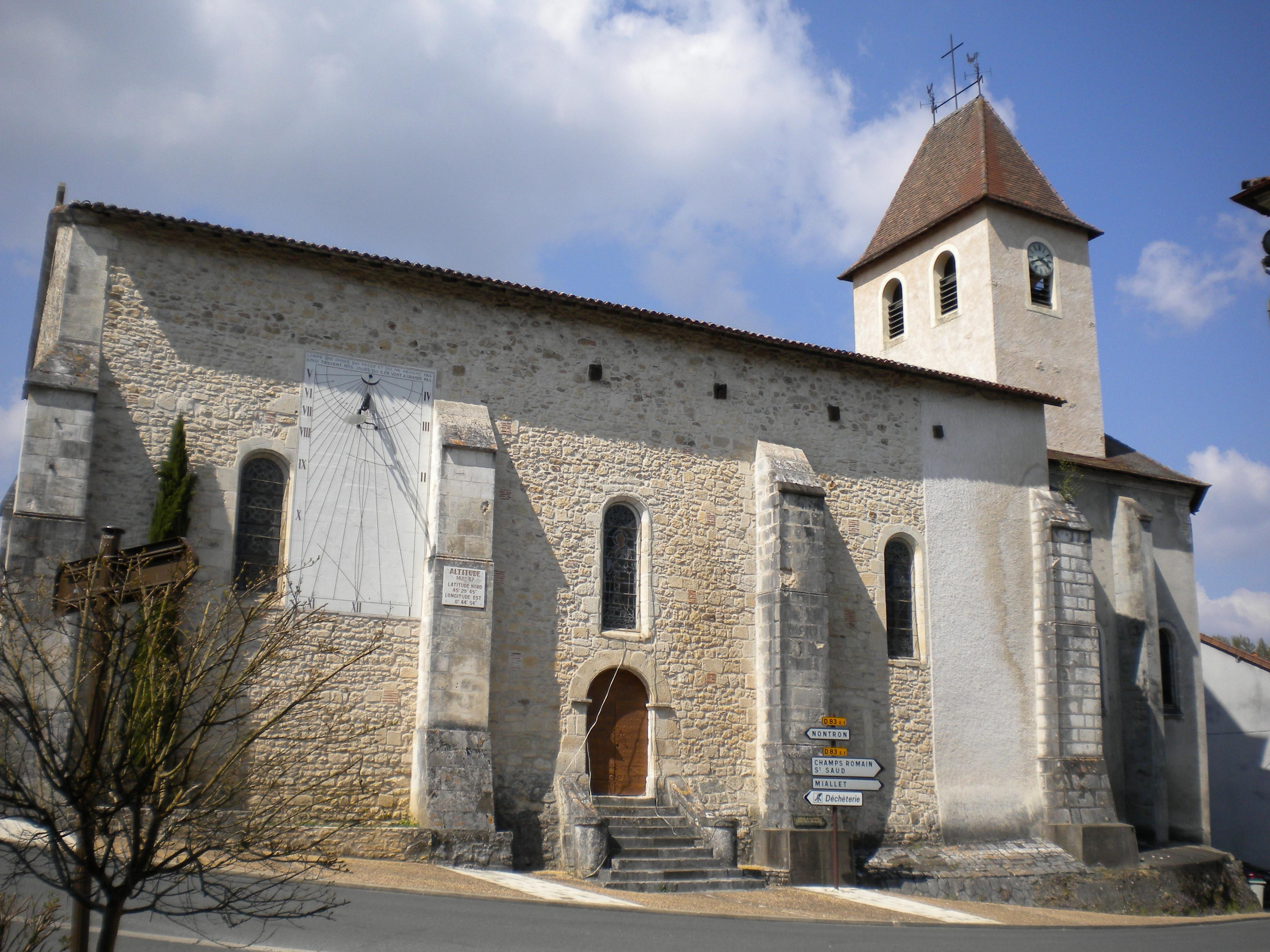
The south face of the church in Saint-Pardoux-la-Rivière with its sun dial

The commune's territory is divided into two contrasting domains by two crossing fault lines (N 065 and N 160). To the north and east of these faults one encounters the Variscan basement rocks of the northwestern Massif Central, which also stand out topographically. The southern lowlands around the village center are occupied by sediments of the northern Aquitaine Basin. Along the border faults the basement rocks were raised relative to the sedimentary cover.

The oldest unit of the basement rocks are Neoproterozoic mica schist of the Parautochthonous Mica schist Unit (PMU). They can be seen in the east near Chantres and Le Châtenet. They were intruded during the Pennsylvanian by the Saint-Mathieu Leucogranite. The leucogranite crops out in the upper reaches of the Dronne valley. To the north of the N 065-striking fault the basement rocks consist of Plagioclase-bearing paragneisses. In some places these are intruded by small granodiorite bodies belonging to the Piégut-Pluviers Granodiorite or by leptynites of Ordovician age.

The flat-lying sediments surrounding the village center are mainly of Jurassic age and comprise Lias as well as Dogger limestones. The Lias is composed of Hettangian (sandstones, coarse sandstones and conglomerates), Sinemurian (oolithic limestones, sometimes dolomitic) and Toarcian (claystones and grey marls). Near the border faults the Lias can be silicified. The Toarcian clays were once quarried by a (now redundant) tile factory. The Dogger consists of cryptocrystalline limestones, bioclastic limestones and oolithic limestones spanning the period Upper Bajocian and Bathonian. Close to the border faults crop out the so-called sidérolithique (iron-rich, reddish, clayey sands) and solidified, conglomeratic alluvial deposits. Both formations are most likely of Eocene age. All the aforementioned sedimentary units can be covered by colluvial gravels of Pleistocene age. In the Dronne valley gravelly terrasses belonging to the Mindel stage and the Würm stage can be observed. Limestone debris mantelling certain hill slopes is due to gelifraction processes during the last ice age.

Worth mentioning are certain mineral occurrences like silver-bearing galena in the paragneisses or baryte mainly within the Lias. Occasional tourmaline can also be found in the paragneisses. Manganese (manganese dioxide) associated with nontronite was once mined near Le Mandereau. The Neuil mine, situated in the paragneisses, contains apart from galena and baryte the minerals chalcopyrite, gypsum, marcasite, pyrite, pyromorphite and sphalerite.

== History ==
Between the 13th century and the French Revolution there was once a monastery in Saint-Pardoux-la-Rivière. Hardly anything is left of it now, because most of its building stones were used in the construction of the village. The church goes back to the 17th and 18th centuries. It underwent extensive renovation during the 19th century with the steeple being completely rebuilt. The Château de Vaugoubert at the Dronne also goes back to the 17th century. From an even older castle only the round tower is left.

== Population ==
Historical population
Year	Pop.	±% p.a.
1968	1,360	—
1975	1,347	−0.14%
1982	1,309	−0.41%
1990	1,174	−1.35%
1999	1,091	−0.81%
2007	1,149	+0.65%
2012	1,210	+1.04%
2017	1,179	−0.52%
2023	1,166	−0.18%
Source: INSEE

== Sights ==
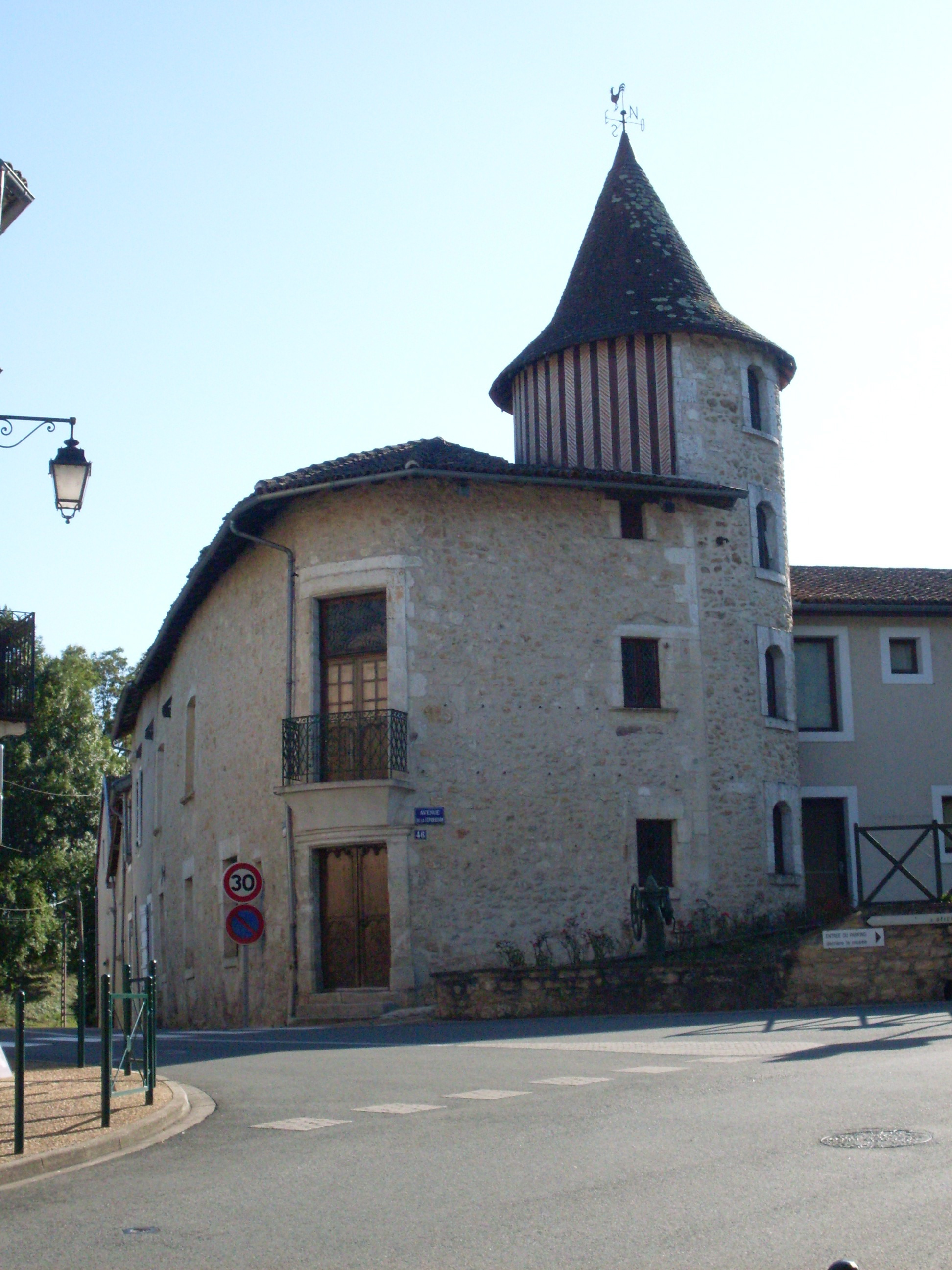
The post card museum

- The church of Saint-Pardoux-la-Rivière with its sun dial.
- The postcard museum. It has a vast collection of postcards from the Périgord dating back to the years 1898–1920.

== See also ==
- Communes of the Dordogne department

== Sources ==
- Floc'h, J.-P. et al. Feuille Nontron. Carte géologique de la France à 1/50000. BRGM.
- Guillot, P.-L. et al. Feuille Thiviers. Carte géologique de la France à 1/50000. BRGM.
