= Saint-Estèphe =

Saint-Estèphe may refer to:

- Saint-Estèphe, Gironde
- Saint-Estèphe, Dordogne
- Saint-Estèphe AOC, Appellation d'Origine Contrôlée for red wine in the Bordeaux region
- Saint Estephe (horse), a Thoroughbred racehorse
