= Saint-Martin-le-Pin =

- Commune
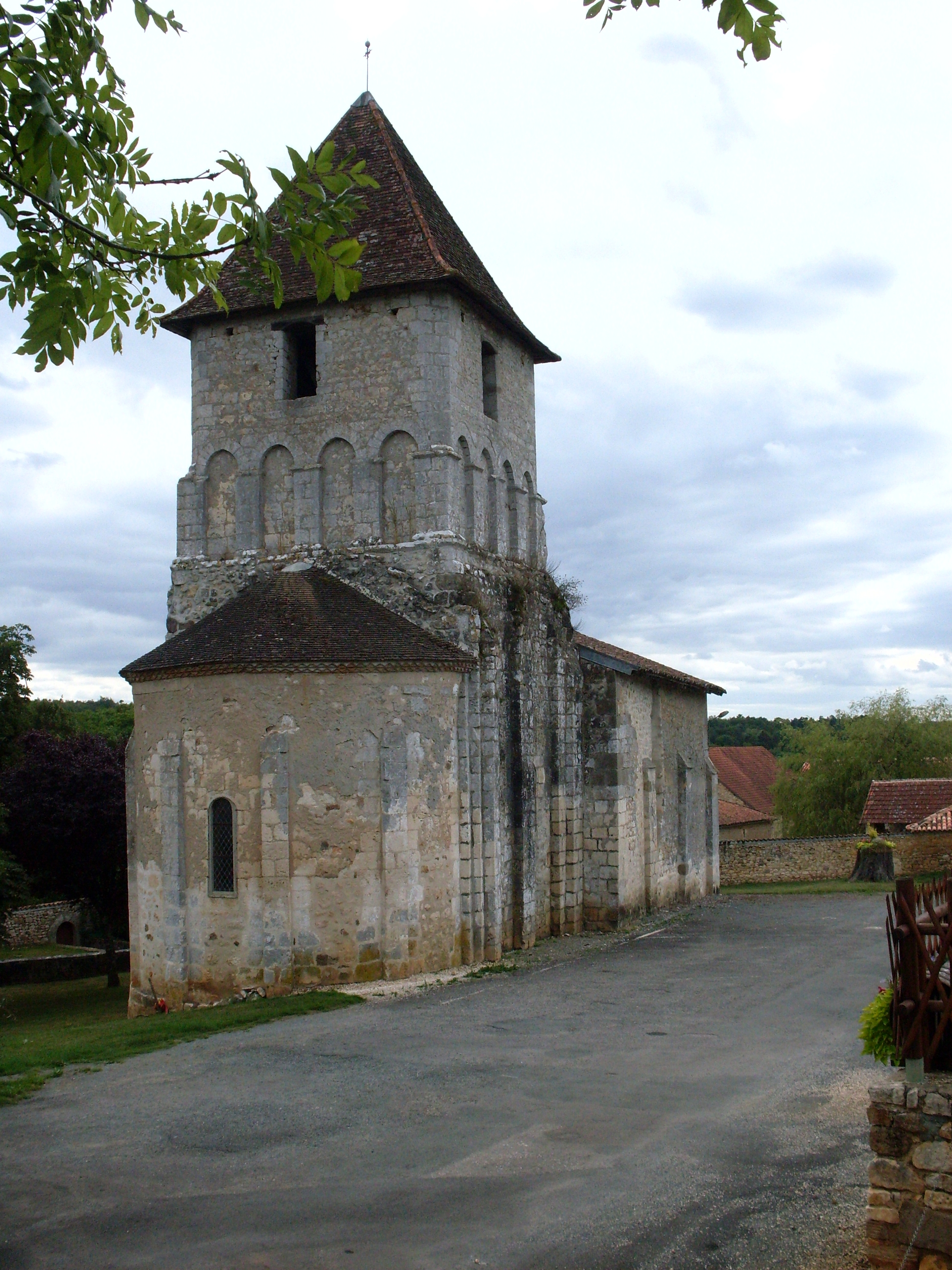
- The church in Saint-Martin-le-Pin
- Location of Saint-Martin-le-Pin
- Location within France Location within Nouvelle-Aquitaine
- Coordinates: 45°33′24″N 0°36′43″E
- Country: France
- Region: Nouvelle-Aquitaine
- Department: Dordogne
- Arrondissement: Nontron
- Canton: Périgord Vert Nontronnais

Government
  - Mayor (2020–2026): Michèle Arlot
- Area^{1}: 15.54 km^{2} (6.00 sq mi)
- Elevation: 135 m (443 ft)
- Highest elevation: 302 m (991 ft)
- Lowest elevation: 127 m (417 ft)
- Population (2023): 279
  - Density: 18.0/km^{2} (46.5/sq mi)
- Time zone: UTC+01:00 (CET)
  - Summer (DST): UTC+02:00 (CEST)
- INSEE/Postal code: 24458 /24300
- ^{1} French Land Register data, which excludes lakes, ponds, glaciers > 1 km^{2} (0.386 sq mi or 247 acres) and river estuaries.

Saint-Martin-le-Pin (French pronunciation: [sɛ̃ maʁtɛ̃ lə pɛ̃]; Limousin: Sent Martin lo Pench or Sent Martin lu Pench ) is a commune in the Dordogne department in Nouvelle-Aquitaine in southwestern France. It is part of the Regional Natural Park Périgord Limousin.

== Geography ==
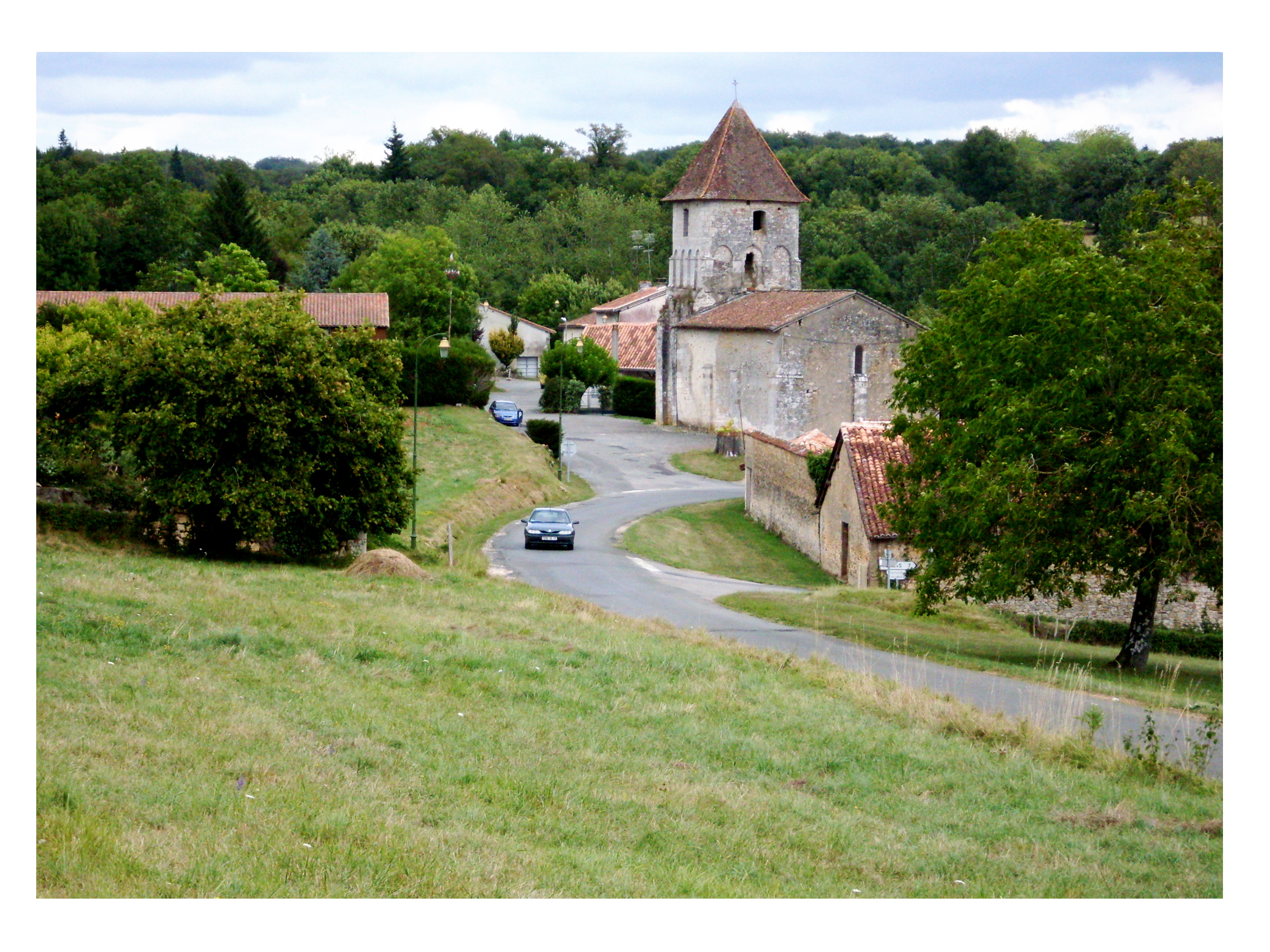
Saint-Martin-le-Pin with romanesque church seen from the West

Saint-Martin-le-Pin is situated along the D 94 about 5 kilometers northwest of Nontron. The boundary with Nontron to the southeast is the Ruisseau des Vergnes, a southwest-flowing right tributary of the Bandiat. The commune's territory reaches the Bandiat river itself in the southwest, forming a natural boundary with the neighbouring communes Saint-Martial-de-Valette in the south and Lussas-et-Nontronneau in the southwest. The commune's boundary to Javerlhac-et-la-Chapelle-Saint-Robert in the northwest and Le Bourdeix farther north is the Doue river, also a smaller right tributary of the Bandiat.

Saint-Martin-le-Pin can also be reached via the D 75 following the Bandiat valley from Nontron to Javerlhac.

Besides the main village there are many hamlets and single farms for example Ars, Blanchetière, Chantemerle, Chez Thomas, Crachat, Jourdonnières, La Borderie, La Combe au Cros, La Tuilière, Le Moulin de chez Jouanaud, Les Cazes, Lespinasse, Loradour, Mérignac, Pas Brouillet, Ribeyrolle, Talivaud, and Tranchecouyère.

== Geology ==
The commune's territory is underlain in its totality by Variscan basement rocks (Piégut-Pluviers Granodiorite). Transgressing the basement from the West are liassic sediments belonging to the Aquitanian Basin. The base conglomerate can be seen near La Chapoulie. Stratigraphically higher follow arkoses, dolomites and limestones. A NW-SE striking fault zone originating in Nontron traverses the territory and raises the Northeastern basement block. Movements along this fault zone must have been going on well into the Pleistocene, because one can observe stream rejuvenation along some of the southwestward-draining creeks. This fault zone is strongly mineralised in mainly baryte, but there is also galena, sphalerite, pyrite and the rather rare cadmium mineral greenockite. This fault zone has been mined in the past, the shaft of the mine de la Mairie still can be seen in the village. Associated with the ores is an intensive recrystallization and silicification of the country rocks along the fault line. Between 1825 and 1850 manganese was mined near Talivaud in the contact region between the arkoses and the overlying Sidérolithique, iron-rich Tertiary sediments.

The limestones sometimes develop karst phenomena like caves (near Blanchetière).

The floodplain of the Bandiat is infilled by alluvial Pleistocene sands with occasional intercalated layers of polished quartz pebbles.

== History ==
The romanesque village church Saint-Martin dates back to the 12th century and has been classified in 1942 as Monument historique. Remarkable is its entry.

Before 1789 the commune was called Saint-Martin-le-Peint. Saint Martin therefore was not associated with the pine tree, but rather was "painted".

=== Population ===
Historical population
Year	Pop.	±% p.a.
1968	405	—
1975	311	−3.70%
1982	292	−0.90%
1990	303	+0.46%
1999	305	+0.07%
2007	300	−0.21%
2012	289	−0.74%
2017	271	−1.28%
2023	279	+0.49%
Source: INSEE

== Gallery ==
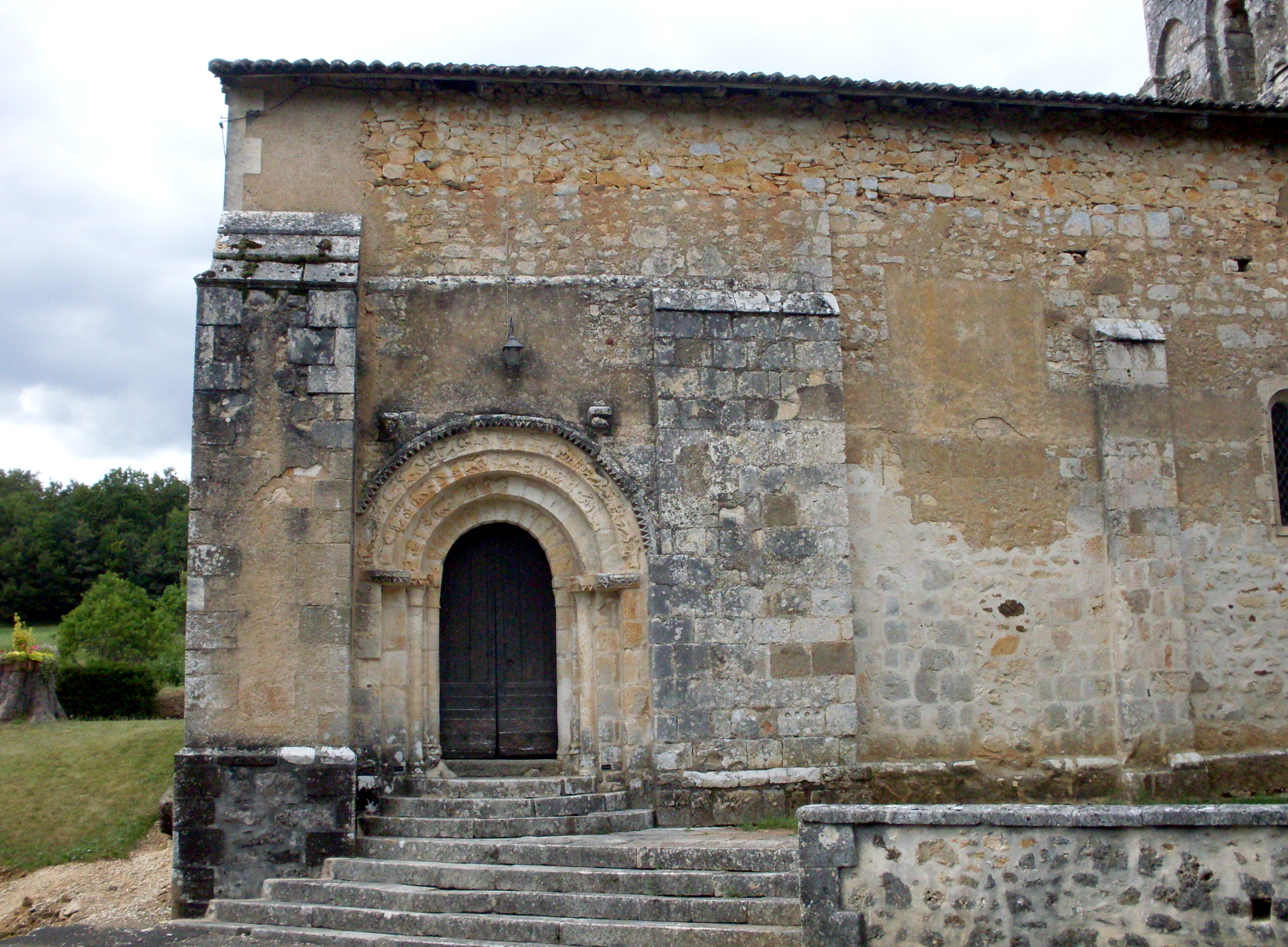
Entry

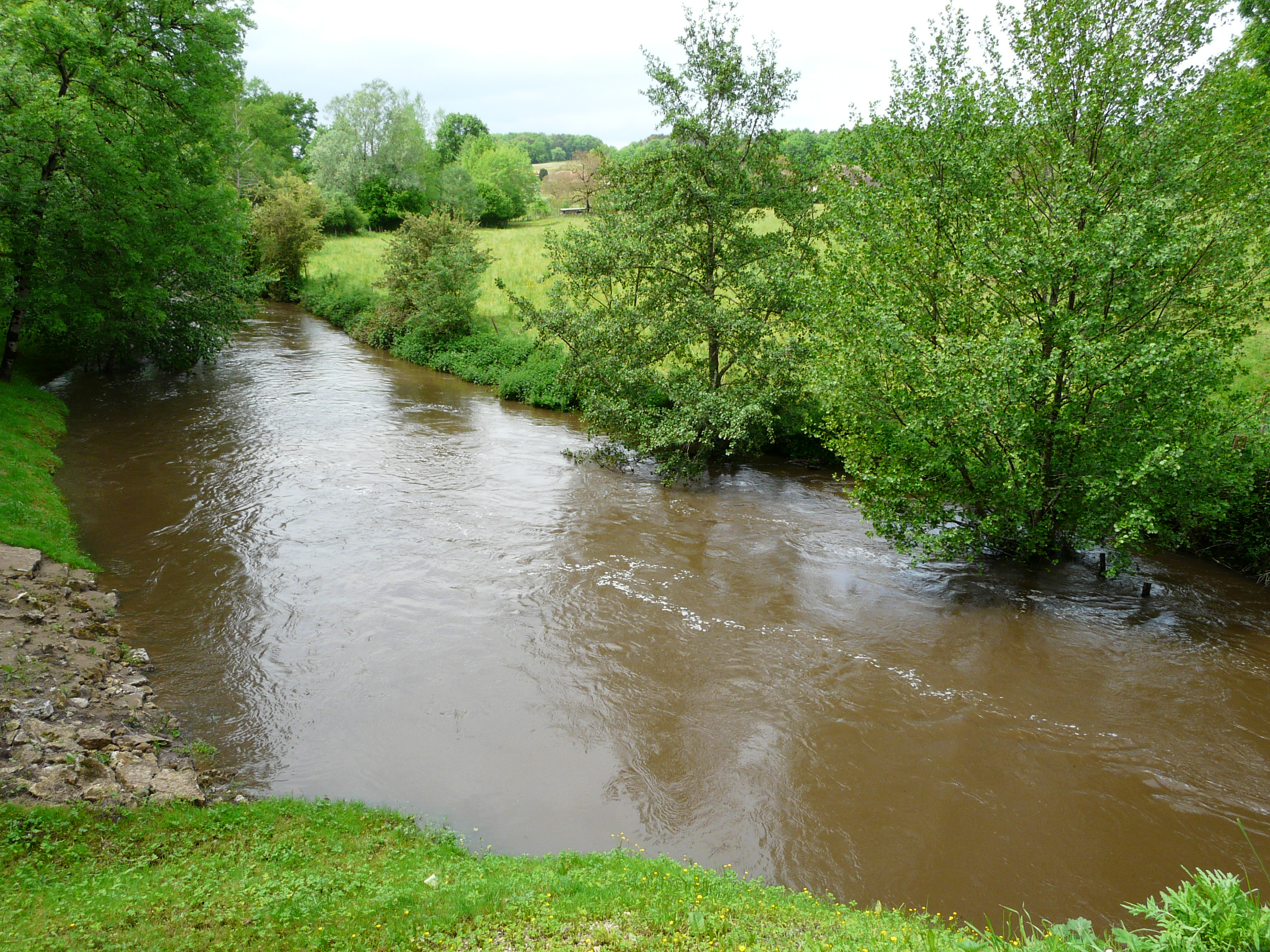
The Bandiat river downstream from the bridge near Ars

== See also ==
- Communes of the Dordogne department
