= Varaignes =

- Commune
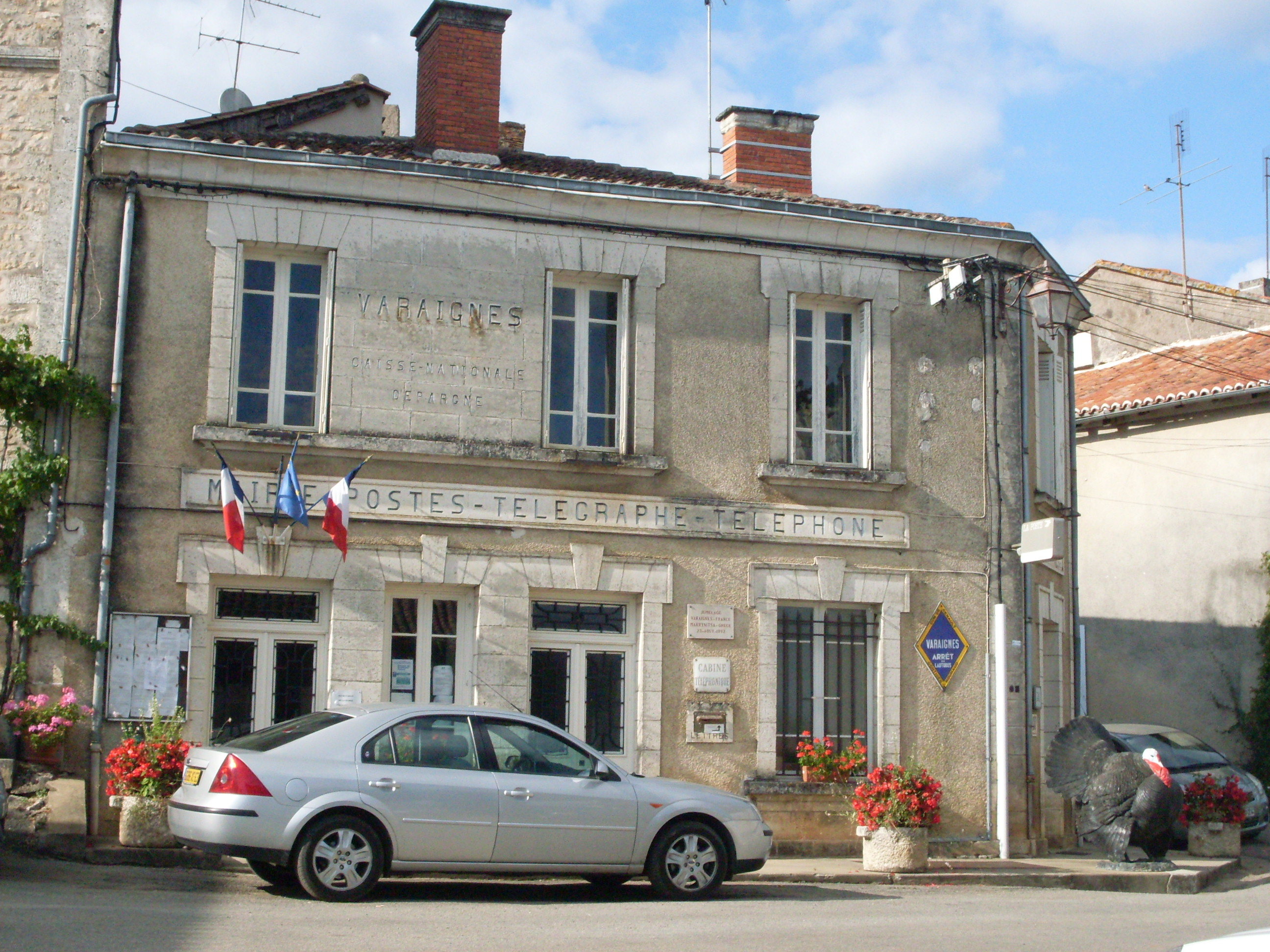
- The town hall in Varaignes

- Coat of arms
- Location of Varaignes
- Location within France Location within Nouvelle-Aquitaine
- Coordinates: 45°35′56″N 0°31′54″E
- Country: France
- Region: Nouvelle-Aquitaine
- Department: Dordogne
- Arrondissement: Nontron
- Canton: Périgord Vert Nontronnais

Government
  - Mayor (2020–2026): Ghislaine Le Moël
- Area^{1}: 16.60 km^{2} (6.41 sq mi)
- Elevation: 144 m (472 ft)
- Highest elevation: 241 m (791 ft)
- Lowest elevation: 115 m (377 ft)
- Population (2023): 358
  - Density: 21.6/km^{2} (55.9/sq mi)
- Time zone: UTC+01:00 (CET)
  - Summer (DST): UTC+02:00 (CEST)
- INSEE/Postal code: 24565 /24360
- ^{1} French Land Register data, which excludes lakes, ponds, glaciers > 1 km^{2} (0.386 sq mi or 247 acres) and river estuaries.

Varaignes (French pronunciation: [vaʁɛɲ]; Occitan: Varanha) is a commune in the Dordogne department in Nouvelle-Aquitaine in southwestern France.

== Population ==
Historical population
Year	Pop.	±% p.a.
1968	457	—
1975	436	−0.67%
1982	436	+0.00%
1990	432	−0.12%
1999	418	−0.37%
2007	414	−0.12%
2012	422	+0.38%
2017	403	−0.92%
2023	358	−1.95%
Source: INSEE

== International relations ==
Varaignes is twinned with Makrinitsa, Greece.

== See also ==
- Communes of the Dordogne department
