= Champniers-et-Reilhac =

- Commune
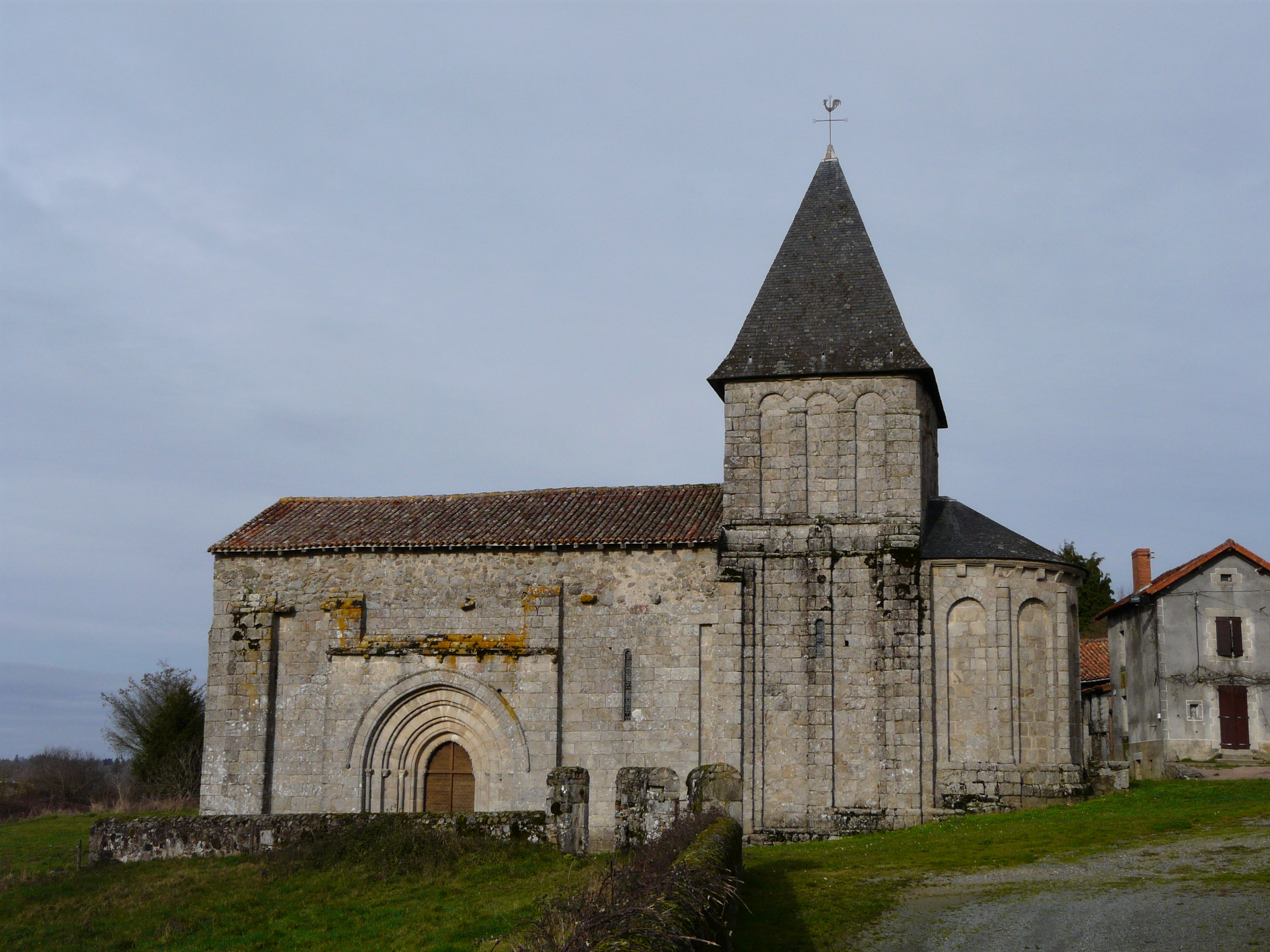
- The church in Reilhac
- Location of Champniers-et-Reilhac
- Location within France Location within Nouvelle-Aquitaine
- Coordinates: 45°40′24″N 0°43′55″E
- Country: France
- Region: Nouvelle-Aquitaine
- Department: Dordogne
- Arrondissement: Nontron
- Canton: Périgord Vert Nontronnais

Government
  - Mayor (2020–2026): Daniel Védrenne
- Area^{1}: 20.40 km^{2} (7.88 sq mi)
- Elevation: 298 m (978 ft)
- Highest elevation: 360 m (1,180 ft)
- Lowest elevation: 185 m (607 ft)
- Population (2023): 541
  - Density: 26.5/km^{2} (68.7/sq mi)
- Time zone: UTC+01:00 (CET)
  - Summer (DST): UTC+02:00 (CEST)
- INSEE/Postal code: 24100 /24360
- ^{1} French Land Register data, which excludes lakes, ponds, glaciers > 1 km^{2} (0.386 sq mi or 247 acres) and river estuaries.

Champniers-et-Reilhac (French pronunciation: [ʃɑ̃nje e ʁɛjak]; Occitan: Champs Niers e Relhac) is a commune in the Dordogne department in Nouvelle-Aquitaine in southwestern France.

== Population ==
Historical population
Year	Pop.	±% p.a.
1968	661	—
1975	554	−2.49%
1982	548	−0.16%
1990	544	−0.09%
1999	533	−0.23%
2007	508	−0.60%
2012	500	−0.32%
2017	455	−1.87%
2023	541	+2.93%
Source: INSEE

== See also ==
- Communes of the Dordogne department
