= Busserolles =

- Commune
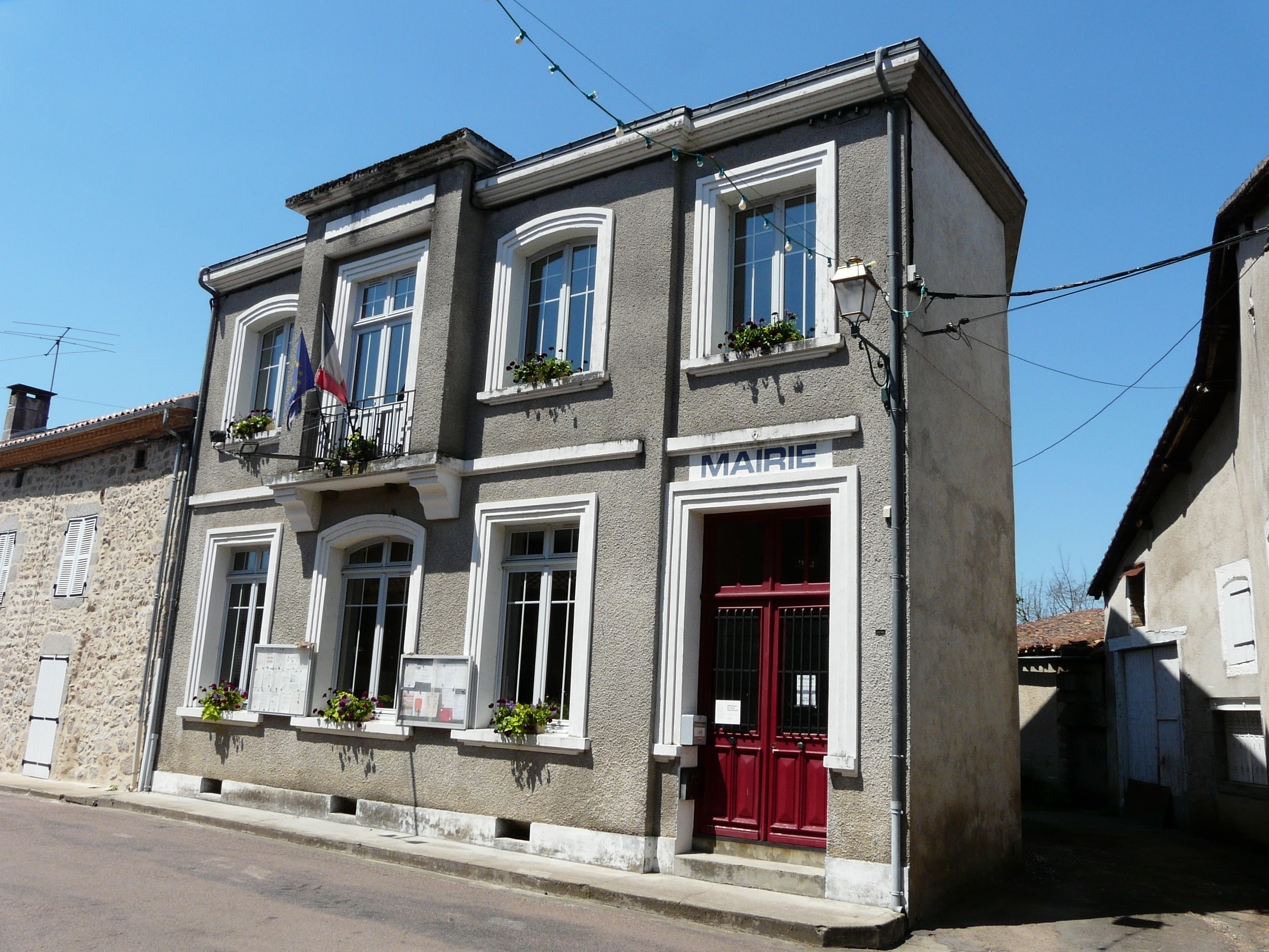
- The town hall in Busserolles
- Location of Busserolles
- Location within France Location within Nouvelle-Aquitaine
- Coordinates: 45°40′37″N 0°38′35″E
- Country: France
- Region: Nouvelle-Aquitaine
- Department: Dordogne
- Arrondissement: Nontron
- Canton: Périgord Vert Nontronnais

Government
  - Mayor (2020–2026): Nathalie Andrieux
- Area^{1}: 32.46 km^{2} (12.53 sq mi)
- Elevation: 156 m (512 ft)
- Highest elevation: 303 m (994 ft)
- Lowest elevation: 135 m (443 ft)
- Population (2023): 516
  - Density: 15.9/km^{2} (41.2/sq mi)
- Time zone: UTC+01:00 (CET)
  - Summer (DST): UTC+02:00 (CEST)
- INSEE/Postal code: 24070 /24360
- ^{1} French Land Register data, which excludes lakes, ponds, glaciers > 1 km^{2} (0.386 sq mi or 247 acres) and river estuaries.

Busserolles is a commune in the Dordogne department in southwestern France.

== Population ==
Historical population
Year	Pop.	±% p.a.
1968	818	—
1975	728	−1.65%
1982	616	−2.36%
1990	569	−0.99%
1999	507	−1.27%
2007	552	+1.07%
2012	545	−0.25%
2017	503	−1.59%
2023	516	+0.43%
Source: INSEE

== See also ==
- Communes of the Dordogne department
