= Soudat =

- Commune
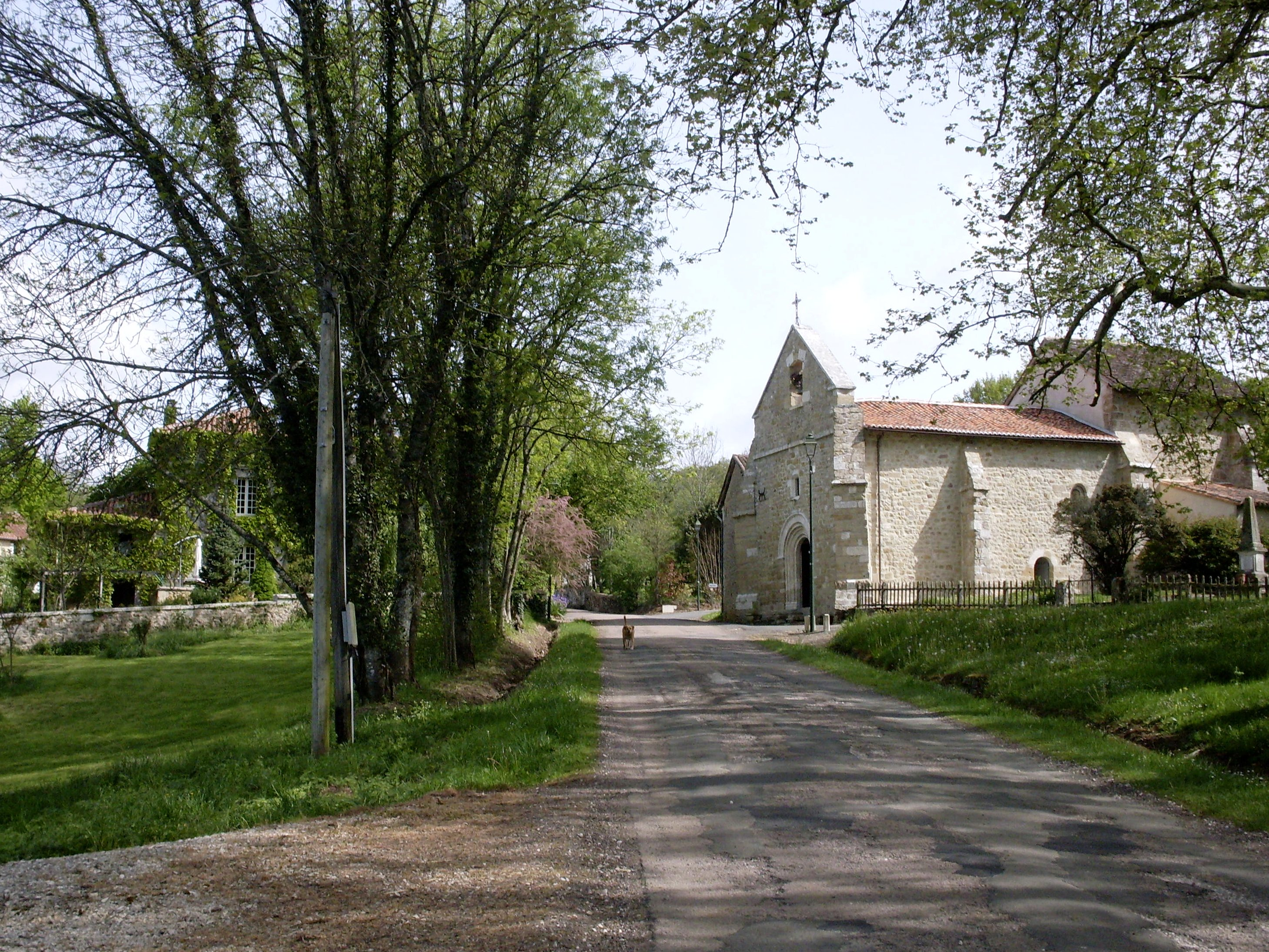
- The church and surroundings in Soudat
- Location of Soudat
- Location within France Location within Nouvelle-Aquitaine
- Coordinates: 45°37′31″N 0°33′56″E
- Country: France
- Region: Nouvelle-Aquitaine
- Department: Dordogne
- Arrondissement: Nontron
- Canton: Périgord Vert Nontronnais

Government
  - Mayor (2020–2026): Michelle Cantet
- Area^{1}: 8.82 km^{2} (3.41 sq mi)
- Elevation: 250 m (820 ft)
- Highest elevation: 266 m (873 ft)
- Lowest elevation: 134 m (440 ft)
- Population (2023): 102
  - Density: 11.6/km^{2} (30.0/sq mi)
- Time zone: UTC+01:00 (CET)
  - Summer (DST): UTC+02:00 (CEST)
- INSEE/Postal code: 24541 /24360
- ^{1} French Land Register data, which excludes lakes, ponds, glaciers > 1 km^{2} (0.386 sq mi or 247 acres) and river estuaries.

Soudat (French pronunciation: [suda]; Occitan: Sodac) is a commune in the Dordogne department in Nouvelle-Aquitaine in southwestern France.

== Population ==
Historical population
Year	Pop.	±% p.a.
1968	121	—
1975	98	−2.97%
1982	99	+0.15%
1990	78	−2.94%
1999	72	−0.89%
2007	83	+1.79%
2012	88	+1.18%
2017	92	+0.89%
2023	102	+1.73%
Source: INSEE

== See also ==
- Communes of the Dordogne département
