= Saint-Front-sur-Nizonne =

- Commune
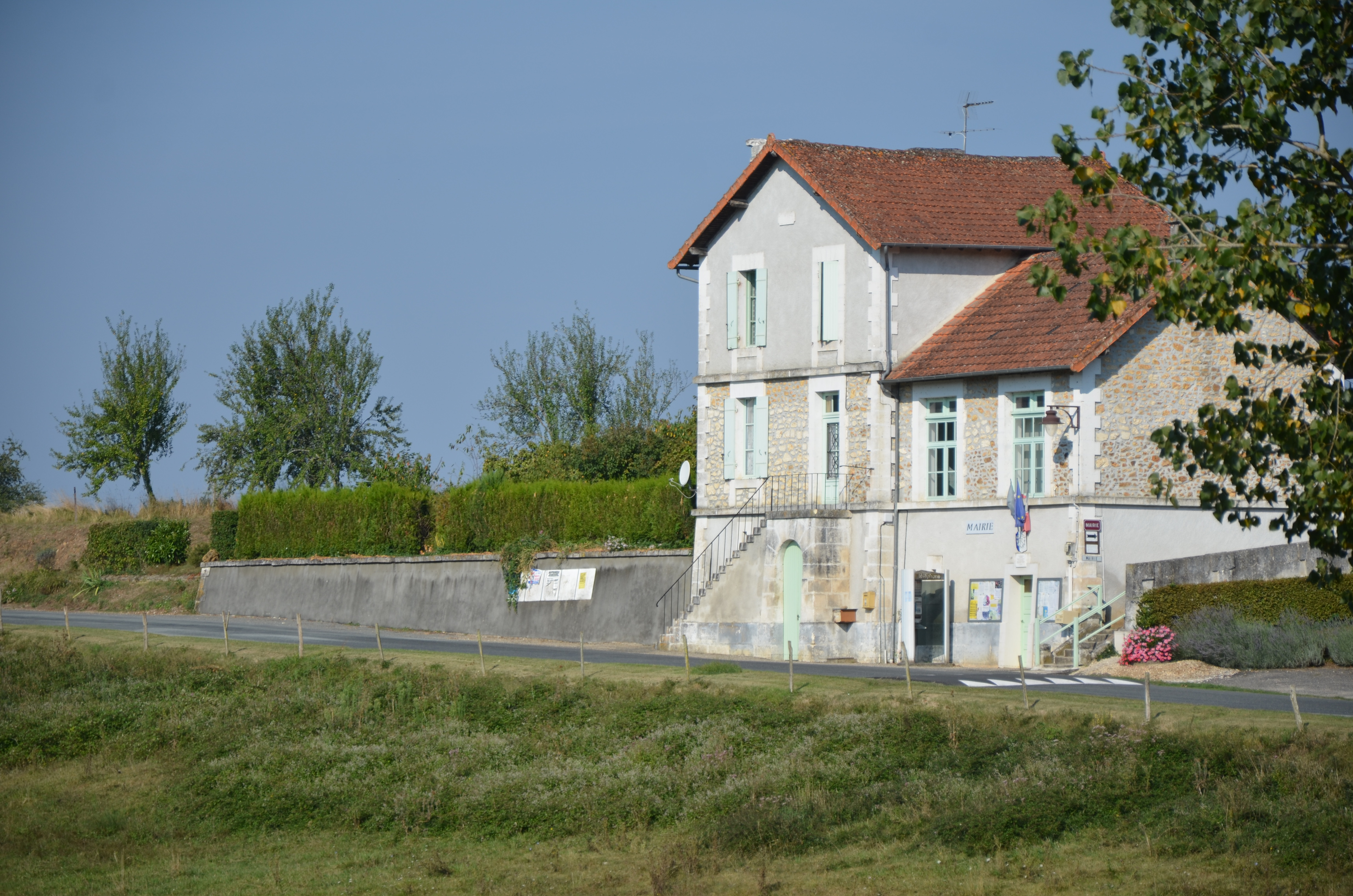
- The town hall in Saint-Front-sur-Nizonne
- Location of Saint-Front-sur-Nizonne
- Location within France Location within Nouvelle-Aquitaine
- Coordinates: 45°28′56″N 0°38′12″E
- Country: France
- Region: Nouvelle-Aquitaine
- Department: Dordogne
- Arrondissement: Nontron
- Canton: Périgord Vert Nontronnais

Government
  - Mayor (2022–2026): Gérard Chapeau
- Area^{1}: 13.05 km^{2} (5.04 sq mi)
- Highest elevation: 263 m (863 ft)
- Lowest elevation: 153 m (502 ft)
- Population (2023): 168
  - Density: 12.9/km^{2} (33.3/sq mi)
- Time zone: UTC+01:00 (CET)
  - Summer (DST): UTC+02:00 (CEST)
- INSEE/Postal code: 24411 /24300
- ^{1} French Land Register data, which excludes lakes, ponds, glaciers > 1 km^{2} (0.386 sq mi or 247 acres) and river estuaries.

Saint-Front-sur-Nizonne (French pronunciation: [sɛ̃ fʁɔ̃ syʁ nizɔn], literally Saint-Front on Nizonne; Occitan: Sent Front de Champs Niers) is a commune in the Dordogne department in Nouvelle-Aquitaine in southwestern France.

In 1912, the commune of Saint-Front-de-Champniers changed its name to Saint-Front-sur-Nizonne.

== Geography ==
The Lizonne, also called Nizonne, flows west through the middle of the commune.

== Population ==
Historical population
Year	Pop.	±% p.a.
1968	94	—
1975	95	+0.15%
1982	91	−0.61%
1990	122	+3.73%
1999	135	+1.13%
2007	138	+0.28%
2012	151	+1.82%
2017	157	+0.78%
2023	168	+1.14%
Source: INSEE

== See also ==
- Communes of the Dordogne department
