= Teyjat =

- Commune
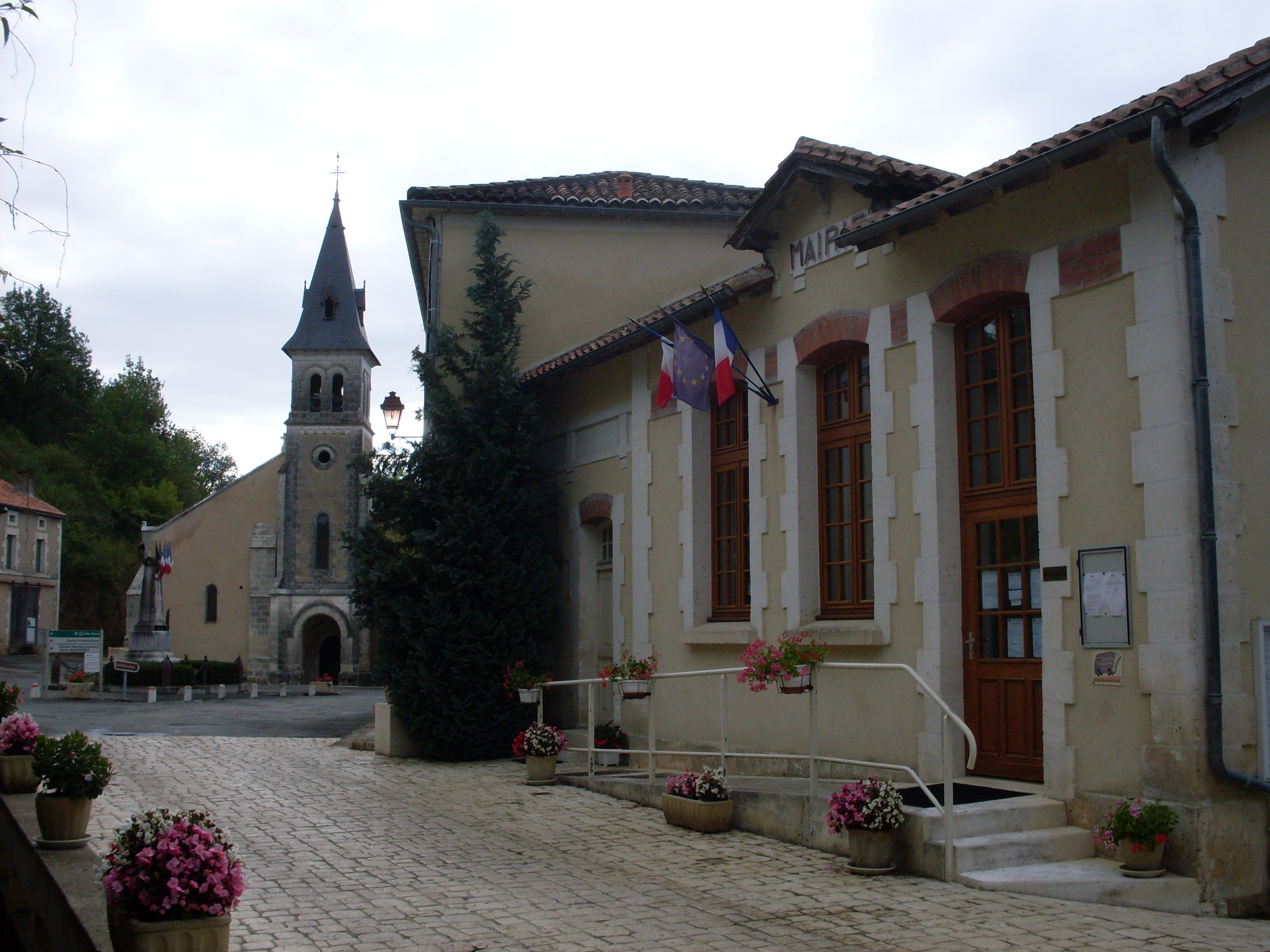
- The church and town hall in Teyjat
- Location of Teyjat
- Location within France Location within Nouvelle-Aquitaine
- Coordinates: 45°35′12″N 0°34′34″E
- Country: France
- Region: Nouvelle-Aquitaine
- Department: Dordogne
- Arrondissement: Nontron
- Canton: Périgord Vert Nontronnais
- Intercommunality: Périgord Nontronnais

Government
  - Mayor (2020–2026): Jean-Luc Maslard
- Area^{1}: 16.99 km^{2} (6.56 sq mi)
- Elevation: 122 m (400 ft)
- Highest elevation: 244 m (801 ft)
- Lowest elevation: 115 m (377 ft)
- Population (2023): 271
  - Density: 16.0/km^{2} (41.3/sq mi)
- Time zone: UTC+01:00 (CET)
  - Summer (DST): UTC+02:00 (CEST)
- INSEE/Postal code: 24548 /24300
- ^{1} French Land Register data, which excludes lakes, ponds, glaciers > 1 km^{2} (0.386 sq mi or 247 acres) and river estuaries.

Teyjat is a commune in the Dordogne department in Nouvelle-Aquitaine in southwestern France.

== Population ==
Historical population
| Year | Pop. | ±% p.a. |
|---|---|---|
| 1968 | 363 | — |
| 1975 | 372 | +0.35% |
| 1982 | 364 | −0.31% |
| 1990 | 309 | −2.03% |
| 1999 | 320 | +0.39% |
| 2007 | 269 | −2.15% |
| 2012 | 276 | +0.52% |
| 2017 | 275 | −0.07% |
| 2023 | 271 | −0.24% |
Source: INSEE

== Sights ==
A late Magdalenian decorated cave is located in the village.

== See also ==
- Communes of the Dordogne department
