= Augignac =

- Commune
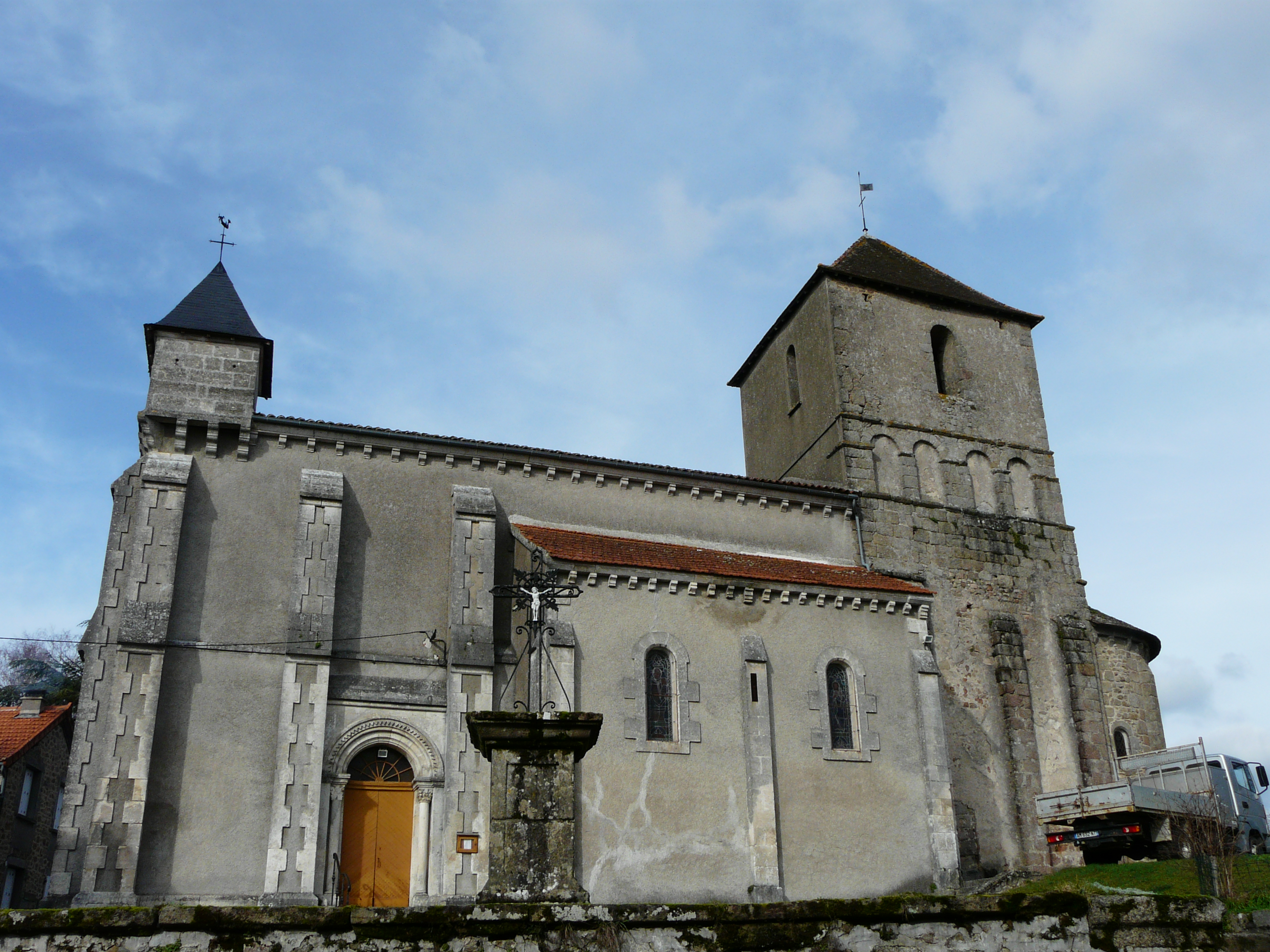
- The church in Augignac

- Coat of arms
- Location of Augignac
- Location within France Location within Nouvelle-Aquitaine
- Coordinates: 45°42′06″N 0°35′31″E
- Country: France
- Region: Nouvelle-Aquitaine
- Department: Dordogne
- Arrondissement: Nontron
- Canton: Périgord Vert Nontronnais
- Intercommunality: Périgord Nontronnais

Government
  - Mayor (2020–2026): Bernard Bazinet
- Area^{1}: 22.64 km^{2} (8.74 sq mi)
- Highest elevation: 306 m (1,004 ft)
- Lowest elevation: 189 m (620 ft)
- Population (2023): 820
  - Density: 36/km^{2} (94/sq mi)
- Time zone: UTC+01:00 (CET)
  - Summer (DST): UTC+02:00 (CEST)
- INSEE/Postal code: 24016 /24300
- ^{1} French Land Register data, which excludes lakes, ponds, glaciers > 1 km^{2} (0.386 sq mi or 247 acres) and river estuaries.

Augignac (French pronunciation: [oʒiɲak]; Occitan: Auginhac) is a commune in the Dordogne department in Nouvelle-Aquitaine in southwestern France.

Augignac is located between Nontron and Piégut-Pluviers in the heart of the Parc Naturel Régional de Périgord-Limousin

== Population ==
Historical population
Year	Pop.	±% p.a.
1968	876	—
1975	791	−1.45%
1982	818	+0.48%
1990	838	+0.30%
1999	791	−0.64%
2007	821	+0.47%
2012	838	+0.41%
2017	814	−0.58%
2023	820	+0.12%
Source: INSEE

== See also ==
- Communes of the Dordogne department
