= Connezac =

- Commune
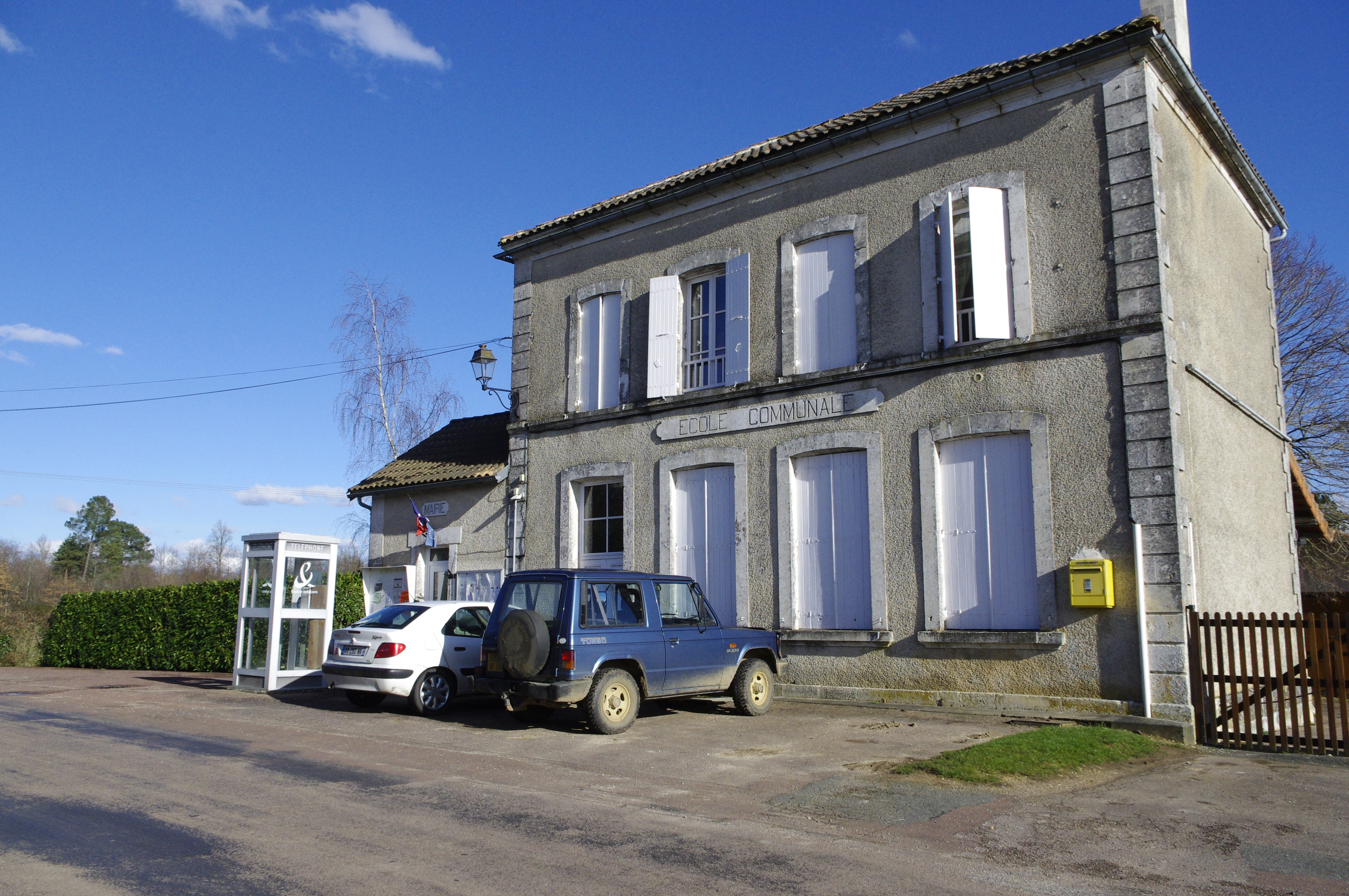
- The town hall in Connezac
- Location of Connezac
- Location within France Location within Nouvelle-Aquitaine
- Coordinates: 45°30′40″N 0°31′41″E
- Country: France
- Region: Nouvelle-Aquitaine
- Department: Dordogne
- Arrondissement: Nontron
- Canton: Périgord Vert Nontronnais
- Intercommunality: Périgord Nontronnais

Government
  - Mayor (2020–2026): Thierry Pasquet
- Area^{1}: 5.78 km^{2} (2.23 sq mi)
- Highest elevation: 209 m (686 ft)
- Lowest elevation: 118 m (387 ft)
- Population (2023): 79
  - Density: 14/km^{2} (35/sq mi)
- Time zone: UTC+01:00 (CET)
  - Summer (DST): UTC+02:00 (CEST)
- INSEE/Postal code: 24131 /24300
- ^{1} French Land Register data, which excludes lakes, ponds, glaciers > 1 km^{2} (0.386 sq mi or 247 acres) and river estuaries.

Connezac (French pronunciation: [kɔnzak]; Occitan: Conasac) is a commune in the Dordogne department in Nouvelle-Aquitaine in southwestern France. The commune consists of 5 hamlets: Connezac (where the church and the castle are located), Maine Rousset (where the town hall is located), Fontenille, Lafarge and Maine du Bost.

== Population ==
Historical population
Year	Pop.	±% p.a.
1968	111	—
1975	103	−1.06%
1982	91	−1.75%
1990	56	−5.89%
1999	82	+4.33%
2007	82	+0.00%
2012	79	−0.74%
2017	74	−1.30%
2023	79	+1.10%
Source: INSEE

== Monuments ==
- Castle of Connezac (16th and 17th century)
- Parish church Saint Martin, former chapel of the castle.
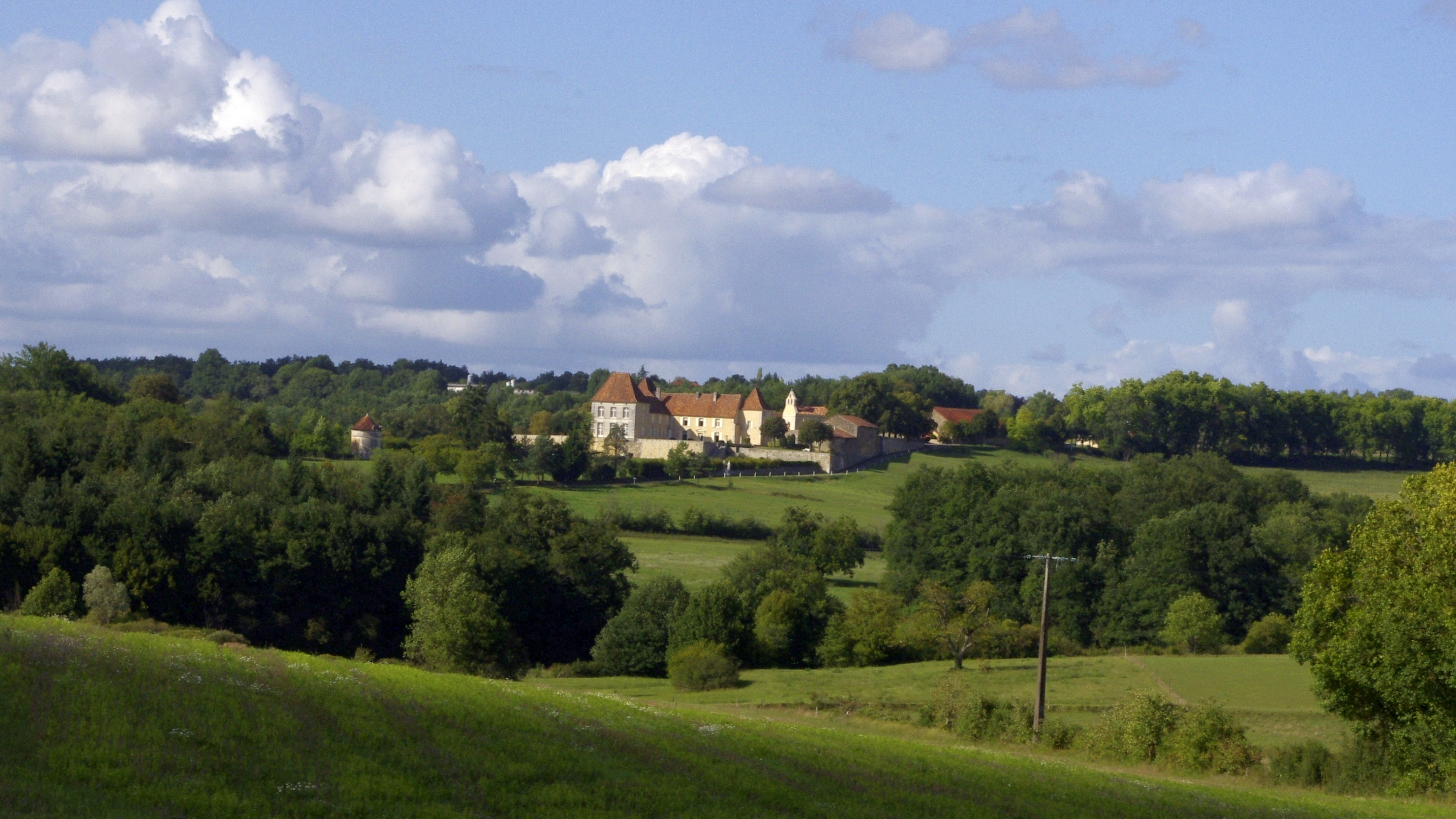
Looking from Connezac to Belussière castle

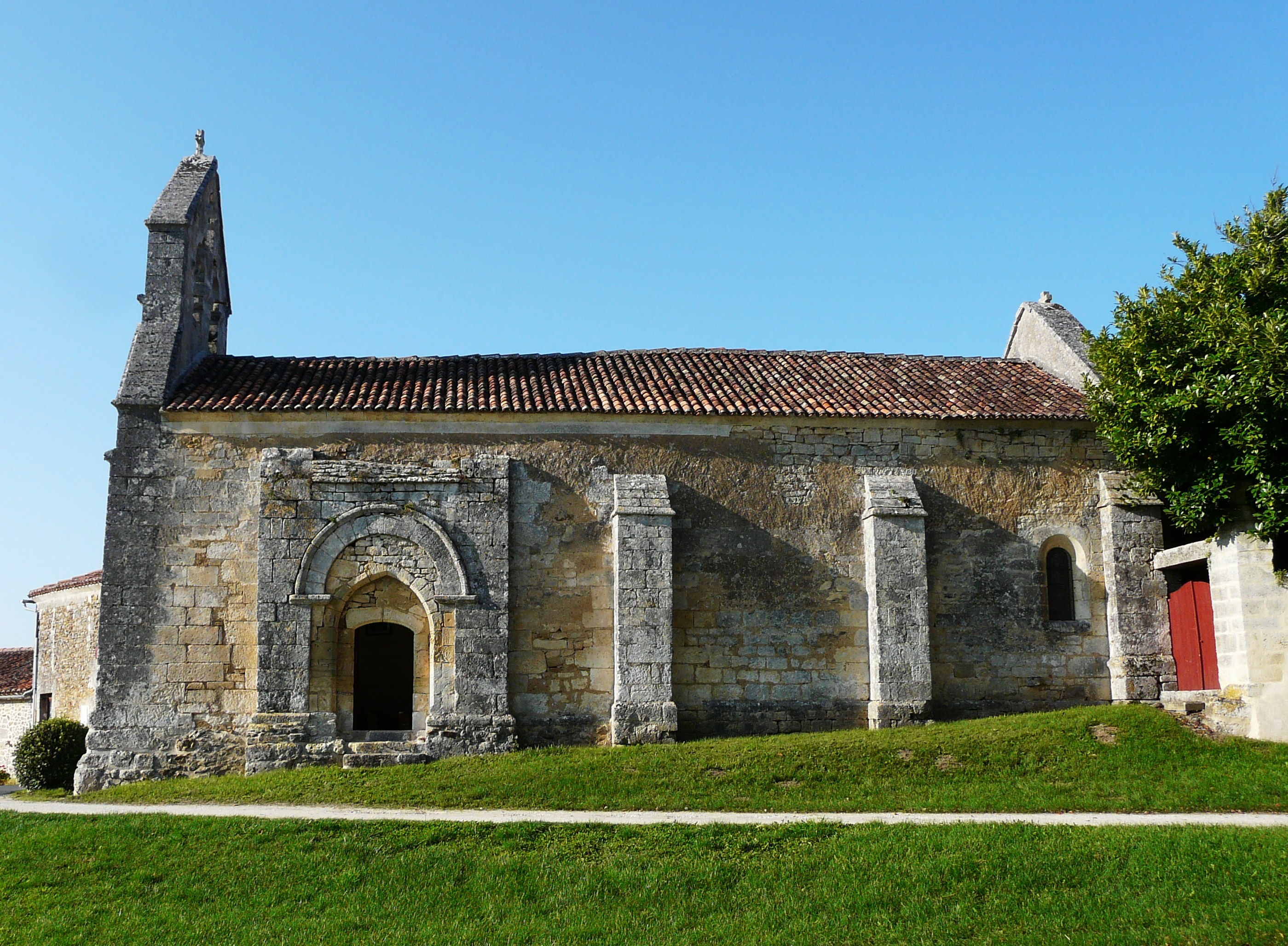
Church

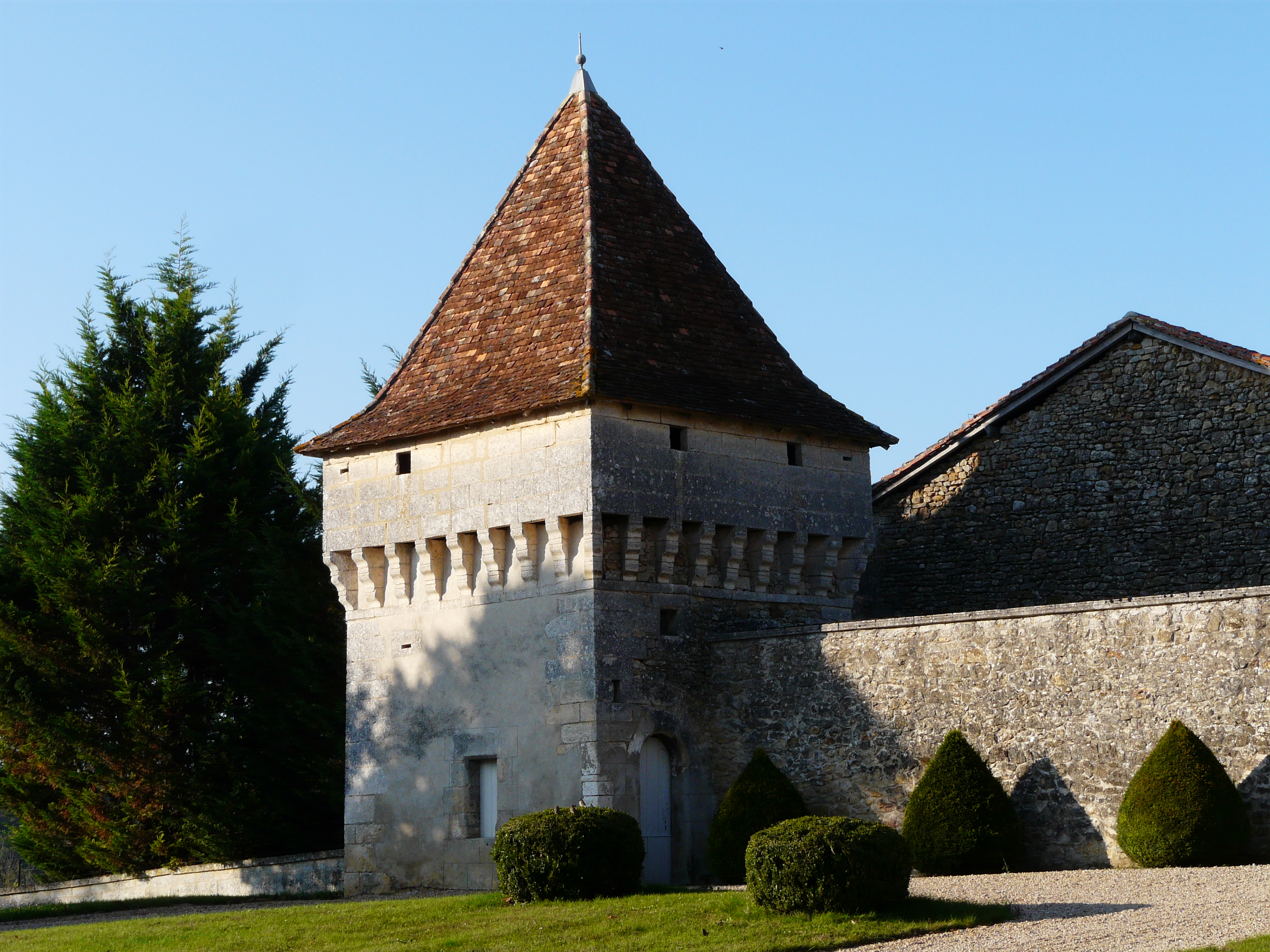
Connezac château

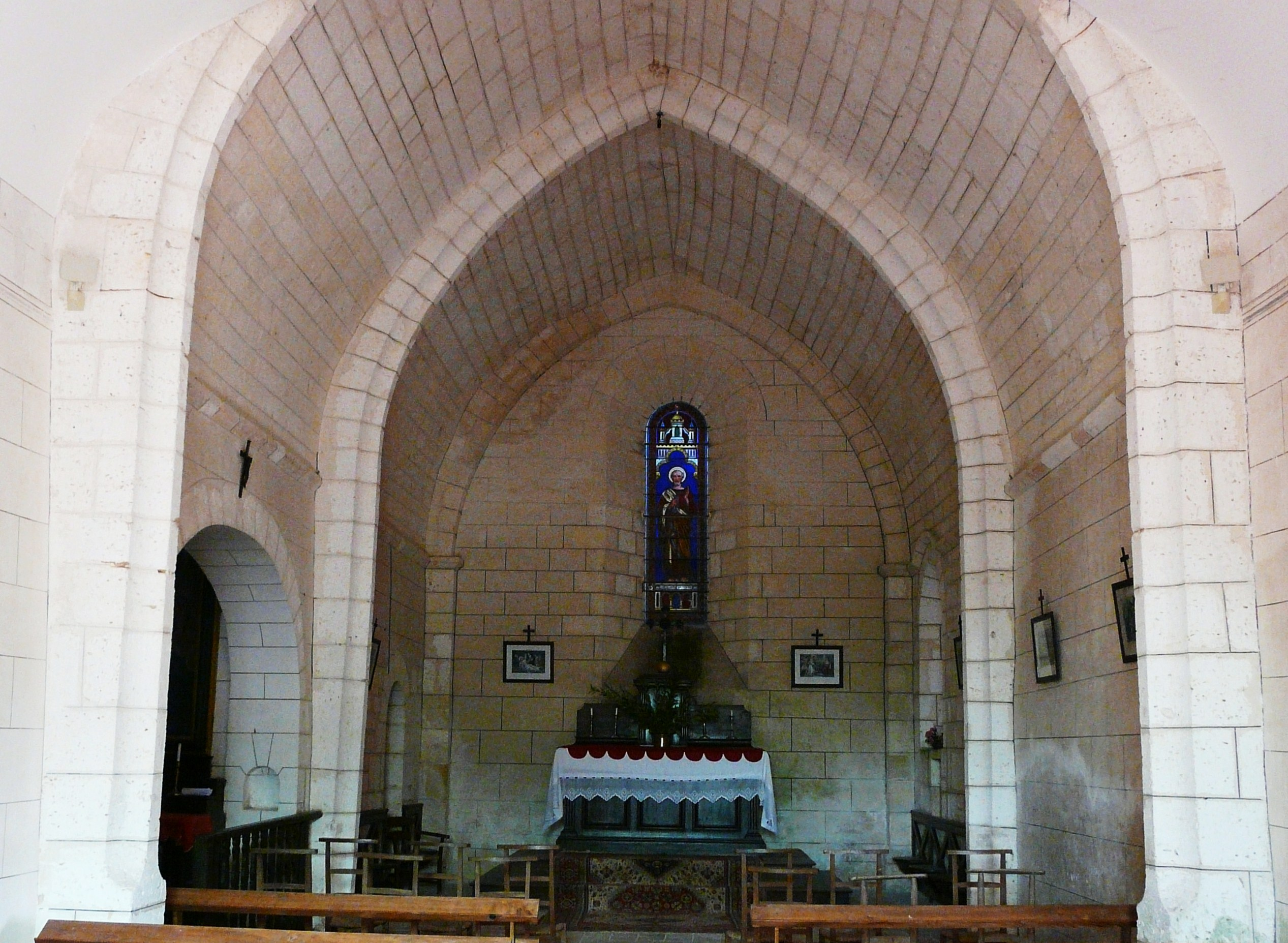
St Martins nave

== See also ==
- Communes of the Dordogne department
