= Saint-Saud-Lacoussière =

- Commune
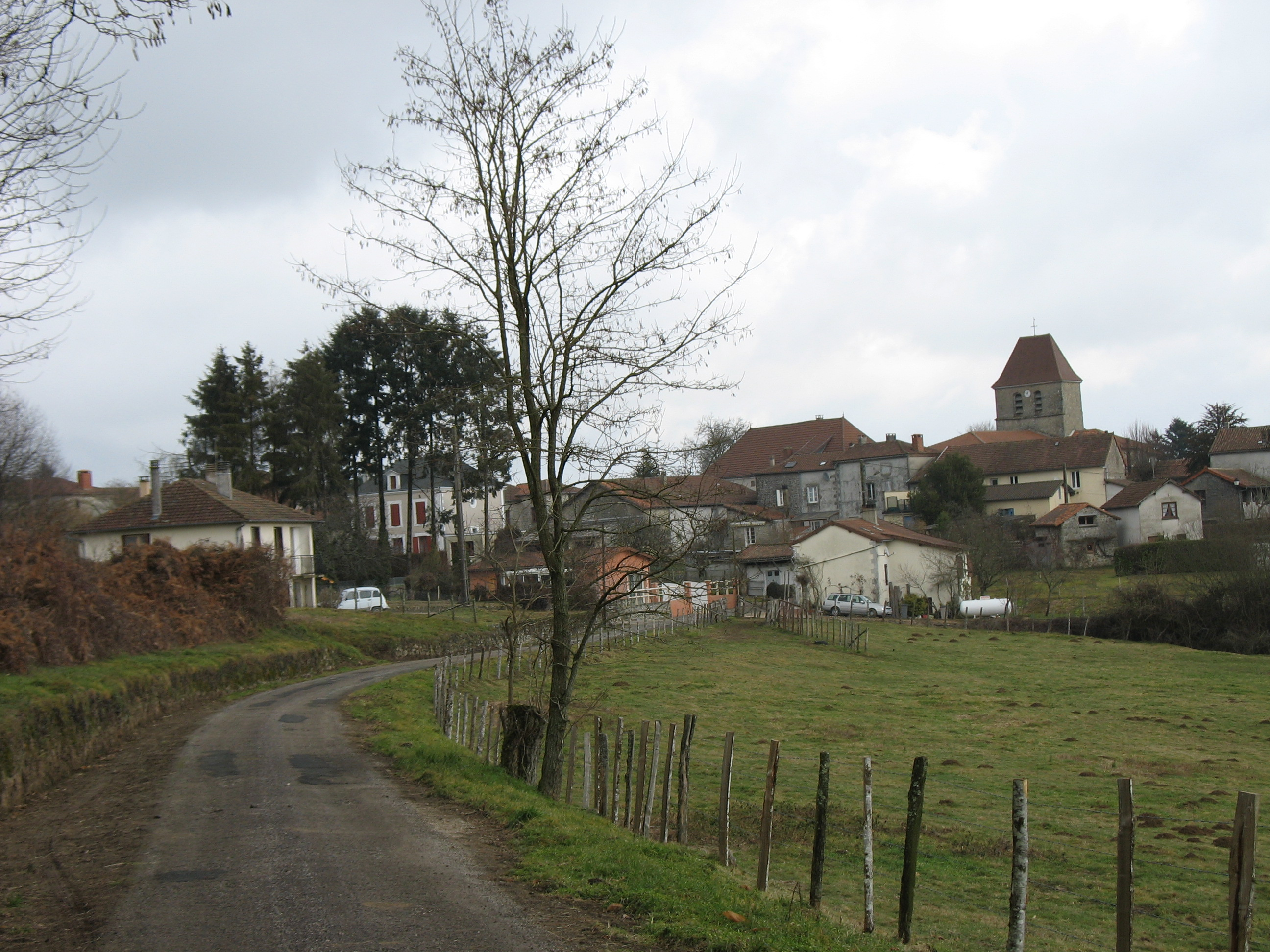
- A general view of Saint-Saud-Lacoussière
- Location of Saint-Saud-Lacoussière
- Location within France Location within Nouvelle-Aquitaine
- Coordinates: 45°32′39″N 0°49′11″E
- Country: France
- Region: Nouvelle-Aquitaine
- Department: Dordogne
- Arrondissement: Nontron
- Canton: Périgord Vert Nontronnais

Government
  - Mayor (2020–2026): Pierre Duval
- Area^{1}: 58.04 km^{2} (22.41 sq mi)
- Elevation: 295 m (968 ft)
- Highest elevation: 370 m (1,210 ft)
- Lowest elevation: 189 m (620 ft)
- Population (2023): 820
  - Density: 14/km^{2} (37/sq mi)
- Time zone: UTC+01:00 (CET)
  - Summer (DST): UTC+02:00 (CEST)
- INSEE/Postal code: 24498 /24470
- ^{1} French Land Register data, which excludes lakes, ponds, glaciers > 1 km^{2} (0.386 sq mi or 247 acres) and river estuaries.

Saint-Saud-Lacoussière (French pronunciation: [sɛ̃ so lakusjɛʁ]; Occitan: Sensaut e La Cossiera) is a commune in the Dordogne department in Nouvelle-Aquitaine in southwestern France.

== Population ==
Historical population
Year	Pop.	±% p.a.
1968	1,284	—
1975	1,148	−1.59%
1982	1,045	−1.33%
1990	951	−1.17%
1999	868	−1.01%
2007	856	−0.17%
2012	867	+0.26%
2017	832	−0.82%
2023	820	−0.24%
Source: INSEE

== See also ==
- Communes of the Dordogne department
