= Canton of Périgord Vert Nontronnais =

Coordinates: 45.53°N 0.66°E

The canton of Périgord Vert Nontronnais is an administrative division of the Dordogne department, southwestern France. It was created at the French canton reorganisation which came into effect in March 2015. Its seat is in Nontron.

It consists of the following communes:

1. Abjat-sur-Bandiat
2. Augignac
3. Le Bourdeix
4. Busserolles
5. Bussière-Badil
6. Champniers-et-Reilhac
7. Champs-Romain
8. Connezac
9. Étouars
10. Hautefaye
11. Javerlhac-et-la-Chapelle-Saint-Robert
12. Lussas-et-Nontronneau
13. Milhac-de-Nontron
14. Nontron
15. Piégut-Pluviers
16. Saint-Barthélemy-de-Bussière
17. Saint-Estèphe
18. Saint-Front-la-Rivière
19. Saint-Front-sur-Nizonne
20. Saint-Martial-de-Valette
21. Saint-Martin-le-Pin
22. Saint-Pardoux-la-Rivière
23. Saint-Saud-Lacoussière
24. Savignac-de-Nontron
25. Sceau-Saint-Angel
26. Soudat
27. Teyjat
28. Varaignes
