= Milhac-de-Nontron =

- Commune
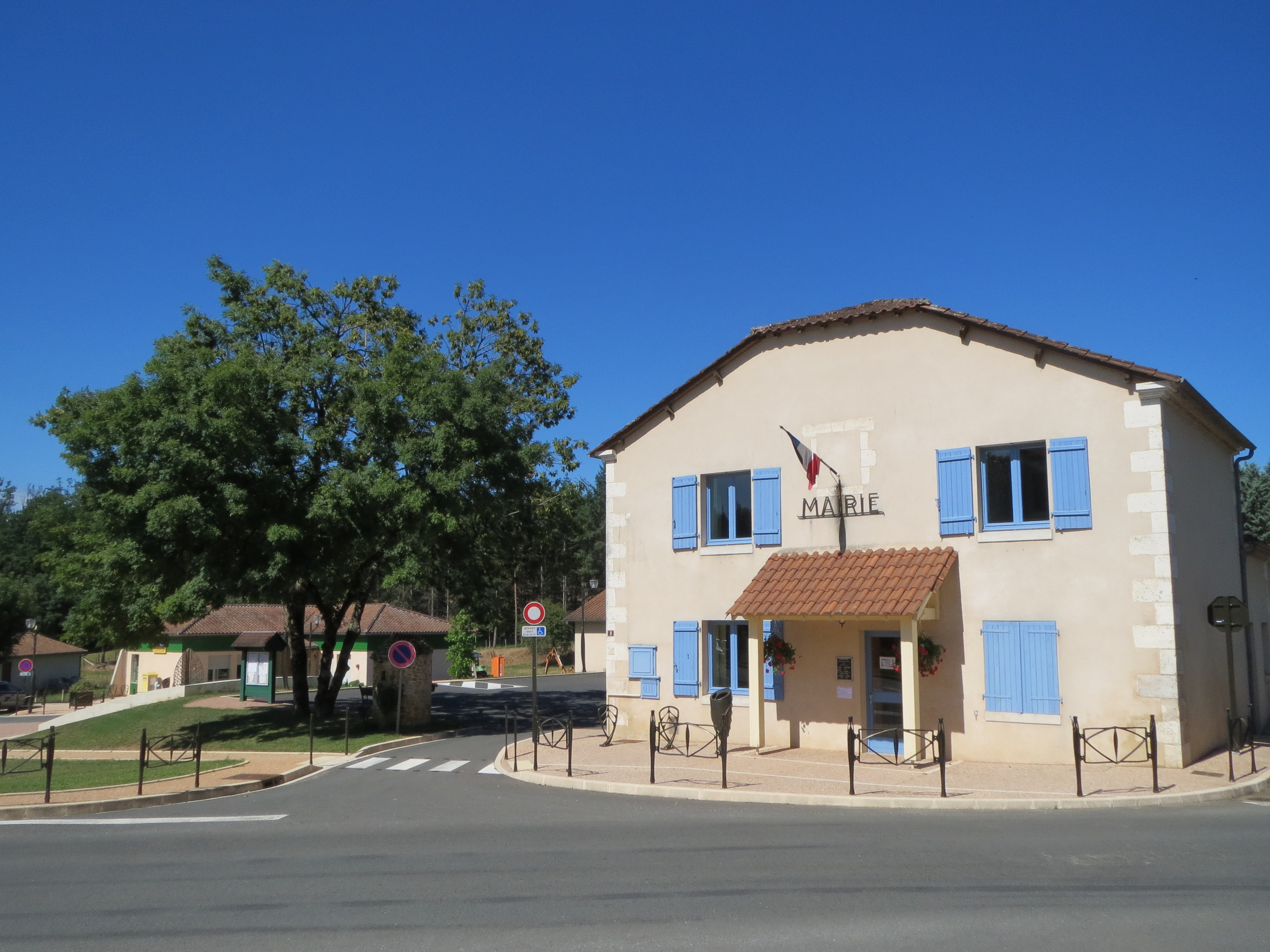
- The town hall in Milhac-de-Nontron
- Location of Milhac-de-Nontron
- Location within France Location within Nouvelle-Aquitaine
- Coordinates: 45°28′06″N 0°46′53″E
- Country: France
- Region: Nouvelle-Aquitaine
- Department: Dordogne
- Arrondissement: Nontron
- Canton: Périgord Vert Nontronnais

Government
  - Mayor (2020–2026): Pascal Mechineau
- Area^{1}: 34.75 km^{2} (13.42 sq mi)
- Elevation: 180 m (590 ft)
- Highest elevation: 331 m (1,086 ft)
- Lowest elevation: 151 m (495 ft)
- Population (2023): 520
  - Density: 15/km^{2} (39/sq mi)
- Time zone: UTC+01:00 (CET)
  - Summer (DST): UTC+02:00 (CEST)
- INSEE/Postal code: 24271 /24470
- ^{1} French Land Register data, which excludes lakes, ponds, glaciers > 1 km^{2} (0.386 sq mi or 247 acres) and river estuaries.

Milhac-de-Nontron (French pronunciation: [mijak də nɔ̃tʁɔ̃], literally Milhac of Nontron; Occitan: Milhac de Nontronh) is a commune in the Dordogne department in Nouvelle-Aquitaine in southwestern France.

== Population ==
Historical population
Year	Pop.	±% p.a.
1968	740	—
1975	702	−0.75%
1982	636	−1.40%
1990	573	−1.30%
1999	611	+0.72%
2007	602	−0.19%
2012	558	−1.51%
2017	505	−1.98%
2023	520	+0.49%
Source: INSEE

== See also ==
- Communes of the Dordogne department
