= Champs-Romain =

- Commune
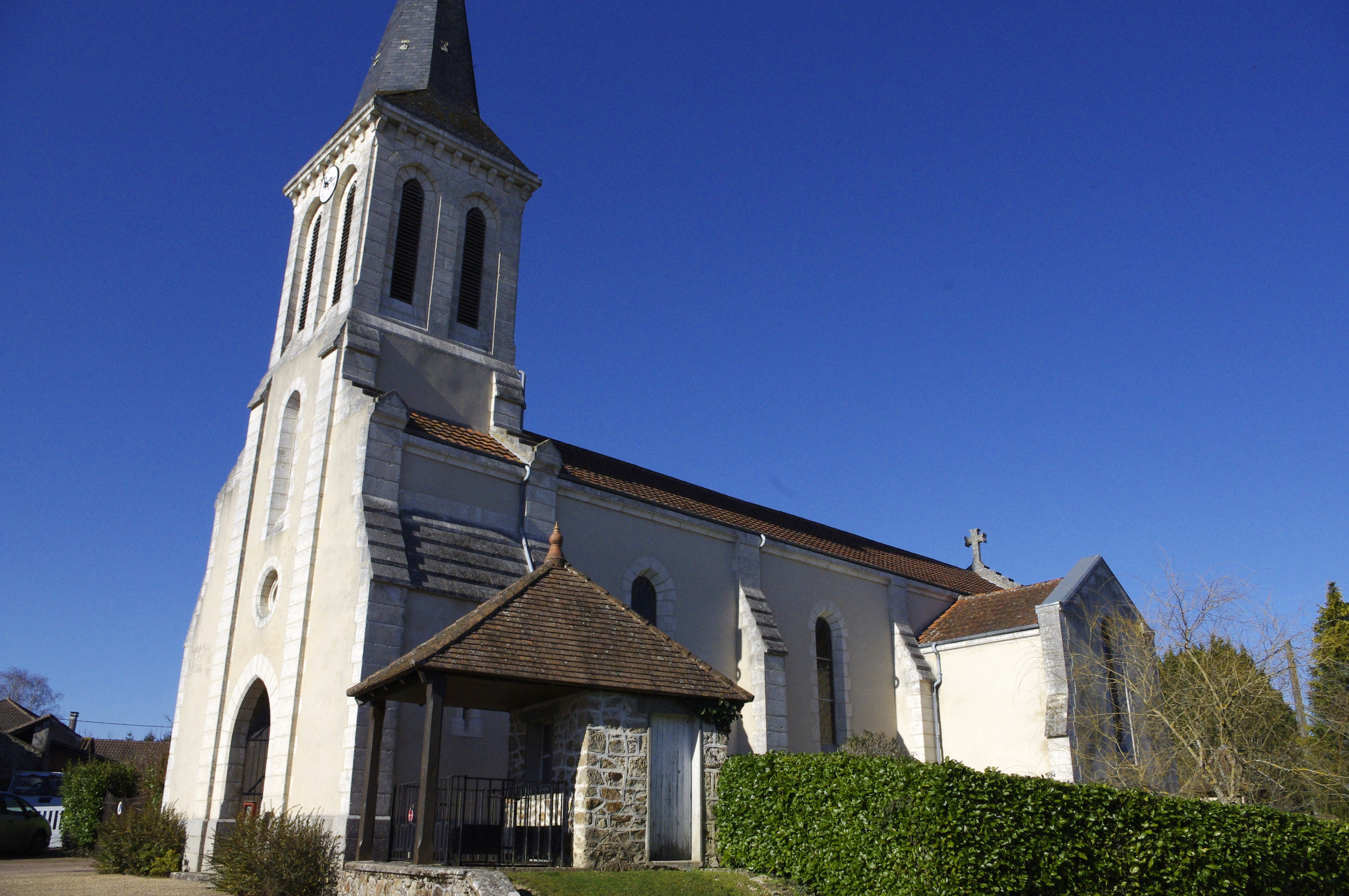
- The church in Champs-Romain
- Location of Champs-Romain
- Location within France Location within Nouvelle-Aquitaine
- Coordinates: 45°31′55″N 0°46′34″E
- Country: France
- Region: Nouvelle-Aquitaine
- Department: Dordogne
- Arrondissement: Nontron
- Canton: Périgord Vert Nontronnais

Government
  - Mayor (2020–2026): Serge Viroulet
- Area^{1}: 20.33 km^{2} (7.85 sq mi)
- Elevation: 304 m (997 ft)
- Highest elevation: 344 m (1,129 ft)
- Lowest elevation: 155 m (509 ft)
- Population (2023): 291
  - Density: 14.3/km^{2} (37.1/sq mi)
- Time zone: UTC+01:00 (CET)
  - Summer (DST): UTC+02:00 (CEST)
- INSEE/Postal code: 24101 /24470
- ^{1} French Land Register data, which excludes lakes, ponds, glaciers > 1 km^{2} (0.386 sq mi or 247 acres) and river estuaries.

Champs-Romain (French pronunciation: [ʃɑ̃ ʁɔmɛ̃]; Occitan: Los Champs e Romenh) is a commune in the Dordogne department in Nouvelle-Aquitaine in southwestern France.

== Population ==
Historical population
Year	Pop.	±% p.a.
1968	410	—
1975	373	−1.34%
1982	332	−1.65%
1990	331	−0.04%
1999	328	−0.10%
2007	317	−0.43%
2012	308	−0.57%
2017	286	−1.47%
2023	291	+0.29%
Source: INSEE

== See also ==
- Communes of the Dordogne department
