= Abjat-sur-Bandiat =

- Commune
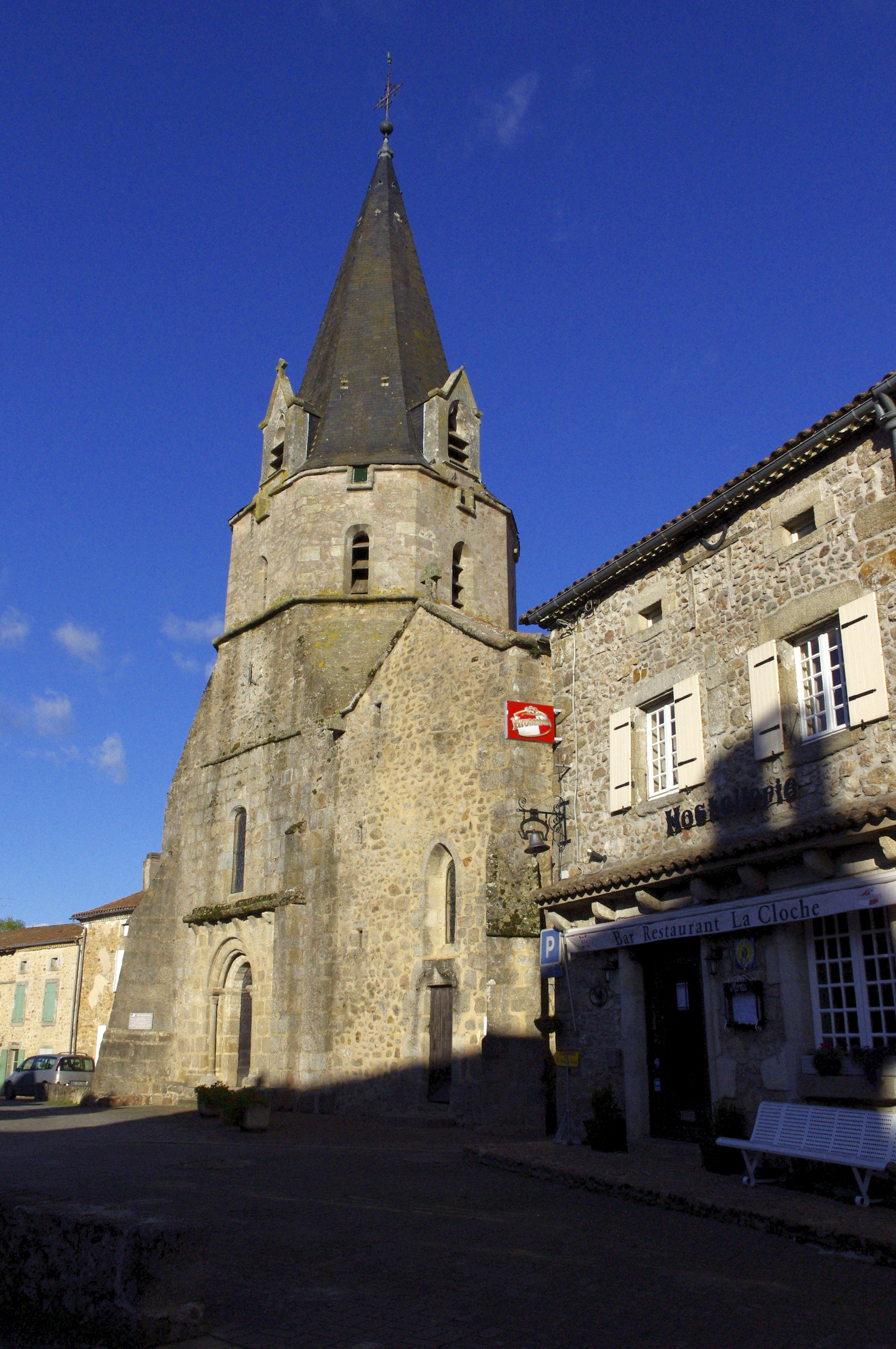
- The church in Abjat-sur-Bandiat

- Coat of arms
- Location of Abjat-sur-Bandiat
- Location within France Location within Nouvelle-Aquitaine
- Coordinates: 45°35′09″N 0°45′32″E
- Country: France
- Region: Nouvelle-Aquitaine
- Department: Dordogne
- Arrondissement: Nontron
- Canton: Périgord Vert Nontronnais
- Intercommunality: Périgord Nontronnais

Government
  - Mayor (2024–2026): Fabrice Chateau
- Area^{1}: 27.62 km^{2} (10.66 sq mi)
- Highest elevation: 355 m (1,165 ft)
- Lowest elevation: 196 m (643 ft)
- Population (2023): 639
  - Density: 23.1/km^{2} (59.9/sq mi)
- Demonym(s): Abjacois, Abjacoises
- Time zone: UTC+01:00 (CET)
  - Summer (DST): UTC+02:00 (CEST)
- INSEE/Postal code: 24001 /24300
- ^{1} French Land Register data, which excludes lakes, ponds, glaciers > 1 km^{2} (0.386 sq mi or 247 acres) and river estuaries.

Abjat-sur-Bandiat (French pronunciation: [abʒa syʁ bɑ̃dja], literally Abjat on Bandiat; Occitan: Ajac de Bandiat) is a commune in the Dordogne department in Nouvelle-Aquitaine in southwestern France. The commune was simply known as Abjat until 1975.

== Population ==
Historical population

Year	Pop.	±% p.a.
1793	1,233	—
1800	1,376	+1.58%
1806	1,256	−1.51%
1821	1,600	+1.63%
1831	1,642	+0.26%
1836	1,591	−0.63%
1841	1,621	+0.37%
1846	1,679	+0.71%
1851	1,645	−0.41%
1856	1,678	+0.40%
1861	1,602	−0.92%
1866	1,623	+0.26%
1872	1,548	−0.79%
1876	1,630	+1.30%
1881	1,713	+1.00%
1886	1,703	−0.12%
1891	1,716	+0.15%
1896	1,685	−0.36%
1901	1,689	+0.05%

Year	Pop.	±% p.a.
1906	1,701	+0.14%
1911	1,650	−0.61%
1921	1,438	−1.37%
1926	1,368	−0.99%
1931	1,194	−2.68%
1936	1,207	+0.22%
1946	1,179	−0.23%
1954	957	−2.57%
1962	949	−0.10%
1968	837	−2.07%
1975	716	−2.21%
1982	687	−0.59%
1990	693	+0.11%
1999	624	−1.16%
2007	649	+0.49%
2012	661	+0.37%
2017	620	−1.27%
2023	639	+0.50%

Source: EHESS (1793-1999) and INSEE

== Sport ==
Every year, since 1991, the French conkers championship is held in the village.

== See also ==
- Communes of the Dordogne département
