= Saint-Estèphe, Dordogne =

Saint-Estèphe
- Commune
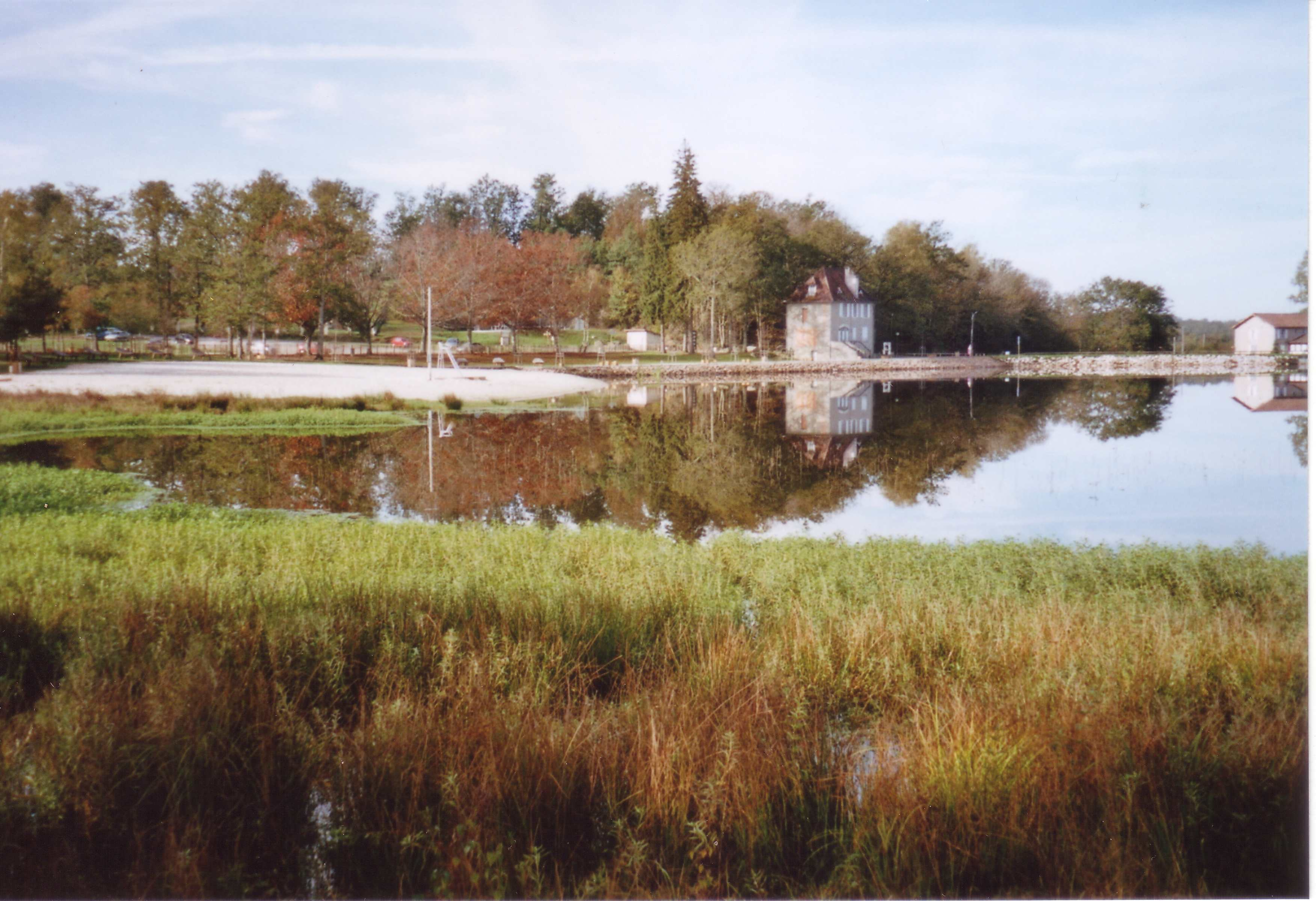
- The lake in Saint-Estèphe

- Coat of arms
- Location of Saint-Estèphe
- Location within France Location within Nouvelle-Aquitaine
- Coordinates: 45°35′33″N 0°39′48″E
- Country: France
- Region: Nouvelle-Aquitaine
- Department: Dordogne
- Arrondissement: Nontron
- Canton: Périgord Vert Nontronnais

Government
  - Mayor (2020–2026): Eric Forgeneuf
- Area^{1}: 21.37 km^{2} (8.25 sq mi)
- Highest elevation: 300 m (980 ft)
- Lowest elevation: 177 m (581 ft)
- Population (2023): 583
  - Density: 27.3/km^{2} (70.7/sq mi)
- Time zone: UTC+01:00 (CET)
  - Summer (DST): UTC+02:00 (CEST)
- INSEE/Postal code: 24398 /24360
- ^{1} French Land Register data, which excludes lakes, ponds, glaciers > 1 km^{2} (0.386 sq mi or 247 acres) and river estuaries.

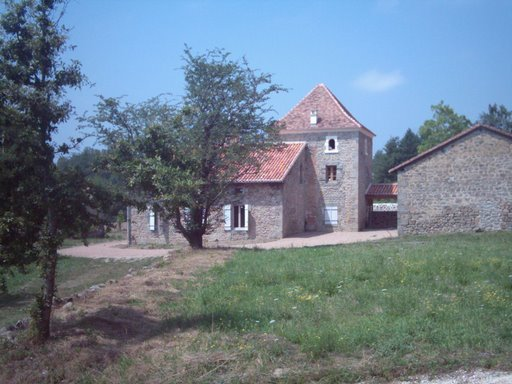
House in Le Briaudet at Saint Estephe

Saint-Estèphe (French pronunciation: [sɛ̃.t‿ɛstɛf]; Limousin: Sent Estefe) is a commune in the Dordogne department in Nouvelle-Aquitaine in southwestern France.

== Population ==
Historical population
Year	Pop.	±% p.a.
1968	643	—
1975	621	−0.50%
1982	612	−0.21%
1990	604	−0.16%
1999	619	+0.27%
2007	599	−0.41%
2012	592	−0.23%
2017	613	+0.70%
2023	583	−0.83%
Source: INSEE

== See also ==
- Communes of the Dordogne department
