= Le Bourdeix =

- Commune
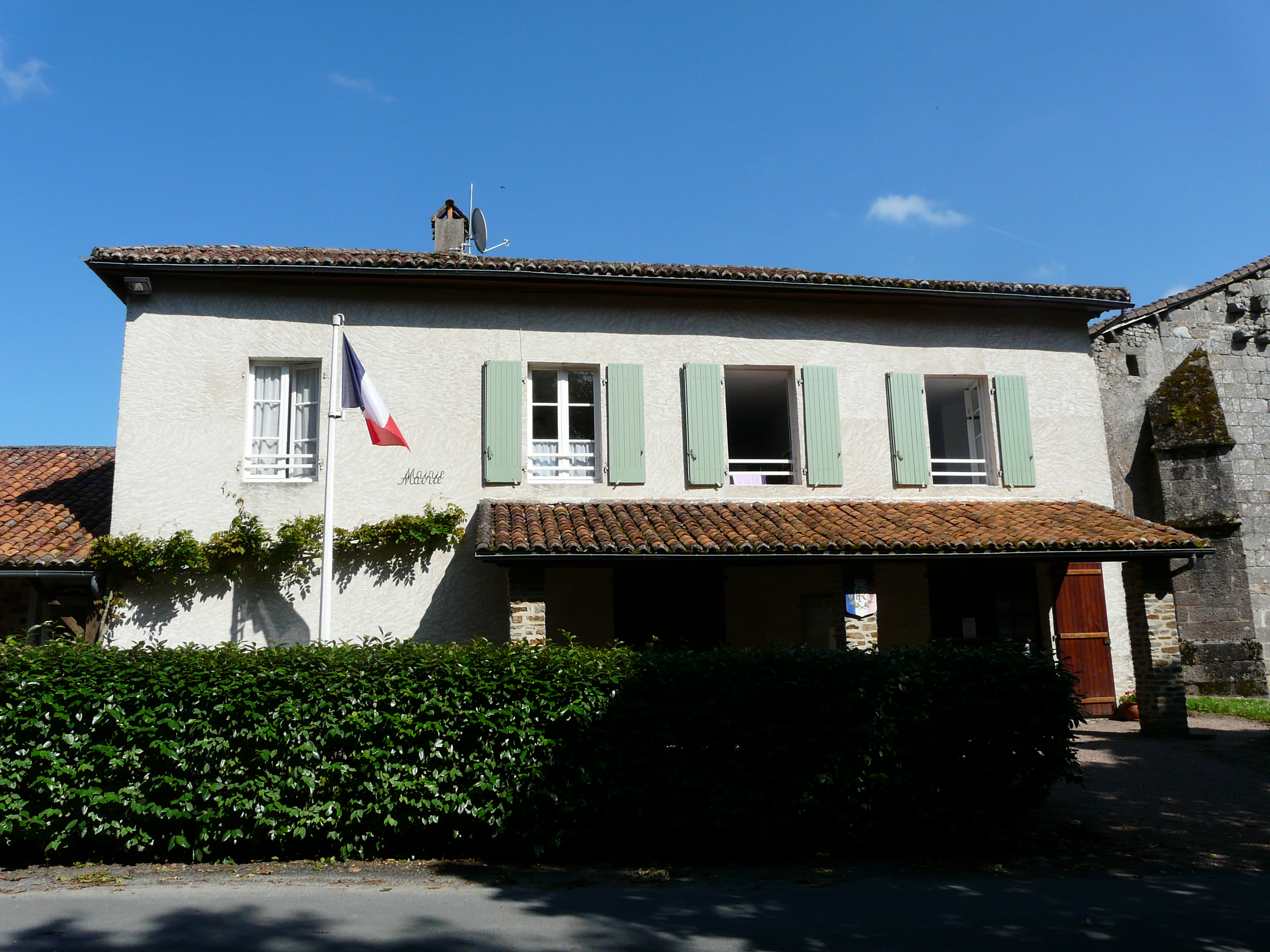
- The town hall in Le Bourdeix
- Location of Le Bourdeix
- Location within France Location within Nouvelle-Aquitaine
- Coordinates: 45°35′21″N 0°37′58″E
- Country: France
- Region: Nouvelle-Aquitaine
- Department: Dordogne
- Arrondissement: Nontron
- Canton: Périgord Vert Nontronnais
- Intercommunality: Périgord nontronnais

Government
  - Mayor (2020–2026): Maurice Chabrol
- Area^{1}: 11.69 km^{2} (4.51 sq mi)
- Highest elevation: 275 m (902 ft)
- Lowest elevation: 141 m (463 ft)
- Population (2023): 246
  - Density: 21.0/km^{2} (54.5/sq mi)
- Time zone: UTC+01:00 (CET)
  - Summer (DST): UTC+02:00 (CEST)
- INSEE/Postal code: 24056 /24300
- ^{1} French Land Register data, which excludes lakes, ponds, glaciers > 1 km^{2} (0.386 sq mi or 247 acres) and river estuaries.

Le Bourdeix (French pronunciation: [lə buʁde]; Occitan: Lu Bordelh) [ly buɾˈdej]) is a commune in the Dordogne department in southwestern France.

== Population ==
Historical population
Year	Pop.	±% p.a.
1968	254	—
1975	207	−2.88%
1982	212	+0.34%
1990	230	+1.02%
1999	229	−0.05%
2007	254	+1.30%
2012	240	−1.13%
2017	226	−1.19%
2023	246	+1.42%
Source: INSEE

== See also ==
- Communes of the Dordogne département
