= Sceau-Saint-Angel =

- Commune
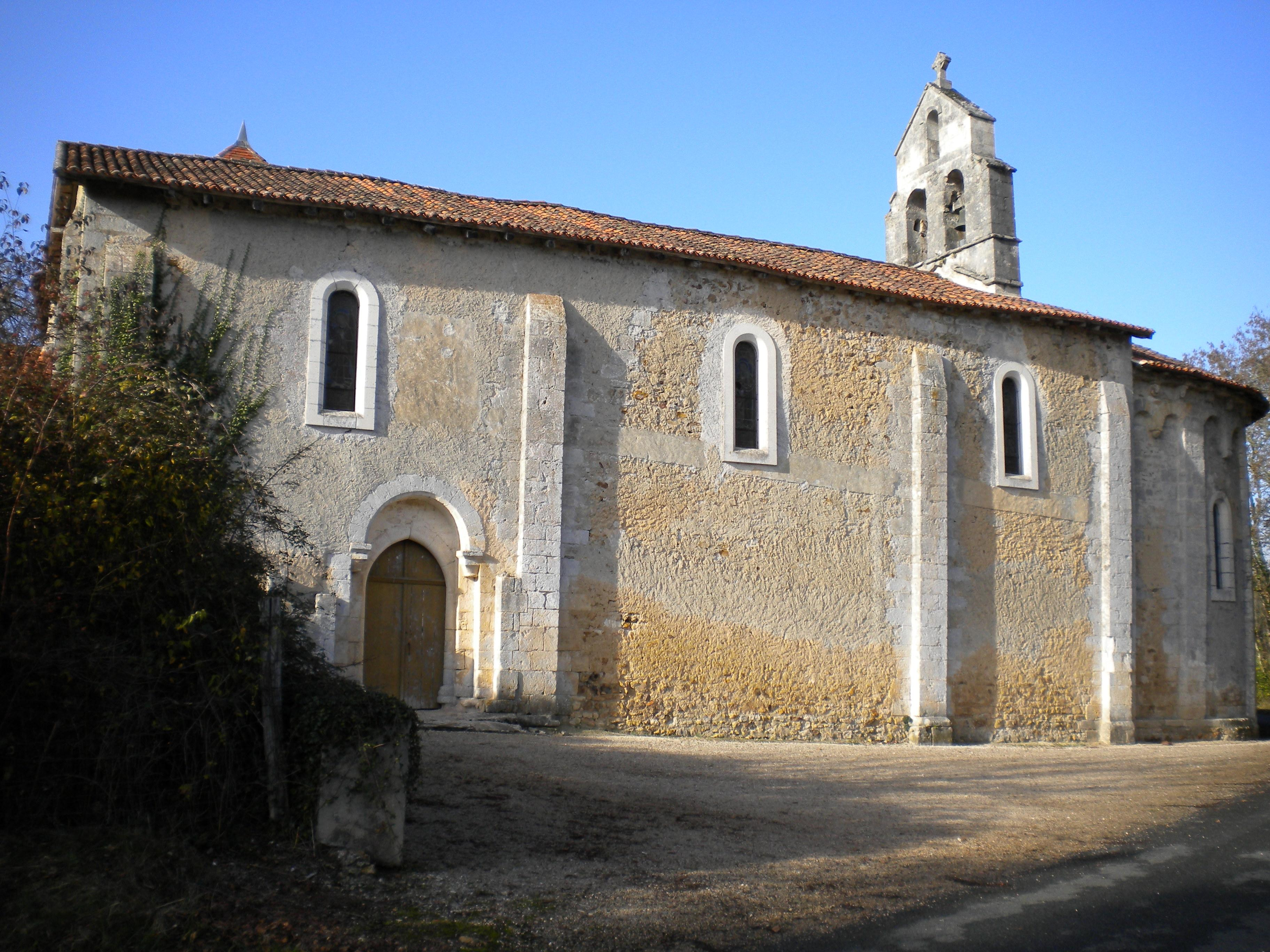
- The church in Saint-Angel
- Location of Sceau-Saint-Angel
- Location within France Location within Nouvelle-Aquitaine
- Coordinates: 45°29′02″N 0°41′45″E
- Country: France
- Region: Nouvelle-Aquitaine
- Department: Dordogne
- Arrondissement: Nontron
- Canton: Périgord Vert Nontronnais

Government
  - Mayor (2020–2026): Michel Combeau
- Area^{1}: 17.49 km^{2} (6.75 sq mi)
- Elevation: 220 m (720 ft)
- Highest elevation: 262 m (860 ft)
- Lowest elevation: 157 m (515 ft)
- Population (2023): 125
  - Density: 7.15/km^{2} (18.5/sq mi)
- Time zone: UTC+01:00 (CET)
  - Summer (DST): UTC+02:00 (CEST)
- INSEE/Postal code: 24528 /24300
- ^{1} French Land Register data, which excludes lakes, ponds, glaciers > 1 km^{2} (0.386 sq mi or 247 acres) and river estuaries.

Sceau-Saint-Angel (French pronunciation: [so sɛ̃.t‿ɑ̃ʒɛl]; Occitan: Vers Ceus Sent Angeu) is a commune in the Dordogne department in Nouvelle-Aquitaine in southwestern France.

== Geography ==
The Lizonne has its source in the commune.

== Population ==
Historical population
Year	Pop.	±% p.a.
1968	192	—
1975	149	−3.56%
1982	129	−2.04%
1990	122	−0.69%
1999	117	−0.46%
2007	121	+0.42%
2012	125	+0.65%
2017	124	−0.16%
2023	125	+0.13%
Source: INSEE

== See also ==
- Communes of the Dordogne département
