= Saint-Martial-de-Valette =

- Commune
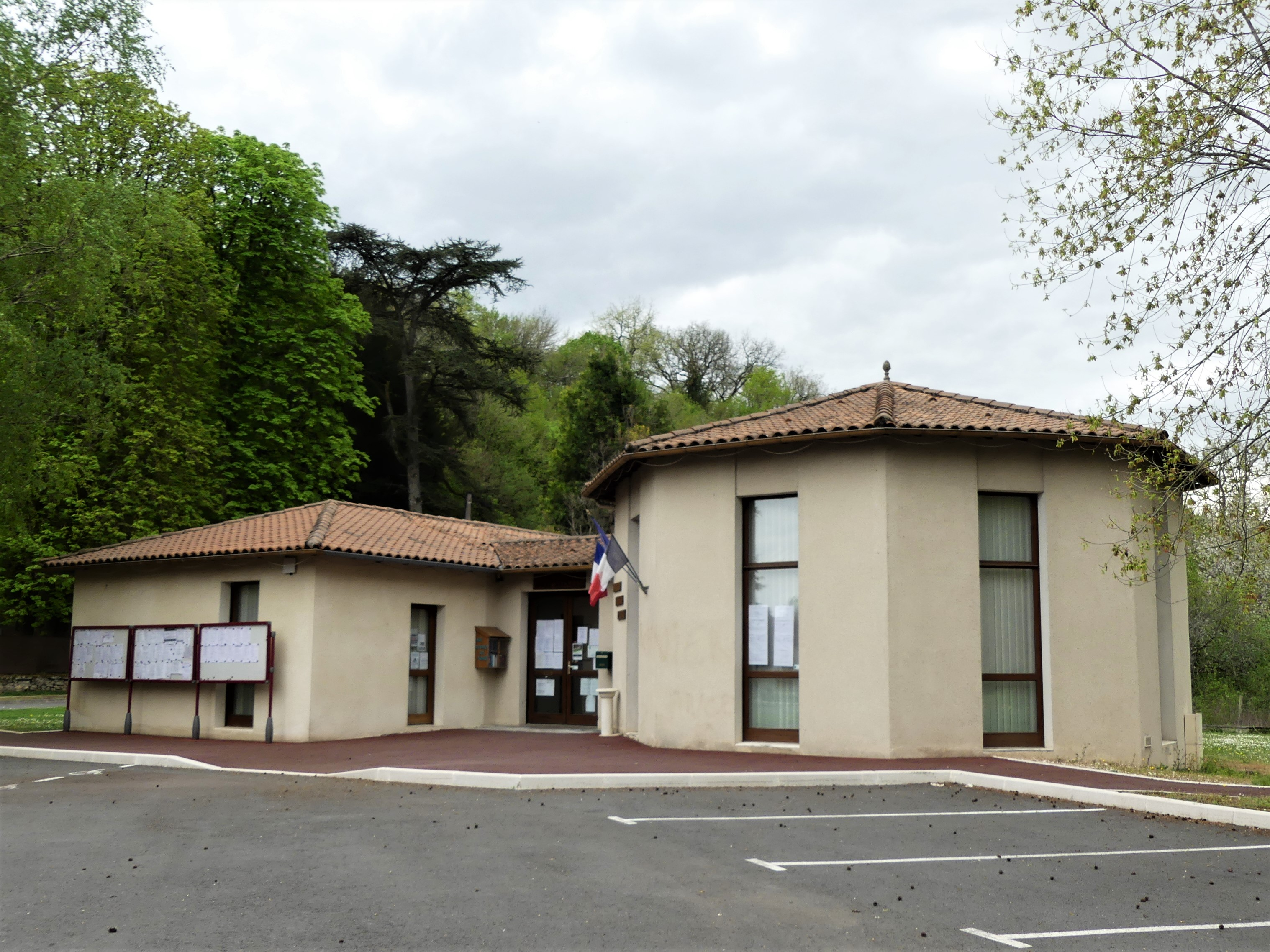
- The town hall in Saint-Martial-de-Valette

- Coat of arms
- Location of Saint-Martial-de-Valette
- Location within France Location within Nouvelle-Aquitaine
- Coordinates: 45°31′02″N 0°39′03″E
- Country: France
- Region: Nouvelle-Aquitaine
- Department: Dordogne
- Arrondissement: Nontron
- Canton: Périgord Vert Nontronnais

Government
  - Mayor (2020–2026): Alain Lagorce
- Area^{1}: 15.71 km^{2} (6.07 sq mi)
- Highest elevation: 266 m (873 ft)
- Lowest elevation: 135 m (443 ft)
- Population (2023): 803
  - Density: 51.1/km^{2} (132/sq mi)
- Time zone: UTC+01:00 (CET)
  - Summer (DST): UTC+02:00 (CEST)
- INSEE/Postal code: 24451 /24300
- ^{1} French Land Register data, which excludes lakes, ponds, glaciers > 1 km^{2} (0.386 sq mi or 247 acres) and river estuaries.

Saint-Martial-de-Valette (French pronunciation: [sɛ̃ maʁsjal də valɛt]; Occitan: Sent Marçau de Valeta) is a commune in the Dordogne department in Nouvelle-Aquitaine in southwestern France.

== Population ==
Historical population
Year	Pop.	±% p.a.
1968	806	—
1975	788	−0.32%
1982	747	−0.76%
1990	855	+1.70%
1999	790	−0.87%
2007	846	+0.86%
2012	830	−0.38%
2017	789	−1.01%
2023	803	+0.29%
Source: INSEE

== See also ==
- Communes of the Dordogne department
