= Savignac-de-Nontron =

- Commune
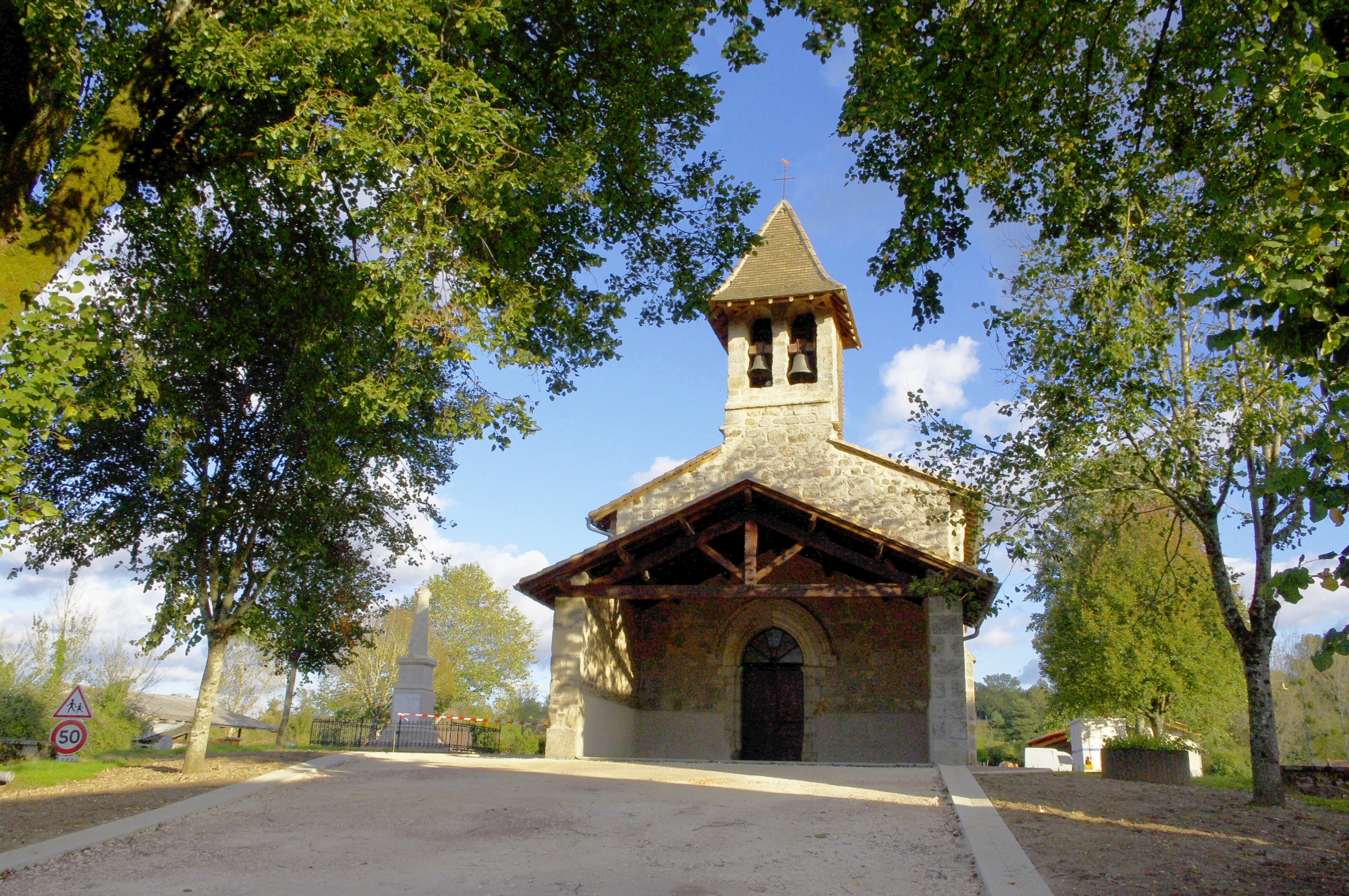
- The church in Savignac-de-Nontron
- Location of Savignac-de-Nontron
- Location within France Location within Nouvelle-Aquitaine
- Coordinates: 45°32′35″N 0°43′26″E
- Country: France
- Region: Nouvelle-Aquitaine
- Department: Dordogne
- Arrondissement: Nontron
- Canton: Périgord Vert Nontronnais
- Intercommunality: Périgord nontronnais

Government
  - Mayor (2020–2026): René Gardillou
- Area^{1}: 9.69 km^{2} (3.74 sq mi)
- Elevation: 254 m (833 ft)
- Highest elevation: 303 m (994 ft)
- Lowest elevation: 185 m (607 ft)
- Population (2023): 211
  - Density: 21.8/km^{2} (56.4/sq mi)
- Time zone: UTC+01:00 (CET)
  - Summer (DST): UTC+02:00 (CEST)
- INSEE/Postal code: 24525 /24300
- ^{1} French Land Register data, which excludes lakes, ponds, glaciers > 1 km^{2} (0.386 sq mi or 247 acres) and river estuaries.

Savignac-de-Nontron (French pronunciation: [saviɲak də nɔ̃tʁɔ̃], literally Savignac of Nontron; Occitan: Savinhac de Nontronh) is a commune in the Dordogne department in Nouvelle-Aquitaine in southwestern France.

== Population ==
Historical population
Year	Pop.	±% p.a.
1968	205	—
1975	191	−1.01%
1982	174	−1.32%
1990	189	+1.04%
1999	187	−0.12%
2007	191	+0.26%
2012	193	+0.21%
2017	191	−0.21%
2023	211	+1.67%
Source: INSEE

== See also ==
- Communes of the Dordogne département
