= Saint-Félix-de-Bourdeilles =

- Commune
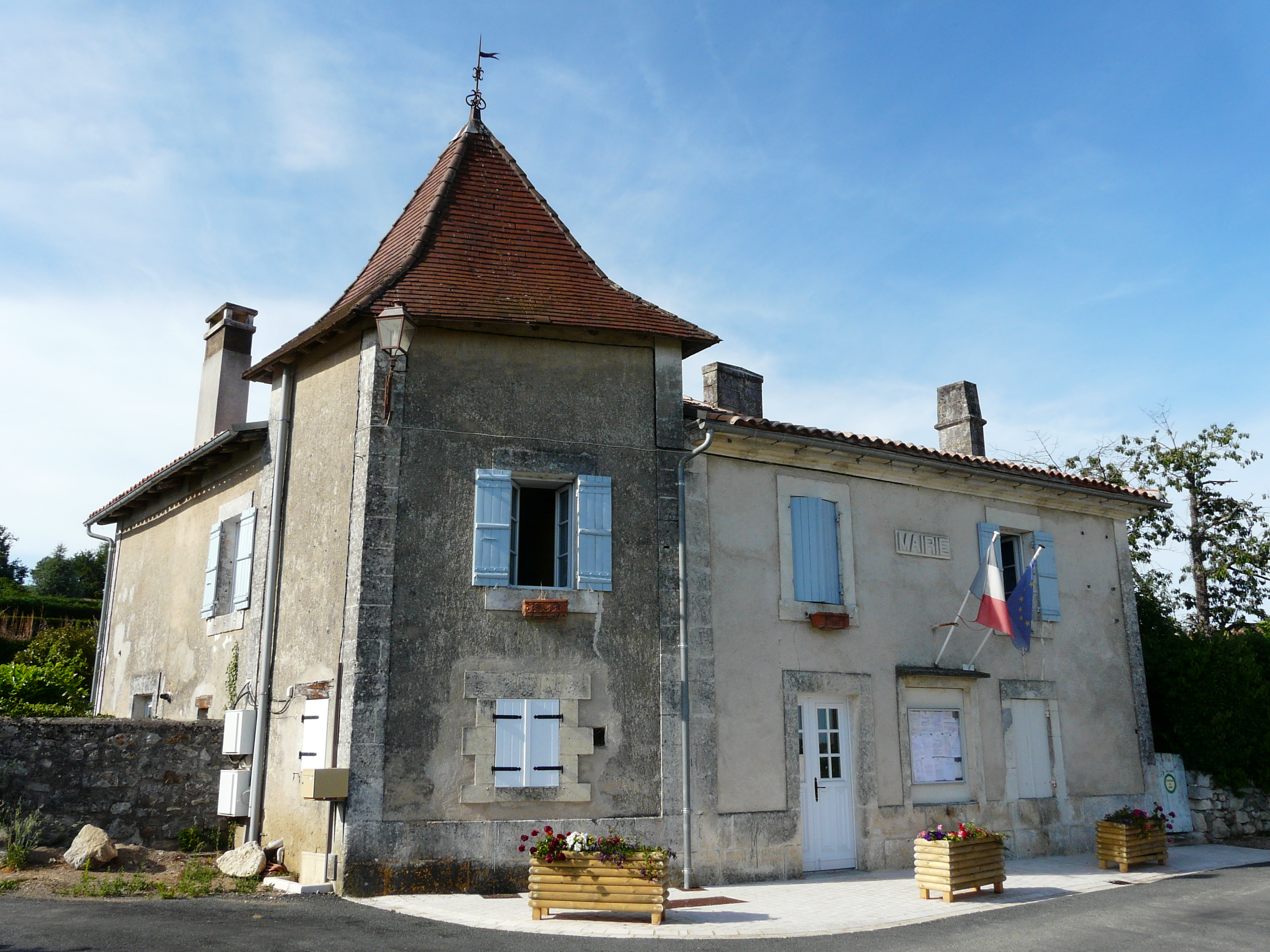
- The town hall in Saint-Félix-de-Bourdeilles

- Coat of arms
- Location of Saint-Félix-de-Bourdeilles
- Location within France Location within Nouvelle-Aquitaine
- Coordinates: 45°25′00″N 0°34′09″E
- Country: France
- Region: Nouvelle-Aquitaine
- Department: Dordogne
- Arrondissement: Nontron
- Canton: Brantôme en Périgord

Government
  - Mayor (2020–2026): Anémone Landais
- Area^{1}: 6.06 km^{2} (2.34 sq mi)
- Elevation: 200 m (660 ft)
- Highest elevation: 227 m (745 ft)
- Lowest elevation: 116 m (381 ft)
- Population (2023): 72
  - Density: 12/km^{2} (31/sq mi)
- Time zone: UTC+01:00 (CET)
  - Summer (DST): UTC+02:00 (CEST)
- INSEE/Postal code: 24403 /24340
- ^{1} French Land Register data, which excludes lakes, ponds, glaciers > 1 km^{2} (0.386 sq mi or 247 acres) and river estuaries.

Saint-Félix-de-Bourdeilles (French pronunciation: [sɛ̃ feliks də buʁdɛj], literally Saint-Félix of Bourdeilles; Limousin: Sent Feliç de Maruèlh) is a commune in the Dordogne department in Nouvelle-Aquitaine in southwestern France.

== Population ==
Historical population
Year	Pop.	±% p.a.
1968	85	—
1975	85	+0.00%
1982	61	−4.63%
1990	53	−1.74%
1999	58	+1.01%
2007	72	+2.74%
2012	70	−0.56%
2017	62	−2.40%
2023	72	+2.52%
Source: INSEE

== See also ==
- Communes of the Dordogne department
