= Devouassoux =

Devouassoux is a surname. Notable people with the surname include:

- Gérard Devouassoux (1940–1974), French mountaineer and mountain guide
- Jonas Devouassoux (born 1989), French freestyle skier
- Patrick Devouassoux, rescuer in the 1999 Mont Blanc tunnel fire

== See also ==
- François Devouassoud (1831–1905), French mountaineer and mountain guide
