= Champagnac-de-Belair =

- Commune
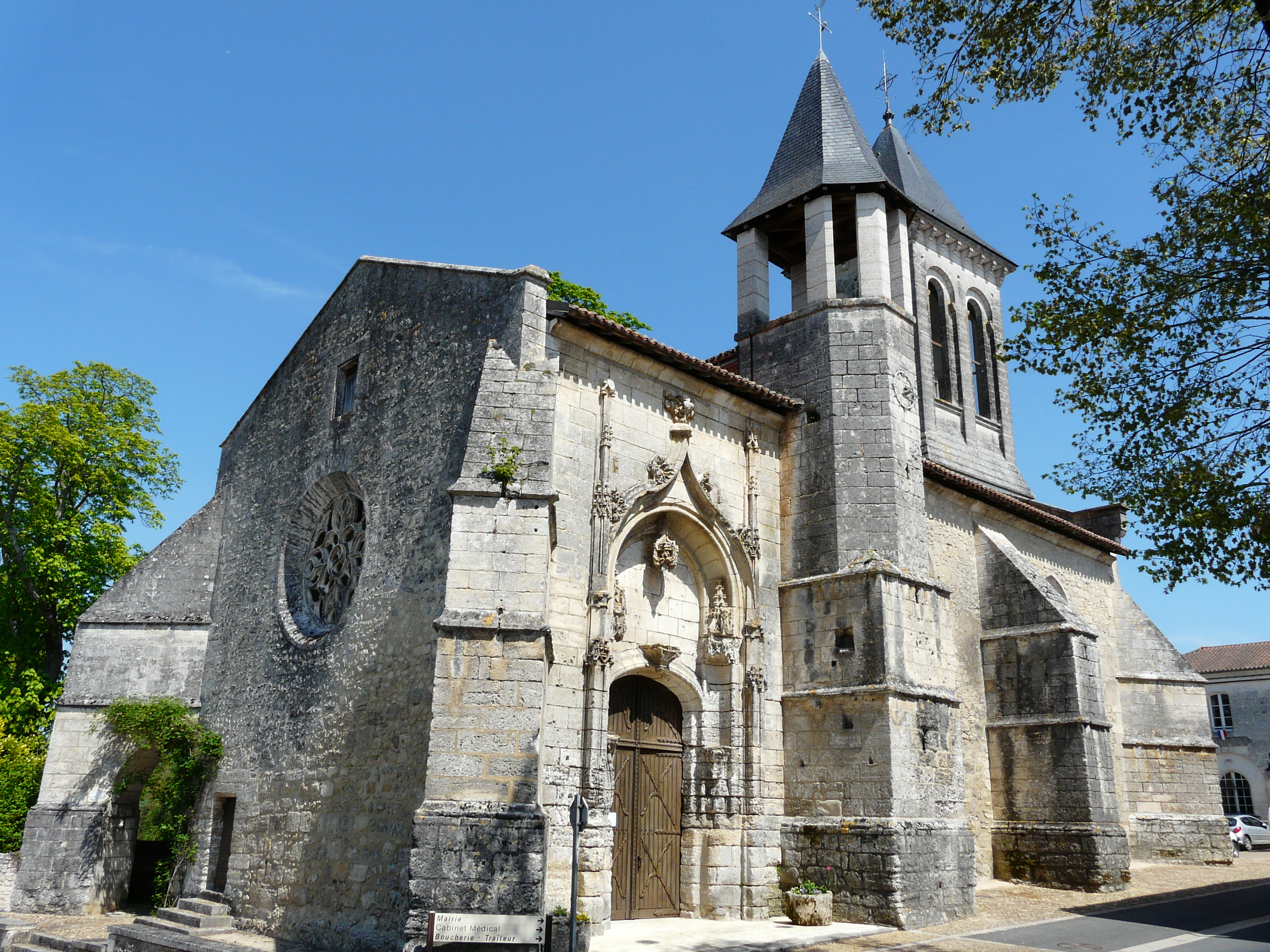
- The church in Champagnac-de-Belair

- Coat of arms
- Location of Champagnac-de-Belair
- Location within France Location within Nouvelle-Aquitaine
- Coordinates: 45°23′39″N 0°42′02″E
- Country: France
- Region: Nouvelle-Aquitaine
- Department: Dordogne
- Arrondissement: Nontron
- Canton: Brantôme en Périgord

Government
  - Mayor (2020–2026): Gérard Lacoste
- Area^{1}: 18.46 km^{2} (7.13 sq mi)
- Elevation: 115 m (377 ft)
- Highest elevation: 222 m (728 ft)
- Lowest elevation: 105 m (344 ft)
- Population (2023): 767
  - Density: 41.5/km^{2} (108/sq mi)
- Time zone: UTC+01:00 (CET)
  - Summer (DST): UTC+02:00 (CEST)
- INSEE/Postal code: 24096 /24530
- ^{1} French Land Register data, which excludes lakes, ponds, glaciers > 1 km^{2} (0.386 sq mi or 247 acres) and river estuaries.

Champagnac-de-Belair (French pronunciation: [ʃɑ̃paɲak də bɛlɛʁ]; Occitan: Champanhac) is a commune in the Dordogne department in Nouvelle-Aquitaine in southwestern France.

== Population ==
Historical population
Year	Pop.	±% p.a.
1968	590	—
1975	557	−0.82%
1982	606	+1.21%
1990	658	+1.03%
1999	685	+0.45%
2007	725	+0.71%
2012	698	−0.76%
2017	752	+1.50%
2023	767	+0.33%
Source: INSEE

== See also ==
- Communes of the Dordogne department
