= La Chapelle-Montmoreau =

- Commune
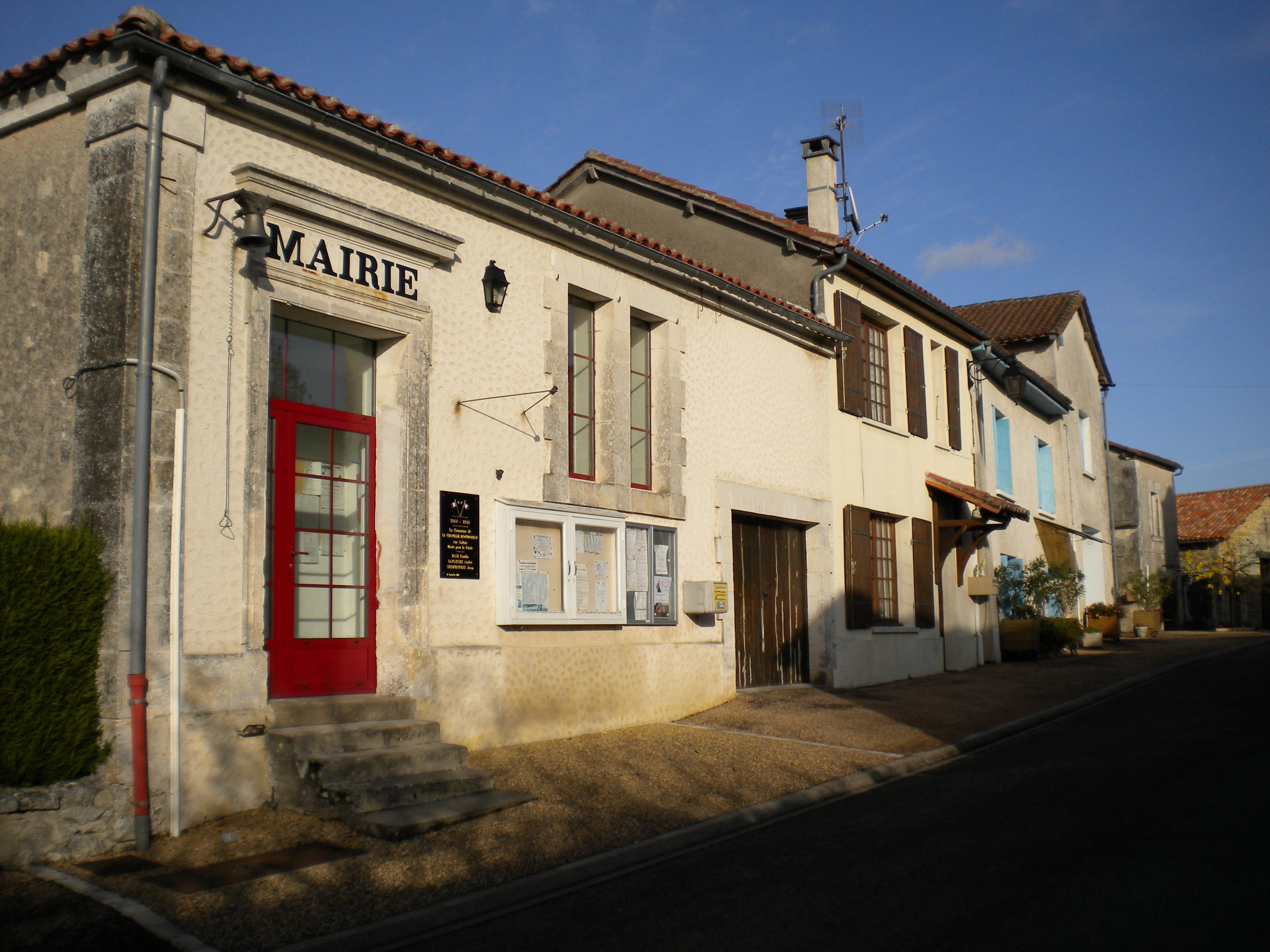
- The town hall in La Chapelle-Montmoreau
- Location of La Chapelle-Montmoreau
- Location within France Location within Nouvelle-Aquitaine
- Coordinates: 45°26′58″N 0°38′37″E
- Country: France
- Region: Nouvelle-Aquitaine
- Department: Dordogne
- Arrondissement: Nontron
- Canton: Brantôme en Périgord

Government
  - Mayor (2020–2026): Alain Peyrou
- Area^{1}: 8.09 km^{2} (3.12 sq mi)
- Elevation: 179 m (587 ft)
- Highest elevation: 226 m (741 ft)
- Lowest elevation: 150 m (490 ft)
- Population (2023): 75
  - Density: 9.3/km^{2} (24/sq mi)
- Time zone: UTC+01:00 (CET)
  - Summer (DST): UTC+02:00 (CEST)
- INSEE/Postal code: 24111 /24300
- ^{1} French Land Register data, which excludes lakes, ponds, glaciers > 1 km^{2} (0.386 sq mi or 247 acres) and river estuaries.

La Chapelle-Montmoreau (French pronunciation: [la ʃapɛl mɔ̃mɔʁo]; Occitan: La Chapela de Montmaurelh) is a commune in the Dordogne department in Nouvelle-Aquitaine in southwestern France.

== Population ==
Historical population
Year	Pop.	±% p.a.
1968	85	—
1975	79	−1.04%
1982	88	+1.55%
1990	87	−0.14%
1999	91	+0.50%
2007	76	−2.23%
2012	72	−1.08%
2017	68	−1.14%
2023	75	+1.65%
Source: INSEE

== See also ==
- Communes of the Dordogne department
