= Château de Beauséjour (Tocane-Saint-Apre) =

Château in Nouvelle-Aquitaine, France

Coordinates: 45°15′14″N 0°28′30″E

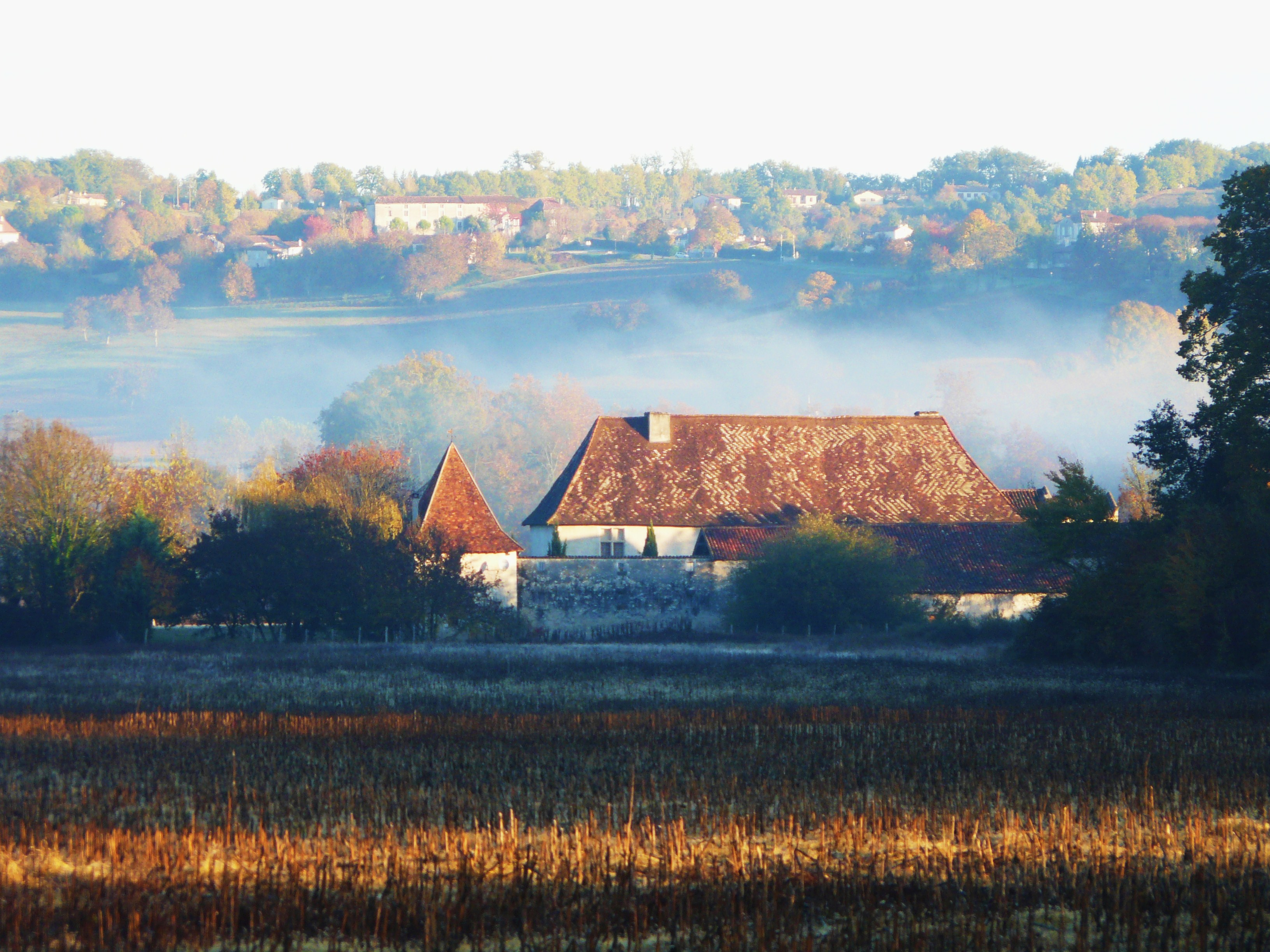

Château de Beauséjour is a château in Tocane-Saint-Apre, Dordogne, Nouvelle-Aquitaine, France.
