= Canton of Brantôme en Périgord =

Coordinates: 45°20′N 0°39′E

Brantôme
- Canton
- Interactive map of Brantôme
- Country: France
- Region: Nouvelle-Aquitaine
- Department: Dordogne
- No. of communes: {{{nbcomm}}}
- Area: 663.61 km^{2} (256.22 sq mi)
- Population (2023): 16,755
  - Density: 25.248/km^{2} (65.393/sq mi)
- INSEE code: 2403

The Canton of Brantôme en Périgord (before March 2020: canton of Brantôme) is a canton of the Dordogne department, in France. The lowest point is 63 m, and the highest point is 251 m. At the French canton reorganisation which came into effect in March 2015, the canton of Brantôme was expanded from 11 to 42 communes (17 of which merged into the new communes Brantôme en Périgord and Mareuil en Périgord):

- Biras
- Bourdeilles
- Brantôme en Périgord
- Bussac
- Chapdeuil
- Champagnac-de-Belair
- La Chapelle-Faucher
- La Chapelle-Montmoreau
- Condat-sur-Trincou
- Creyssac
- Douchapt
- Grand-Brassac
- Lisle
- Mareuil en Périgord
- Montagrier
- Paussac-et-Saint-Vivien
- Quinsac
- La Rochebeaucourt-et-Argentine
- Rudeau-Ladosse
- Saint-Félix-de-Bourdeilles
- Saint-Just
- Saint-Pancrace
- Saint-Victor
- Sainte-Croix-de-Mareuil
- Segonzac
- Tocane-Saint-Apre
- Villars

== Population history ==
Historical population
Year	Pop.	±% p.a.
2013	16,654	—
2018	16,457	−0.24%
Source: INSEE

== See also ==
- Cantons of the Dordogne department
