= Chapdeuil =

- Commune
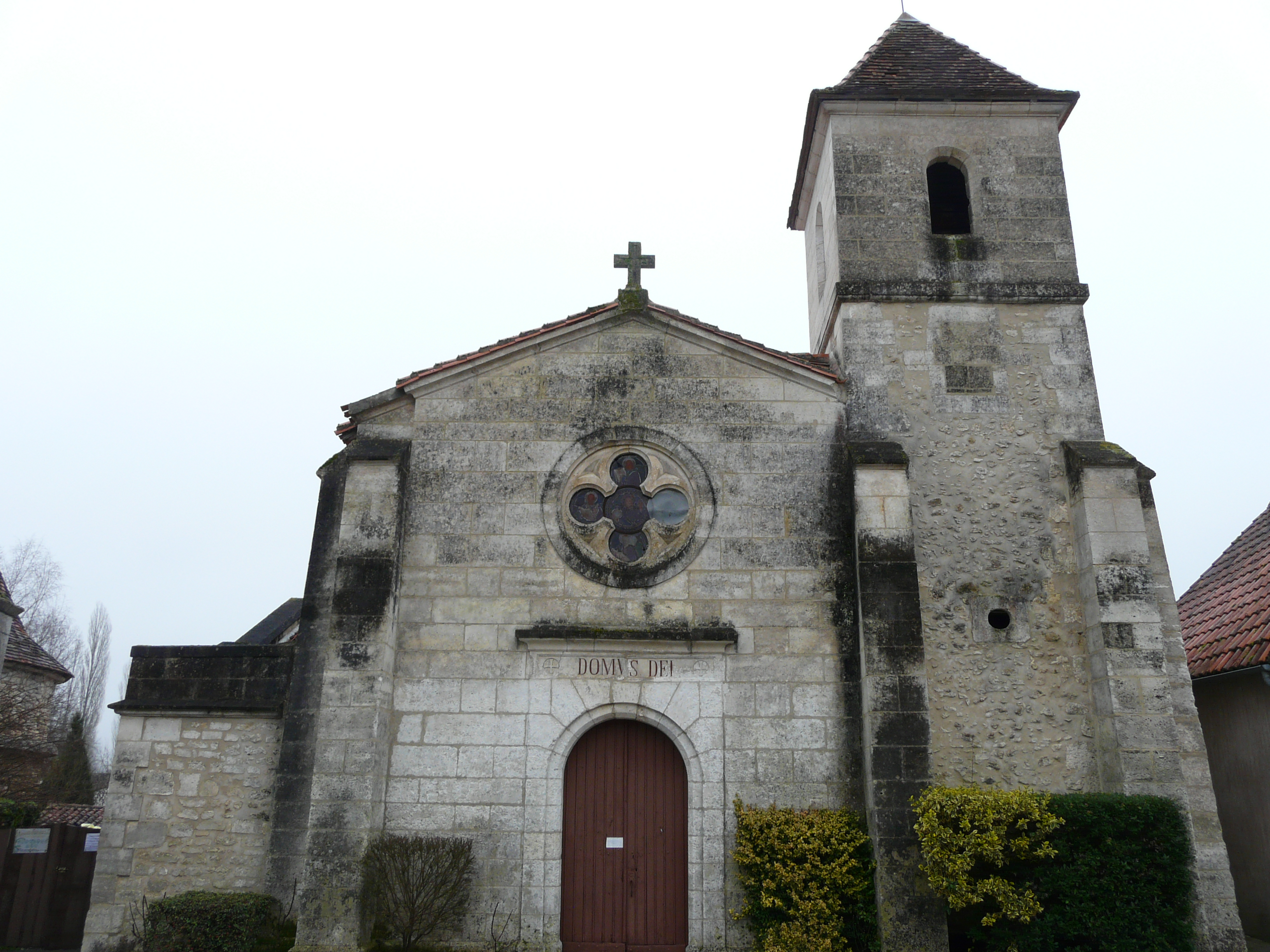
- The church in Chapdeuil
- Location of Chapdeuil
- Location within France Location within Nouvelle-Aquitaine
- Coordinates: 45°20′35″N 0°28′34″E
- Country: France
- Region: Nouvelle-Aquitaine
- Department: Dordogne
- Arrondissement: Périgueux
- Canton: Brantôme en Périgord

Government
  - Mayor (2020–2026): Lisa Boyer
- Area^{1}: 7.71 km^{2} (2.98 sq mi)
- Elevation: 124 m (407 ft)
- Highest elevation: 186 m (610 ft)
- Lowest elevation: 115 m (377 ft)
- Population (2023): 142
  - Density: 18.4/km^{2} (47.7/sq mi)
- Time zone: UTC+01:00 (CET)
  - Summer (DST): UTC+02:00 (CEST)
- INSEE/Postal code: 24105 /24320
- ^{1} French Land Register data, which excludes lakes, ponds, glaciers > 1 km^{2} (0.386 sq mi or 247 acres) and river estuaries.

Chapdeuil (French pronunciation: [ʃapdœj]; Occitan: Lo Chapduelh) is a commune in the Dordogne department in Nouvelle-Aquitaine in southwestern France.

== Population ==
Historical population
Year	Pop.	±% p.a.
1968	162	—
1975	139	−2.16%
1982	133	−0.63%
1990	124	−0.87%
1999	111	−1.22%
2007	117	+0.66%
2012	143	+4.10%
2017	130	−1.89%
2023	142	+1.48%
Source: INSEE

== See also ==
- Communes of the Dordogne department
