= Grand-Brassac =

- Commune
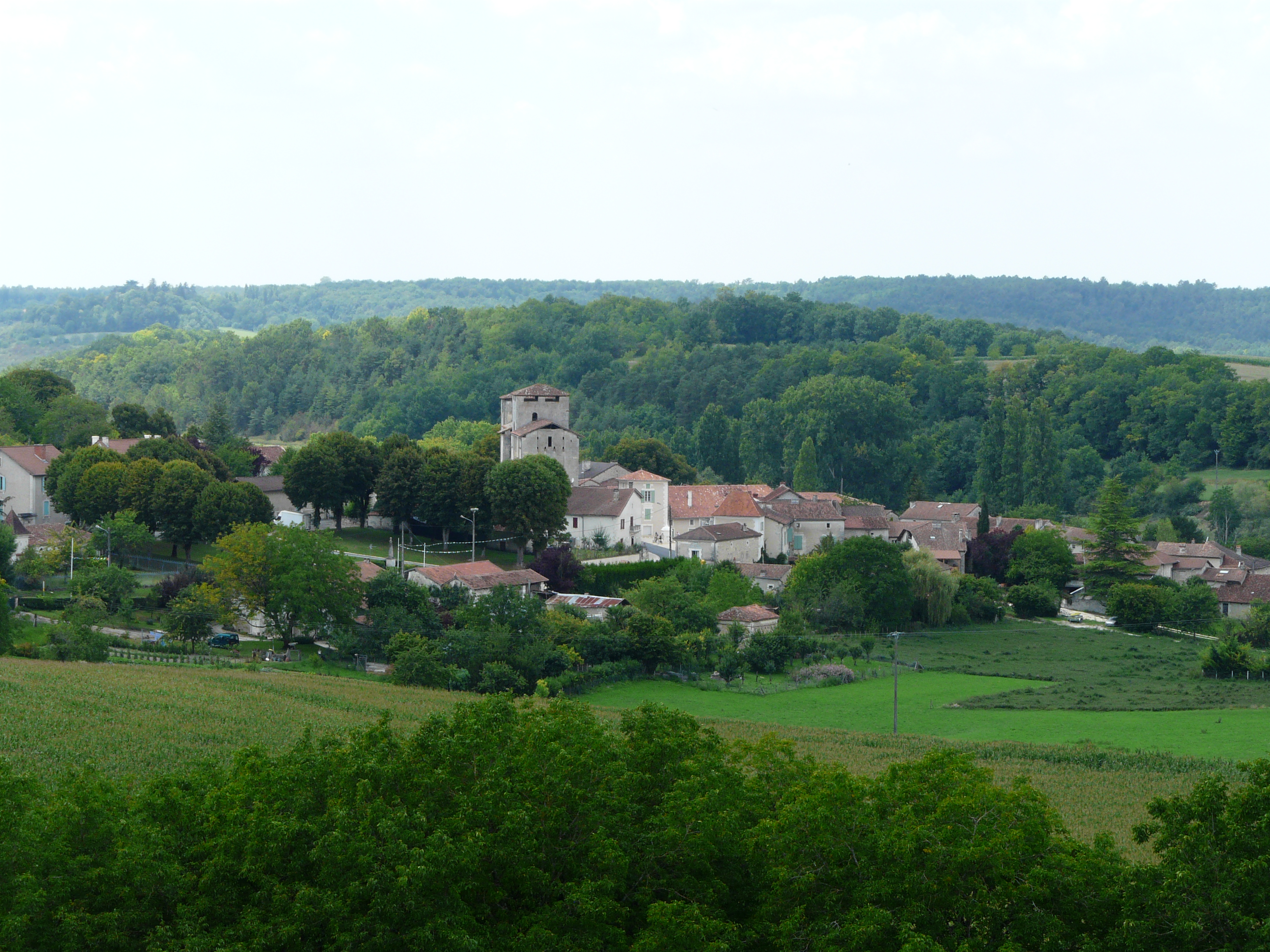
- A general view of Grand-Brassac
- Location of Grand-Brassac
- Location within France Location within Nouvelle-Aquitaine
- Coordinates: 45°17′42″N 0°28′46″E
- Country: France
- Region: Nouvelle-Aquitaine
- Department: Dordogne
- Arrondissement: Périgueux
- Canton: Brantôme en Périgord

Government
  - Mayor (2020–2026): Philippe Boismoreau
- Area^{1}: 31.74 km^{2} (12.25 sq mi)
- Elevation: 150 m (490 ft)
- Highest elevation: 211 m (692 ft)
- Lowest elevation: 73 m (240 ft)
- Population (2023): 555
  - Density: 17.5/km^{2} (45.3/sq mi)
- Time zone: UTC+01:00 (CET)
  - Summer (DST): UTC+02:00 (CEST)
- INSEE/Postal code: 24200 /24350
- ^{1} French Land Register data, which excludes lakes, ponds, glaciers > 1 km^{2} (0.386 sq mi or 247 acres) and river estuaries.

Grand-Brassac (French pronunciation: [ɡʁɑ̃ bʁasak]; Occitan: Grand Braçac) is a commune in the Dordogne department in Nouvelle-Aquitaine in southwestern France.

== Population ==
Historical population
| Year | Pop. | ±% p.a. |
|---|---|---|
| 1968 | 676 | — |
| 1975 | 609 | −1.48% |
| 1982 | 528 | −2.02% |
| 1990 | 488 | −0.98% |
| 1999 | 489 | +0.02% |
| 2007 | 530 | +1.01% |
| 2012 | 527 | −0.11% |
| 2017 | 535 | +0.30% |
| 2023 | 555 | +0.61% |
Source: INSEE

== See also ==
- Communes of the Dordogne department
