= Château de Vaugoubert =

Château in France

Coordinates: 45°25′28″N 0°41′47″E

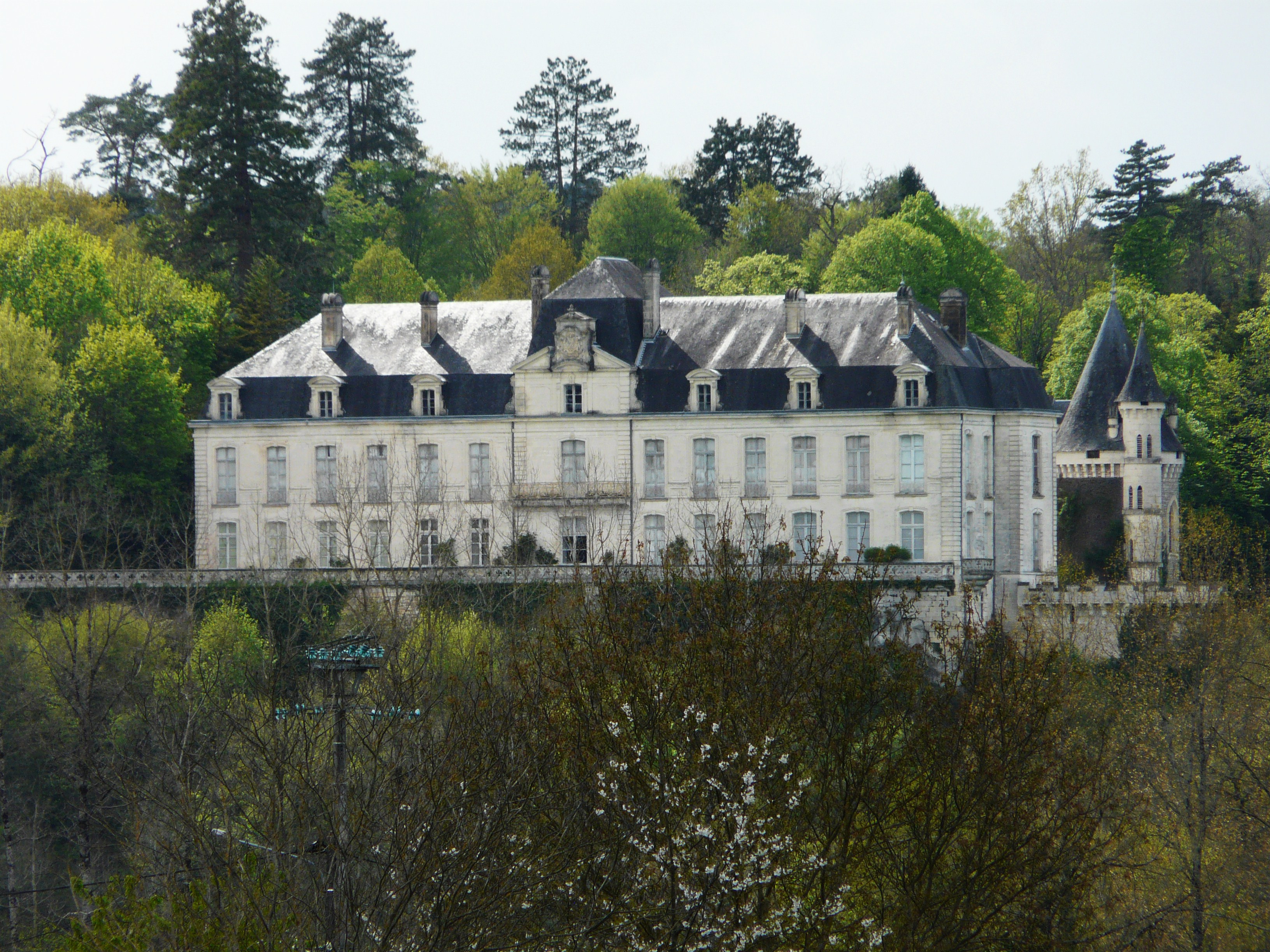

Château de Vaugoubert is a château in Quinsac, Dordogne, Nouvelle-Aquitaine, France. It was declared a monument historique in 1948.
