= Segonzac, Dordogne =

Segonzac
- Commune
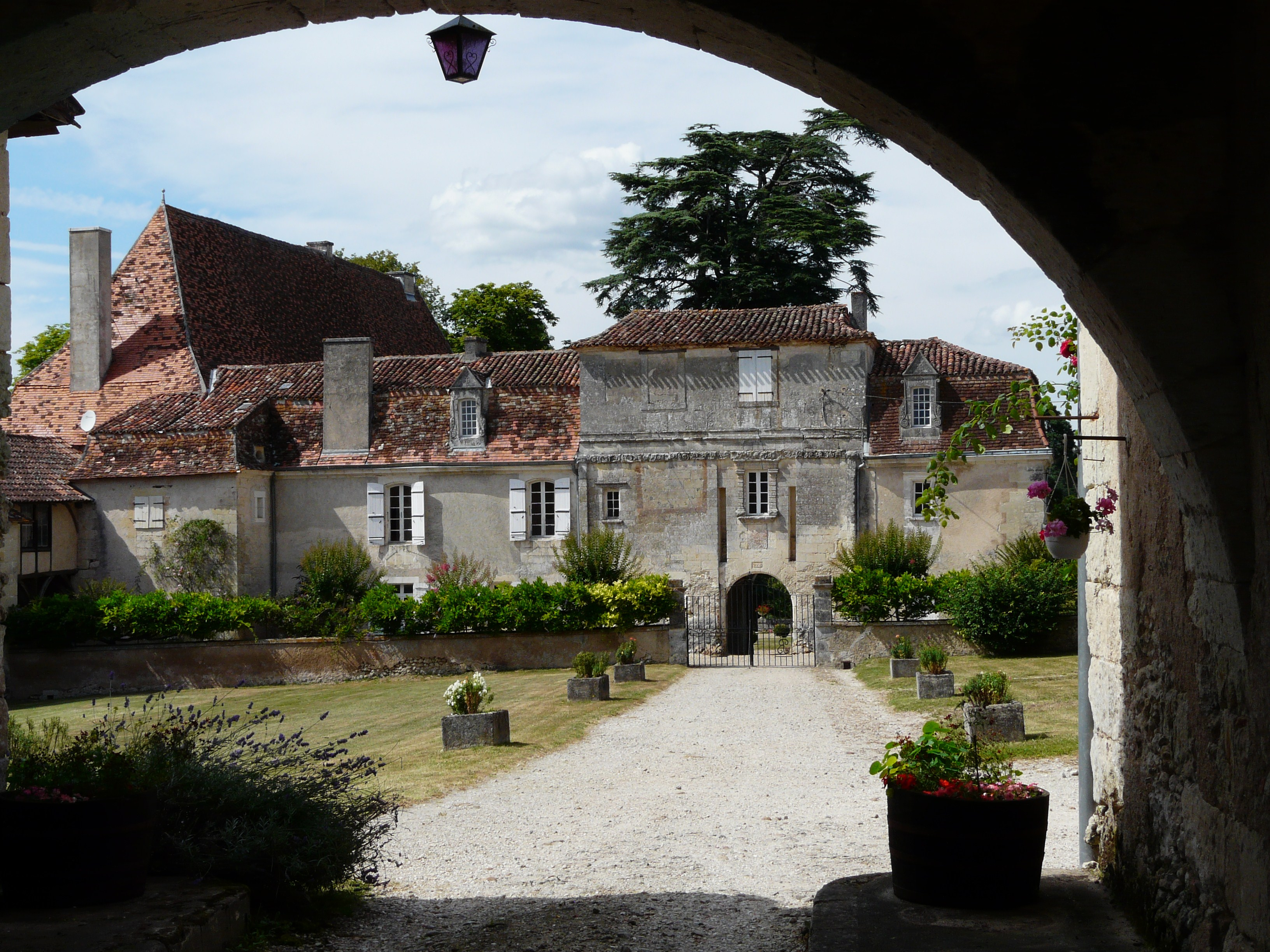
- Château

- Coat of arms
- Location of Segonzac
- Location within France Location within Nouvelle-Aquitaine
- Coordinates: 45°12′23″N 0°26′57″E
- Country: France
- Region: Nouvelle-Aquitaine
- Department: Dordogne
- Arrondissement: Périgueux
- Canton: Brantôme en Périgord

Government
  - Mayor (2020–2026): Christophe Rossard
- Area^{1}: 3.88 km^{2} (1.50 sq mi)
- Elevation: 180 m (590 ft)
- Highest elevation: 211 m (692 ft)
- Lowest elevation: 120 m (390 ft)
- Population (2023): 204
  - Density: 52.6/km^{2} (136/sq mi)
- Time zone: UTC+01:00 (CET)
  - Summer (DST): UTC+02:00 (CEST)
- INSEE/Postal code: 24529 /24600
- ^{1} French Land Register data, which excludes lakes, ponds, glaciers > 1 km^{2} (0.386 sq mi or 247 acres) and river estuaries.

Segonzac (French pronunciation: [səɡɔ̃zak]) is a commune in the Dordogne department in Nouvelle-Aquitaine in southwestern France.

== Population ==
Historical population
Year	Pop.	±% p.a.
1968	124	—
1975	233	+9.43%
1982	217	−1.01%
1990	210	−0.41%
1999	217	+0.36%
2007	221	+0.23%
2012	204	−1.59%
2017	205	+0.10%
2023	204	−0.08%
Source: INSEE

== See also ==
- Communes of the Dordogne département
