= Creyssac =

- Commune
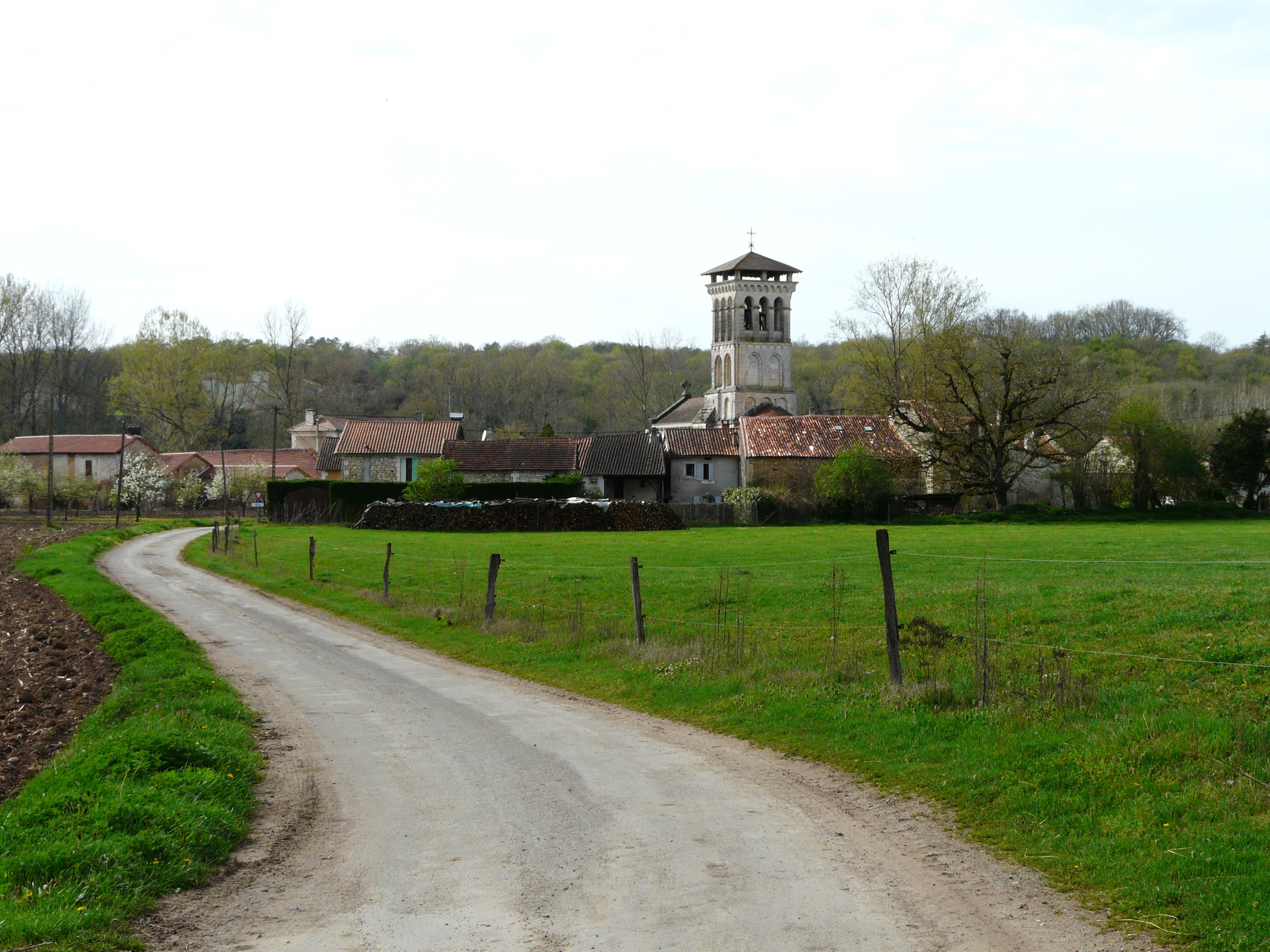
- A general view of Creyssac
- Location of Creyssac
- Location within France Location within Nouvelle-Aquitaine
- Coordinates: 45°18′31″N 0°33′10″E
- Country: France
- Region: Nouvelle-Aquitaine
- Department: Dordogne
- Arrondissement: Périgueux
- Canton: Brantôme en Périgord

Government
  - Mayor (2020–2026): Michel Desmoulin
- Area^{1}: 4.56 km^{2} (1.76 sq mi)
- Elevation: 100 m (330 ft)
- Highest elevation: 153 m (502 ft)
- Lowest elevation: 82 m (269 ft)
- Population (2023): 104
  - Density: 22.8/km^{2} (59.1/sq mi)
- Time zone: UTC+01:00 (CET)
  - Summer (DST): UTC+02:00 (CEST)
- INSEE/Postal code: 24144 /24350
- ^{1} French Land Register data, which excludes lakes, ponds, glaciers > 1 km^{2} (0.386 sq mi or 247 acres) and river estuaries.

Creyssac (French pronunciation: [kʁesak]; Occitan: Creissac) is a commune in the Dordogne department in Nouvelle-Aquitaine in southwestern France.

== Population ==
Historical population
Year	Pop.	±% p.a.
1968	95	—
1975	94	−0.15%
1982	83	−1.76%
1990	81	−0.30%
1999	99	+2.25%
2007	100	+0.13%
2012	89	−2.30%
2017	99	+2.15%
2023	104	+0.82%
Source: INSEE

== Gallery ==
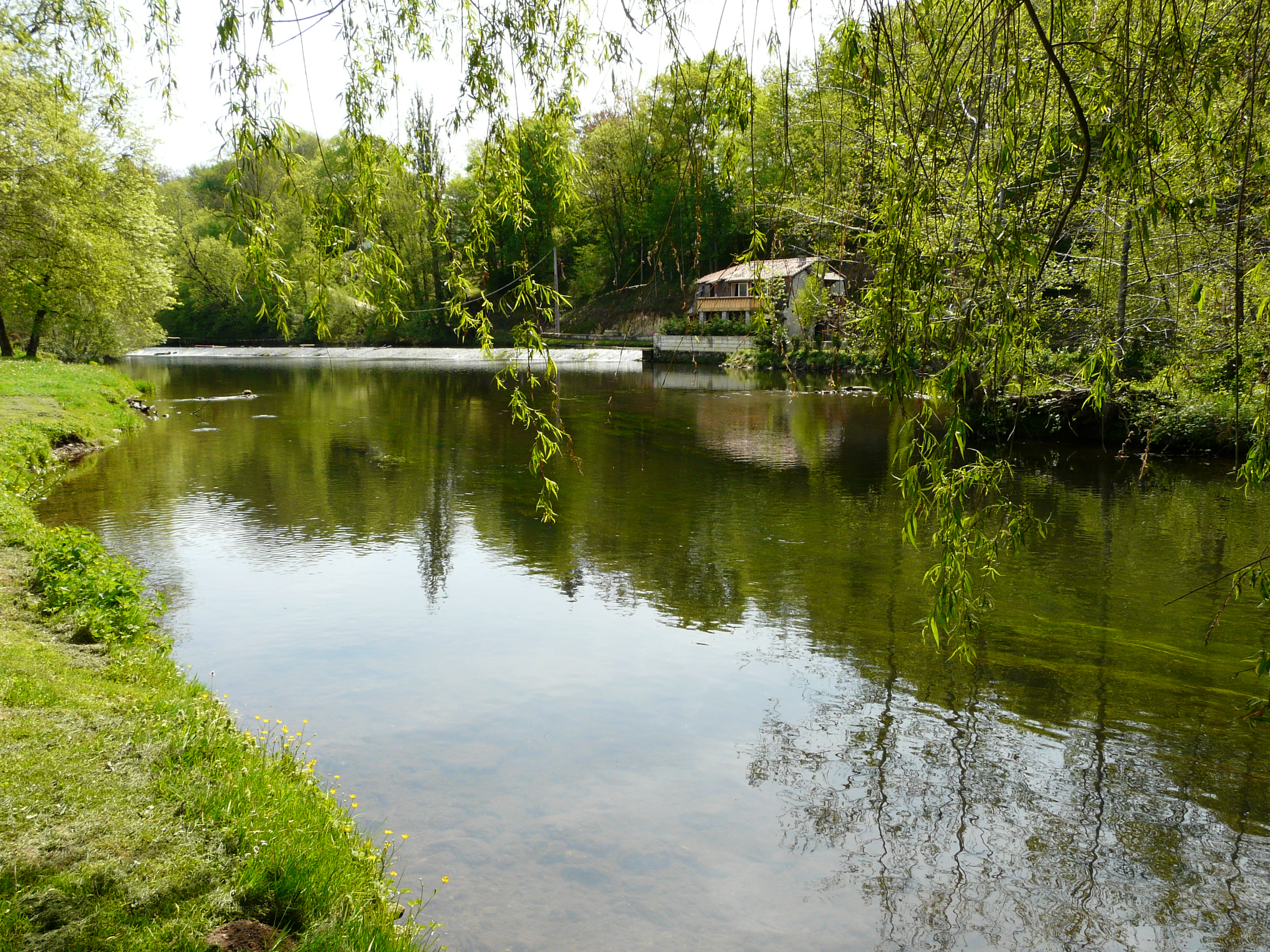
Gué de l'Éperon

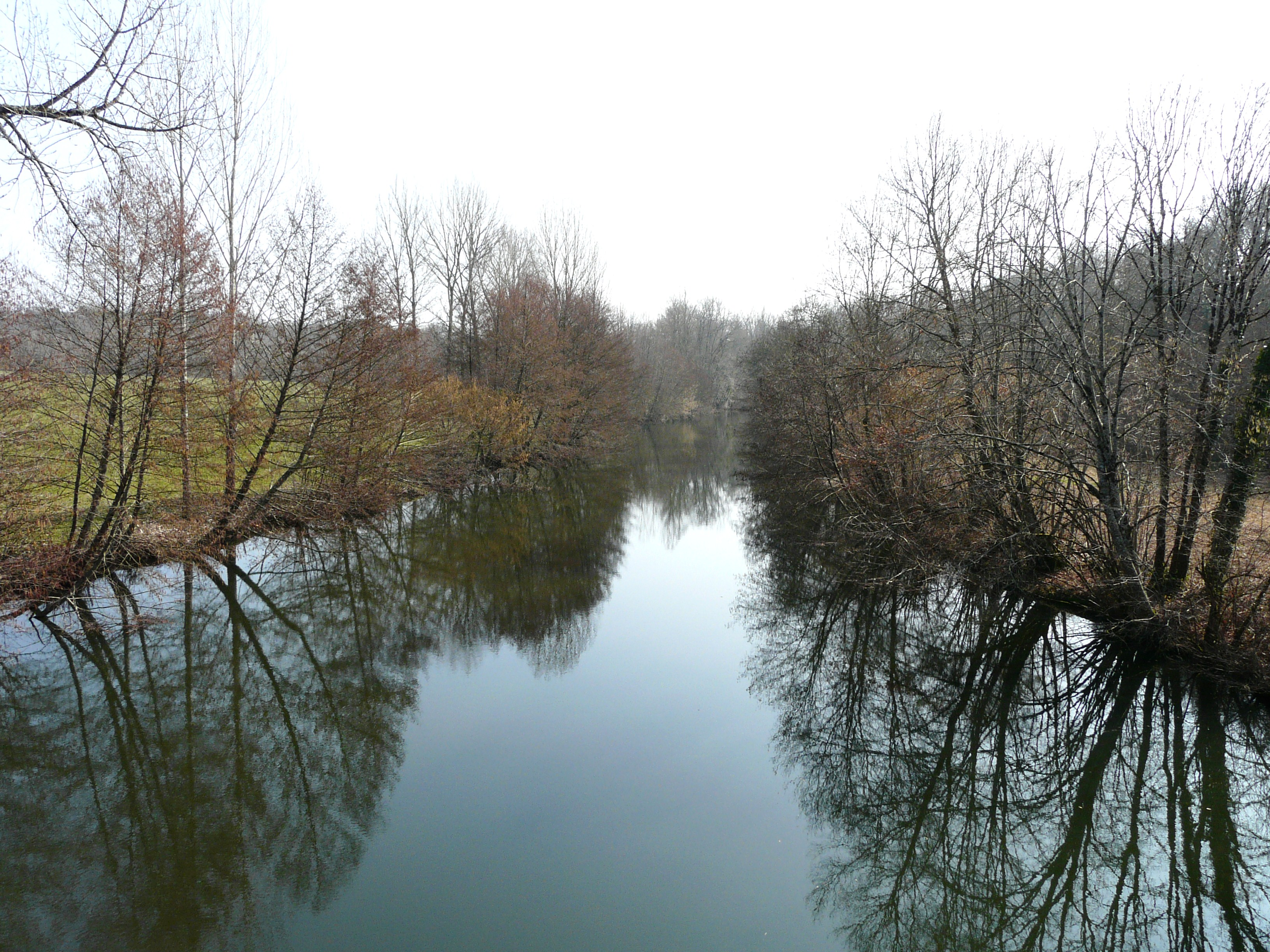
d'Ambon Pond

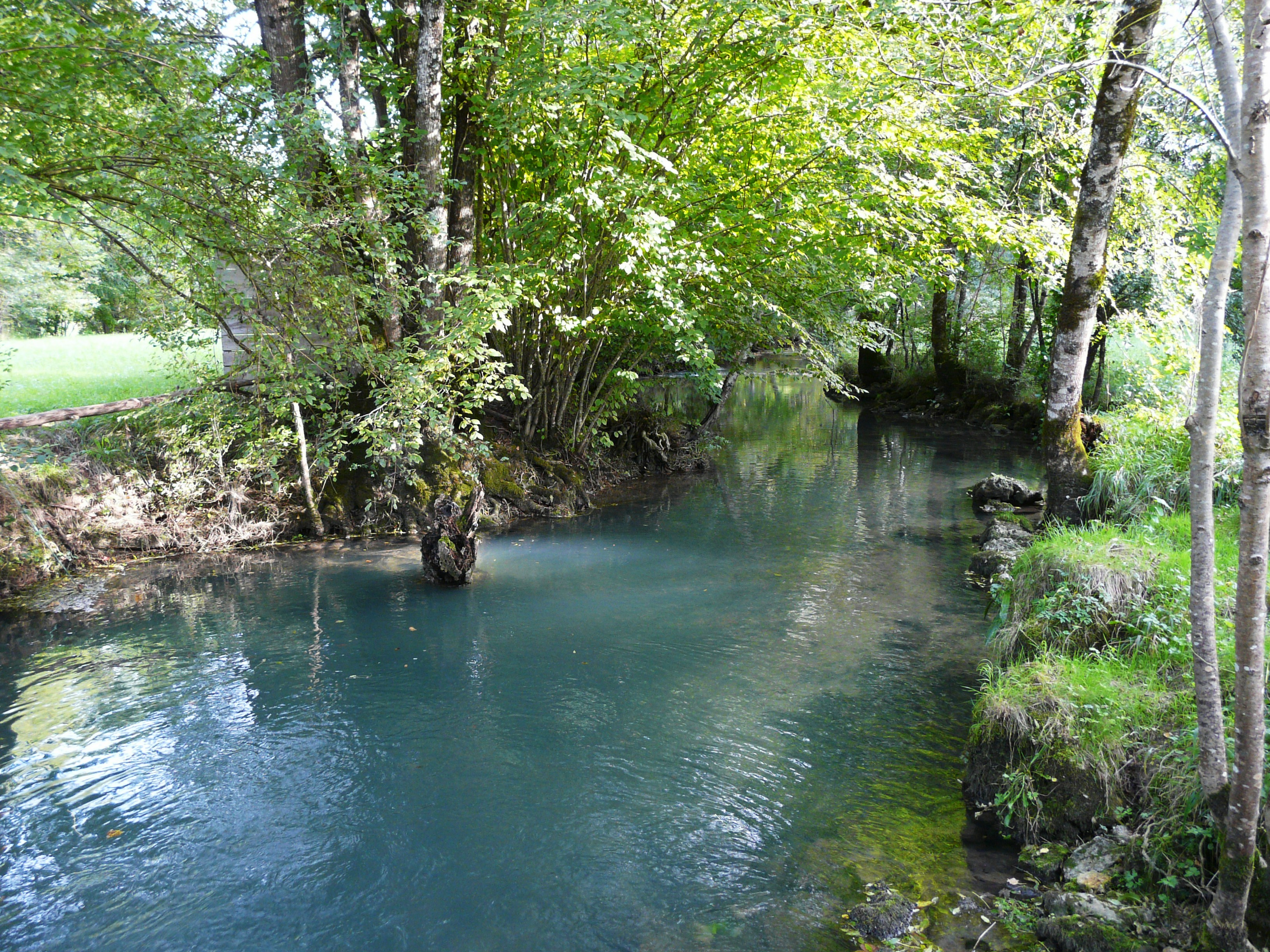
Le Boulou

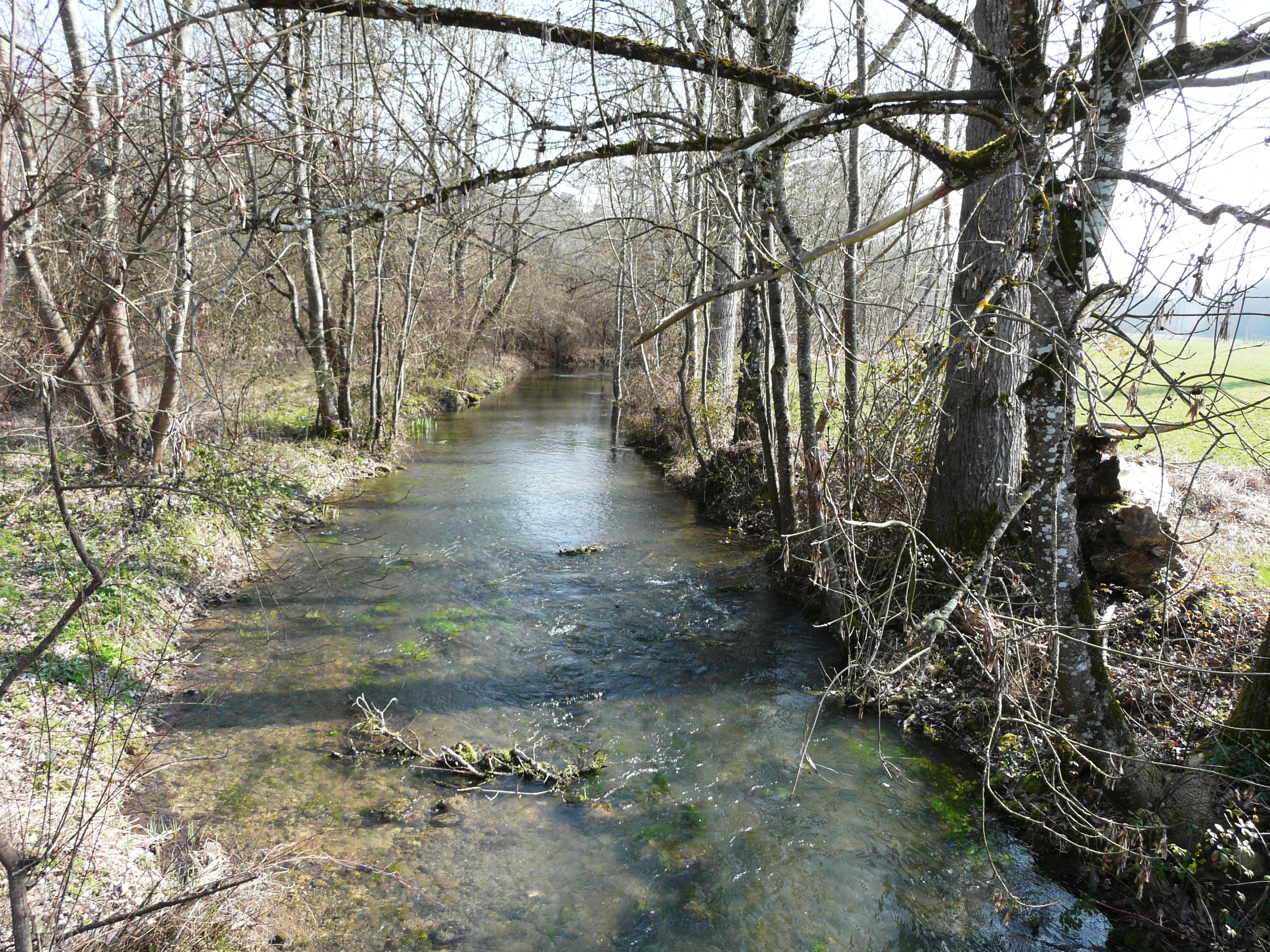
L'Euche

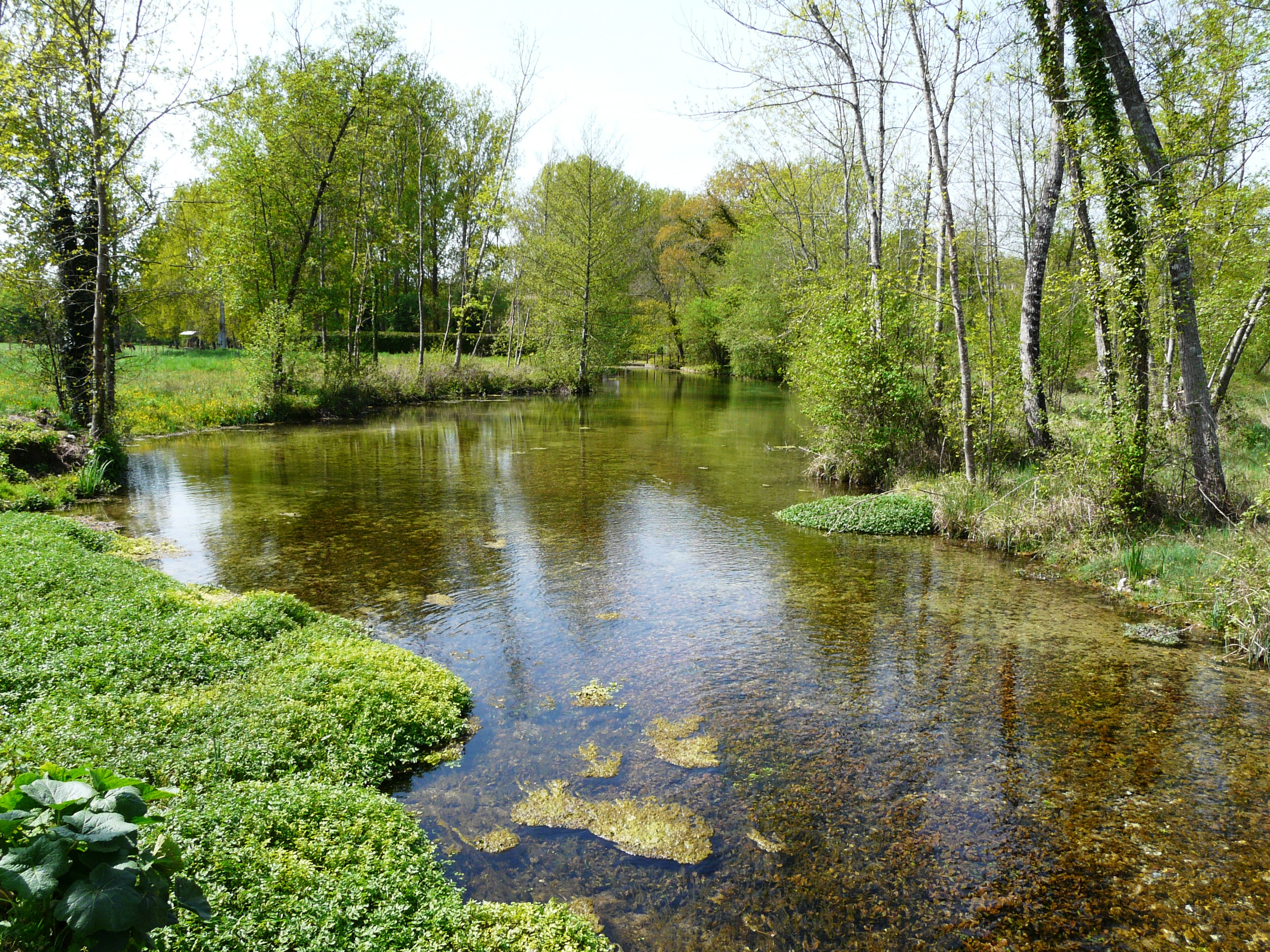
Le Bullidour

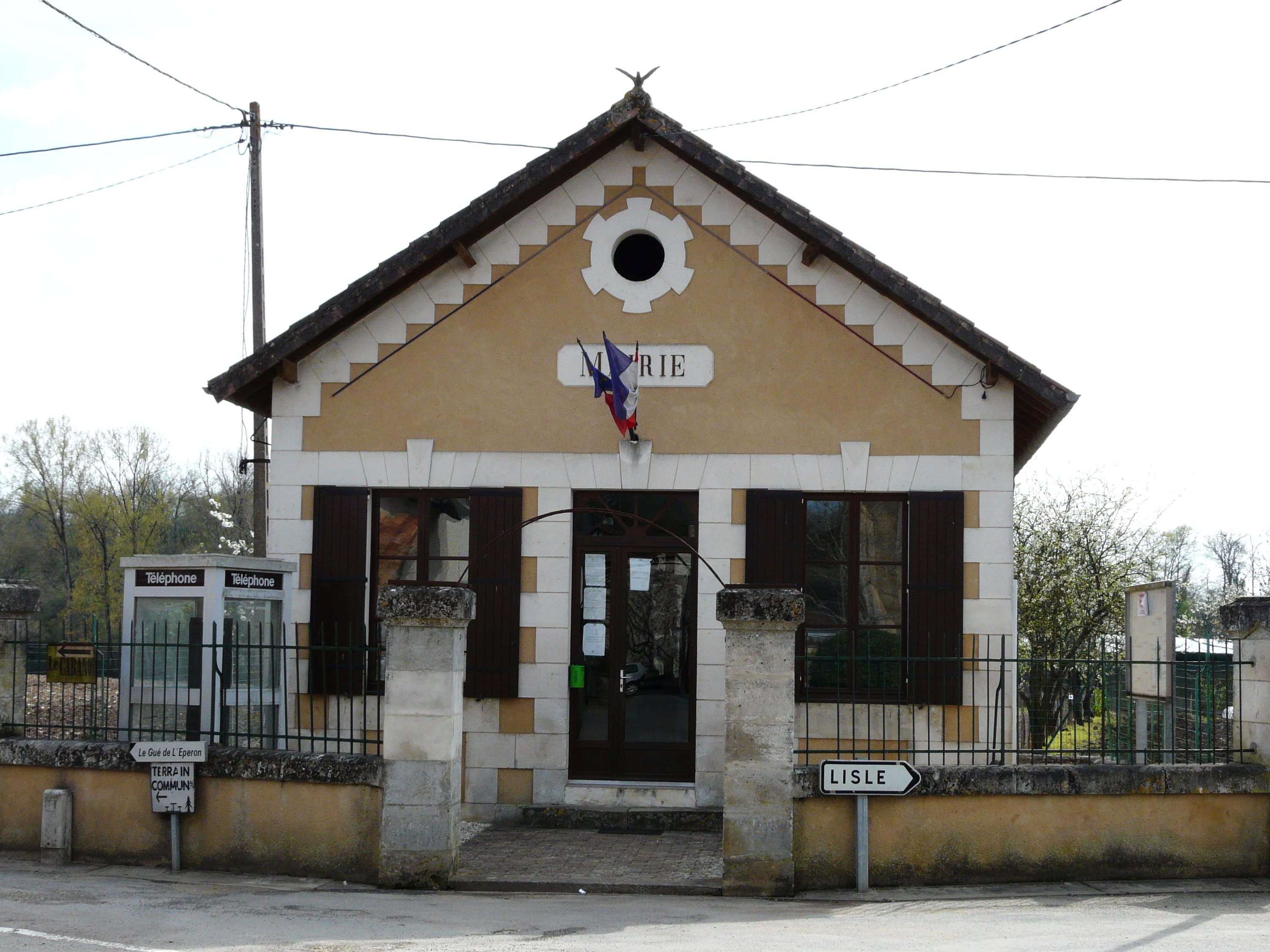
Town Hall

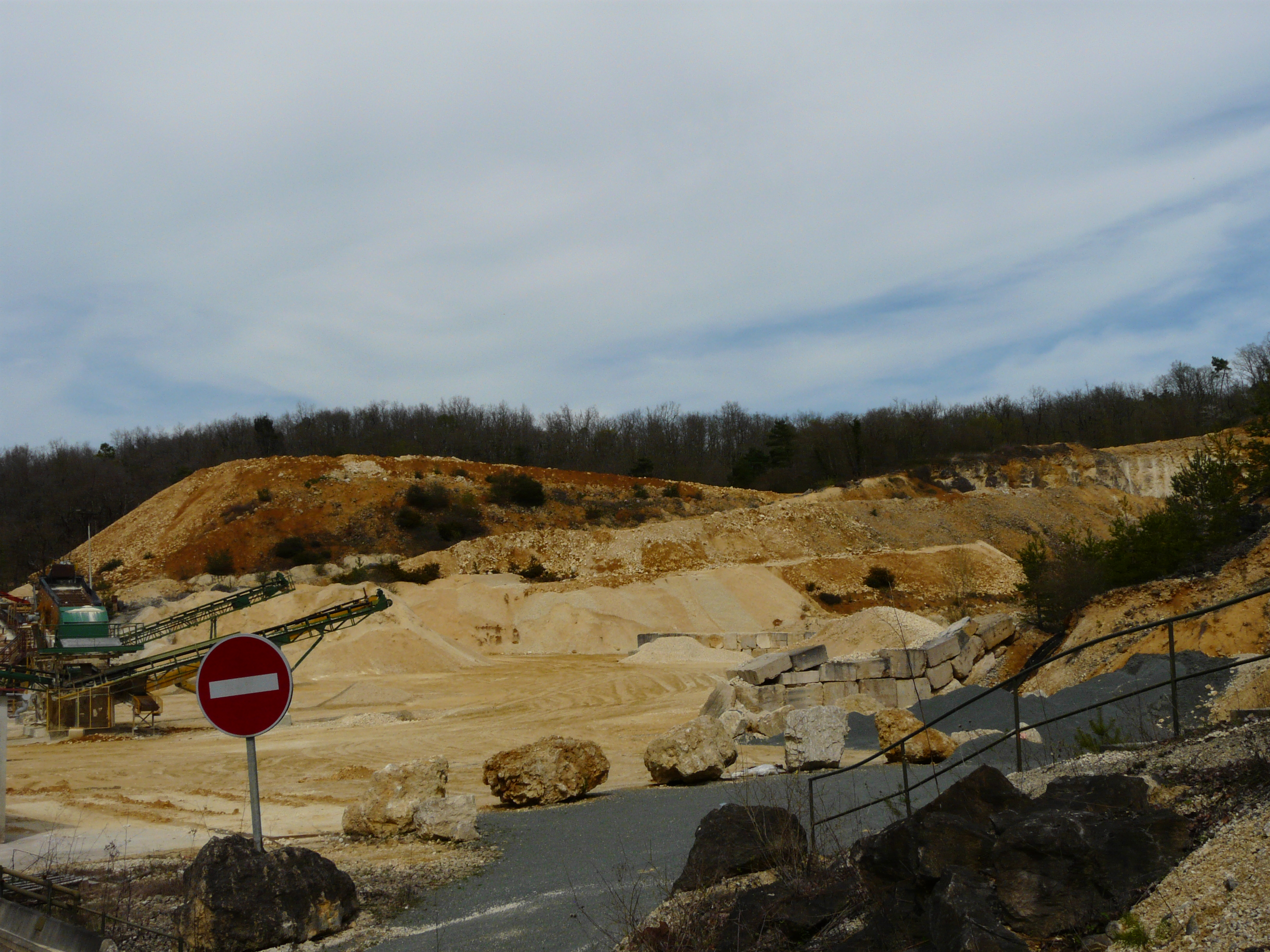
Calcium carbonate mine in Chauffour et Puy Pelan

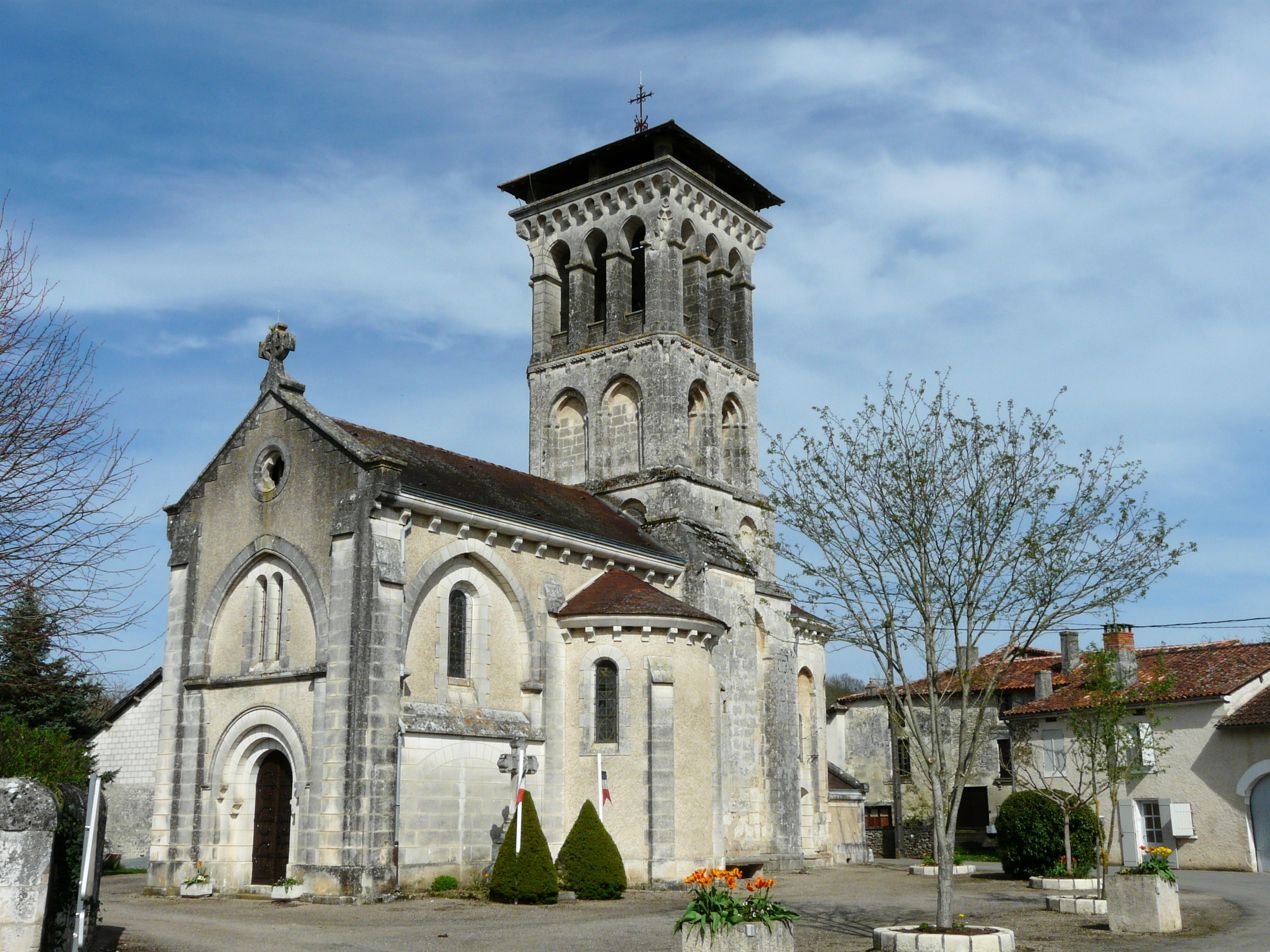
Saint-Barthélemy church

== See also ==
- Communes of the Dordogne department
