= Quinsac, Dordogne =

Quinsac
- Commune
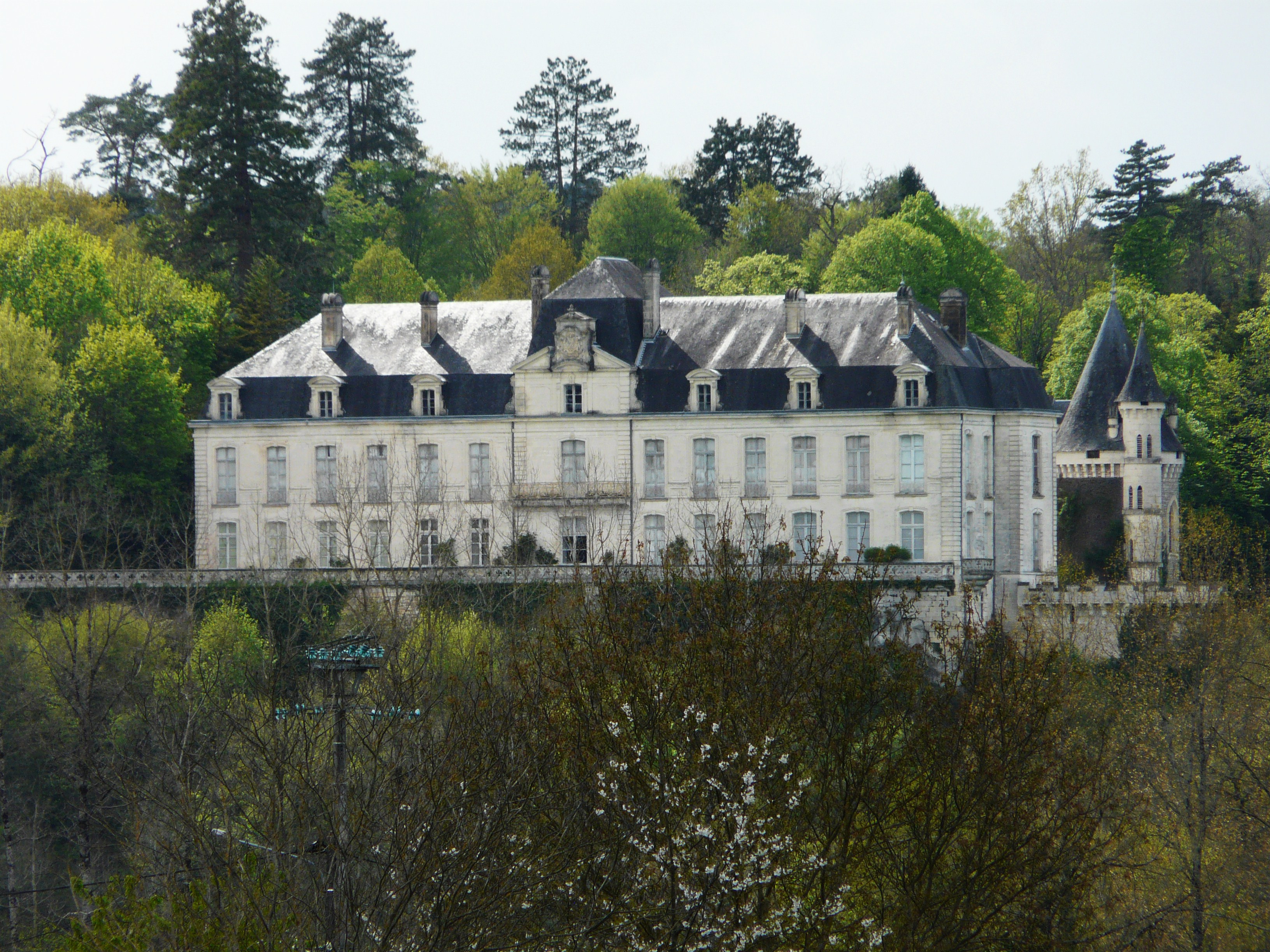
- Chateau of Vaugoubert
- Location of Quinsac
- Location within France Location within Nouvelle-Aquitaine
- Coordinates: 45°25′49″N 0°42′23″E
- Country: France
- Region: Nouvelle-Aquitaine
- Department: Dordogne
- Arrondissement: Nontron
- Canton: Brantôme en Périgord

Government
  - Mayor (2020–2026): Michel Dubreuil
- Area^{1}: 17.37 km^{2} (6.71 sq mi)
- Elevation: 120 m (390 ft)
- Highest elevation: 230 m (750 ft)
- Lowest elevation: 115 m (377 ft)
- Population (2023): 381
  - Density: 21.9/km^{2} (56.8/sq mi)
- Time zone: UTC+01:00 (CET)
  - Summer (DST): UTC+02:00 (CEST)
- INSEE/Postal code: 24346 /24530
- ^{1} French Land Register data, which excludes lakes, ponds, glaciers > 1 km^{2} (0.386 sq mi or 247 acres) and river estuaries.

Quinsac (French pronunciation: [kɛ̃sak]; Occitan: Quinçac) is a commune in the Dordogne department in Nouvelle-Aquitaine in southwestern France.

== Population ==
Historical population
Year	Pop.	±% p.a.
1968	391	—
1975	427	+1.27%
1982	450	+0.75%
1990	421	−0.83%
1999	425	+0.11%
2007	382	−1.32%
2012	394	+0.62%
2017	362	−1.68%
2023	381	+0.86%
Source: INSEE

== See also ==
- Communes of the Dordogne department
- Château de Vaugoubert
