= Montagrier =

- Commune
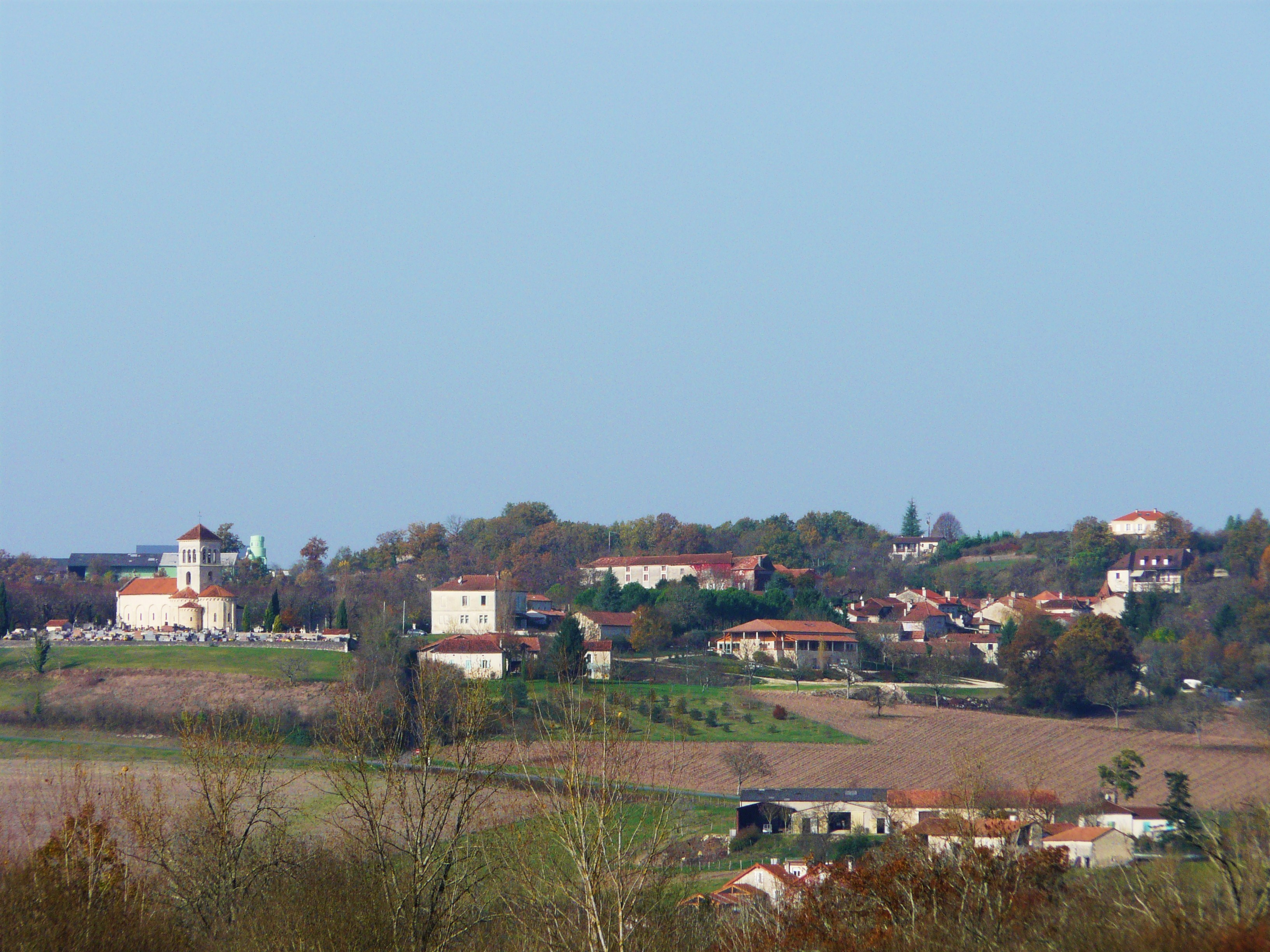
- A general view of Montagrier

- Coat of arms
- Location of Montagrier
- Location within France Location within Nouvelle-Aquitaine
- Coordinates: 45°16′17″N 0°28′39″E
- Country: France
- Region: Nouvelle-Aquitaine
- Department: Dordogne
- Arrondissement: Périgueux
- Canton: Brantôme en Périgord

Government
  - Mayor (2020–2026): Francis Lafaye
- Area^{1}: 14.04 km^{2} (5.42 sq mi)
- Elevation: 110 m (360 ft)
- Highest elevation: 207 m (679 ft)
- Lowest elevation: 68 m (223 ft)
- Population (2023): 511
  - Density: 36.4/km^{2} (94.3/sq mi)
- Time zone: UTC+01:00 (CET)
  - Summer (DST): UTC+02:00 (CEST)
- INSEE/Postal code: 24286 /24350
- ^{1} French Land Register data, which excludes lakes, ponds, glaciers > 1 km^{2} (0.386 sq mi or 247 acres) and river estuaries.

Montagrier (French pronunciation: [mɔ̃taɡʁije]) is a commune in the Dordogne department in Nouvelle-Aquitaine in southwestern France.

== Population ==
Historical population
Year	Pop.	±% p.a.
1968	411	—
1975	389	−0.78%
1982	385	−0.15%
1990	397	+0.38%
1999	443	+1.23%
2007	508	+1.73%
2012	507	−0.04%
2017	516	+0.35%
2023	511	−0.16%
Source: INSEE

== Sights ==
The Romanesque church was formerly a priory church. It contains a tenth-century inscription on a plaque, and the precincts now form a pleasant small park. Little remains of the walls which once surrounded the village. Unusually, for such a small place, Montagrier also has two chapels. Services are still held at Saint Sicaire, on the opposite end of the village from the church. There is also a tiny former chapel next to the auberge which is now used as an information centre. It is opposite the site of the castle (of which only the ruins of the stables remain). The chapel may have served the castle in the Middle Ages. During the Hundred Years War, the castle was in the possession of the Montagus, then resident in England.

== See also ==
- Communes of the Dordogne department
