= Tocane-Saint-Apre =

- Commune
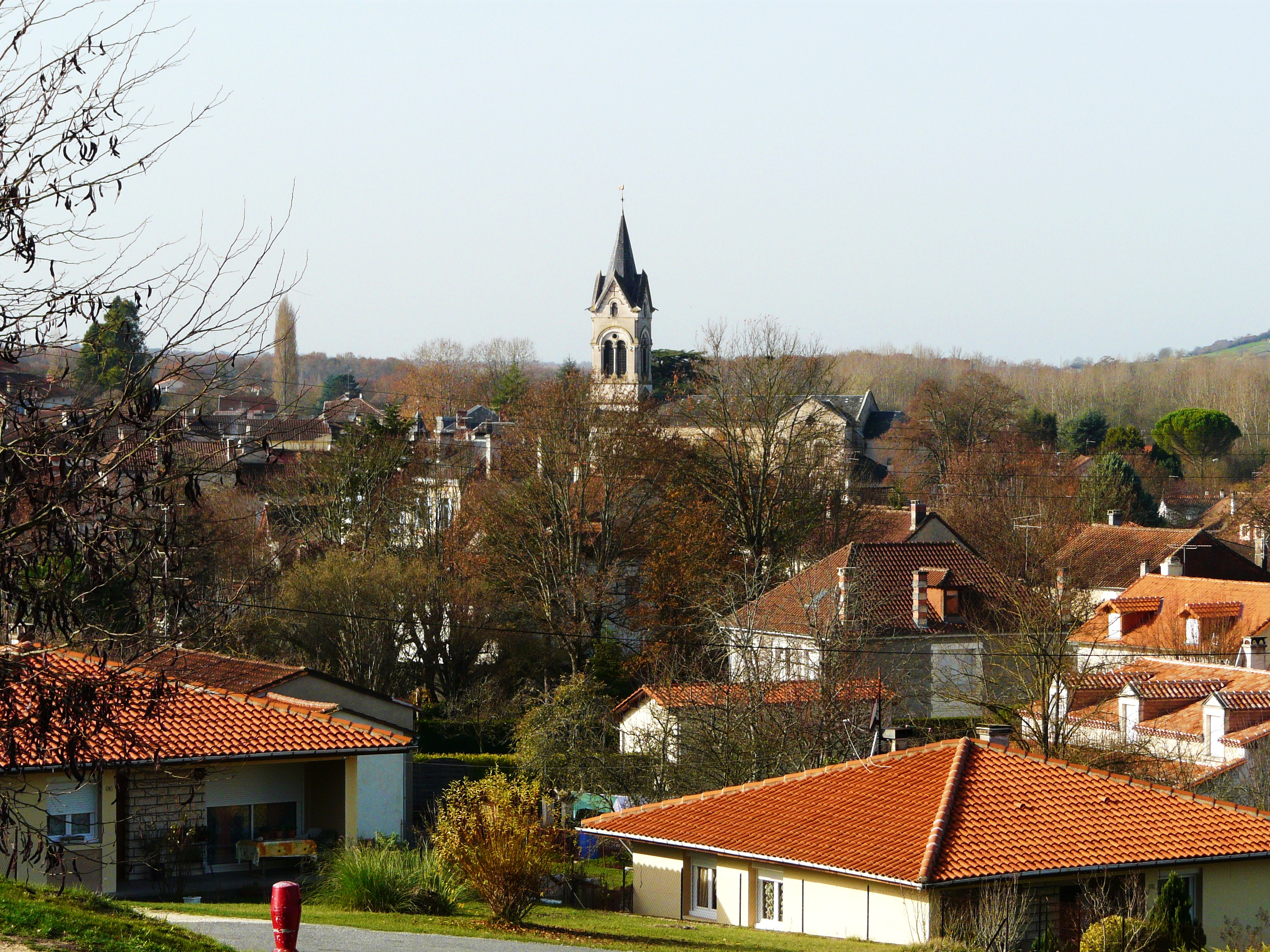
- A general view of Tocane
- Location of Tocane-Saint-Apre
- Location within France Location within Nouvelle-Aquitaine
- Coordinates: 45°15′19″N 0°29′50″E
- Country: France
- Region: Nouvelle-Aquitaine
- Department: Dordogne
- Arrondissement: Périgueux
- Canton: Brantôme en Périgord

Government
  - Mayor (2020–2026): Pierre Janaillac
- Area^{1}: 32.35 km^{2} (12.49 sq mi)
- Elevation: 85 m (279 ft)
- Highest elevation: 232 m (761 ft)
- Lowest elevation: 68 m (223 ft)
- Population (2023): 1,742
  - Density: 53.85/km^{2} (139.5/sq mi)
- Time zone: UTC+01:00 (CET)
  - Summer (DST): UTC+02:00 (CEST)
- INSEE/Postal code: 24553 /24350
- ^{1} French Land Register data, which excludes lakes, ponds, glaciers > 1 km^{2} (0.386 sq mi or 247 acres) and river estuaries.

Tocane-Saint-Apre (French pronunciation: [tɔkan sɛ̃.t‿apʁ]; Occitan: Sent Abre) is a commune in the Dordogne department of Nouvelle-Aquitaine in southwestern France.

== Population ==
Historical population
Year	Pop.	±% p.a.
1968	1,359	—
1975	1,318	−0.44%
1982	1,376	+0.62%
1990	1,377	+0.01%
1999	1,484	+0.83%
2007	1,587	+0.84%
2012	1,677	+1.11%
2017	1,691	+0.17%
2023	1,742	+0.50%
Source: INSEE

== See also ==
- Communes of the Dordogne department
- Château de Beauséjour (Tocane-Saint-Apre)
