= Château de la Valade (Bourdeilles) =

Château in Nouvelle-Aquitaine, France

- Bourdeilles in France
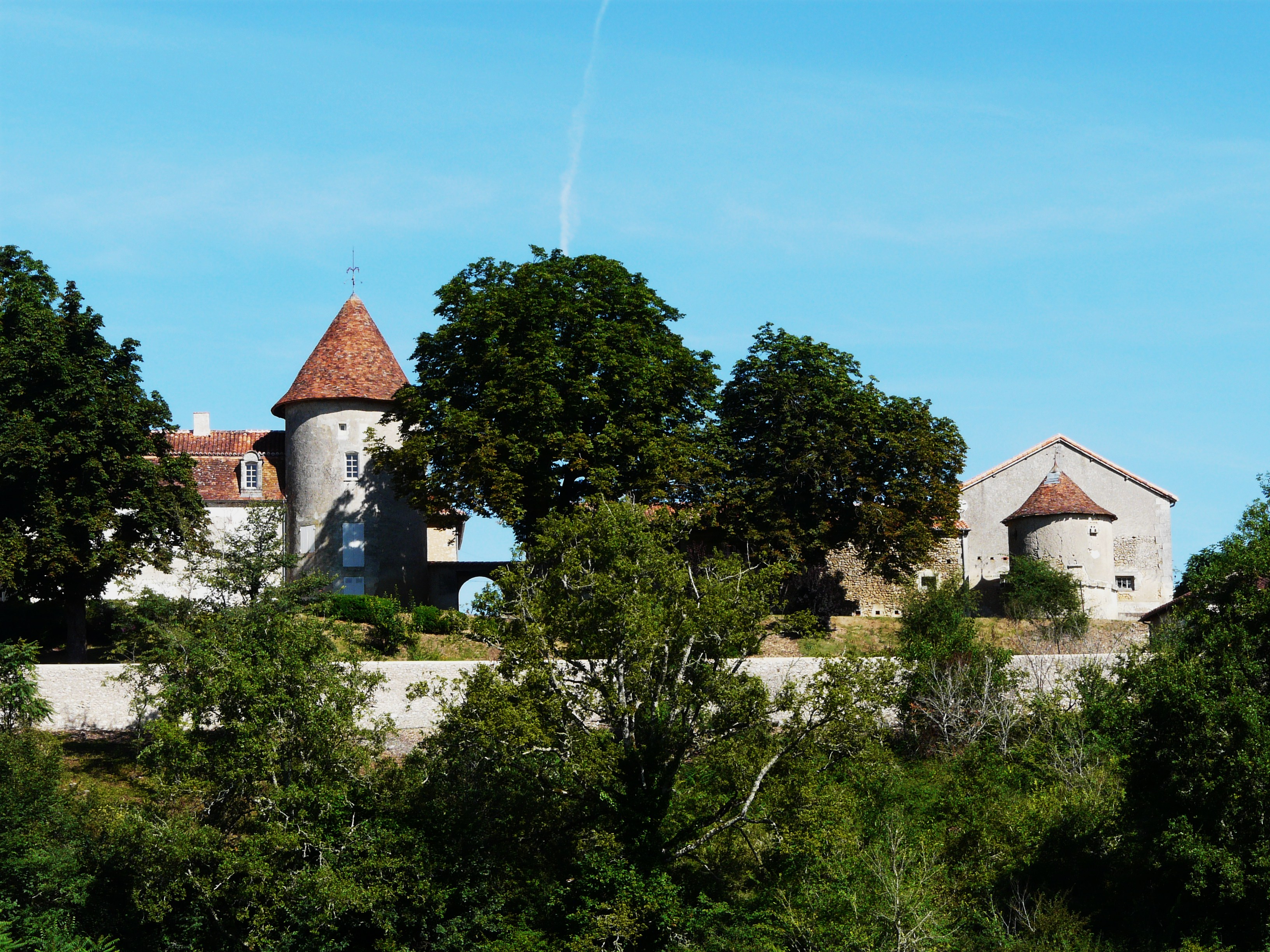

Site information
- Owner: Privé

Location
- Coordinates: 45°17′29″N 0°34′19″E

Site history
- Built: 17th century

Château de la Valade is a château in Bourdeilles, Dordogne, Nouvelle-Aquitaine, France. Based on an older structure, the current building dates from the 18th century.
