= Saint-Victor, Dordogne =

Saint-Victor
- Commune
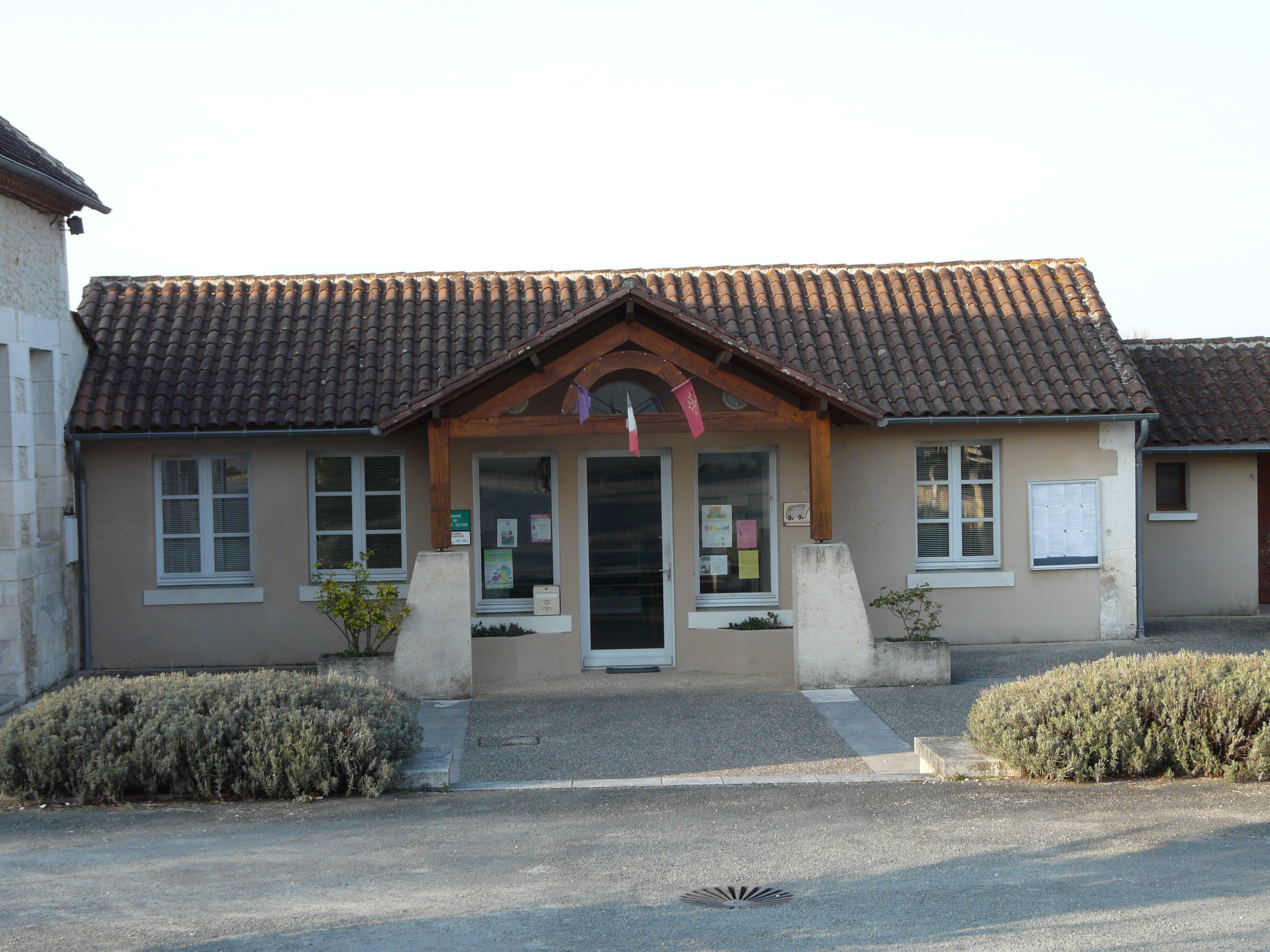
- The town hall in Saint-Victor
- Location of Saint-Victor
- Location within France Location within Nouvelle-Aquitaine
- Coordinates: 45°15′52″N 0°26′21″E
- Country: France
- Region: Nouvelle-Aquitaine
- Department: Dordogne
- Arrondissement: Périgueux
- Canton: Brantôme en Périgord

Government
  - Mayor (2020–2026): Priça Mortier
- Area^{1}: 5.12 km^{2} (1.98 sq mi)
- Elevation: 135 m (443 ft)
- Highest elevation: 167 m (548 ft)
- Lowest elevation: 63 m (207 ft)
- Population (2023): 213
  - Density: 41.6/km^{2} (108/sq mi)
- Time zone: UTC+01:00 (CET)
  - Summer (DST): UTC+02:00 (CEST)
- INSEE/Postal code: 24508 /24350
- ^{1} French Land Register data, which excludes lakes, ponds, glaciers > 1 km^{2} (0.386 sq mi or 247 acres) and river estuaries.

Saint-Victor (French pronunciation: [sɛ̃ viktɔʁ]; Limousin: Sent Victor) is a commune in the Dordogne department in Nouvelle-Aquitaine in southwestern France.

== Population ==
Historical population
Year	Pop.	±% p.a.
1968	145	—
1975	137	−0.81%
1982	124	−1.41%
1990	134	+0.97%
1999	157	+1.78%
2007	196	+2.81%
2012	211	+1.49%
2017	203	−0.77%
2023	213	+0.80%
Source: INSEE

== See also ==
- Communes of the Dordogne department
