= Saint-Just, Dordogne =

Saint-Just
- Commune
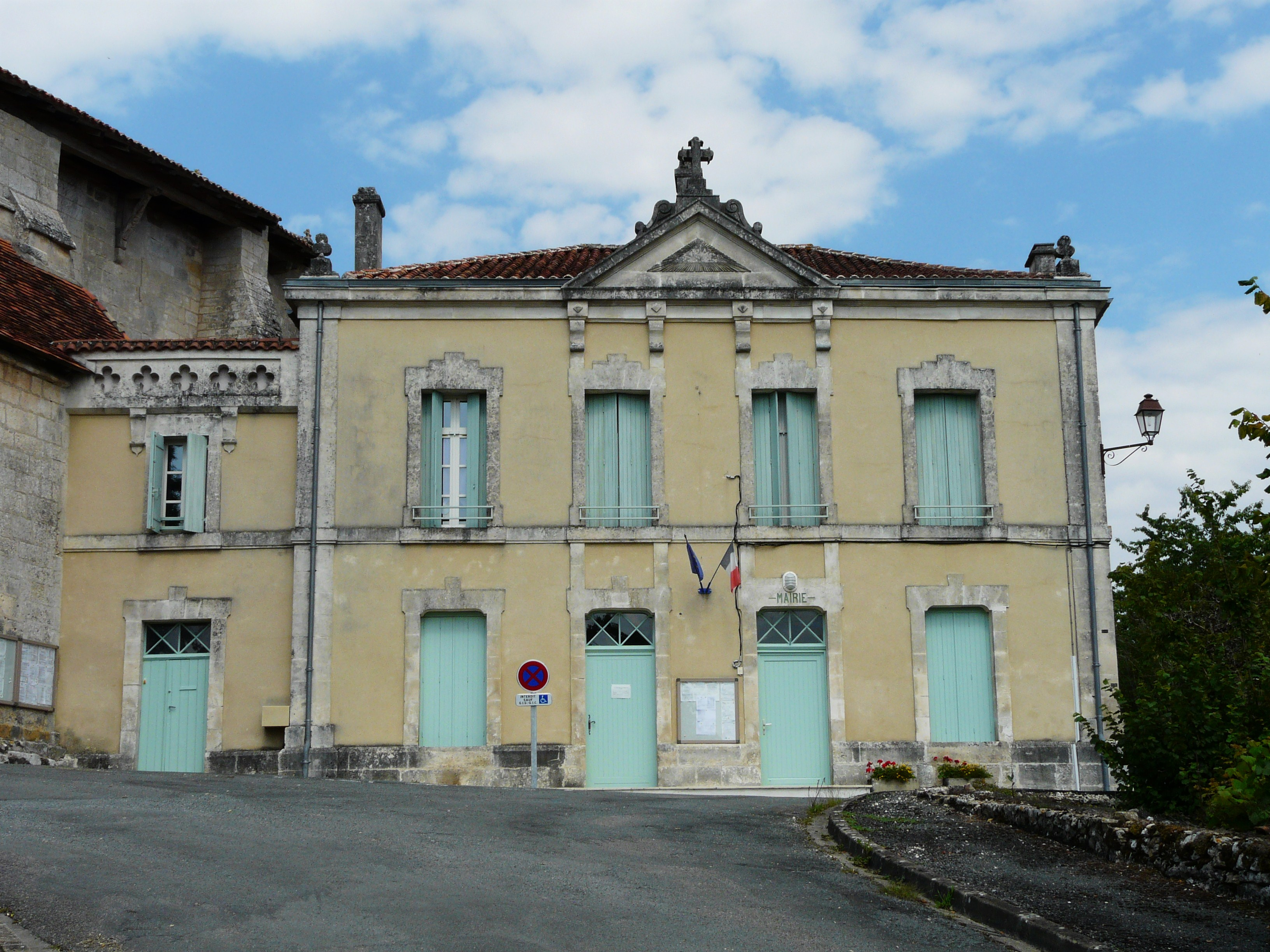
- The town hall in Saint-Just
- Location of Saint-Just
- Location within France Location within Nouvelle-Aquitaine
- Coordinates: 45°20′10″N 0°30′30″E
- Country: France
- Region: Nouvelle-Aquitaine
- Department: Dordogne
- Arrondissement: Périgueux
- Canton: Brantôme en Périgord
- Intercommunality: Périgord Ribéracois

Government
  - Mayor (2020–2026): Francis Duverneuil
- Area^{1}: 11.2 km^{2} (4.3 sq mi)
- Elevation: 96 m (315 ft)
- Highest elevation: 178 m (584 ft)
- Lowest elevation: 94 m (308 ft)
- Population (2023): 142
  - Density: 12.7/km^{2} (32.8/sq mi)
- Time zone: UTC+01:00 (CET)
  - Summer (DST): UTC+02:00 (CEST)
- INSEE/Postal code: 24434 /24320
- ^{1} French Land Register data, which excludes lakes, ponds, glaciers > 1 km^{2} (0.386 sq mi or 247 acres) and river estuaries.

Saint-Just (French pronunciation: [sɛ̃ ʒyst]; Limousin: Sent Just) is a commune in the Dordogne department in Nouvelle-Aquitaine in southwestern France.

== Population ==
Historical population
Year	Pop.	±% p.a.
1968	207	—
1975	194	−0.92%
1982	175	−1.46%
1990	138	−2.93%
1999	139	+0.08%
2007	132	−0.64%
2012	125	−1.08%
2017	136	+1.70%
2023	142	+0.72%
Source: INSEE

== See also ==
- Communes of the Dordogne department
