= Douchapt =

- Commune
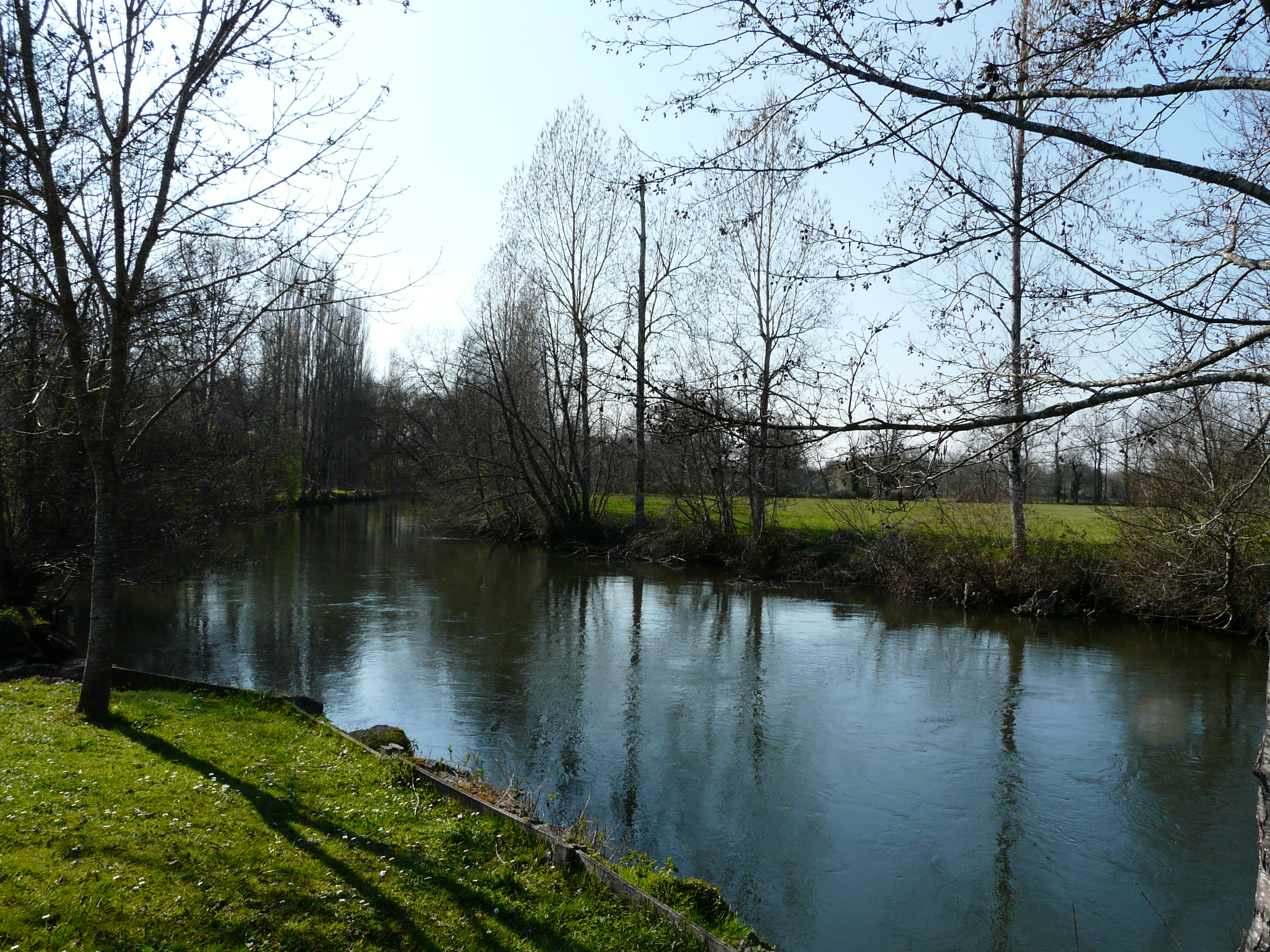
- The Dronne river in Douchapt
- Location of Douchapt
- Location within France Location within Nouvelle-Aquitaine
- Coordinates: 45°14′37″N 0°26′39″E
- Country: France
- Region: Nouvelle-Aquitaine
- Department: Dordogne
- Arrondissement: Périgueux
- Canton: Brantôme en Périgord
- Intercommunality: Périgord Ribéracois

Government
  - Mayor (2020–2026): Yves Mahaud
- Area^{1}: 8.68 km^{2} (3.35 sq mi)
- Elevation: 90 m (300 ft)
- Highest elevation: 204 m (669 ft)
- Lowest elevation: 66 m (217 ft)
- Population (2023): 353
  - Density: 40.7/km^{2} (105/sq mi)
- Time zone: UTC+01:00 (CET)
  - Summer (DST): UTC+02:00 (CEST)
- INSEE/Postal code: 24154 /24350
- ^{1} French Land Register data, which excludes lakes, ponds, glaciers > 1 km^{2} (0.386 sq mi or 247 acres) and river estuaries.

Douchapt is a commune in the Dordogne department in Nouvelle-Aquitaine in southwestern France.

== Population ==
Historical population
Year	Pop.	±% p.a.
1968	297	—
1975	253	−2.26%
1982	260	+0.39%
1990	240	−1.00%
1999	251	+0.50%
2007	280	+1.38%
2012	330	+3.34%
2017	359	+1.70%
2023	353	−0.28%
Source: INSEE

== See also ==
- Communes of the Dordogne department
