= Château de Segonzac =

Château in Nouvelle-Aquitaine, France

Coordinates: 45°12′16″N 0°26′01″E

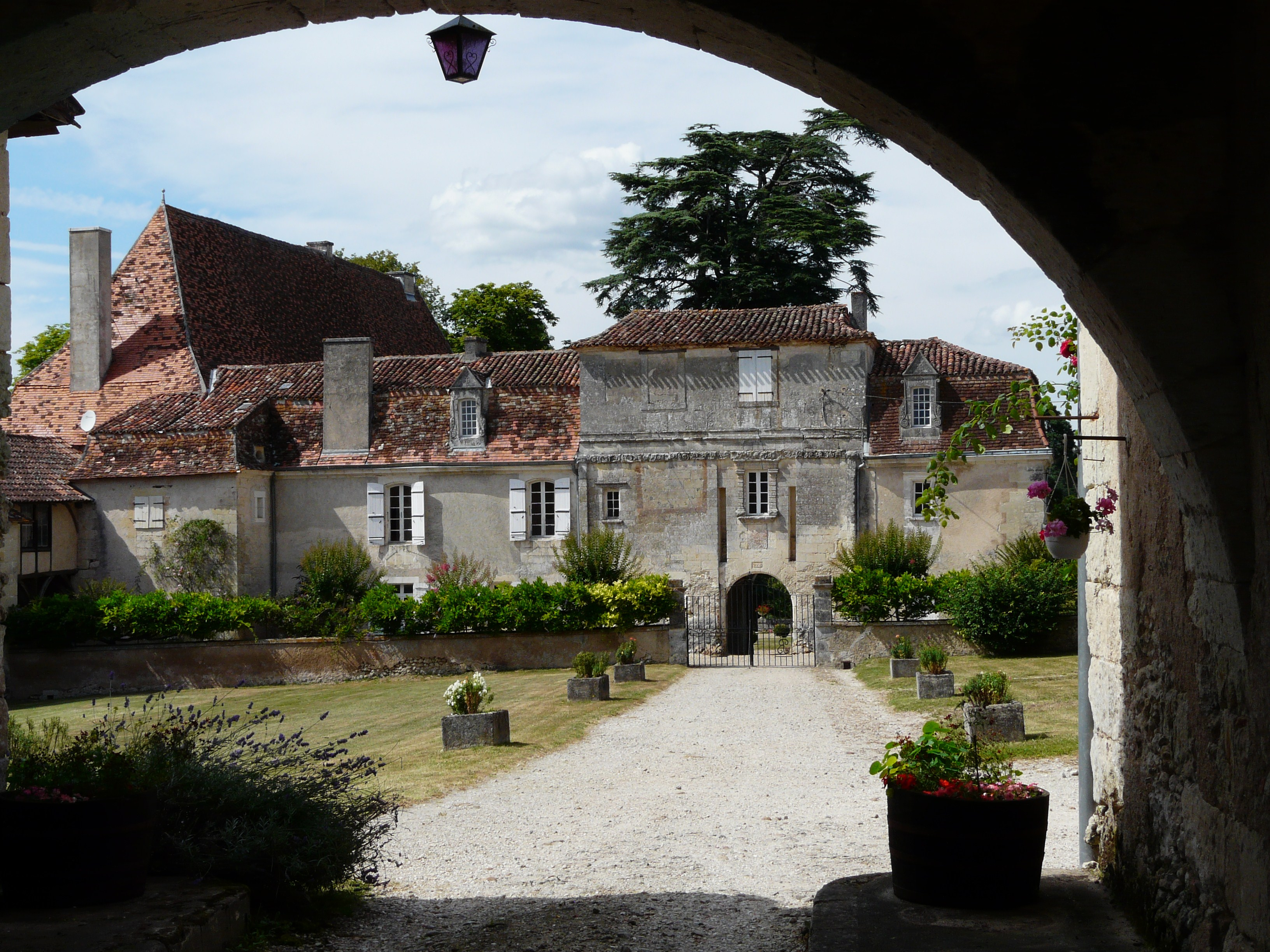
Château de Segonzac

The Château de Segonzac is a château in Segonzac, Dordogne, Nouvelle-Aquitaine, France.
