= Saint-Pancrace, Dordogne =

Saint-Pancrace
- Commune
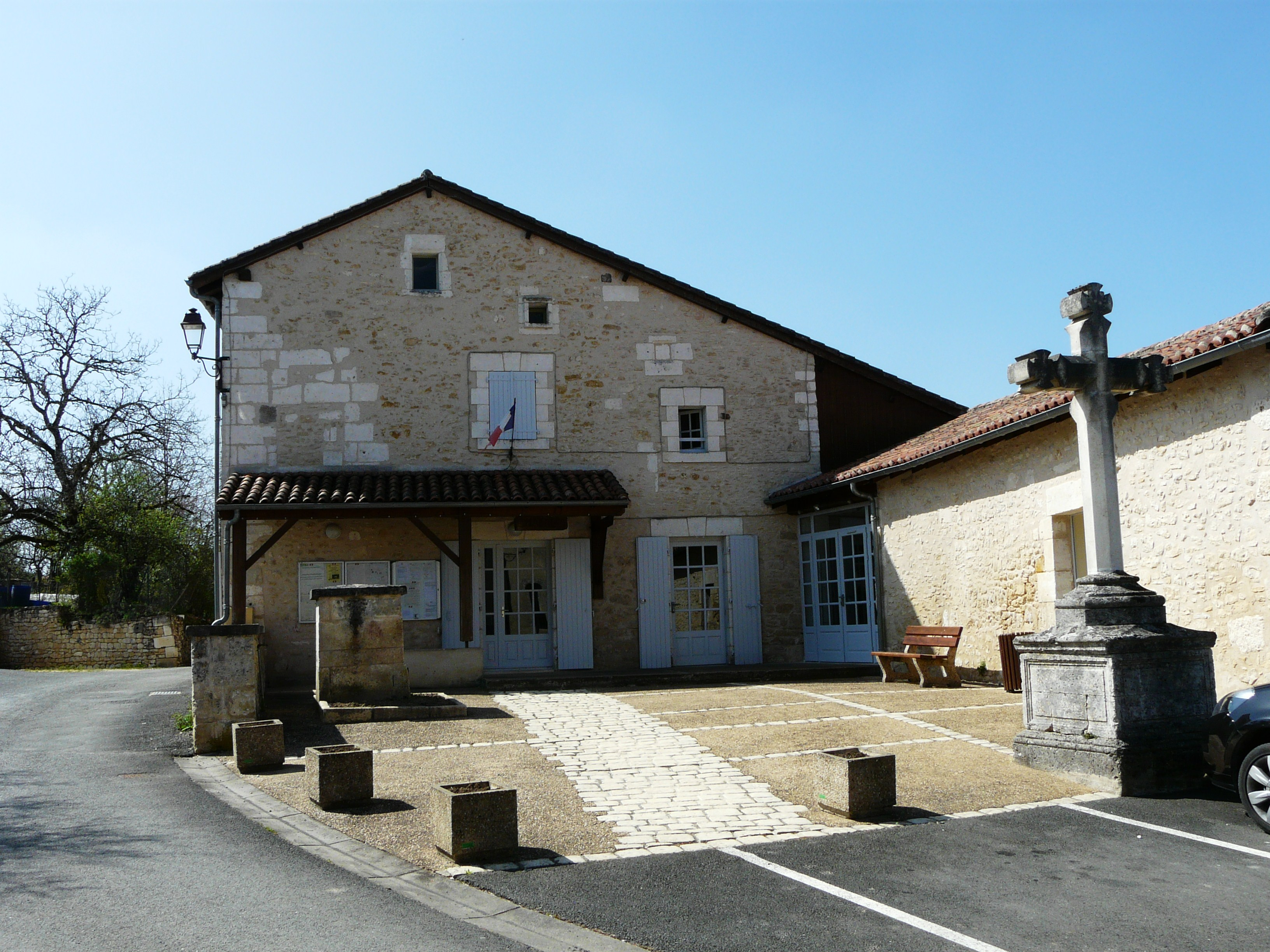
- The town hall in Saint-Pancrace
- Location of Saint-Pancrace
- Location within France Location within Nouvelle-Aquitaine
- Coordinates: 45°25′43″N 0°39′55″E
- Country: France
- Region: Nouvelle-Aquitaine
- Department: Dordogne
- Arrondissement: Nontron
- Canton: Brantôme en Périgord

Government
  - Mayor (2020–2026): Jean-Jacques Martinot
- Area^{1}: 6.69 km^{2} (2.58 sq mi)
- Elevation: 160 m (520 ft)
- Highest elevation: 233 m (764 ft)
- Lowest elevation: 136 m (446 ft)
- Population (2023): 144
  - Density: 21.5/km^{2} (55.7/sq mi)
- Time zone: UTC+01:00 (CET)
  - Summer (DST): UTC+02:00 (CEST)
- INSEE/Postal code: 24474 /24530
- ^{1} French Land Register data, which excludes lakes, ponds, glaciers > 1 km^{2} (0.386 sq mi or 247 acres) and river estuaries.

Saint-Pancrace (French pronunciation: [sɛ̃ pɑ̃kʁas]; Occitan: Sent Pancraci) is a commune in the Dordogne department in Nouvelle-Aquitaine in southwestern France.

== Population ==
Historical population
Year	Pop.	±% p.a.
1968	150	—
1975	155	+0.47%
1982	144	−1.05%
1990	129	−1.37%
1999	120	−0.80%
2007	160	+3.66%
2012	154	−0.76%
2017	187	+3.96%
2023	144	−4.26%
Source: INSEE

== See also ==
- Communes of the Dordogne department
