= Gérard Devouassoux =

French mountaineer (1940–1974)

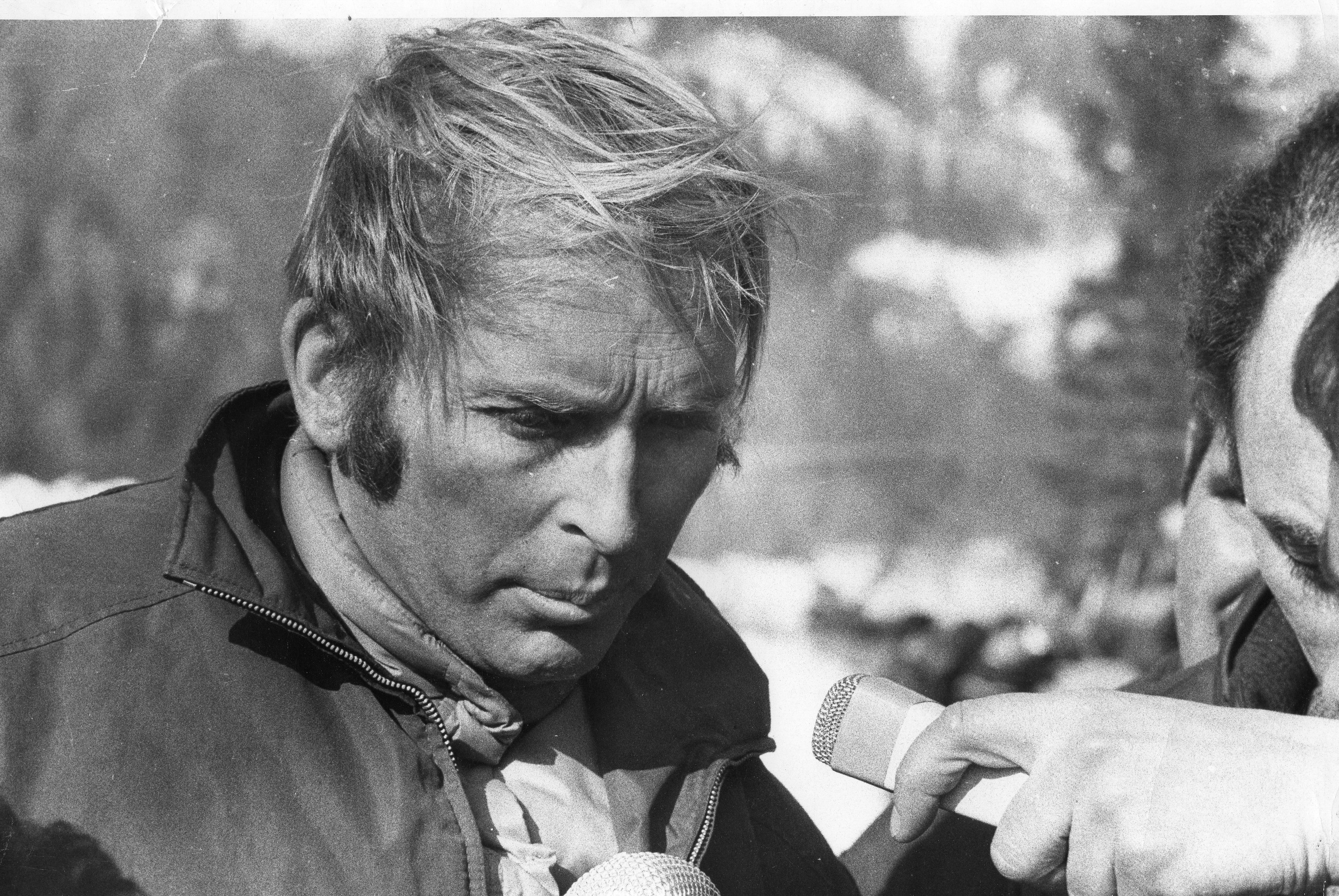
- Devouassoux during the rescue of René Desmaison at Grandes Jorasses in 1971

Personal information
- Full name: Gérard Devouassoux
- Nationality: French
- Born: 5 June 1940 Sallanches, France
- Died: 9 September 1974 (aged 34) Mount Everest

Gérard Devouassoux (born 5 June 1940 in Sallanches; died 9 September 1974 on Mount Everest) was a French mountaineer and mountain guide. He came from a family of skiers through his aunts and his uncle, the Thiolières, all members of French teams.

== Biography ==
=== Early years and attainment of guide status ===
Gérard Devouassoux discovered mountaineering at the age of 19 while preparing for Arts et Métiers and, in 1960, took the mountain guide course where he joined a rope team with Charles Bozon, the world champion in skiing (who disappeared with thirteen other climbers in an avalanche on the Aiguille Verte on 7 July 1964). In 1961, he broke his pelvis on the Bossons Glacier while doing his military service at the École militaire de haute montagne (EMHM). Although declared an "invalid" and holder of a priority card on public transport, Devouassoux nevertheless returned to Grandes Jorasses in 1962 and made it in thirteen hours, with Yvon Masino (1940–1982), the fastest ascent of Walker Spur to date. On 1 February 1963, Devouassoux, with René Desmaison and climber Jacques Batkin, made their first winter attempt on the north face of the Grandes Jorasses. On the way, the climb was cancelled due to a storm: they did not attempt it again. On 18 June 1963, Devouassoux entered the École nationale des sports de montagne (National School of Ski and Mountaineering, ENSA) for an internship as a guide. Graduating first, he received his medal and became a member of the Compagnie des Guides de Chamonix.

=== Improvement of mountain rescue ===
In parallel with his job and the management of the ski school, Devouassoux became an expert in high mountain rescue. In this self-imposed duty, he was helped by Jean-Jacques Mollaret, a gendarmerie officer who then set up the first platoon of high mountain gendarmerie (PGHM). Thus, on 20 August 1966, Devouassoux, alongside Yves Pollet-Villard, Christian Mollier and Yvon Masino, went to the rescue of two stranded German mountaineers: Heinz Schriddel and Hermann Ramisch. However, on the west face, two roped parties, led by René Desmaison and Gary Hemming, "the beatnik of the peaks", were already engaged in the same rescue as freelancers. The Devouassoux team arrived at the level of the ledge where the Germans were blocked. Pollet-Villard suggested to Desmaison and Hemming that they install a fixed rope. It should make it possible to repatriate the "castaways" to the north face, where the descent to Chamonix is the easiest and quickest. The rescuers on the west face refused to allow the transfer to the north face. During the same episode Egle, a young German mountaineer who was a friend of Ramisch and Schriddel, died, presumably of exhaustion. Back in Chamonix, Devouassoux believed that the "westerly" roped parties, with René Desmaison as guide, put the two survivors in danger by choosing the longest and most perilous descent. It was then that a lasting enmity arose between the two guides. The photographs taken by the Desmaison team made the front page of Paris Match.

On 25 February 1971, René Desmaison, stranded with his companion Serge Gousseault on the north face of Jorasses, was rescued by Gérard Devouassoux, but Gousseault was already dead. Between 11 February, when the team led by Desmaison began its attempt, and 25 February, the day of its return to Chamonix, the guide survived fourteen days on the north face of the Grandes Jorasses. Also in 1971, Gérard Devouassoux was elected first deputy mayor of Chamonix, under Maurice Herzog. Shocked by the increase in mountain accidents, Pierre Mazeaud, a prominent mountaineer and politician, proposed the idea of creating a "mountain permit" that one would have to hold to practice mountaineering. Devouassoux was opposed to this principle and, choosing pedagogy, founded the Office de haute montagne. In the premises of a former monastic dwelling, he installed mountain guides capable of giving free advice. A set of maps, plans and "topos" are also available to climbers, as well as weather forecasts. Soon enough, some Chamonix guides saw this office as a tool for competition, and it was threatened with closure. Gérard Devouassoux went to Paris, to the Ministry of the Interior, where he defended "his" office and found sources of national funding. He won his case and the Agency's civilian guides were subsequently replaced by military graduates.

=== Annapurna and the fatal attempt on Everest ===
In 1971, Devouassoux made the first ascent of southern Annapurna (7,219 metres (23,684 ft)) with Georges Payot, Yvon Masino and Maurice Gicquel.

Three years later, in 1974, disappointed and surprised that, twenty years after the conquest of Everest by the New Zealander Edmund Hillary, no Frenchman had ever gone to the summit, he set up his own expedition, composed exclusively of guides from Chamonix. The goal was to make the first complete climb of the west ridge of the highest peak in the world, and without oxygen. On the night of 9 to 10 September 1974, while Devouassoux was sleeping at Camp II at an altitude of 6,900 metres (22,600 ft), a huge avalanche swept through a large couloir under the ridge. The blast of the latter triggered secondary flows that were fatal to Gérard Devouassoux and five Sherpas whose tents were precipitated into the void. It was not until 1999, twenty-five years later, that the Compagnie des guides de Chamonix dedicated its annual medal of honour to the memory of Gérard Devouassoux.

== Climbs ==
- 1960 : north face of Petit Dru (3,730 metres (12,240 ft)).
- 1960 : first ascent of the central spur of the Rochers du Parquet (2,024 metres (6,640 ft), Vercors Massif) with Christian Mollier and Marc Martinetti.
- 1962 : Walker Spur with Yvon Masino.
- 1964 : first winter ascent of the north face of Petit Dru with Georges Payot and Yvon Masino.
- 1971 : first ascent of southern Annapurna (7,219 metres (23,684 ft)) with Georges Payot, Yvon Masino and Maurice Gicquel.

== Bibliography ==
- Bourget, Jacques (1975). Gérard Devouassoux le souffle de la montagne [Gérard Devouassoux, the breath of the mountain] (in French). éditions Solar. ASIN B0014MJJ1O.
- Desmaison, René (2010). 342 heures dans les Grandes Jorasses [342 hours on Grandes Jorasses] (in French). Hoëbeke. ISBN 9782842303808.
- Mollier, Christian (1975). Éverest 74, le rendez vous du ciel [Everest 74, appointment in the sky]. L'aventure vécue (in French). Flammarion. ASIN B0000DONO0.
