= René Desmaison =

French mountain climber (1930–2007)

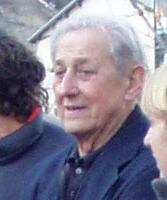
René Desmaison in 2005

René Desmaison (April 14, 1930, in Bourdeilles, Dordogne – 28 September 2007) was a veteran French mountaineer, climber and alpinist.

Desmaison had climbed more than 1,000 mountains since the 1950s. He made the first ascent of 114 previously unclimbed mountains throughout the Andes, Alps and Himalayas in his 40-year climbing career. He is also credited with creating several new winter routes in the Alps.

René Desmaison died on 28 September 2007, at La Timone Hospital in Marseille, France. He was 77 years old.
