= Bourdeilles =

- Commune
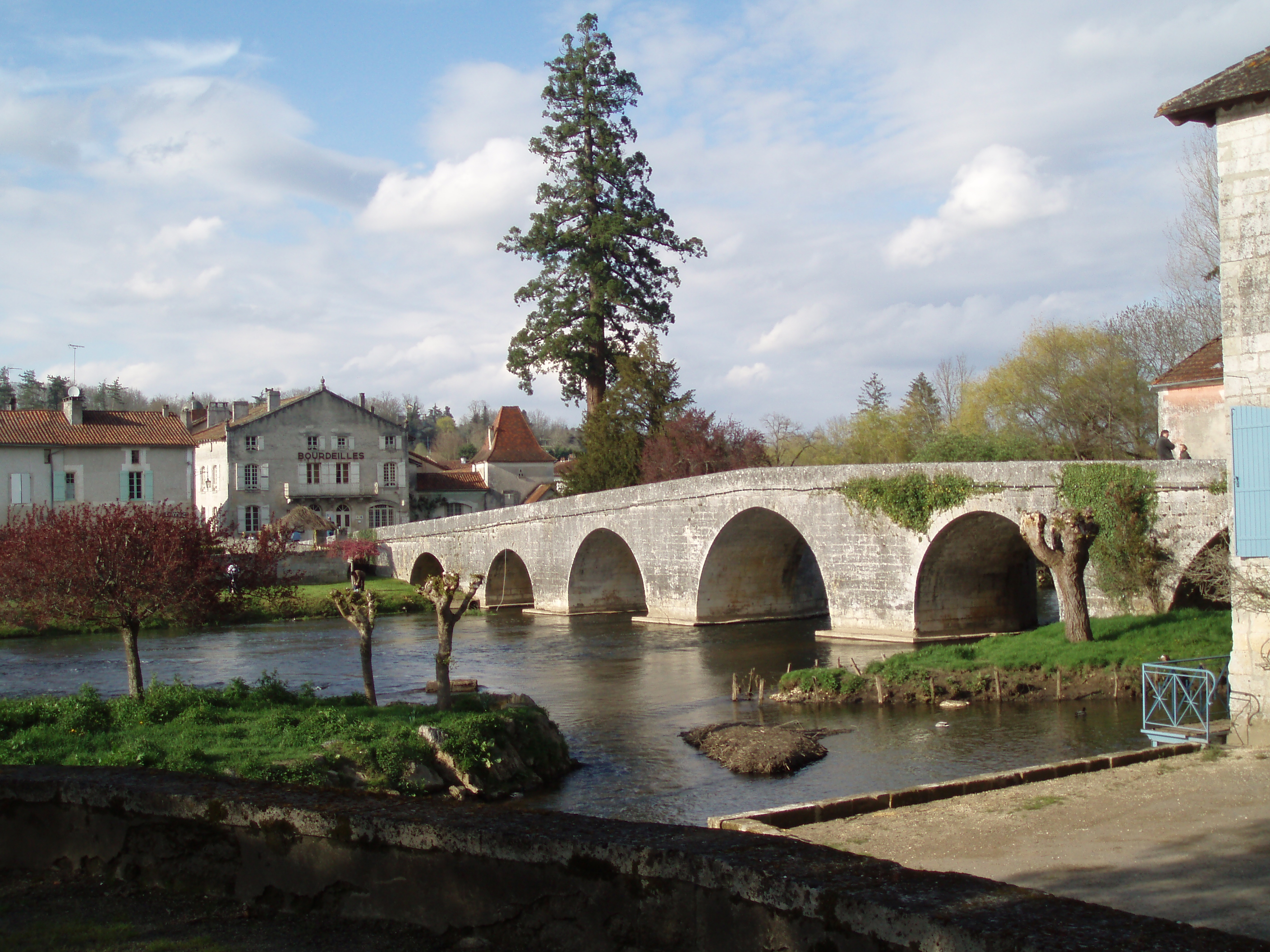
- A general view of Bourdeilles

- Coat of arms
- Location of Bourdeilles
- Location within France Location within Nouvelle-Aquitaine
- Coordinates: 45°19′22″N 0°35′16″E
- Country: France
- Region: Nouvelle-Aquitaine
- Department: Dordogne
- Arrondissement: Nontron
- Canton: Brantôme en Périgord
- Intercommunality: Dronne et Belle

Government
  - Mayor (2020–2026): Nicolas Dussutour
- Area^{1}: 21.85 km^{2} (8.44 sq mi)
- Highest elevation: 192 m (630 ft)
- Lowest elevation: 82 m (269 ft)
- Population (2023): 785
  - Density: 35.9/km^{2} (93.0/sq mi)
- Time zone: UTC+01:00 (CET)
  - Summer (DST): UTC+02:00 (CEST)
- INSEE/Postal code: 24055 /24310
- ^{1} French Land Register data, which excludes lakes, ponds, glaciers > 1 km^{2} (0.386 sq mi or 247 acres) and river estuaries.

Bourdeilles (French pronunciation: [buʁdɛj]; Occitan: Bordelha) is a commune in the Dordogne department (administrative division) in southwestern France.

== Sights ==
- The château de Bourdeilles, which is a complex consisting of a medieval part and a Renaissance style part, built in the 16th century. From 1273, the year in which Edward I of England invested the castle of Bourdeilles.
- The château de la Valade, built in the 17th to 18th century.

== Population ==
Historical population
Year	Pop.	±% p.a.
1968	721	—
1975	654	−1.38%
1982	728	+1.54%
1990	811	+1.36%
1999	777	−0.47%
2007	778	+0.02%
2012	763	−0.39%
2017	743	−0.53%
2023	785	+0.92%
Source: INSEE

== Notable residents ==
- Pierre de Bourdeille, known as Brantôme (c. 1537 - 1614), commendatory (or secular) abbot of the abbey of Brantôme and Lord of Saint-Crépin de Richemont, was a French soldier and writer, best known for his "light" writings His life as a courtier and a soldier, and that of the illustrious personages whom he met with.
- Vladimir Volkoff (1932–2005), died in his house at Bourdeilles, was a French writer, author of numerous novels relating notably to Russian history, Cold and the Algerian war, essays devoted to disinformation, but also playwright, poet, biographer and translator. His preferred language for writing was French, but he also published novels in English and texts in Russian.
- René Desmaison (1930–2007) was a French climber, born in Bourdeilles, died in Marseille.
- Iain Pattinson (1953–2021), British/Irish scriptwriter, author and broadcaster.

== See also ==
- Communes of the Dordogne département
