= Villetoureix =

- Commune
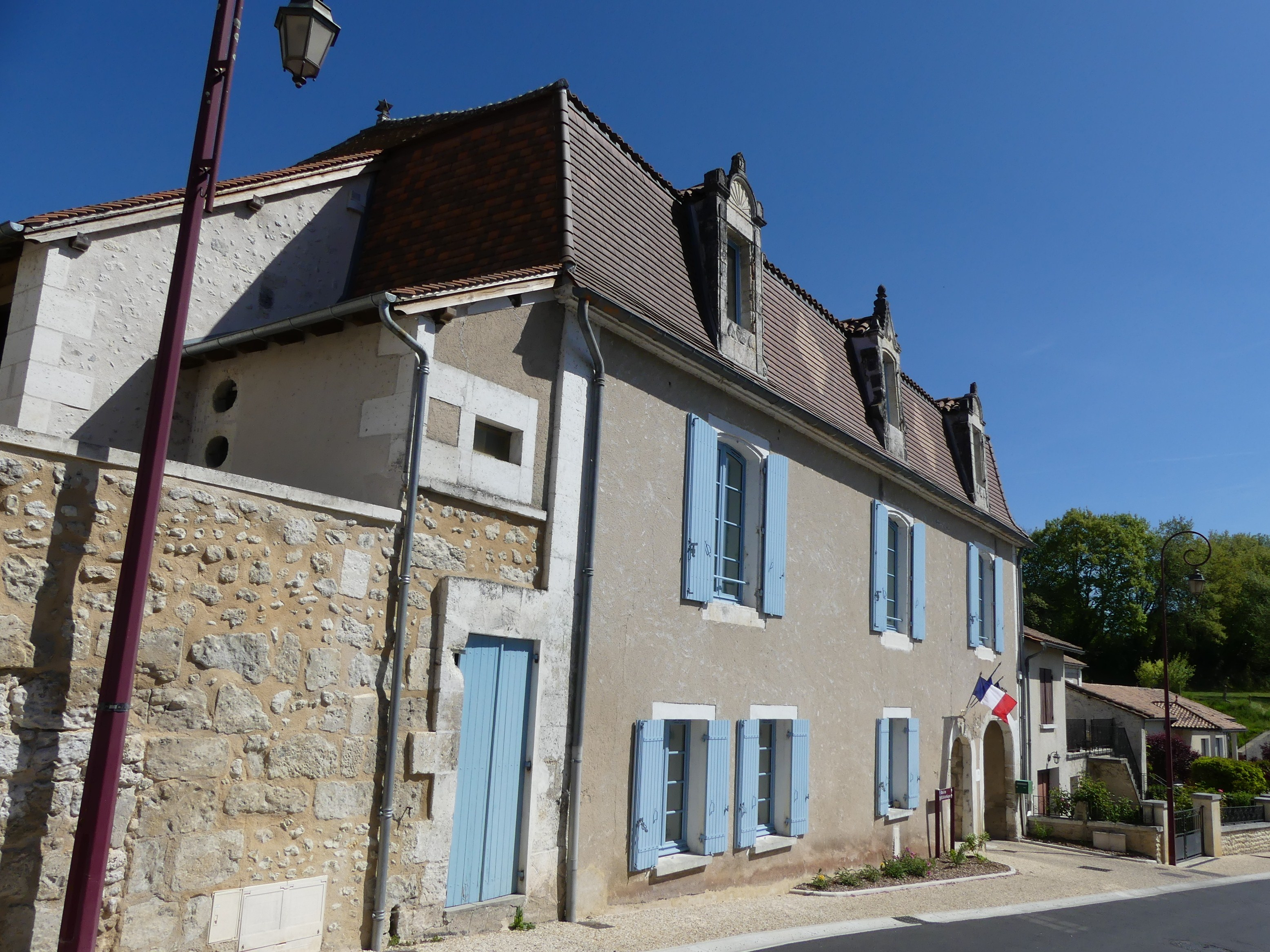
- The town hall in Villetoureix
- Location of Villetoureix
- Location within France Location within Nouvelle-Aquitaine
- Coordinates: 45°15′51″N 0°21′48″E
- Country: France
- Region: Nouvelle-Aquitaine
- Department: Dordogne
- Arrondissement: Périgueux
- Canton: Ribérac
- Intercommunality: Périgord Ribéracois

Government
  - Mayor (2020–2026): Patrick Lachaud
- Area^{1}: 16.4 km^{2} (6.3 sq mi)
- Elevation: 67 m (220 ft)
- Highest elevation: 161 m (528 ft)
- Lowest elevation: 56 m (184 ft)
- Population (2023): 891
  - Density: 54.3/km^{2} (141/sq mi)
- Time zone: UTC+01:00 (CET)
  - Summer (DST): UTC+02:00 (CEST)
- INSEE/Postal code: 24586 /24600
- ^{1} French Land Register data, which excludes lakes, ponds, glaciers > 1 km^{2} (0.386 sq mi or 247 acres) and river estuaries.

Villetoureix (French pronunciation: [viltuʁɛ]; Occitan: Vilatorrés) is a commune in the Dordogne department in Nouvelle-Aquitaine in southwestern France.

== History ==
The oldest evidence of habitation date to Roman Gaul. The first attestation of the name is in the form Villatores. The name was formed from villa (village), and torre which meant defensive building.

Development of the village started in the 1600s, when the château de la Rigale was built.

== Geography ==
Villetoureix is situated on a hill on the right bank of the river Dronne, near Ribérac, in the Périgord blanc area. The commune consists of the village Villetoureix and the minor settlements of la Pouyade, la Borie, Mayac and la Dérame. Neighbouring communes are Ribérac and Saint-Méard-de-Drône to the south, Celles to the east, Bertric-Burée to the north and Allemans to the west.

== Demographics ==
Historical population
Year	Pop.	±% p.a.
1968	677	—
1975	728	+1.04%
1982	750	+0.43%
1990	779	+0.48%
1999	762	−0.24%
2007	857	+1.48%
2012	879	+0.51%
2017	906	+0.61%
2023	891	−0.28%
Source: INSEE

== See also ==
Communes of the Dordogne department
