= Comberanche-et-Épeluche =

- Commune
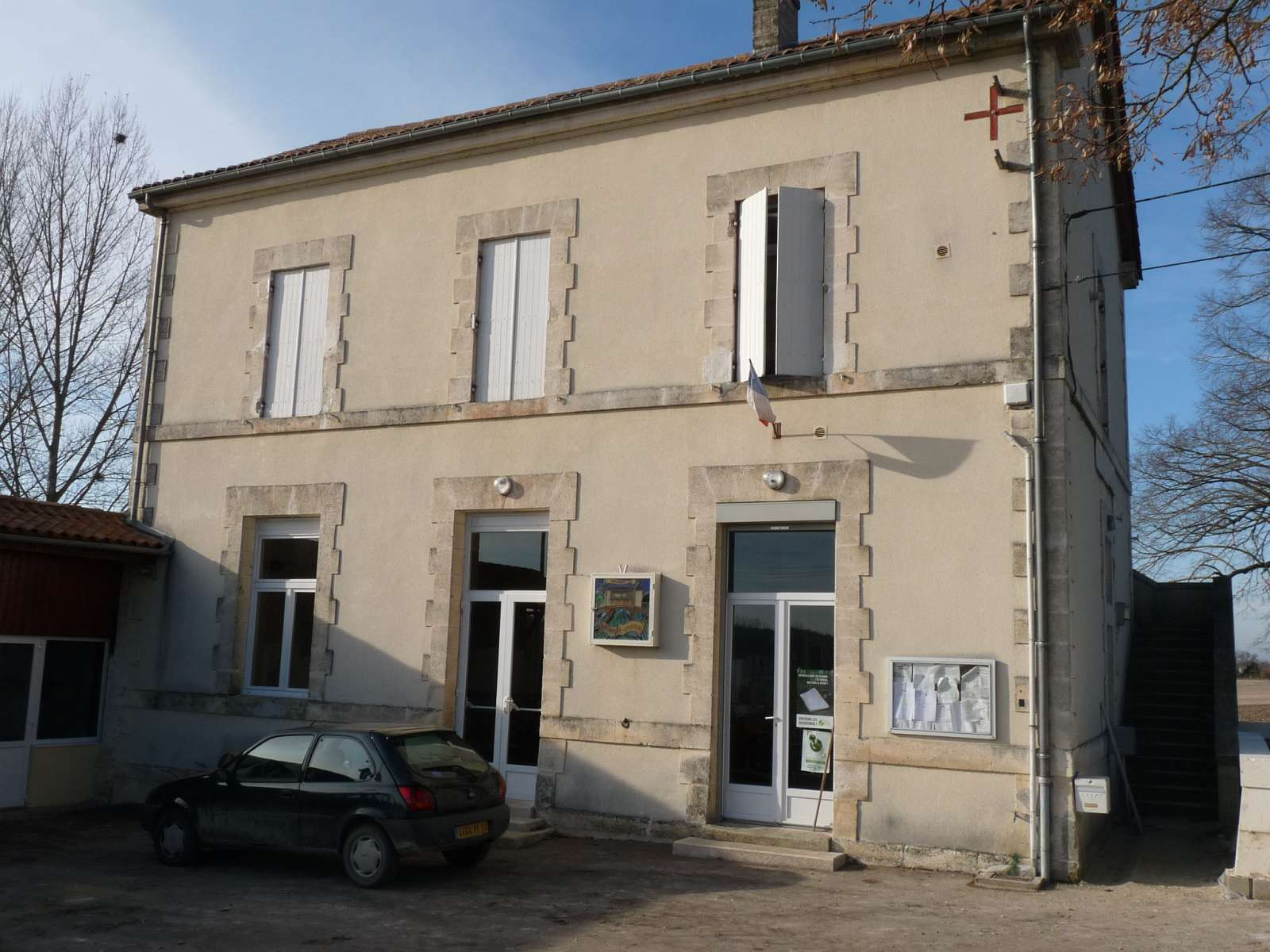
- The town hall in Comberanche
- Location of Comberanche-et-Épeluche
- Location within France Location within Nouvelle-Aquitaine
- Coordinates: 45°16′27″N 0°16′59″E
- Country: France
- Region: Nouvelle-Aquitaine
- Department: Dordogne
- Arrondissement: Périgueux
- Canton: Ribérac
- Intercommunality: Périgord Ribéracois

Government
  - Mayor (2020–2026): Murielle Cassier
- Area^{1}: 3.93 km^{2} (1.52 sq mi)
- Elevation: 70 m (230 ft)
- Highest elevation: 120 m (390 ft)
- Lowest elevation: 50 m (160 ft)
- Population (2023): 165
  - Density: 42.0/km^{2} (109/sq mi)
- Time zone: UTC+01:00 (CET)
  - Summer (DST): UTC+02:00 (CEST)
- INSEE/Postal code: 24128 /24600
- ^{1} French Land Register data, which excludes lakes, ponds, glaciers > 1 km^{2} (0.386 sq mi or 247 acres) and river estuaries.

Comberanche-et-Épeluche (French pronunciation: [kɔ̃bʁɑ̃ʃ e eplyʃ]; Occitan: Combairencha e Espelucha) is a commune in the Dordogne department in Nouvelle-Aquitaine in southwestern France.

Surrounded by the towns of Bourg-du-Bost, Germans, and Petit-Bersac, Comberanche-and-Épeluche is located 37 km northwest of Perigueux.

In 1820, the communes of Comberanche and Épeluche merged into Comberanche-et-Épeluche.

== Population ==
Historical population
Year	Pop.	±% p.a.
1968	161	—
1975	142	−1.78%
1982	128	−1.47%
1990	130	+0.19%
1999	120	−0.89%
2007	176	+4.90%
2012	166	−1.16%
2017	168	+0.24%
2023	165	−0.30%
Source: INSEE

== See also ==
- Communes of the Dordogne department
