= Cherval =

- Commune
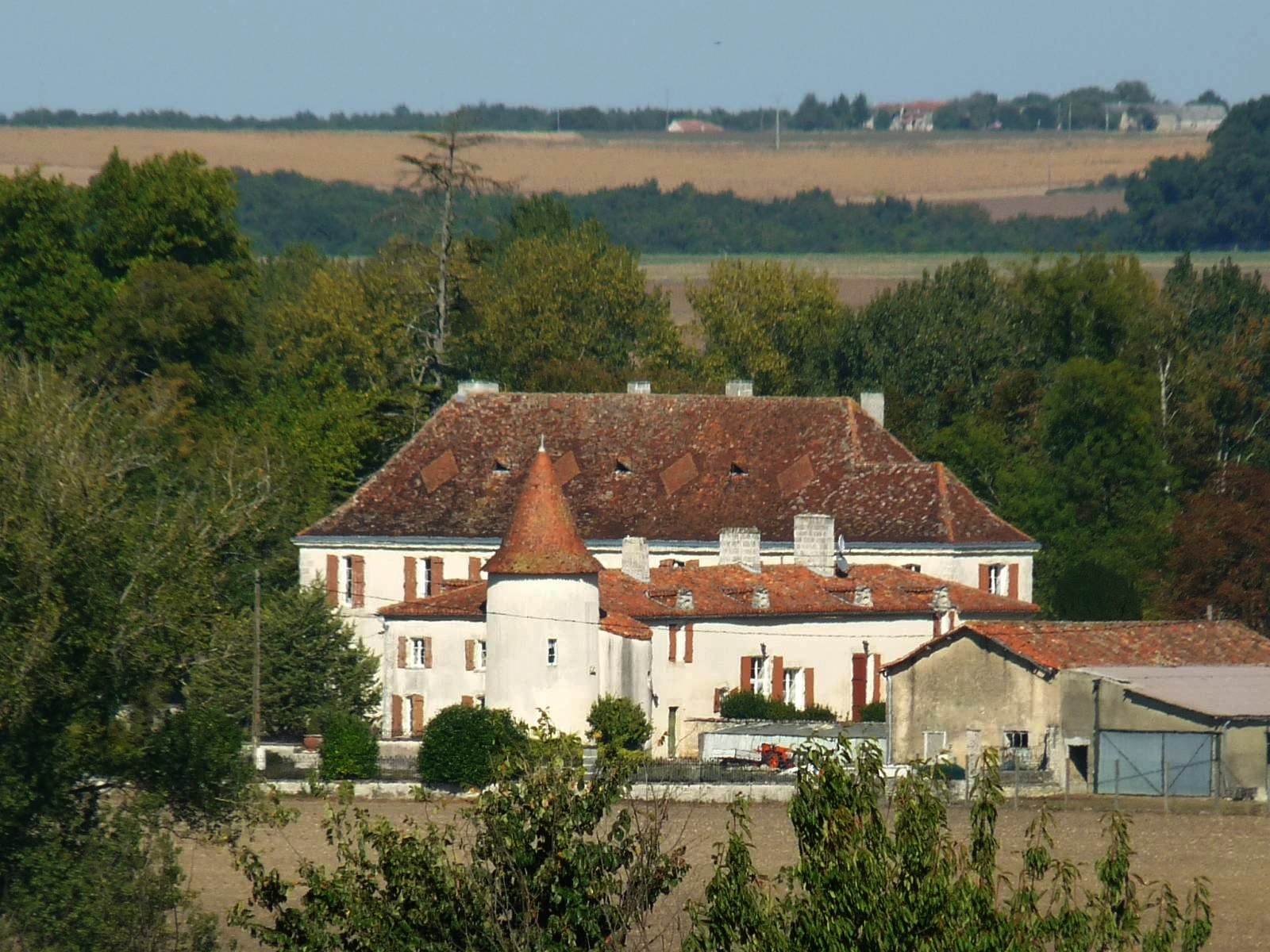
- Chateau of Bourbet
- Location of Cherval
- Location within France Location within Nouvelle-Aquitaine
- Coordinates: 45°23′44″N 0°22′31″E
- Country: France
- Region: Nouvelle-Aquitaine
- Department: Dordogne
- Arrondissement: Périgueux
- Canton: Ribérac

Government
  - Mayor (2020–2026): Jean-Pierre Prunier
- Area^{1}: 18.71 km^{2} (7.22 sq mi)
- Elevation: 119 m (390 ft)
- Highest elevation: 183 m (600 ft)
- Lowest elevation: 93 m (305 ft)
- Population (2023): 222
  - Density: 11.9/km^{2} (30.7/sq mi)
- Time zone: UTC+01:00 (CET)
  - Summer (DST): UTC+02:00 (CEST)
- INSEE/Postal code: 24119 /24320
- ^{1} French Land Register data, which excludes lakes, ponds, glaciers > 1 km^{2} (0.386 sq mi or 247 acres) and river estuaries.

Cherval (French pronunciation: [ʃɛʁval]; Occitan: Charvard) is a commune in the Dordogne department in Nouvelle-Aquitaine in southwestern France.

== Population ==
Historical population
Year	Pop.	±% p.a.
1968	362	—
1975	342	−0.81%
1982	295	−2.09%
1990	310	+0.62%
1999	308	−0.07%
2007	312	+0.16%
2012	286	−1.73%
2017	274	−0.85%
2023	222	−3.45%
Source: INSEE

== See also ==
- Château du Bourbet
- Communes of the Dordogne department
