= Coutures =

Coutures is the name of several communes in France:

- Coutures, Dordogne, in the Dordogne department
- Coutures, Gironde, in the Gironde department
- Coutures, Maine-et-Loire, in the Maine-et-Loire department
- Coutures, Tarn-et-Garonne, in the Tarn-et-Garonne department
