= Siorac-de-Ribérac =

- Commune
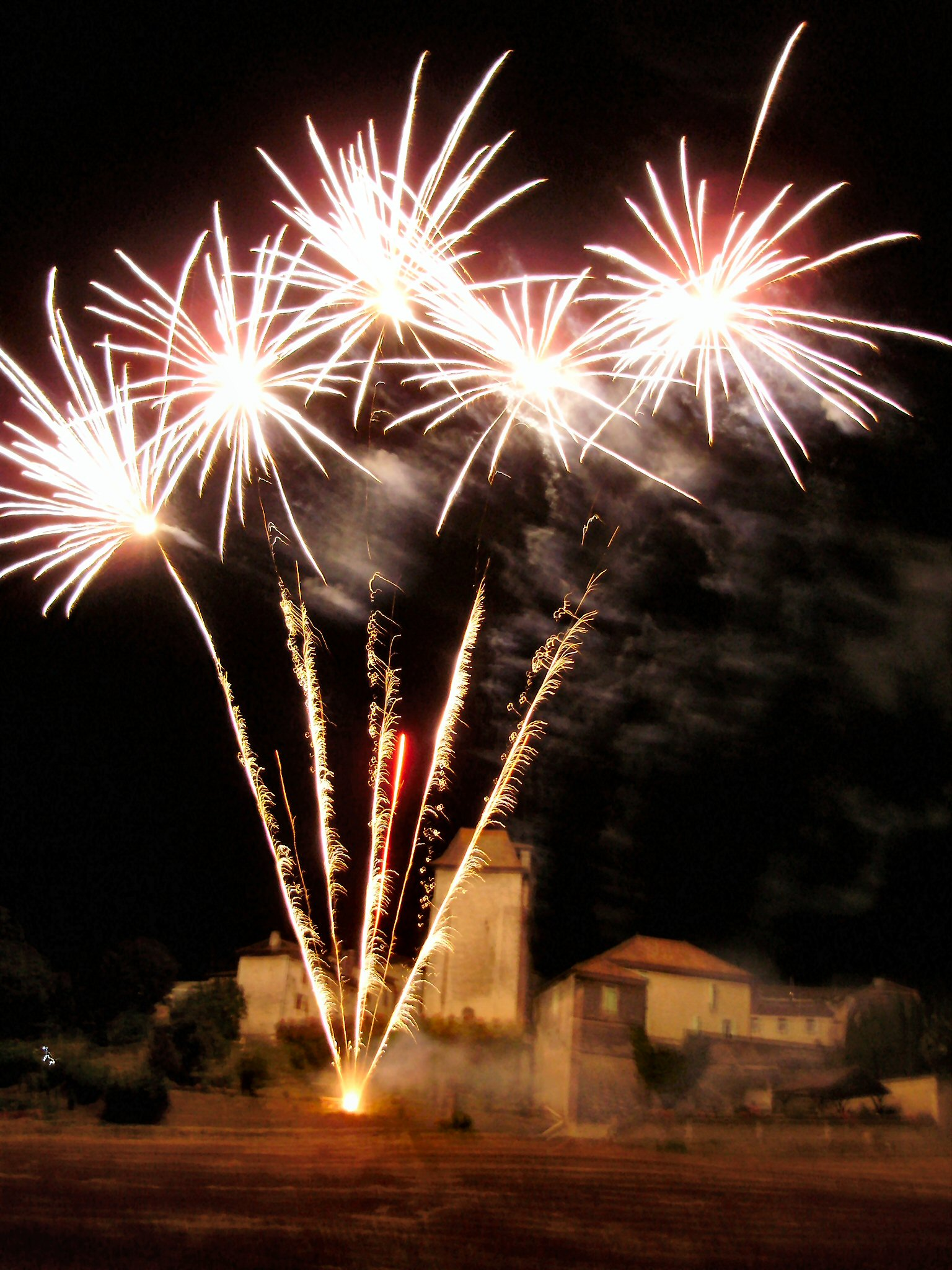
- Fireworks light up the village at its annual fete

- Coat of arms
- Location of Siorac-de-Ribérac
- Location within France Location within Nouvelle-Aquitaine
- Coordinates: 45°11′54″N 0°21′32″E
- Country: France
- Region: Nouvelle-Aquitaine
- Department: Dordogne
- Arrondissement: Périgueux
- Canton: Ribérac

Government
  - Mayor (2020–2026): Jean-Pierre Chaumette
- Area^{1}: 20.86 km^{2} (8.05 sq mi)
- Elevation: 177 m (581 ft)
- Highest elevation: 105 m (344 ft)
- Lowest elevation: 73 m (240 ft)
- Population (2023): 258
  - Density: 12.4/km^{2} (32.0/sq mi)
- Time zone: UTC+01:00 (CET)
  - Summer (DST): UTC+02:00 (CEST)
- INSEE/Postal code: 24537 /24600
- ^{1} French Land Register data, which excludes lakes, ponds, glaciers > 1 km^{2} (0.386 sq mi or 247 acres) and river estuaries.

Siorac-de-Ribérac (French pronunciation: [sjɔʁak də ʁibeʁak], literally Siorac of Ribérac; Occitan: Sieurac de Rabairac) is a commune in the Dordogne department in the Nouvelle-Aquitaine region of southwestern France.

== Geography ==
The commune of Siorac-de-Ribérac lies in the forest of the Double, in the west of the Dordogne department. It is bounded on its south side for about 4 km by the Rizonne stream, which separates it from the neighbouring communes of Saint-André-de-Double and Saint-Vincent-de-Connezac.

The soil is composed in part of Eocene and Oligocene sands, clays and gravels, and in part of chalk of the Campanian period.

The commune's lowest point, at 73 m, is to the southwest, where the Rizonne leaves the commune for Vanxains and La Jemaye. The highest point, at 195 m, is to the northeast, at The Temple, at the boundary with Saint-Martin-de-Ribérac.

== Church ==
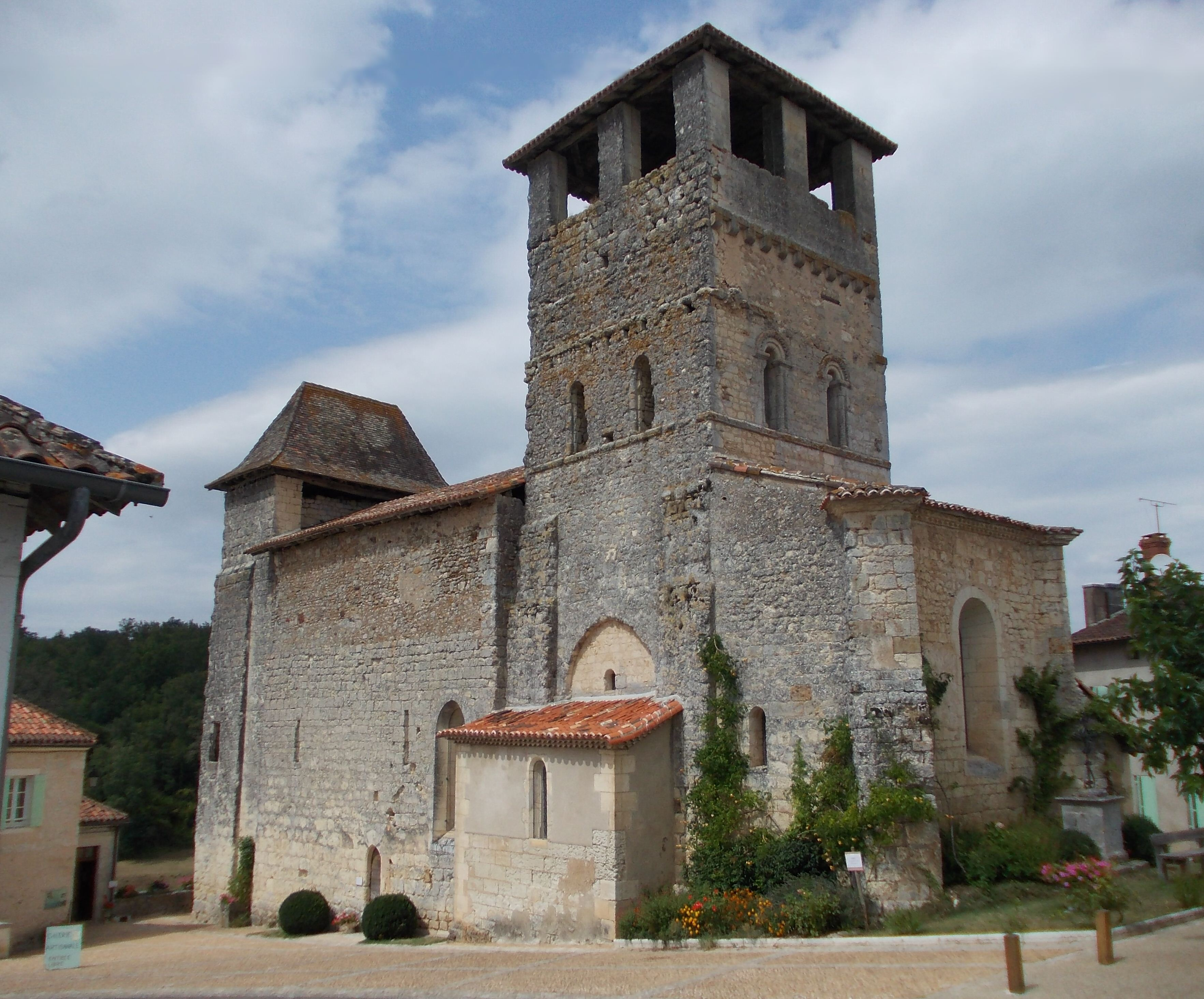
Siorac's romanesque church dates from the 12th and 14th centuries

The village church of St Peter in Chains began in 1154, during the English period in the region, Aquitaine. The 12th-century freestone nave and bell tower survived. At that time, the church was part of the Benedictine priory of the nuns of Ligueux. In the 14th century, during the Hundred Years' War between England and France, the defensive rectangular tower was added, using quarry stone. At the same time, the walls and bell tower were increased in height, again with quarry stone. The walls at the west entrance are believed to be 3 meters thick. A bell was provided in 1851; it was replaced in 1979. The nave originally had a wooden vault; it has been replaced by a stone vault.

== Population ==
Historical population
Year	Pop.	±% p.a.
1968	270	—
1975	226	−2.51%
1982	228	+0.13%
1990	227	−0.05%
1999	265	+1.73%
2007	259	−0.29%
2012	256	−0.23%
2017	251	−0.39%
2023	258	+0.46%
Source: INSEE

== Gallery ==
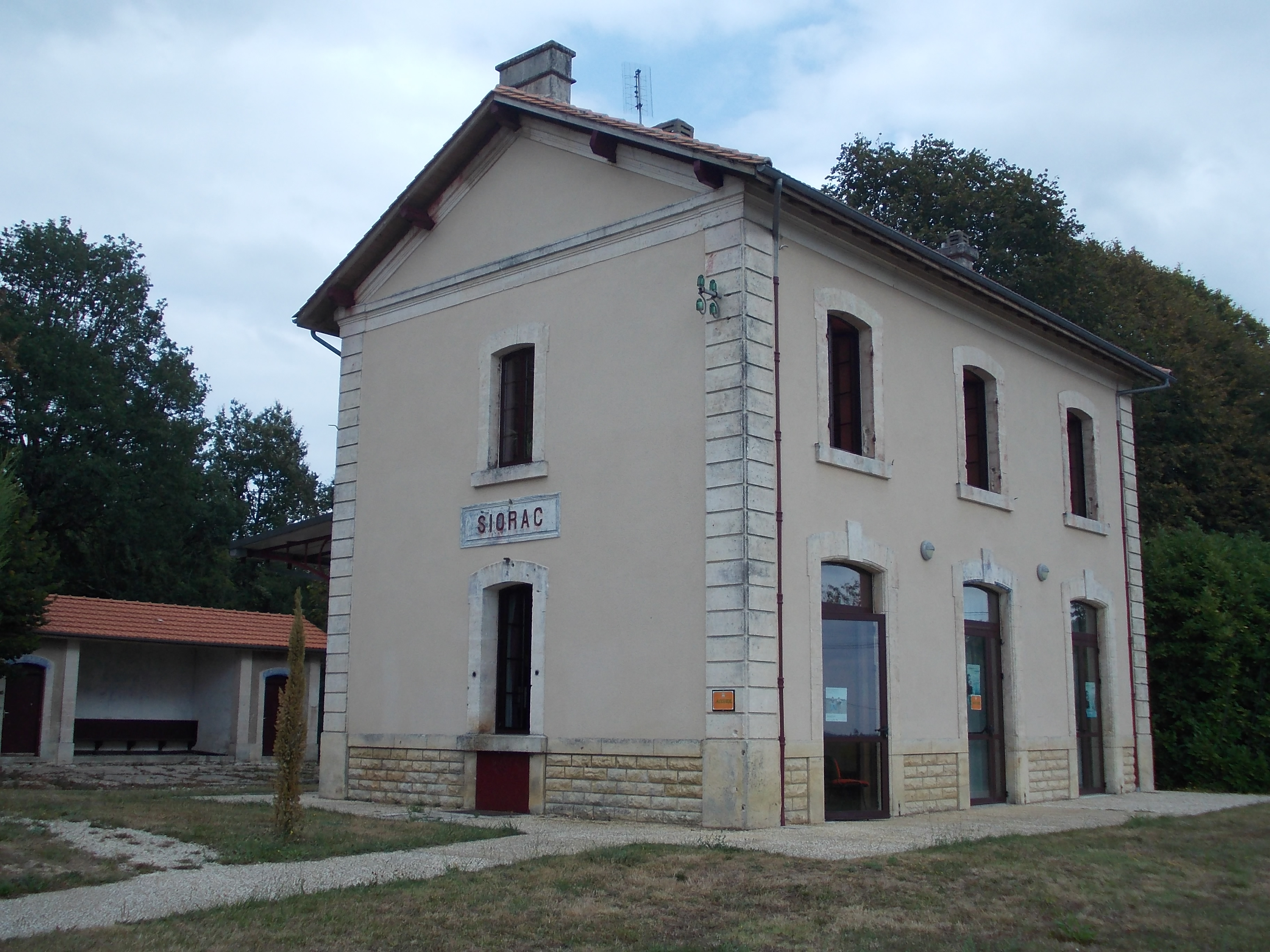
The old railway station, now an activity centre

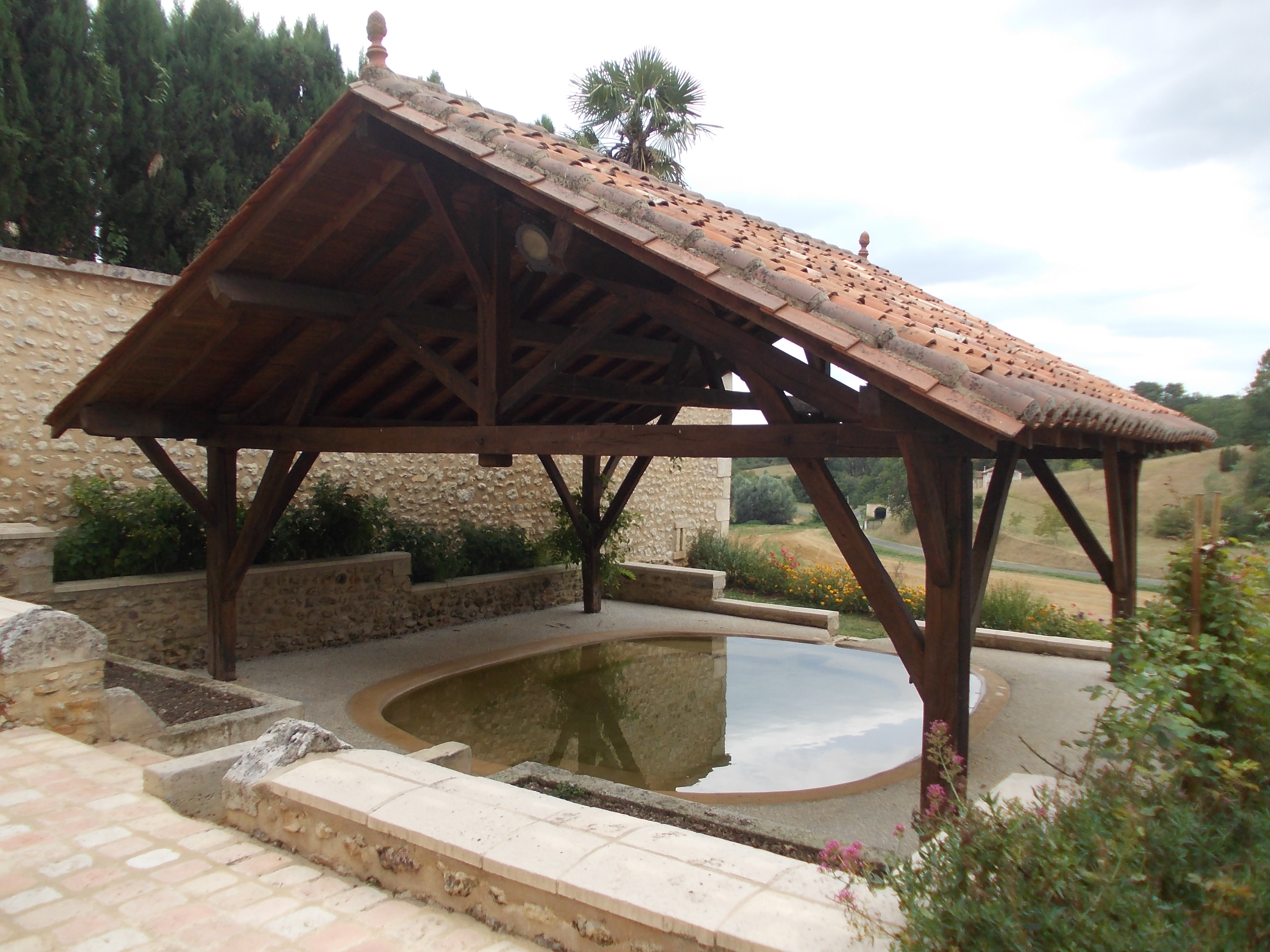
The restored wash-house or "Lavoir"

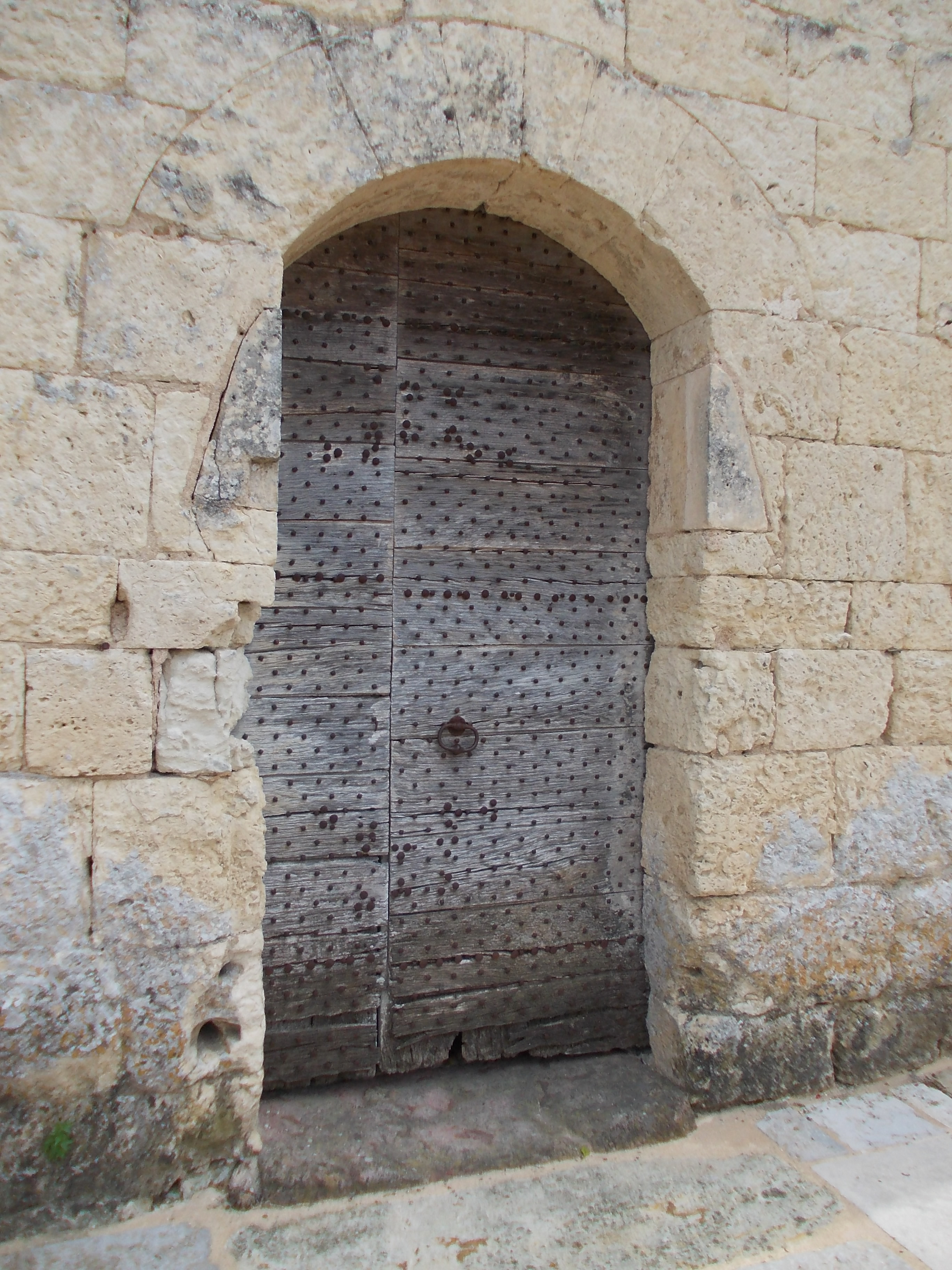
The west door of the church

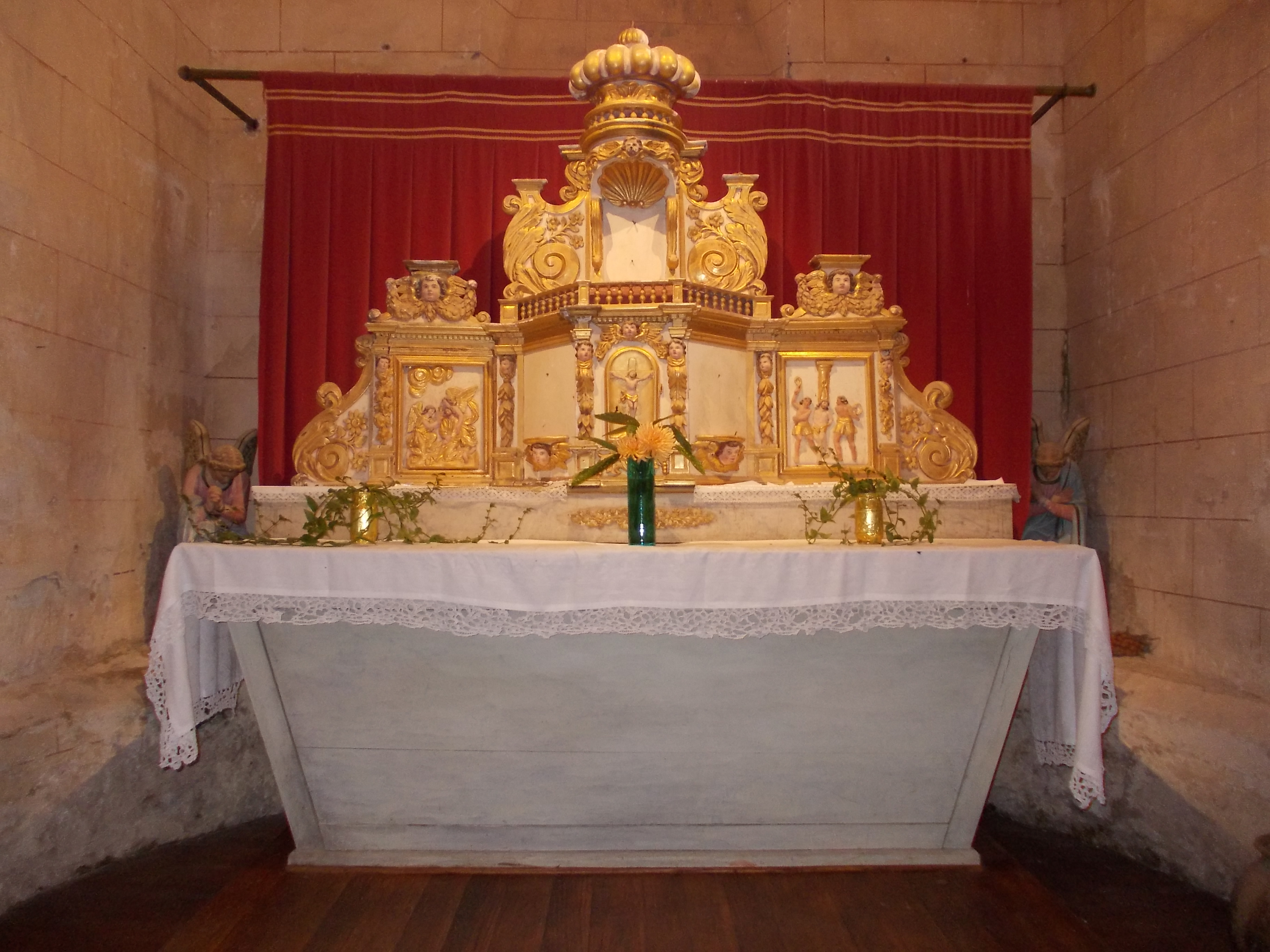
Gilt and polychrome wood altarpiece or retable in the church, made in the 17th century for the Carthusian monastery of Vauclair, Montpon

== See also ==
- Communes of the Dordogne département

== Sources ==
- Dignac, Léopold (not dated, printed ca 1960). Monographie de Siorac-de-Ribérac. Imprimerie Périgourdine. (160 pages, octavo, illustrated with monochrome photographs)
