= Saint-Pardoux-de-Drône =

- Commune
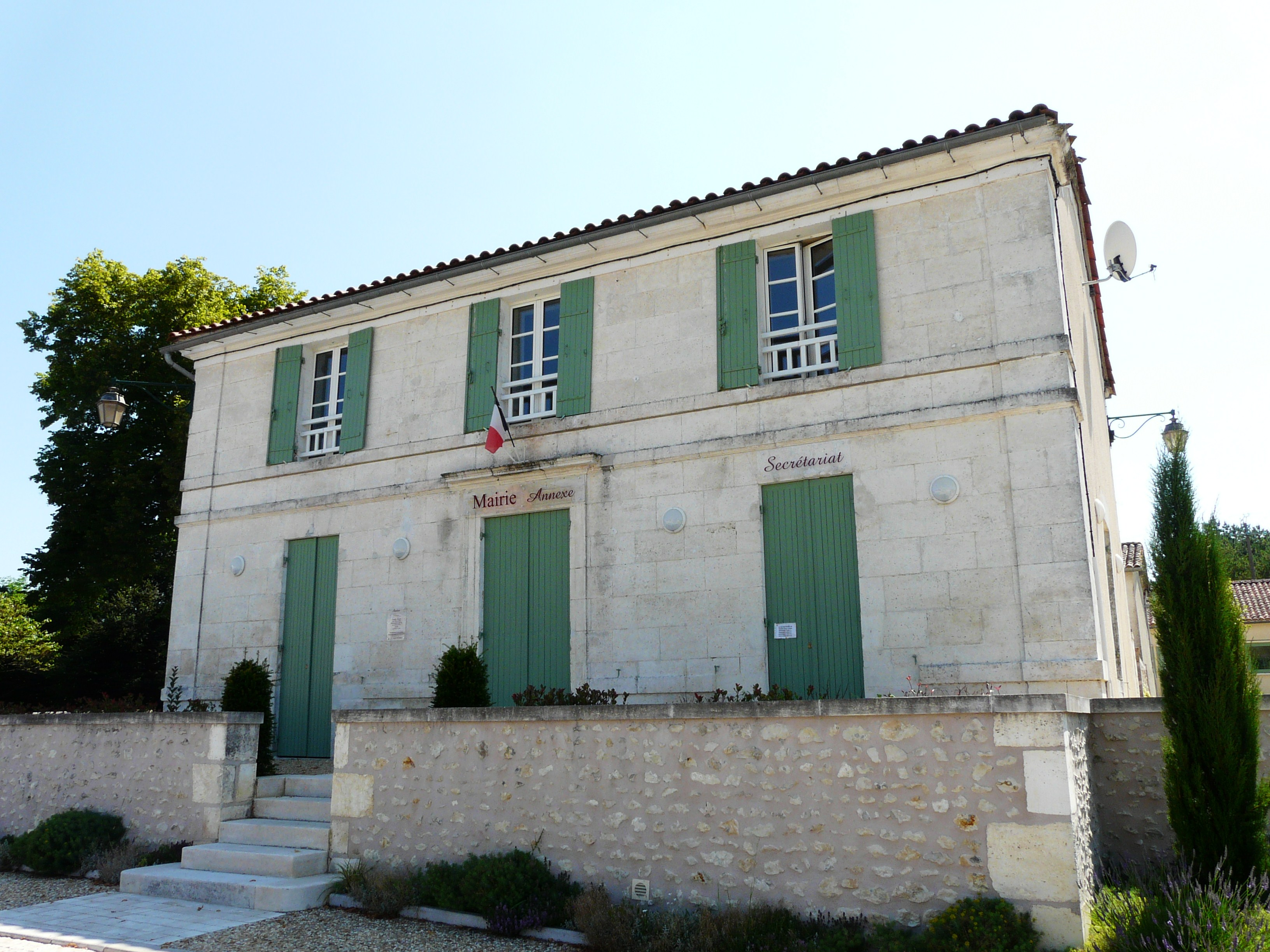
- The town hall in Saint-Pardoux-de-Drône
- Location of Saint-Pardoux-de-Drône
- Location within France Location within Nouvelle-Aquitaine
- Coordinates: 45°13′36″N 0°25′19″E
- Country: France
- Region: Nouvelle-Aquitaine
- Department: Dordogne
- Arrondissement: Périgueux
- Canton: Ribérac

Government
  - Mayor (2020–2026): Fabrice Boniface
- Area^{1}: 8.69 km^{2} (3.36 sq mi)
- Elevation: 170 m (560 ft)
- Highest elevation: 207 m (679 ft)
- Lowest elevation: 79 m (259 ft)
- Population (2023): 191
  - Density: 22.0/km^{2} (56.9/sq mi)
- Time zone: UTC+01:00 (CET)
  - Summer (DST): UTC+02:00 (CEST)
- INSEE/Postal code: 24477 /24600
- ^{1} French Land Register data, which excludes lakes, ponds, glaciers > 1 km^{2} (0.386 sq mi or 247 acres) and river estuaries.

Saint-Pardoux-de-Drône (French pronunciation: [sɛ̃ paʁdu də dʁon], literally Saint-Pardoux of Drône; Occitan: Sent Perdon de Drona) is a commune in the Dordogne department in Nouvelle-Aquitaine in southwestern France.

== Population ==
Historical population
Year	Pop.	±% p.a.
1968	246	—
1975	232	−0.83%
1982	221	−0.69%
1990	218	−0.17%
1999	215	−0.15%
2007	215	+0.00%
2012	213	−0.19%
2017	198	−1.45%
2023	191	−0.60%
Source: INSEE

== See also ==
- Communes of the Dordogne department
