= Bourg-des-Maisons =

- Commune
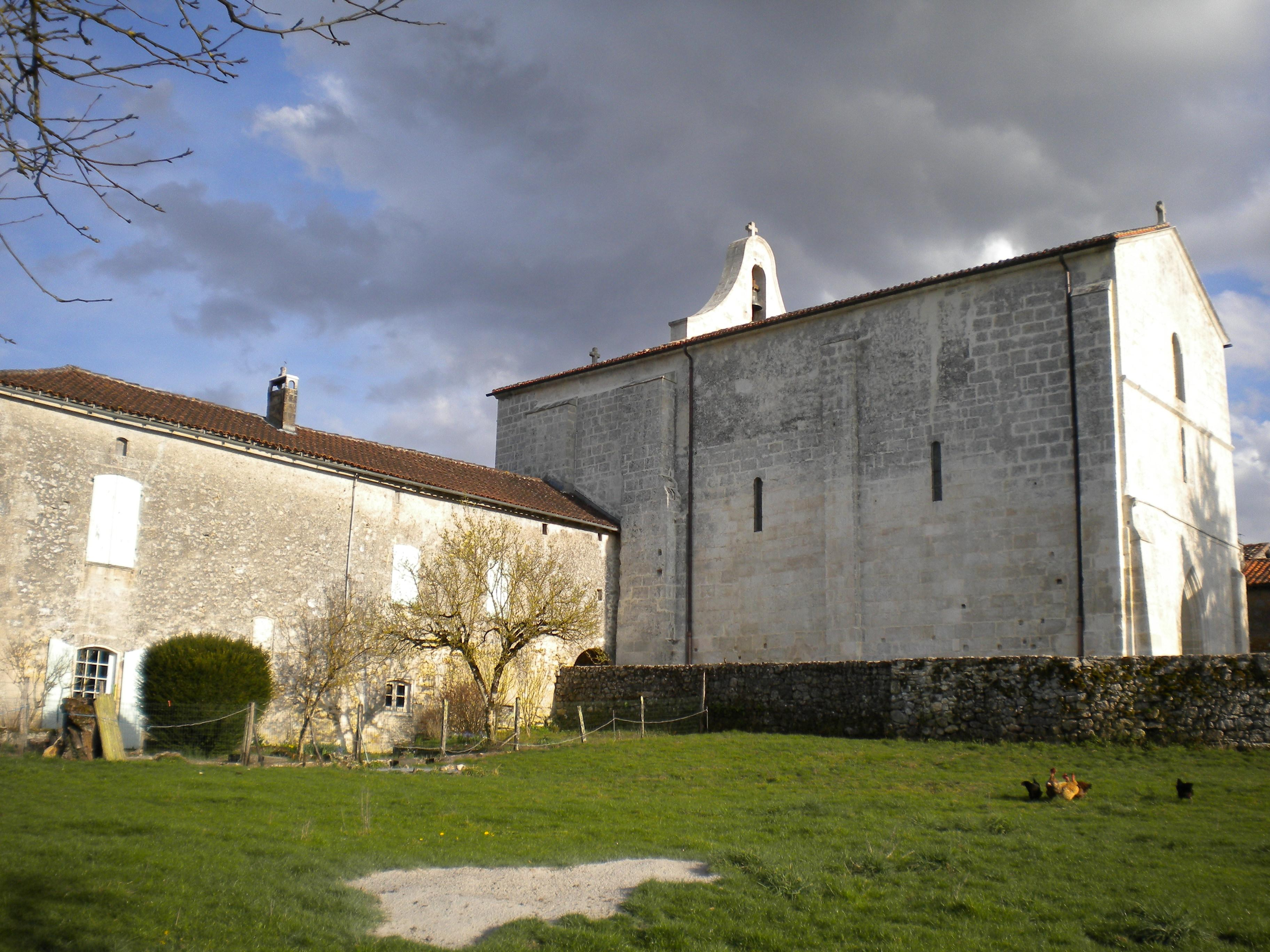
- The church in Bourg-des-Maisons
- Location of Bourg-des-Maisons
- Location within France Location within Nouvelle-Aquitaine
- Coordinates: 45°20′20″N 0°26′11″E
- Country: France
- Region: Nouvelle-Aquitaine
- Department: Dordogne
- Arrondissement: Périgueux
- Canton: Ribérac

Government
  - Mayor (2020–2026): Bernadette Bazinet
- Area^{1}: 8.99 km^{2} (3.47 sq mi)
- Elevation: 206 m (676 ft)
- Highest elevation: 216 m (709 ft)
- Lowest elevation: 129 m (423 ft)
- Population (2023): 73
  - Density: 8.1/km^{2} (21/sq mi)
- Time zone: UTC+01:00 (CET)
  - Summer (DST): UTC+02:00 (CEST)
- INSEE/Postal code: 24057 /24320
- ^{1} French Land Register data, which excludes lakes, ponds, glaciers > 1 km^{2} (0.386 sq mi or 247 acres) and river estuaries.

Bourg-des-Maisons (French pronunciation: [buʁ de mɛzɔ̃]; Occitan: Borg de Maisons) is a commune in the Dordogne department in southwestern France.

== Population ==
Historical population
Year	Pop.	±% p.a.
1968	86	—
1975	80	−1.03%
1982	51	−6.23%
1990	55	+0.95%
1999	78	+3.96%
2007	69	−1.52%
2012	62	−2.12%
2017	68	+1.86%
2023	73	+1.19%
Source: INSEE

== See also ==
- Communes of the Dordogne département
