= Canton of Ribérac =

Coordinates: 45°15′N 0°20′E

Ribérac
- Canton
- Interactive map of Ribérac
- Country: France
- Region: Nouvelle-Aquitaine
- Department: Dordogne
- No. of communes: {{{nbcomm}}}
- Area: 524.25 km^{2} (202.41 sq mi)
- Population (2023): 14,120
  - Density: 26.93/km^{2} (69.76/sq mi)
- INSEE code: 24 16

The Canton of Ribérac is a canton of the Dordogne département, in France. At the French canton reorganisation which came into effect in March 2015, the canton of Ribérac was expanded from 13 to 35 communes (4 of which merged into the new communes La Tour-Blanche-Cercles and La Jemaye-Ponteyraud):

- Allemans
- Bertric-Burée
- Bourg-des-Maisons
- Bourg-du-Bost
- Bouteilles-Saint-Sébastien
- Celles
- Champagne-et-Fontaine
- La Chapelle-Grésignac
- La Chapelle-Montabourlet
- Chassaignes
- Cherval
- Comberanche-et-Épeluche
- Coutures
- Gout-Rossignol
- La Jemaye-Ponteyraud
- Lusignac
- Nanteuil-Auriac-de-Bourzac
- Petit-Bersac
- Ribérac
- Saint-André-de-Double
- Saint-Martial-Viveyrol
- Saint-Martin-de-Ribérac
- Saint-Méard-de-Drône
- Saint-Pardoux-de-Drône
- Saint-Paul-Lizonne
- Saint-Sulpice-de-Roumagnac
- Saint-Vincent-de-Connezac
- Siorac-de-Ribérac
- La Tour-Blanche-Cercles
- Vanxains
- Vendoire
- Verteillac
- Villetoureix

== See also ==
- Cantons of the Dordogne department
