= Communes of the Dordogne department =

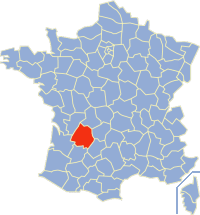

The following is a list of the 503 communes of the Dordogne department of France.

The communes cooperate in the following intercommunalities (as of 2025):

- Communauté d'agglomération Bergeracoise
- Communauté d'agglomération Le Grand Périgueux
- Communauté de communes des Bastides Dordogne-Périgord
- Communauté de communes Castillon-Pujols (partly)
- Communauté de communes de Domme Villefranche-du-Périgord
- Communauté de communes Dronne et Belle
- Communauté de communes Isle et Crempse en Périgord
- Communauté de communes Isle Double Landais
- Communauté de communes Isle-Loue-Auvézère en Périgord
- Communauté de communes Isle, Vern, Salembre en Périgord
- Communauté de communes de Montaigne Montravel et Gurson
- Communauté de communes du Pays de Fénelon
- Communauté de communes du Pays Foyen (partly)
- Communauté de communes du Pays de Saint-Aulaye
- Communauté de communes Périgord-Limousin
- Communauté de communes du Périgord Nontronnais
- Communauté de communes du Périgord Ribéracois
- Communauté de communes des Portes Sud Périgord
- Communauté de communes Sarlat-Périgord noir
- Communauté de communes du Terrassonnais en Périgord noir Thenon Hautefort
- Communauté de communes Vallée de la Dordogne et Forêt Bessède
- Communauté de communes de la Vallée de l'Homme

INSEE	Postal	Commune
24001	24300	Abjat-sur-Bandiat
24002	24460	Agonac
24004	24210	Ajat
24006	24220	Allas-les-Mines
24007	24600	Allemans
24005	24480	Alles-sur-Dordogne
24008	24270	Angoisse
24009	24160	Anlhiac
24010	24430	Annesse-et-Beaulieu
24011	24420	Antonne-et-Trigonant
24012	24590	Archignac
24014	24290	Aubas
24015	24260	Audrix
24016	24300	Augignac
24018	24290	Auriac-du-Périgord
24019	24210	Azerat
24020	24210	La Bachellerie
24021	24390	Badefols-d'Ans
24022	24150	Badefols-sur-Dordogne
24023	24150	Baneuil
24024	24560	Bardou
24025	24210	Bars
24026	24330	Bassillac et Auberoche
24027	24150	Bayac
24028	24440	Beaumontois-en-Périgord
24029	24400	Beaupouyet
24030	24120	Beauregard-de-Terrasson
24031	24140	Beauregard-et-Bassac
24032	24400	Beauronne
24034	24140	Beleymas
24036	24220	Berbiguières
24037	24100	Bergerac
24038	24320	Bertric-Burée
24039	24550	Besse
24040	24220	Beynac-et-Cazenac
24042	24310	Biras
24043	24540	Biron
24045	24560	Boisse
24046	24390	Boisseuilh
24048	24230	Bonneville-et-Saint-Avit-de-Fumadières
24050	24590	Borrèze
24051	24130	Bosset
24052	24480	Bouillac
24053	24750	Boulazac Isle Manoire
24054	24560	Bouniagues
24055	24310	Bourdeilles
24056	24300	Le Bourdeix
24057	24320	Bourg-des-Maisons
24058	24600	Bourg-du-Bost
24059	24400	Bourgnac
24060	24150	Bourniquel
24061	24110	Bourrou
24062	24320	Bouteilles-Saint-Sébastien
24063	24250	Bouzic
24064	24310	Brantôme en Périgord
24066	24210	Brouchaud
24067	24260	Le Bugue
24068	24480	Le Buisson-de-Cadouin
24069	24350	Bussac
24070	24360	Busserolles
24071	24360	Bussière-Badil
24073	24150	Calès
24074	24370	Calviac-en-Périgord
24075	24550	Campagnac-lès-Quercy
24076	24260	Campagne
24077	24140	Campsegret
24080	24540	Capdrot
24081	24370	Carlux
24082	24200	Carsac-Aillac
24083	24610	Carsac-de-Gurson
24084	24170	Carves
24085	24120	La Cassagne
24086	24250	Castelnaud-la-Chapelle
24087	24220	Castels et Bézenac
24088	24150	Cause-de-Clérans
24090	24600	Celles
24091	24250	Cénac-et-Saint-Julien
24094	24380	Chalagnac
24095	24800	Chalais
24096	24530	Champagnac-de-Belair
24097	24320	Champagne-et-Fontaine
24098	24750	Champcevinel
24100	24360	Champniers-et-Reilhac
24101	24470	Champs-Romain
24102	24650	Chancelade
24104	24190	Chantérac
24105	24320	Chapdeuil
24106	24290	La Chapelle-Aubareil
24107	24530	La Chapelle-Faucher
24108	24350	La Chapelle-Gonaguet
24109	24320	La Chapelle-Grésignac
24110	24320	La Chapelle-Montabourlet
24111	24300	La Chapelle-Montmoreau
24113	24390	La Chapelle-Saint-Jean
24114	24600	Chassaignes
24115	24460	Château-l'Évêque
24116	24120	Châtres
24119	24320	Cherval
24120	24390	Cherveix-Cubas
24121	24640	Chourgnac
24122	24170	Cladech
24123	24140	Clermont-de-Beauregard
24124	24160	Clermont-d'Excideuil
24126	24560	Colombier
24364	24290	Coly-Saint-Amand
24128	24600	Comberanche-et-Épeluche
24129	24530	Condat-sur-Trincou
24130	24570	Condat-sur-Vézère
24132	24560	Conne-de-Labarde
24131	24300	Connezac
24133	24450	La Coquille
24134	24800	Corgnac-sur-l'Isle
24135	24750	Cornille
24117	24120	Les Coteaux Périgourdins
24136	24390	Coubjours
24137	24420	Coulaures
24138	24660	Coulounieix-Chamiers
24139	24430	Coursac
24140	24520	Cours-de-Pile
24141	24320	Coutures
24142	24220	Coux-et-Bigaroque-Mouzens
24143	24150	Couze-et-Saint-Front
24144	24350	Creyssac
24145	24100	Creysse
24146	24380	Creyssensac-et-Pissot
24147	24640	Cubjac-Auvézère-Val d'Ans
24148	24240	Cunèges
24150	24250	Daglan
24151	24170	Doissat
24152	24250	Domme
24153	24120	La Dornac
24154	24350	Douchapt
24155	24140	Douville
24156	24330	La Douze
24157	24190	Douzillac
24158	24270	Dussac
24159	24410	Échourgnac
24160	24380	Église-Neuve-de-Vergt
24161	24400	Église-Neuve-d'Issac
24162	24420	Escoire
24163	24360	Étouars
24164	24160	Excideuil
24165	24700	Eygurande-et-Gardedeuil
24167	24500	Eymet
24259	24140	Eyraud-Crempse-Maurens
24171	24800	Eyzerac
24172	24620	Les Eyzies
24174	24290	Fanlac
24175	24290	Les Farges
24176	24560	Faurilles
24177	24560	Faux-en-Périgord
24179	24120	La Feuillade
24180	24450	Firbeix
24182	24130	Le Fleix
24183	24580	Fleurac
24184	24250	Florimont-Gaumier
24186	24500	Fonroque
24222	24130	La Force
24188	24210	Fossemagne
24189	33220	Fougueyrolles
24190	24380	Fouleix
24191	24130	Fraisse
24192	24210	Gabillou
24193	24240	Gageac-et-Rouillac
24194	24680	Gardonne
24195	24540	Gaugeac
24196	24160	Génis
24197	24130	Ginestet
24199	24320	Gout-Rossignol
24200	24350	Grand-Brassac
24202	24390	Granges-d'Ans
24205	24110	Grignols
24206	24170	Grives
24207	24250	Groléjac
24208	24380	Grun-Bordas
24209	24300	Hautefaye
24210	24390	Hautefort
24211	24400	Issac
24212	24560	Issigeac
24213	24140	Jaure
24214	24300	Javerlhac-et-la-Chapelle-Saint-Robert
24215	24590	Jayac
24216	24410	La Jemaye-Ponteyraud
24217	24260	Journiac
24218	24630	Jumilhac-le-Grand
24220	24380	Lacropte
24223	24150	Lalinde
24224	24520	Lamonzie-Montastruc
24225	24680	Lamonzie-Saint-Martin
24226	24230	Lamothe-Montravel
24227	24270	Lanouaille
24228	24150	Lanquais
24229	24570	Le Lardin-Saint-Lazare
24230	24170	Larzac
24231	24540	Lavalade
24232	24550	Lavaur
24234	24400	Les Lèches
24236	24110	Léguillac-de-l'Auche
24237	24100	Lembras
24238	24800	Lempzours
24240	24510	Limeuil
24241	24210	Limeyrat
24242	24520	Liorac-sur-Louyre
24243	24350	Lisle
24244	24540	Lolme
24245	24550	Loubejac
24246	24130	Lunas
24247	24320	Lusignac
24248	24300	Lussas-et-Nontronneau
24251	24110	Manzac-sur-Vern
24252	24200	Marcillac-Saint-Quentin
24253	24340	Mareuil en Périgord
24254	24220	Marnac
24255	24620	Marquay
24256	24430	Marsac-sur-l'Isle
24257	24540	Marsalès
24260	24150	Mauzac-et-Grand-Castang
24261	24260	Mauzens-et-Miremont
24262	24420	Mayac
24263	24550	Mazeyrolles
24264	24700	Ménesplet
24266	24350	Mensignac
24267	24240	Mescoules
24268	24220	Meyrals
24269	24450	Mialet
24271	24470	Milhac-de-Nontron
24272	24610	Minzac
24273	24480	Molières
24274	24240	Monbazillac
24276	24240	Monestier
24277	24130	Monfaucon
24278	24560	Monmadalès
24279	24560	Monmarvès
24280	24540	Monpazier
24293	24170	Monplaisant
24281	24440	Monsac
24282	24560	Monsaguel
24284	24210	Montagnac-d'Auberoche
24285	24140	Montagnac-la-Crempse
24286	24350	Montagrier
24287	24560	Montaut
24288	24230	Montazeau
24289	24230	Montcaret
24290	24440	Montferrand-du-Périgord
24291	24290	Montignac-Lascaux
24292	24610	Montpeyroux
24294	24700	Montpon-Ménestérol
24295	24110	Montrem
24296	24520	Mouleydier
24297	24700	Moulin-Neuf

INSEE	Postal	Commune
24299	24400	Mussidan
24300	24250	Nabirat
24301	24590	Nadaillac
24302	24390	Nailhac
24303	24320	Nanteuil-Auriac-de-Bourzac
24304	24800	Nantheuil
24305	24800	Nanthiat
24306	24230	Nastringues
24307	24440	Naussannes
24308	24460	Négrondes
24309	24190	Neuvic
24311	24300	Nontron
24313	24170	Orliac
24316	24410	Parcoul-Chenaud
24317	24590	Paulin
24318	24510	Paunat
24319	24310	Paussac-et-Saint-Vivien
24035	24170	Pays-de-Belvès
24320	24270	Payzac
24321	24120	Pazayac
24325	24370	Pechs-de-l'Espérance
24322	24000	Périgueux
24323	24600	Petit-Bersac
24324	24210	Peyrignac
24326	24620	Peyzac-le-Moustier
24327	24510	Pezuls
24328	24360	Piégut-Pluviers
24329	24700	Le Pizou
24168	24560	Plaisance
24330	24580	Plazac
24331	24240	Pomport
24334	24150	Pontours
24335	33220	Port-Sainte-Foy-et-Ponchapt
24336	24370	Prats-de-Carlux
24337	24550	Prats-du-Périgord
24338	24150	Pressignac-Vicq
24339	24160	Preyssac-d'Excideuil
24340	24130	Prigonrieux
24341	24200	Proissans
24345	24140	Queyssac
24346	24530	Quinsac
24347	24440	Rampieux
24349	24240	Razac-de-Saussignac
24348	24500	Razac-d'Eymet
24350	24430	Razac-sur-l'Isle
24351	24240	Ribagnac
24352	24600	Ribérac
24353	24340	La Rochebeaucourt-et-Argentine
24354	24490	La Roche-Chalais
24355	24250	La Roque-Gageac
24357	24240	Rouffignac-de-Sigoulès
24356	24580	Rouffignac-Saint-Cernin-de-Reilhac
24221	24340	Rudeau-Ladosse
24359	24500	Sadillac
24360	24170	Sagelat
24361	24520	Saint-Agne
24365	24380	Saint-Amand-de-Vergt
24366	24200	Saint-André-d'Allas
24367	24190	Saint-André-de-Double
24370	24230	Saint-Antoine-de-Breuilh
24371	24110	Saint-Aquilin
24372	24110	Saint-Astier
24373	24500	Saint-Aubin-de-Cadelech
24374	24560	Saint-Aubin-de-Lanquais
24375	24250	Saint-Aubin-de-Nabirat
24376	24410	Saint-Aulaye-Puymangou
24377	24260	Saint-Avit-de-Vialard
24378	24540	Saint-Avit-Rivière
24379	24440	Saint-Avit-Sénieur
24380	24700	Saint-Barthélemy-de-Bellegarde
24381	24360	Saint-Barthélemy-de-Bussière
24382	24150	Saint-Capraise-de-Lalinde
24383	24500	Saint-Capraise-d'Eymet
24384	24540	Saint-Cassien
24385	24560	Saint-Cernin-de-Labarde
24386	24550	Saint-Cernin-de-l'Herm
24388	24260	Saint-Chamassy
24390	24330	Saint-Crépin-d'Auberoche
24392	24590	Saint-Crépin-et-Carlucet
24395	24250	Saint-Cybranet
24396	24220	Saint-Cyprien
24397	24270	Saint-Cyr-les-Champagnes
24393	24440	Sainte-Croix
24394	24340	Sainte-Croix-de-Mareuil
24401	24640	Sainte-Eulalie-d'Ans
24406	24170	Sainte-Foy-de-Belvès
24407	24510	Sainte-Foy-de-Longas
24470	24370	Sainte-Mondane
24471	24200	Sainte-Nathalène
24473	24210	Sainte-Orse
24492	24560	Sainte-Radegonde
24398	24360	Saint-Estèphe
24399	24400	Saint-Étienne-de-Puycorbier
24507	24160	Sainte-Trie
24403	24340	Saint-Félix-de-Bourdeilles
24404	24260	Saint-Félix-de-Reillac-et-Mortemart
24405	24510	Saint-Félix-de-Villadeix
24408	24460	Saint-Front-d'Alemps
24409	24400	Saint-Front-de-Pradoux
24410	24300	Saint-Front-la-Rivière
24411	24300	Saint-Front-sur-Nizonne
24412	24590	Saint-Geniès
24413	24130	Saint-Georges-Blancaneix
24414	24140	Saint-Georges-de-Montclard
24415	24700	Saint-Géraud-de-Corps
24416	24170	Saint-Germain-de-Belvès
24417	24160	Saint-Germain-des-Prés
24418	24190	Saint-Germain-du-Salembre
24419	24520	Saint-Germain-et-Mons
24420	24400	Saint-Géry
24421	24330	Saint-Geyrac
24422	24140	Saint-Hilaire-d'Estissac
24424	24190	Saint-Jean-d'Ataux
24425	24800	Saint-Jean-de-Côle
24426	24140	Saint-Jean-d'Estissac
24428	24800	Saint-Jory-de-Chalais
24429	24160	Saint-Jory-las-Bloux
24432	24370	Saint-Julien-de-Lampon
24423	24500	Saint-Julien-Innocence-Eulalie
24434	24320	Saint-Just
24436	24400	Saint-Laurent-des-Hommes
24437	24100	Saint-Laurent-des-Vignes
24438	24170	Saint-Laurent-la-Vallée
24441	24560	Saint-Léon-d'Issigeac
24442	24110	Saint-Léon-sur-l'Isle
24443	24290	Saint-Léon-sur-Vézère
24444	24400	Saint-Louis-en-l'Isle
24445	24510	Saint-Marcel-du-Périgord
24446	24540	Saint-Marcory
24448	24160	Saint-Martial-d'Albarède
24449	24700	Saint-Martial-d'Artenset
24450	24250	Saint-Martial-de-Nabirat
24451	24300	Saint-Martial-de-Valette
24452	24320	Saint-Martial-Viveyrol
24453	24800	Saint-Martin-de-Fressengeas
24454	24610	Saint-Martin-de-Gurson
24455	24600	Saint-Martin-de-Ribérac
24456	24140	Saint-Martin-des-Combes
24457	24400	Saint-Martin-l'Astier
24458	24300	Saint-Martin-le-Pin
24459	24380	Saint-Mayme-de-Péreyrol
24460	24600	Saint-Méard-de-Drône
24461	24610	Saint-Méard-de-Gurçon
24462	24400	Saint-Médard-de-Mussidan
24463	24160	Saint-Médard-d'Excideuil
24464	24270	Saint-Mesmin
24465	24400	Saint-Michel-de-Double
24466	24230	Saint-Michel-de-Montaigne
24468	24380	Saint-Michel-de-Villadeix
24472	24520	Saint-Nexans
24474	24530	Saint-Pancrace
24476	24160	Saint-Pantaly-d'Excideuil
24477	24600	Saint-Pardoux-de-Drône
24478	24170	Saint-Pardoux-et-Vielvic
24479	24470	Saint-Pardoux-la-Rivière
24480	24380	Saint-Paul-de-Serre
24481	24800	Saint-Paul-la-Roche
24482	24320	Saint-Paul-Lizonne
24483	24560	Saint-Perdoux
24484	24330	Saint-Pierre-de-Chignac
24485	24800	Saint-Pierre-de-Côle
24486	24450	Saint-Pierre-de-Frugie
24487	24130	Saint-Pierre-d'Eyraud
24488	24170	Saint-Pompont
24489	24450	Saint-Priest-les-Fougères
24490	24410	Saint Privat en Périgord
24491	24210	Saint-Rabier
24493	24160	Saint-Raphaël
24494	24700	Saint-Rémy
24495	24540	Saint-Romain-de-Monpazier
24496	24800	Saint-Romain-et-Saint-Clément
24498	24470	Saint-Saud-Lacoussière
24499	24520	Saint-Sauveur
24500	24700	Saint-Sauveur-Lalande
24501	24230	Saint-Seurin-de-Prats
24502	24190	Saint-Séverin-d'Estissac
24504	24600	Saint-Sulpice-de-Roumagnac
24505	24800	Saint-Sulpice-d'Excideuil
24508	24350	Saint-Victor
24509	24190	Saint-Vincent-de-Connezac
24510	24220	Saint-Vincent-de-Cosse
24511	24410	Saint-Vincent-Jalmoutiers
24512	24200	Saint-Vincent-le-Paluel
24513	24420	Saint-Vincent-sur-l'Isle
24514	24230	Saint-Vivien
24515	24160	Salagnac
24516	24590	Salignac-Eyvigues
24517	24170	Salles-de-Belvès
24518	24380	Salon
24312	24660	Sanilhac
24519	24270	Sarlande
24520	24200	Sarlat-la-Canéda
24521	24420	Sarliac-sur-l'Isle
24522	24800	Sarrazac
24523	24240	Saussignac
24524	24260	Savignac-de-Miremont
24525	24300	Savignac-de-Nontron
24526	24270	Savignac-Lédrier
24527	24420	Savignac-les-Églises
24528	24300	Sceau-Saint-Angel
24529	24600	Segonzac
24531	24290	Sergeac
24532	24500	Serres-et-Montguyard
24533	24410	Servanches
24534	24240	Sigoulès-et-Flaugeac
24535	24370	Simeyrols
24536	24500	Singleyrac
24537	24600	Siorac-de-Ribérac
24538	24170	Siorac-en-Périgord
24540	24420	Sorges et Ligueux en Périgord
24541	24360	Soudat
24542	24540	Soulaures
24543	24400	Sourzac
24544	24620	Tamniès
24545	24390	Teillots
24546	24390	Temple-Laguyon
24547	24120	Terrasson-Lavilledieu
24548	24300	Teyjat
24549	24240	Thénac
24550	24210	Thenon
24551	24800	Thiviers
24552	24290	Thonac
24553	24350	Tocane-Saint-Apre
24554	24320	La Tour-Blanche-Cercles
24555	24390	Tourtoirac
24557	24750	Trélissac
24558	24510	Trémolat
24559	24620	Tursac
24560	24480	Urval
24362	24510	Val de Louyre et Caudeau
24562	24190	Vallereuil
24563	24290	Valojoulx
24564	24600	Vanxains
24565	24360	Varaignes
24566	24150	Varennes
24567	24800	Vaunac
24568	24230	Vélines
24569	24320	Vendoire
24570	24520	Verdon
24571	24380	Vergt
24572	24540	Vergt-de-Biron
24573	24320	Verteillac
24574	24370	Veyrignac
24575	24250	Veyrines-de-Domme
24576	24380	Veyrines-de-Vergt
24577	24220	Vézac
24580	24120	Villac
24581	24140	Villamblard
24582	24530	Villars
24584	24610	Villefranche-de-Lonchat
24585	24550	Villefranche-du-Périgord
24586	24600	Villetoureix
24587	24200	Vitrac
