= Lusignac =

- Commune
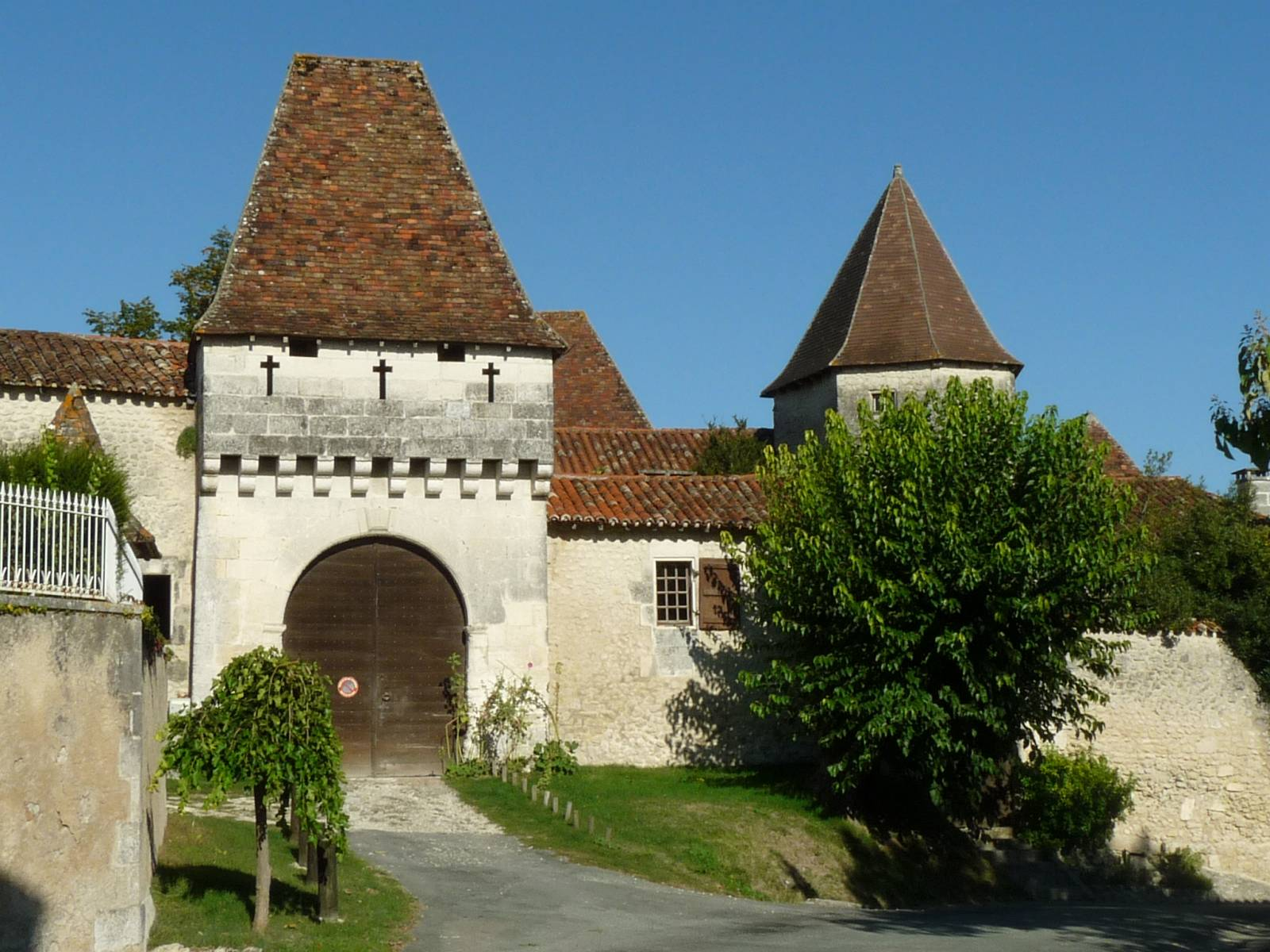
- Chateau

- Coat of arms
- Location of Lusignac
- Location within France Location within Nouvelle-Aquitaine
- Coordinates: 45°19′41″N 0°18′45″E
- Country: France
- Region: Nouvelle-Aquitaine
- Department: Dordogne
- Arrondissement: Périgueux
- Canton: Ribérac

Government
  - Mayor (2020–2026): Ludovic Gillaizeau
- Area^{1}: 7.88 km^{2} (3.04 sq mi)
- Elevation: 150 m (490 ft)
- Highest elevation: 184 m (604 ft)
- Lowest elevation: 62 m (203 ft)
- Population (2023): 162
  - Density: 20.6/km^{2} (53.2/sq mi)
- Time zone: UTC+01:00 (CET)
  - Summer (DST): UTC+02:00 (CEST)
- INSEE/Postal code: 24247 /24320
- ^{1} French Land Register data, which excludes lakes, ponds, glaciers > 1 km^{2} (0.386 sq mi or 247 acres) and river estuaries.

Lusignac (French pronunciation: [lyziɲak]; Occitan: Lusinhac) is a commune in the Dordogne department in Nouvelle-Aquitaine in southwestern France.

== Population ==
Historical population
Year	Pop.	±% p.a.
1968	210	—
1975	201	−0.62%
1982	192	−0.65%
1990	192	+0.00%
1999	185	−0.41%
2007	185	+0.00%
2012	190	+0.53%
2017	180	−1.08%
2023	162	−1.74%
Source: INSEE

== See also ==
- Communes of the Dordogne department
