= Saint-Martial-Viveyrol =

- Commune
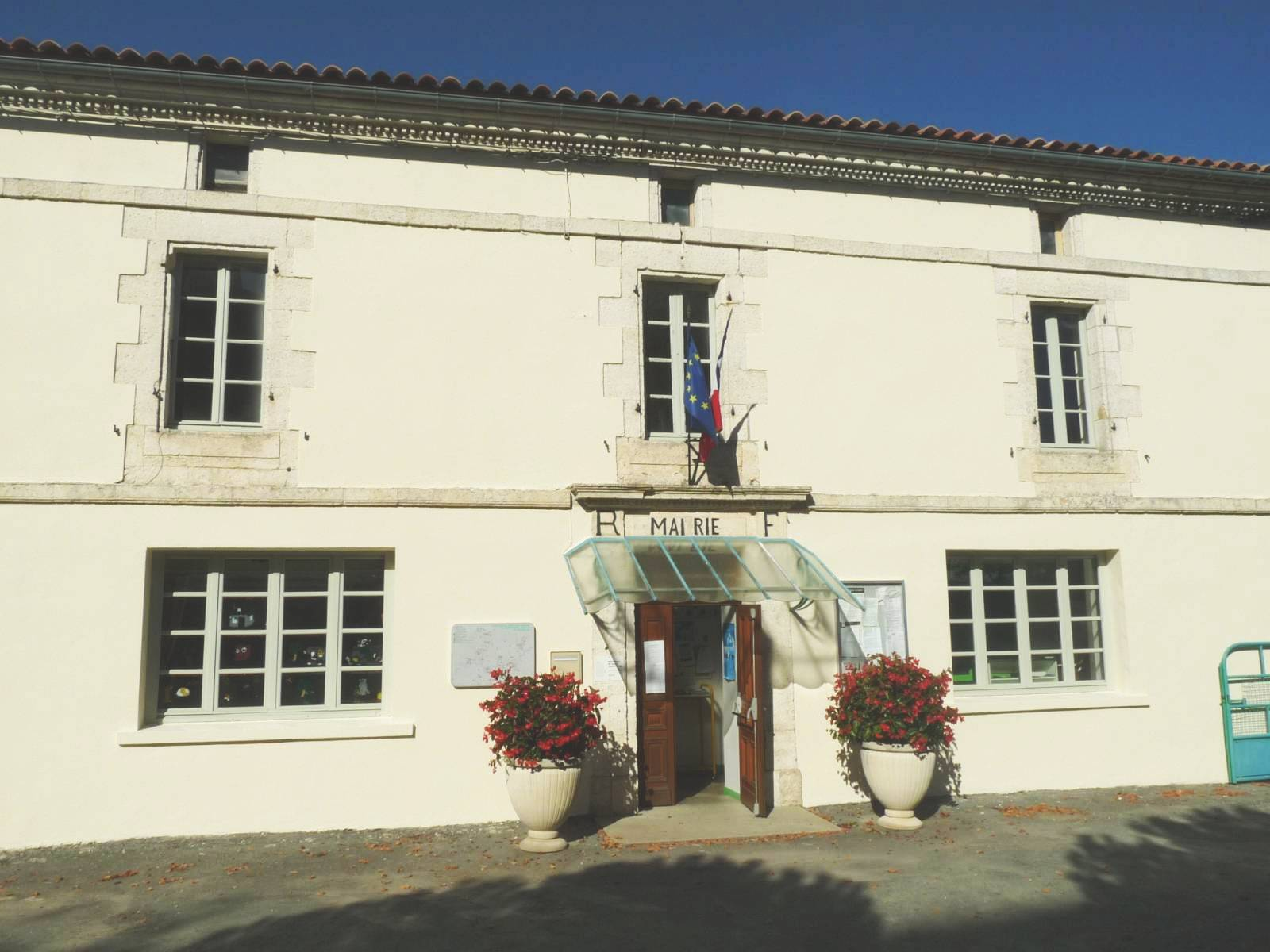
- The town hall in Saint-Martial-Viveyrol
- Location of Saint-Martial-Viveyrol
- Location within France Location within Nouvelle-Aquitaine
- Coordinates: 45°21′30″N 0°20′22″E
- Country: France
- Region: Nouvelle-Aquitaine
- Department: Dordogne
- Arrondissement: Périgueux
- Canton: Ribérac

Government
  - Mayor (2020–2026): Virginie Mouche
- Area^{1}: 12.63 km^{2} (4.88 sq mi)
- Elevation: 112 m (367 ft)
- Highest elevation: 193 m (633 ft)
- Lowest elevation: 79 m (259 ft)
- Population (2023): 184
  - Density: 14.6/km^{2} (37.7/sq mi)
- Time zone: UTC+01:00 (CET)
  - Summer (DST): UTC+02:00 (CEST)
- INSEE/Postal code: 24452 /24320
- ^{1} French Land Register data, which excludes lakes, ponds, glaciers > 1 km^{2} (0.386 sq mi or 247 acres) and river estuaries.

Saint-Martial-Viveyrol (French pronunciation: [sɛ̃ maʁsjal viveʁɔl]; Occitan: Sent Marçau Vivairòus) is a commune in the Dordogne department in Nouvelle-Aquitaine in southwestern France.

== Population ==
Historical population
Year	Pop.	±% p.a.
1968	318	—
1975	264	−2.62%
1982	271	+0.37%
1990	267	−0.19%
1999	235	−1.41%
2007	229	−0.32%
2012	205	−2.19%
2017	195	−1.00%
2023	184	−0.96%
Source: INSEE

== See also ==
- Communes of the Dordogne department
