= Verteillac =

- Commune
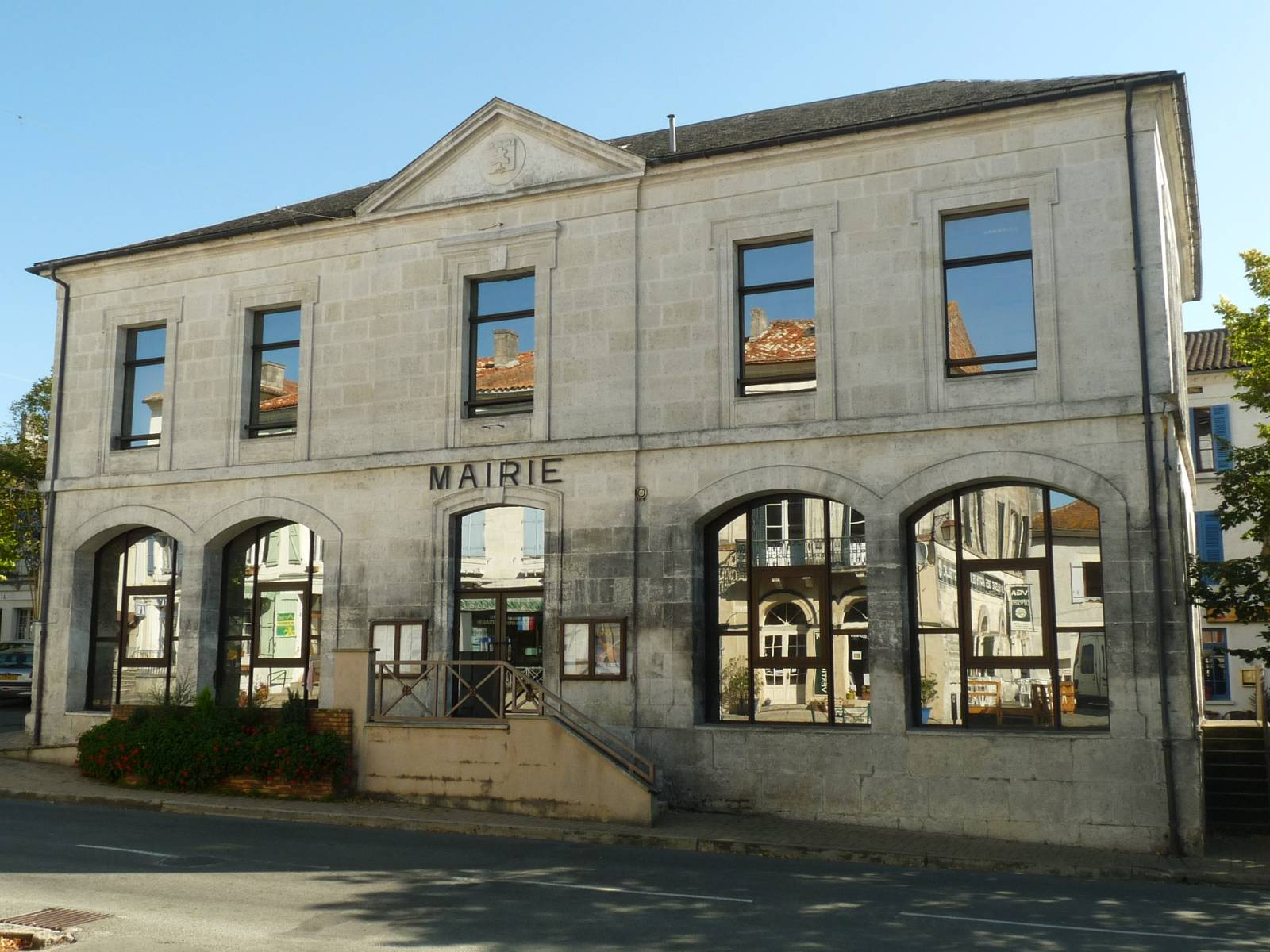
- Town hall

- Coat of arms
- Location of Verteillac
- Location within France Location within Nouvelle-Aquitaine
- Coordinates: 45°20′53″N 0°22′01″E
- Country: France
- Region: Nouvelle-Aquitaine
- Department: Dordogne
- Arrondissement: Périgueux
- Canton: Ribérac
- Intercommunality: Périgord Ribéracois

Government
  - Mayor (2020–2026): Régis Defraye
- Area^{1}: 18.44 km^{2} (7.12 sq mi)
- Elevation: 135 m (443 ft)
- Highest elevation: 187 m (614 ft)
- Lowest elevation: 79 m (259 ft)
- Population (2023): 547
  - Density: 29.7/km^{2} (76.8/sq mi)
- Time zone: UTC+01:00 (CET)
  - Summer (DST): UTC+02:00 (CEST)
- INSEE/Postal code: 24573 /24320
- ^{1} French Land Register data, which excludes lakes, ponds, glaciers > 1 km^{2} (0.386 sq mi or 247 acres) and river estuaries.

Verteillac (French pronunciation: [vɛʁtɛjak]; Occitan: Vertelhac) is a commune in the Dordogne department in Nouvelle-Aquitaine in south-western France. In 2014, the feast of Félibrée was held in Verteillac.

== International relation ==
It is twinned with Fontanetto Po in Italy.

== Population ==
Historical population
Year	Pop.	±% p.a.
1968	655	—
1975	652	−0.07%
1982	724	+1.51%
1990	706	−0.31%
1999	675	−0.50%
2007	645	−0.57%
2012	632	−0.41%
2017	672	+1.23%
2023	547	−3.37%
Source: INSEE

== Sights ==
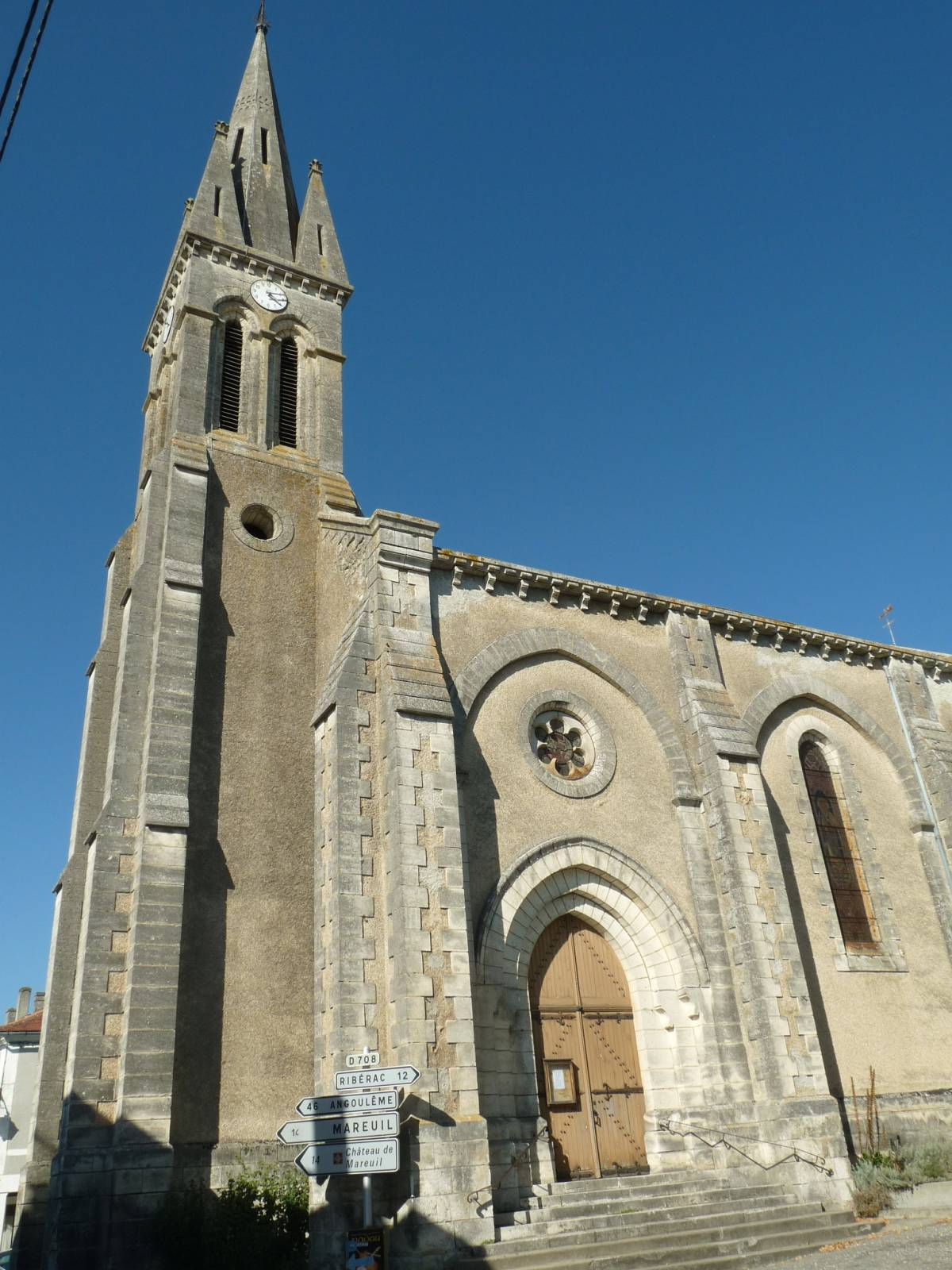
Verteillac church

- Château du Breuil, 16th-17th century
- Château de la Grénerie, 19th century
- Château de la Meyfrenie, 18th-19th century
- Verteillac church

== Shopping ==
Verteillac is a local shopping centre for the nearby villages. It has a general store (Merlaud, which sells everything from lettuce to lawn mowers), butchers, bakers, a brocante, a choice of cafes and restaurants.

== Personalities ==
- Martine Aurillac, députée for Paris, was member of the municipal council of Verteillac from 1971 until 1977.

== See also ==
- Communes of the Dordogne department
- Périgord
