= Vendoire =

- Commune
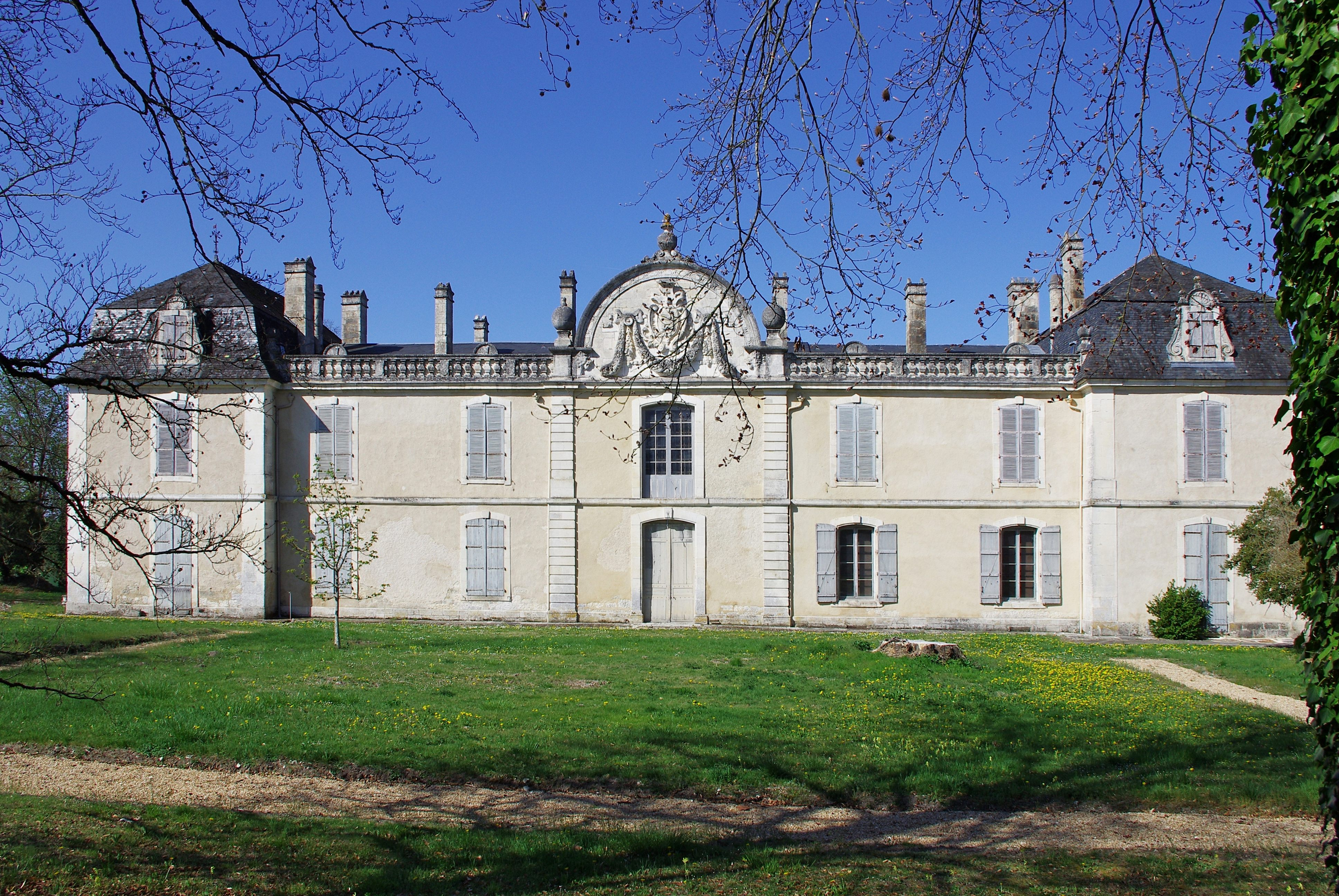
- The chateau in Vendoire
- Location of Vendoire
- Location within France Location within Nouvelle-Aquitaine
- Coordinates: 45°24′58″N 0°18′13″E
- Country: France
- Region: Nouvelle-Aquitaine
- Department: Dordogne
- Arrondissement: Périgueux
- Canton: Ribérac

Government
  - Mayor (2020–2026): Marion Lafaye
- Area^{1}: 11.65 km^{2} (4.50 sq mi)
- Elevation: 130 m (430 ft)
- Highest elevation: 163 m (535 ft)
- Lowest elevation: 70 m (230 ft)
- Population (2023): 135
  - Density: 11.6/km^{2} (30.0/sq mi)
- Time zone: UTC+01:00 (CET)
  - Summer (DST): UTC+02:00 (CEST)
- INSEE/Postal code: 24569 /24320
- ^{1} French Land Register data, which excludes lakes, ponds, glaciers > 1 km^{2} (0.386 sq mi or 247 acres) and river estuaries.

Vendoire (French pronunciation: [vɑ̃dwaʁ]; Occitan: Vendeira) is a commune in the Dordogne department in Nouvelle-Aquitaine in southwestern France.

== Geography ==
The Lizonne forms the commune's northern and western borders.

== Population ==
Historical population
Year	Pop.	±% p.a.
1968	183	—
1975	193	+0.76%
1982	176	−1.31%
1990	185	+0.63%
1999	149	−2.38%
2007	153	+0.33%
2012	152	−0.13%
2017	134	−2.49%
2023	135	+0.12%
Source: INSEE

== See also ==
- Communes of the Dordogne department
