= Chassaignes =

- Commune
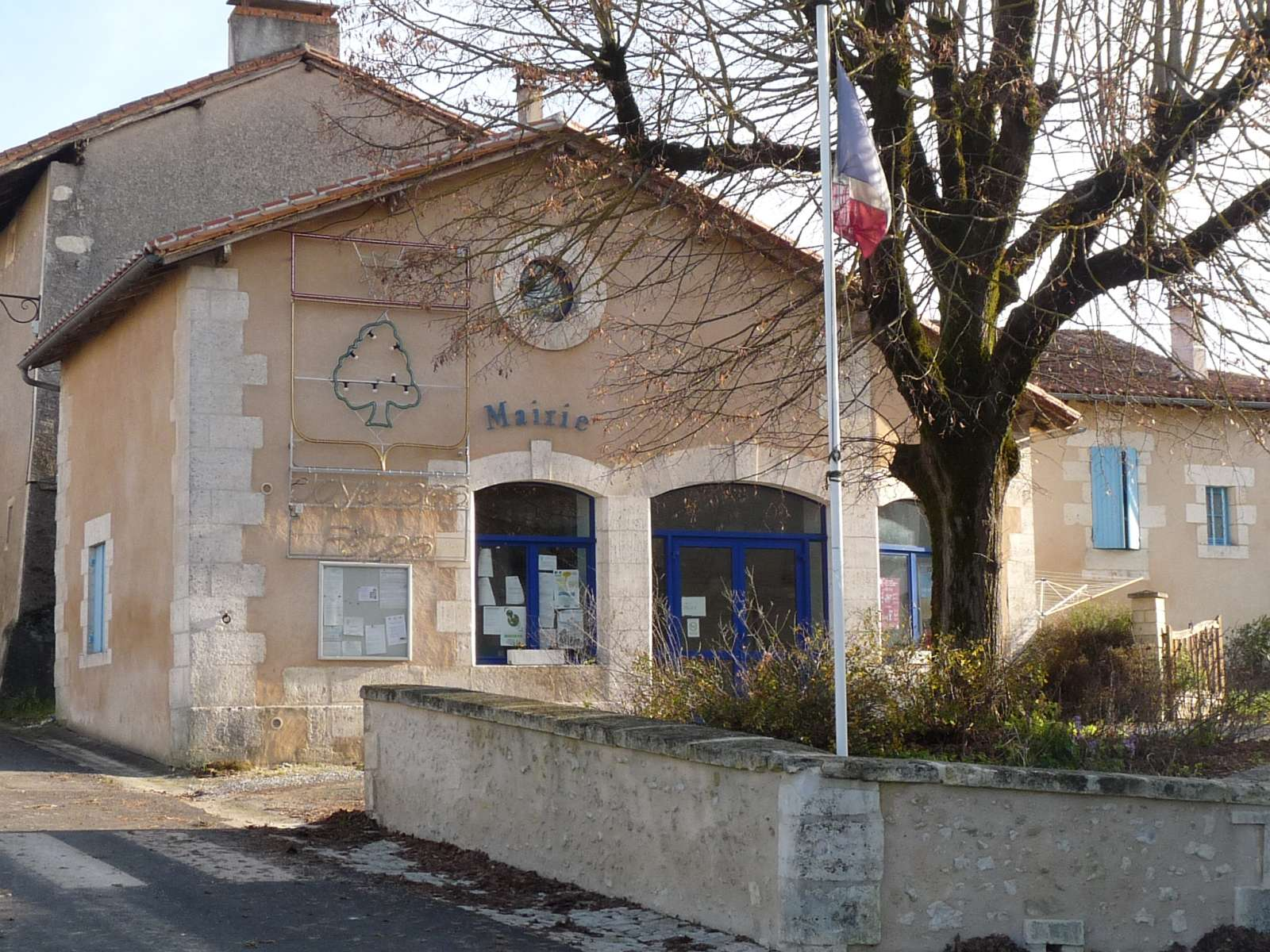
- The town hall in Chassaignes

- Coat of arms
- Location of Chassaignes
- Location within France Location within Nouvelle-Aquitaine
- Coordinates: 45°15′12″N 0°15′13″E
- Country: France
- Region: Nouvelle-Aquitaine
- Department: Dordogne
- Arrondissement: Périgueux
- Canton: Ribérac

Government
  - Mayor (2020–2026): Monique Boineau Serrano
- Area^{1}: 5.79 km^{2} (2.24 sq mi)
- Elevation: 110 m (360 ft)
- Highest elevation: 116 m (381 ft)
- Lowest elevation: 58 m (190 ft)
- Population (2023): 78
  - Density: 13/km^{2} (35/sq mi)
- Time zone: UTC+01:00 (CET)
  - Summer (DST): UTC+02:00 (CEST)
- INSEE/Postal code: 24114 /24600
- ^{1} French Land Register data, which excludes lakes, ponds, glaciers > 1 km^{2} (0.386 sq mi or 247 acres) and river estuaries.

Chassaignes (French pronunciation: [ʃasɛɲ]; Occitan: Chassanhas) is a commune in the Dordogne department in Nouvelle-Aquitaine in southwestern France.

== Population ==
Historical population
Year	Pop.	±% p.a.
1968	123	—
1975	94	−3.77%
1982	81	−2.10%
1990	71	−1.63%
1999	90	+2.67%
2007	82	−1.16%
2012	74	−2.03%
2017	68	−1.68%
2023	78	+2.31%
Source: INSEE

== See also ==
- Communes of the Dordogne department
