= La Chapelle-Montabourlet =

- Commune
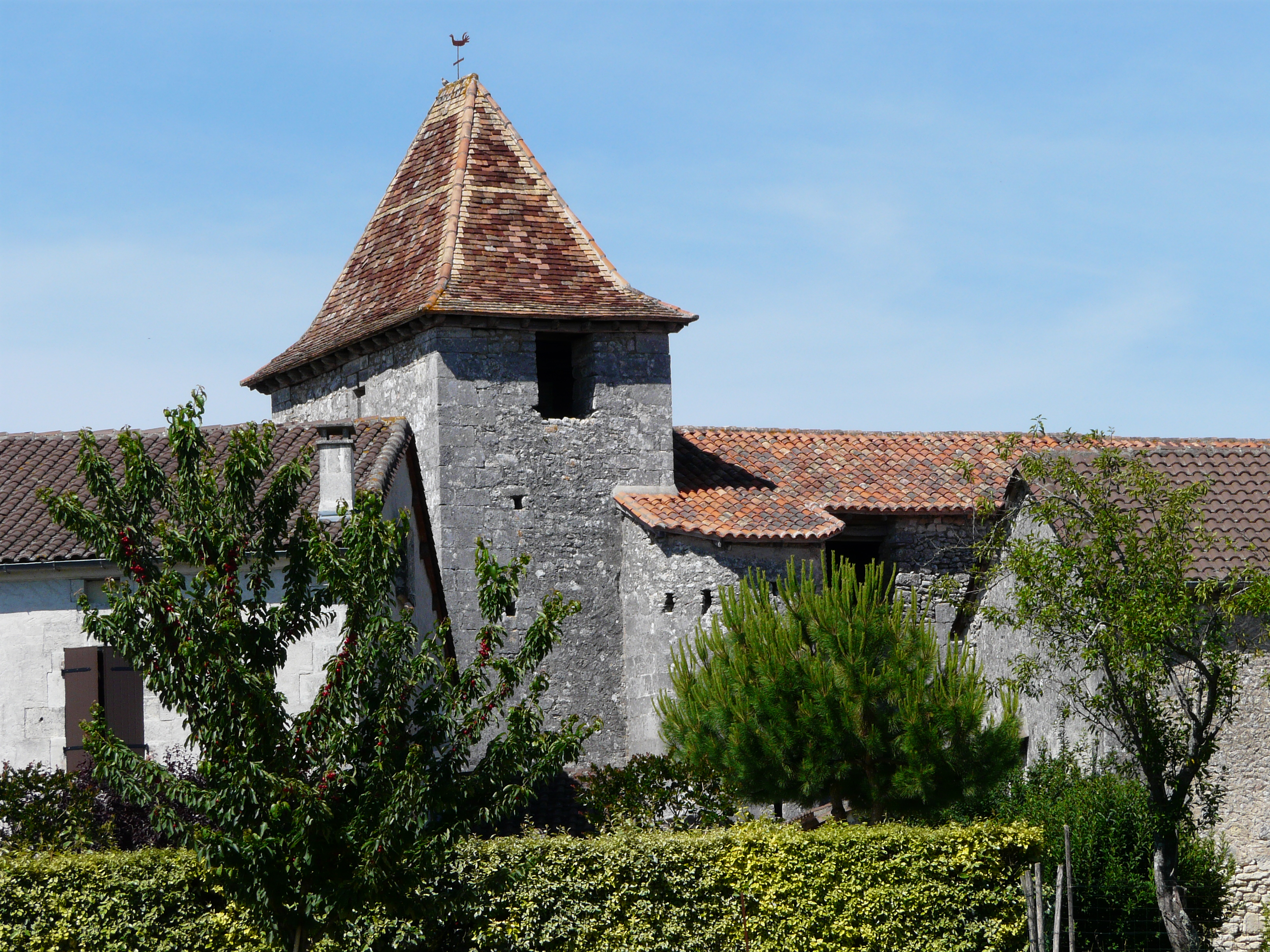
- The church in La Chapelle-Montabourlet
- Location of La Chapelle-Montabourlet
- Location within France Location within Nouvelle-Aquitaine
- Coordinates: 45°23′39″N 0°27′51″E
- Country: France
- Region: Nouvelle-Aquitaine
- Department: Dordogne
- Arrondissement: Périgueux
- Canton: Ribérac

Government
  - Mayor (2020–2026): Alfred Gonnard
- Area^{1}: 5.77 km^{2} (2.23 sq mi)
- Elevation: 190 m (620 ft)
- Highest elevation: 197 m (646 ft)
- Lowest elevation: 148 m (486 ft)
- Population (2023): 56
  - Density: 9.7/km^{2} (25/sq mi)
- Time zone: UTC+01:00 (CET)
  - Summer (DST): UTC+02:00 (CEST)
- INSEE/Postal code: 24110 /24320
- ^{1} French Land Register data, which excludes lakes, ponds, glaciers > 1 km^{2} (0.386 sq mi or 247 acres) and river estuaries.

La Chapelle-Montabourlet is a commune in the Dordogne department in Nouvelle-Aquitaine in southwestern France.

== Population ==
Historical population
Year	Pop.	±% p.a.
1968	97	—
1975	72	−4.17%
1982	79	+1.33%
1990	85	+0.92%
1999	80	−0.67%
2007	68	−2.01%
2012	70	+0.58%
2017	62	−2.40%
2023	56	−1.68%
Source: INSEE

== See also ==
- Communes of the Dordogne department
