= La Chapelle-Grésignac =

- Commune
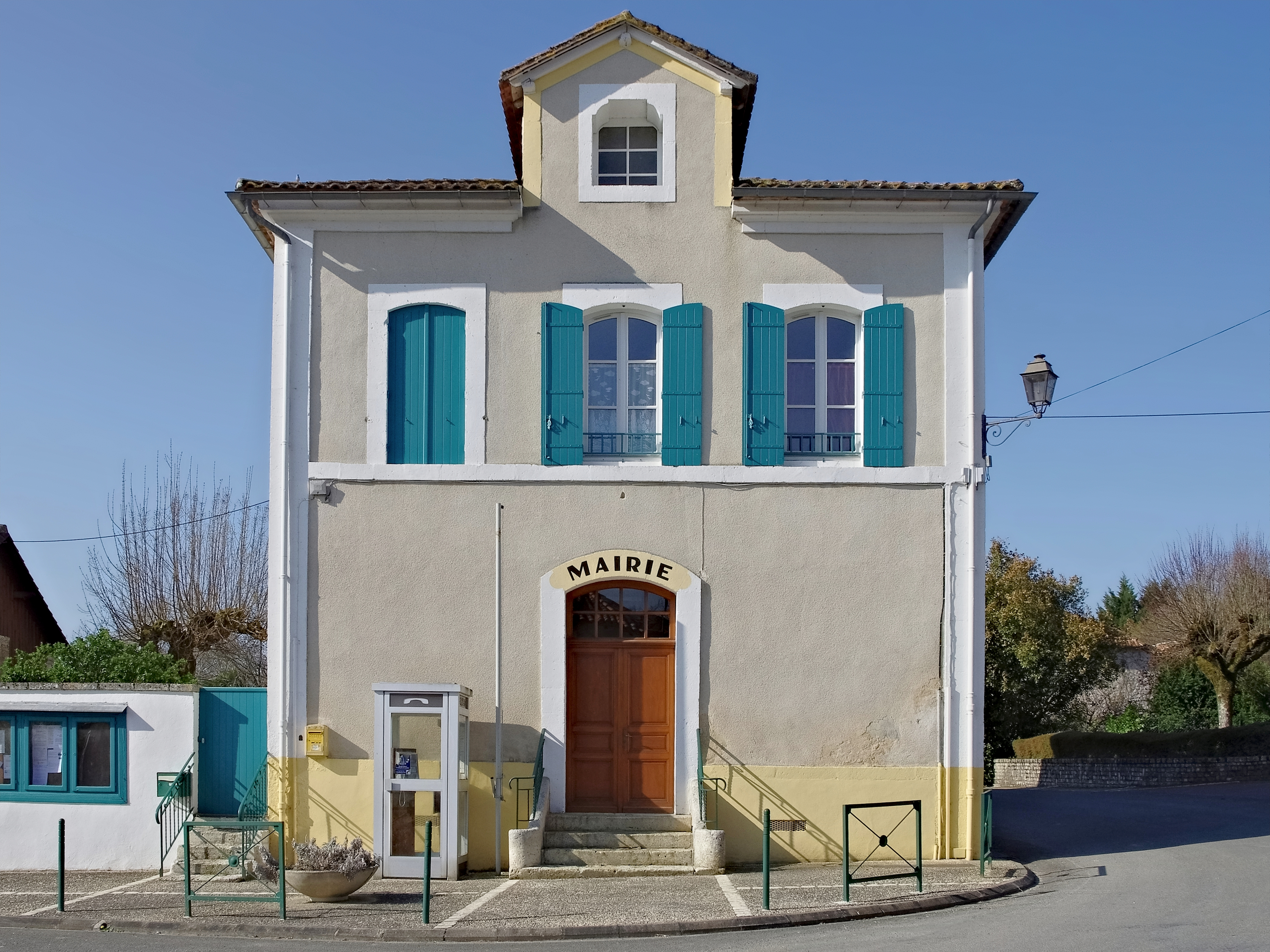
- The town hall in La Chapelle-Grésignac
- Location of La Chapelle-Grésignac
- Location within France Location within Nouvelle-Aquitaine
- Coordinates: 45°23′40″N 0°20′18″E
- Country: France
- Region: Nouvelle-Aquitaine
- Department: Dordogne
- Arrondissement: Périgueux
- Canton: Ribérac

Government
  - Mayor (2020–2026): Patrick Beau
- Area^{1}: 6.95 km^{2} (2.68 sq mi)
- Elevation: 125 m (410 ft)
- Highest elevation: 174 m (571 ft)
- Lowest elevation: 78 m (256 ft)
- Population (2023): 103
  - Density: 14.8/km^{2} (38.4/sq mi)
- Time zone: UTC+01:00 (CET)
  - Summer (DST): UTC+02:00 (CEST)
- INSEE/Postal code: 24109 /24320
- ^{1} French Land Register data, which excludes lakes, ponds, glaciers > 1 km^{2} (0.386 sq mi or 247 acres) and river estuaries.

La Chapelle-Grésignac (French pronunciation: [la ʃapel ɡʁeziɲak]; Occitan: La Chapela de Gresinhac) is a commune in the Dordogne department in Nouvelle-Aquitaine in southwestern France.

== Population ==
Historical population
Year	Pop.	±% p.a.
1968	165	—
1975	146	−1.73%
1982	136	−1.01%
1990	126	−0.95%
1999	112	−1.30%
2007	139	+2.74%
2012	115	−3.72%
2017	108	−1.25%
2023	103	−0.79%
Source: INSEE

== See also ==
- Communes of the Dordogne department
