= Bertric-Burée =

- Commune
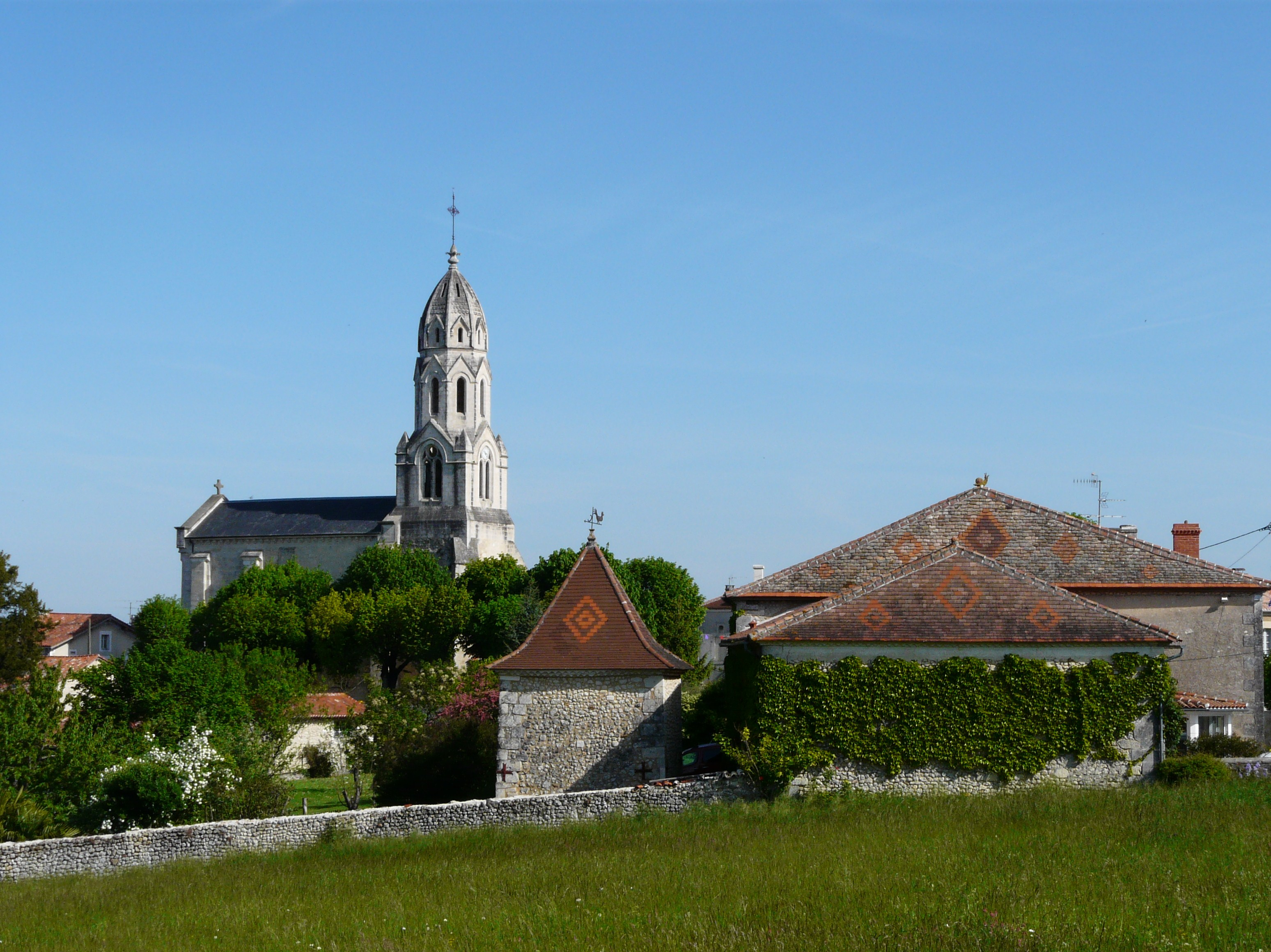
- A general view of Bertric-Burée
- Location of Bertric-Burée
- Location within France Location within Nouvelle-Aquitaine
- Coordinates: 45°18′21″N 0°21′29″E
- Country: France
- Region: Nouvelle-Aquitaine
- Department: Dordogne
- Arrondissement: Périgueux
- Canton: Ribérac

Government
  - Mayor (2020–2026): Jean-Pierre Prigul
- Area^{1}: 16.73 km^{2} (6.46 sq mi)
- Elevation: 174 m (571 ft)
- Highest elevation: 181 m (594 ft)
- Lowest elevation: 68 m (223 ft)
- Population (2023): 445
  - Density: 26.6/km^{2} (68.9/sq mi)
- Time zone: UTC+01:00 (CET)
  - Summer (DST): UTC+02:00 (CEST)
- INSEE/Postal code: 24038 /24320
- ^{1} French Land Register data, which excludes lakes, ponds, glaciers > 1 km^{2} (0.386 sq mi or 247 acres) and river estuaries.

Bertric-Burée (French pronunciation: [bɛʁtʁik byʁe]; Occitan: Bertric e Burèia) is a commune in the Dordogne department in southwestern France. In July 2022, a street was named ruelle Gary Gygax, after one of the inventors of Dungeons and Dragons.

== Population ==
Historical population
| Year | Pop. | ±% p.a. |
|---|---|---|
| 1968 | 330 | — |
| 1975 | 308 | −0.98% |
| 1982 | 314 | +0.28% |
| 1990 | 340 | +1.00% |
| 1999 | 393 | +1.62% |
| 2007 | 407 | +0.44% |
| 2012 | 444 | +1.76% |
| 2017 | 440 | −0.18% |
| 2023 | 445 | +0.19% |
Source: INSEE

== See also ==
- Communes of the Dordogne département
