= Saint-Méard-de-Drône =

- Commune
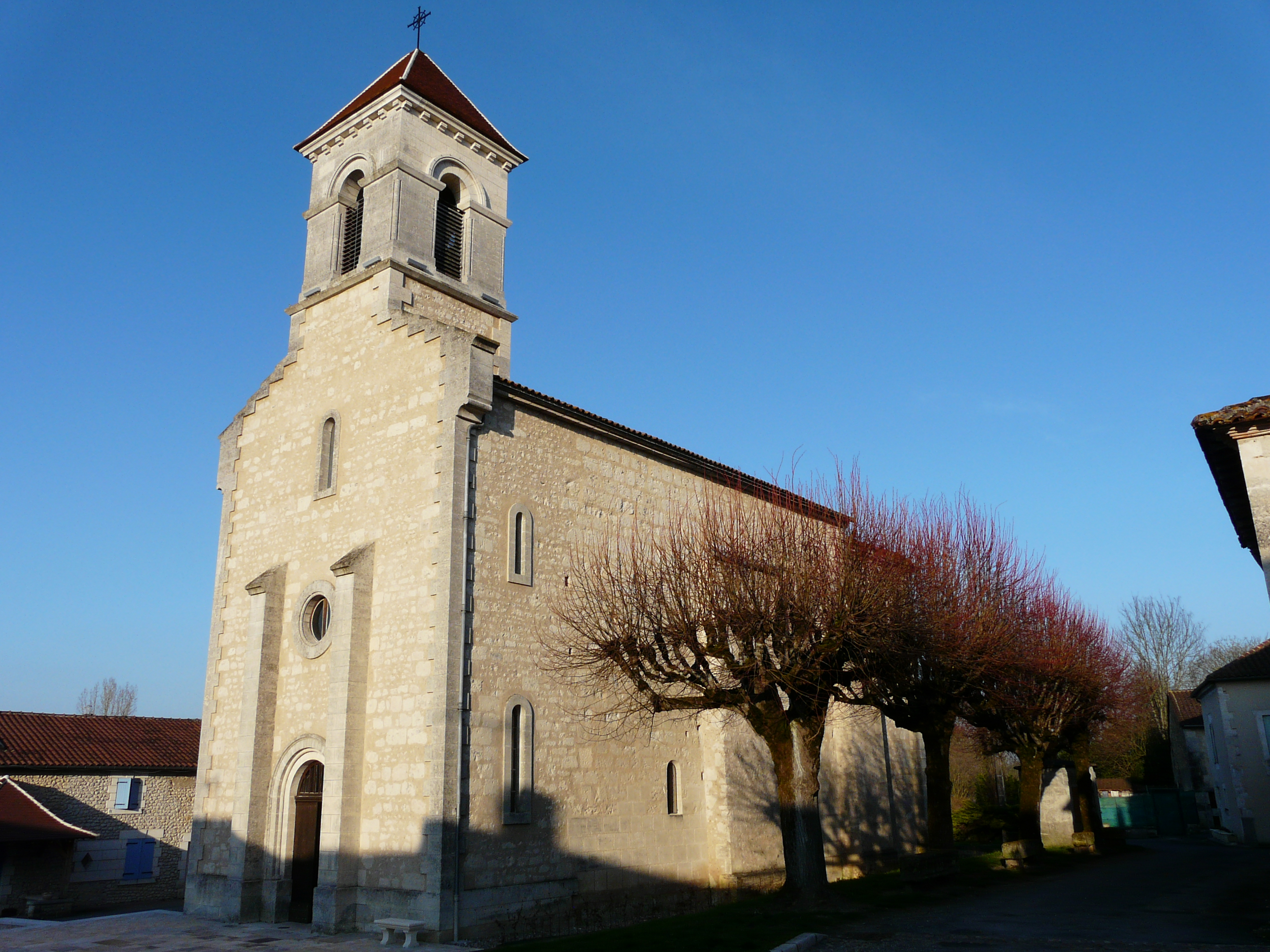
- The church in Saint-Méard-de-Drône
- Location of Saint-Méard-de-Drône
- Location within France Location within Nouvelle-Aquitaine
- Coordinates: 45°15′00″N 0°25′22″E
- Country: France
- Region: Nouvelle-Aquitaine
- Department: Dordogne
- Arrondissement: Périgueux
- Canton: Ribérac

Government
  - Mayor (2020–2026): Gérard Caignard
- Area^{1}: 8.95 km^{2} (3.46 sq mi)
- Elevation: 69 m (226 ft)
- Highest elevation: 145 m (476 ft)
- Lowest elevation: 60 m (200 ft)
- Population (2023): 485
  - Density: 54.2/km^{2} (140/sq mi)
- Time zone: UTC+01:00 (CET)
  - Summer (DST): UTC+02:00 (CEST)
- INSEE/Postal code: 24460 /24600
- ^{1} French Land Register data, which excludes lakes, ponds, glaciers > 1 km^{2} (0.386 sq mi or 247 acres) and river estuaries.

Saint-Méard-de-Drône (French pronunciation: [sɛ̃ meaʁ də dʁon], literally Saint-Méard of Drône; Limousin: Sent Meard de Drona) is a commune in the Dordogne department in Nouvelle-Aquitaine in southwestern France.

== Population ==
Historical population
Year	Pop.	±% p.a.
1968	327	—
1975	364	+1.54%
1982	403	+1.46%
1990	451	+1.42%
1999	433	−0.45%
2007	465	+0.90%
2012	485	+0.85%
2017	497	+0.49%
2023	485	−0.41%
Source: INSEE

== See also ==
- Communes of the Dordogne department
