= Coutures, Dordogne =

Coutures
- Commune
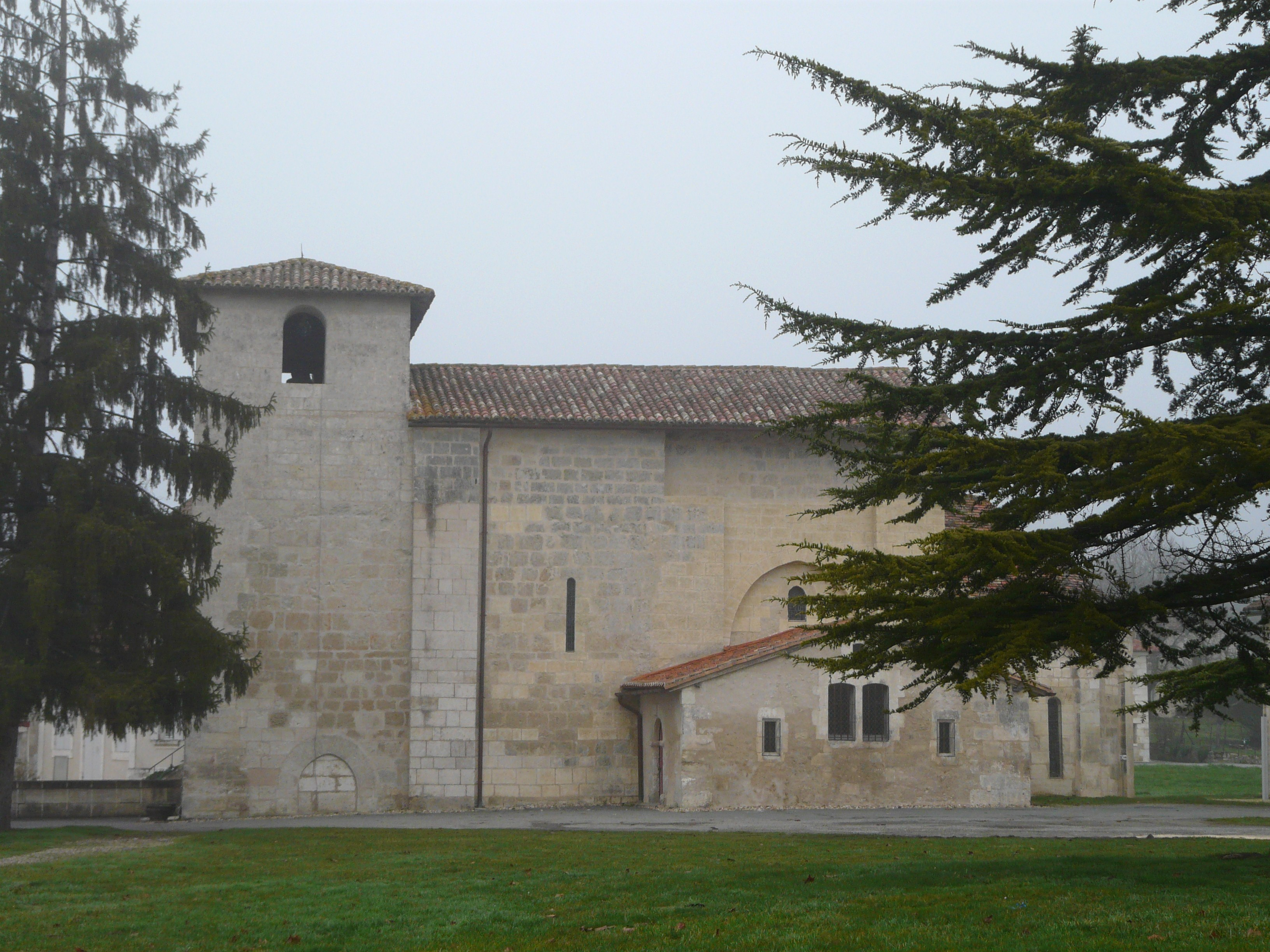
- The church in Coutures

- Coat of arms
- Location of Coutures
- Location within France Location within Nouvelle-Aquitaine
- Coordinates: 45°19′58″N 0°23′37″E
- Country: France
- Region: Nouvelle-Aquitaine
- Department: Dordogne
- Arrondissement: Périgueux
- Canton: Ribérac

Government
  - Mayor (2020–2026): Didier Bazinet
- Area^{1}: 8.53 km^{2} (3.29 sq mi)
- Elevation: 149 m (489 ft)
- Highest elevation: 213 m (699 ft)
- Lowest elevation: 99 m (325 ft)
- Population (2023): 199
  - Density: 23.3/km^{2} (60.4/sq mi)
- Time zone: UTC+01:00 (CET)
  - Summer (DST): UTC+02:00 (CEST)
- INSEE/Postal code: 24141 /24320
- ^{1} French Land Register data, which excludes lakes, ponds, glaciers > 1 km^{2} (0.386 sq mi or 247 acres) and river estuaries.

Coutures (French pronunciation: [kutyʁ]; Occitan: Coturas) is a commune in the Dordogne department in Nouvelle-Aquitaine in southwestern France.

== Population ==
Historical population
Year	Pop.	±% p.a.
1968	194	—
1975	153	−3.33%
1982	159	+0.55%
1990	175	+1.21%
1999	174	−0.06%
2007	188	+0.97%
2012	194	+0.63%
2017	185	−0.95%
2023	199	+1.22%
Source: INSEE

== See also ==
- Communes of the Dordogne department
