= Château du Bourbet =

Château in Nouvelle-Aquitaine, France

Coordinates: 45°24′09″N 0°21′43″E

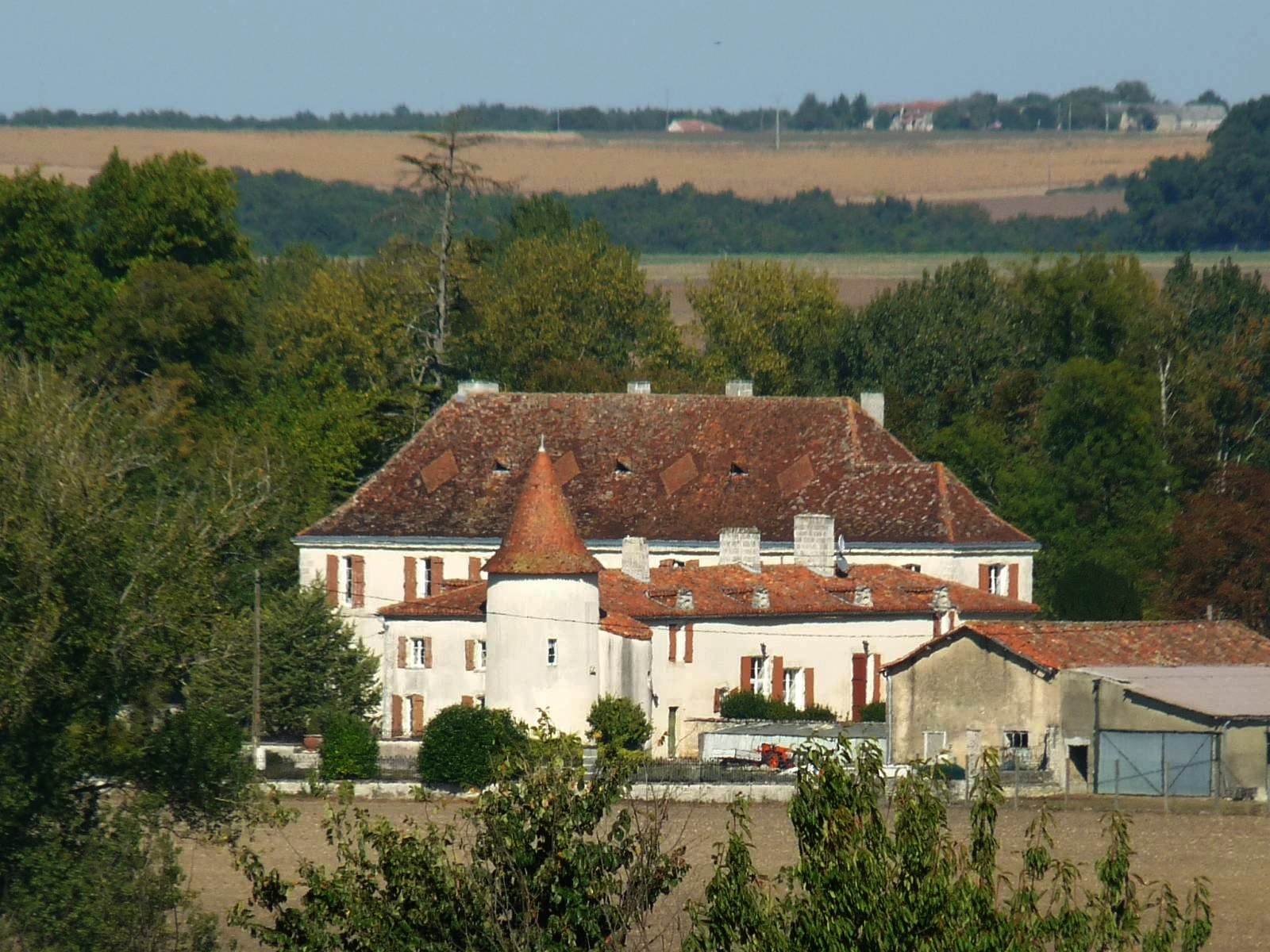

Château du Bourbet is a château in Dordogne, Nouvelle-Aquitaine, France.
