= Bourg-du-Bost =

- Commune
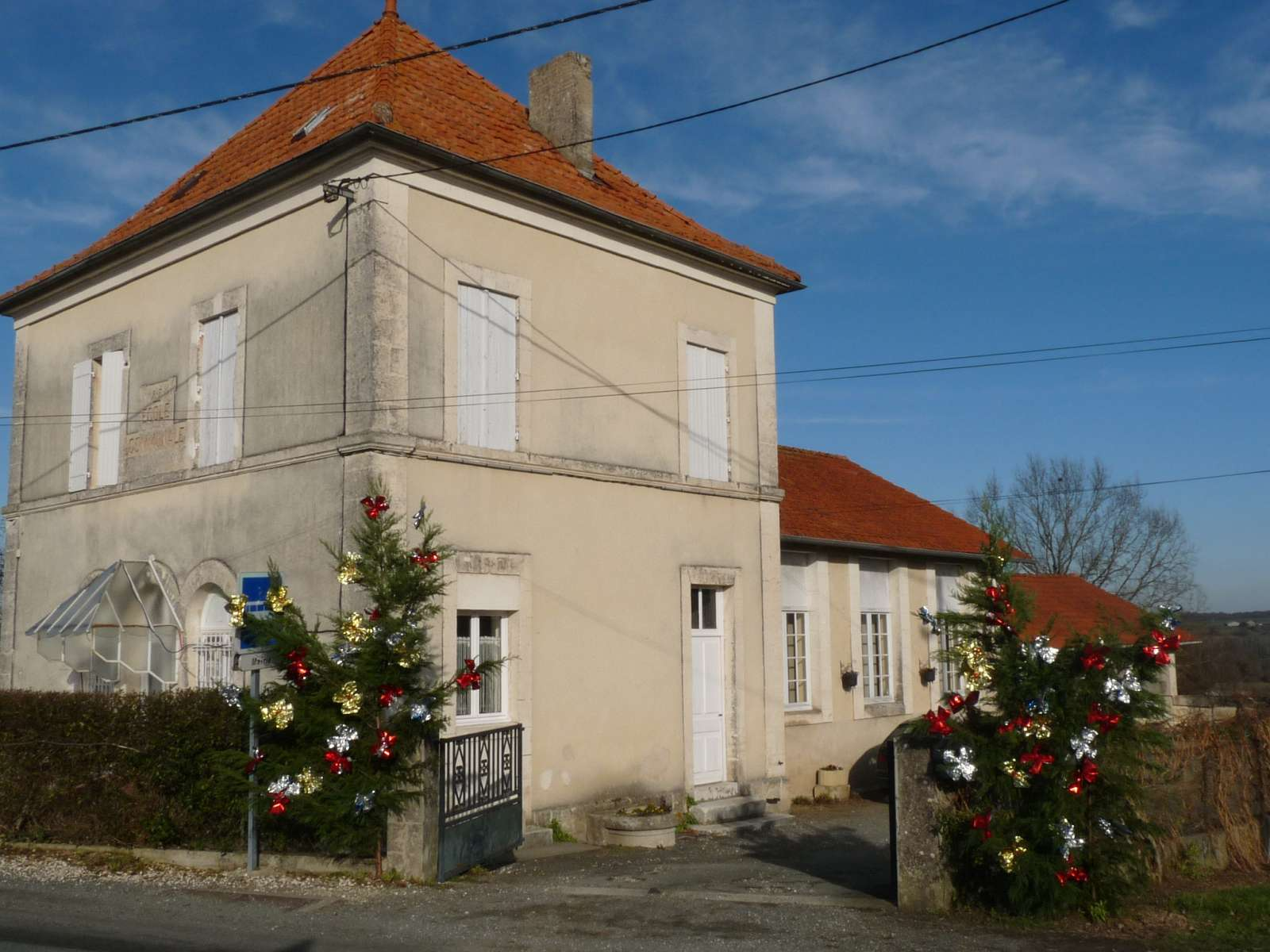
- The town hall in Bourg-du-Bost
- Location of Bourg-du-Bost
- Location within France Location within Nouvelle-Aquitaine
- Coordinates: 45°16′19″N 0°15′29″E
- Country: France
- Region: Nouvelle-Aquitaine
- Department: Dordogne
- Arrondissement: Périgueux
- Canton: Ribérac
- Intercommunality: Périgord Ribéracois

Government
  - Mayor (2020–2026): Janick Laville
- Area^{1}: 7.16 km^{2} (2.76 sq mi)
- Elevation: 86 m (282 ft)
- Highest elevation: 116 m (381 ft)
- Lowest elevation: 47 m (154 ft)
- Population (2023): 247
  - Density: 34.5/km^{2} (89.3/sq mi)
- Time zone: UTC+01:00 (CET)
  - Summer (DST): UTC+02:00 (CEST)
- INSEE/Postal code: 24058 /24600
- ^{1} French Land Register data, which excludes lakes, ponds, glaciers > 1 km^{2} (0.386 sq mi or 247 acres) and river estuaries.

Bourg-du-Bost (French pronunciation: [buʁ dy bo]; Occitan: Lo Borg dau Bòsc meaning "the woods village") is a commune in the Dordogne department in southwestern France.

== Population ==
Historical population
Year	Pop.	±% p.a.
1968	195	—
1975	185	−0.75%
1982	188	+0.23%
1990	174	−0.96%
1999	200	+1.56%
2007	231	+1.82%
2012	239	+0.68%
2017	225	−1.20%
2023	247	+1.57%
Source: INSEE

== See also ==
- Communes of the Dordogne département
