= Saint-André-de-Double =

- Commune
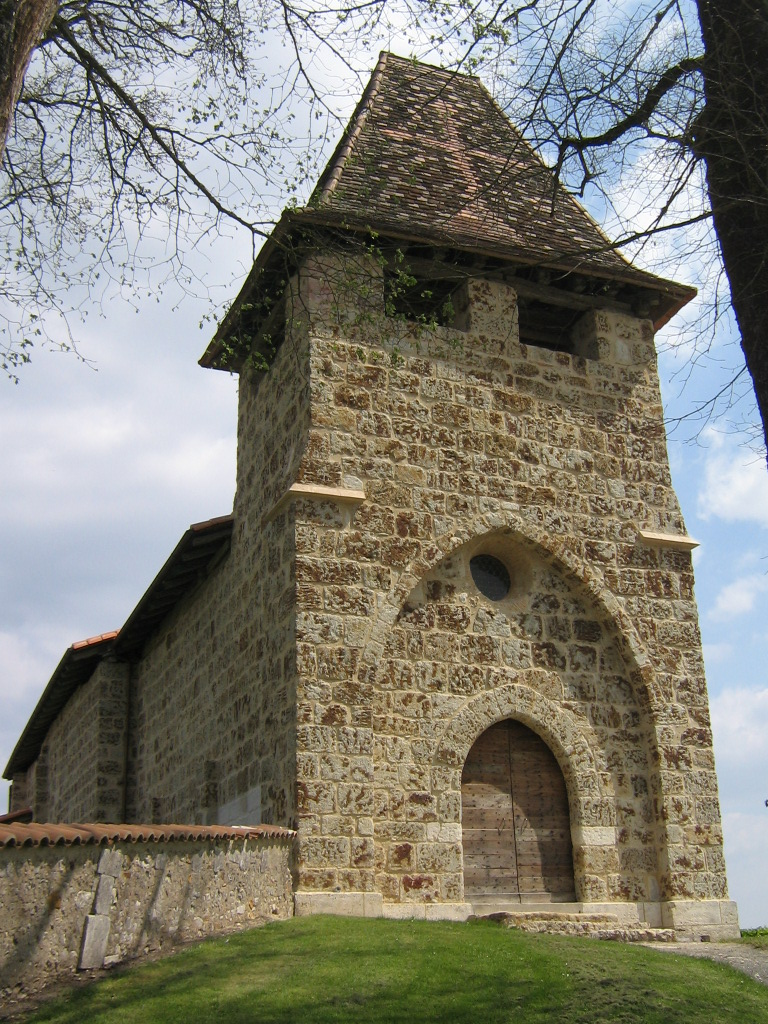
- The church in Saint-André-de-Double
- Location of Saint-André-de-Double
- Location within France Location within Nouvelle-Aquitaine
- Coordinates: 45°08′48″N 0°19′08″E
- Country: France
- Region: Nouvelle-Aquitaine
- Department: Dordogne
- Arrondissement: Périgueux
- Canton: Ribérac

Government
  - Mayor (2020–2026): Pierre Guigné
- Area^{1}: 27.61 km^{2} (10.66 sq mi)
- Elevation: 138 m (453 ft)
- Highest elevation: 144 m (472 ft)
- Lowest elevation: 73 m (240 ft)
- Population (2023): 162
  - Density: 5.87/km^{2} (15.2/sq mi)
- Time zone: UTC+01:00 (CET)
  - Summer (DST): UTC+02:00 (CEST)
- INSEE/Postal code: 24367 /24190
- ^{1} French Land Register data, which excludes lakes, ponds, glaciers > 1 km^{2} (0.386 sq mi or 247 acres) and river estuaries.

Saint-André-de-Double (French pronunciation: [sɛ̃.t‿ɑ̃dʁe də dubl]; Occitan: Sent Andriu de Dobla) is a commune in the Dordogne department in Nouvelle-Aquitaine in southwestern France.

== Population ==
Historical population
Year	Pop.	±% p.a.
1968	218	—
1975	196	−1.51%
1982	178	−1.37%
1990	176	−0.14%
1999	147	−1.98%
2007	155	+0.66%
2012	164	+1.14%
2017	173	+1.07%
2023	162	−1.09%
Source: INSEE

== See also ==
- Communes of the Dordogne department
