= Petit-Bersac =

- Commune
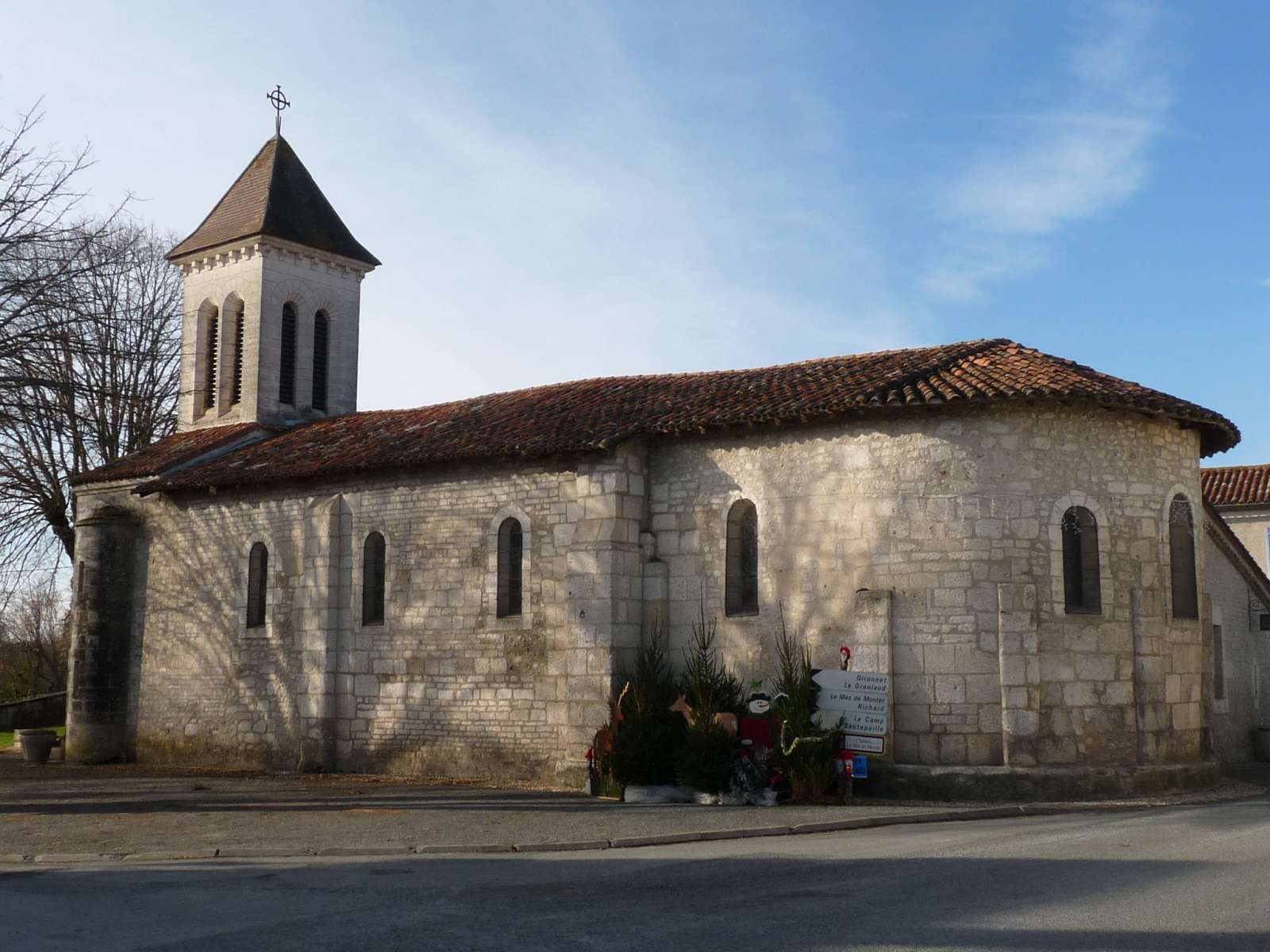
- The church in Petit-Bersac

- Coat of arms
- Location of Petit-Bersac
- Location within France Location within Nouvelle-Aquitaine
- Coordinates: 45°17′21″N 0°13′58″E
- Country: France
- Region: Nouvelle-Aquitaine
- Department: Dordogne
- Arrondissement: Périgueux
- Canton: Ribérac
- Intercommunality: Périgord Ribéracois

Government
  - Mayor (2020–2026): Gilles Mercier
- Area^{1}: 10.83 km^{2} (4.18 sq mi)
- Elevation: 55 m (180 ft)
- Highest elevation: 118 m (387 ft)
- Lowest elevation: 43 m (141 ft)
- Population (2023): 184
  - Density: 17.0/km^{2} (44.0/sq mi)
- Time zone: UTC+01:00 (CET)
  - Summer (DST): UTC+02:00 (CEST)
- INSEE/Postal code: 24323 /24600
- ^{1} French Land Register data, which excludes lakes, ponds, glaciers > 1 km^{2} (0.386 sq mi or 247 acres) and river estuaries.

Petit-Bersac (French pronunciation: [pəti bɛʁsak]; Occitan: Pitit Braçac) is a commune in the Dordogne department in Nouvelle-Aquitaine in southwestern France.

== Population ==
Historical population
Year	Pop.	±% p.a.
1968	231	—
1975	204	−1.76%
1982	206	+0.14%
1990	210	+0.24%
1999	195	−0.82%
2007	175	−1.34%
2012	173	−0.23%
2017	181	+0.91%
2023	184	+0.27%
Source: INSEE

== See also ==
- Communes of the Dordogne department
