= Église-Neuve-d'Issac =

Commune in Nouvelle-Aquitaine, France

- Commune
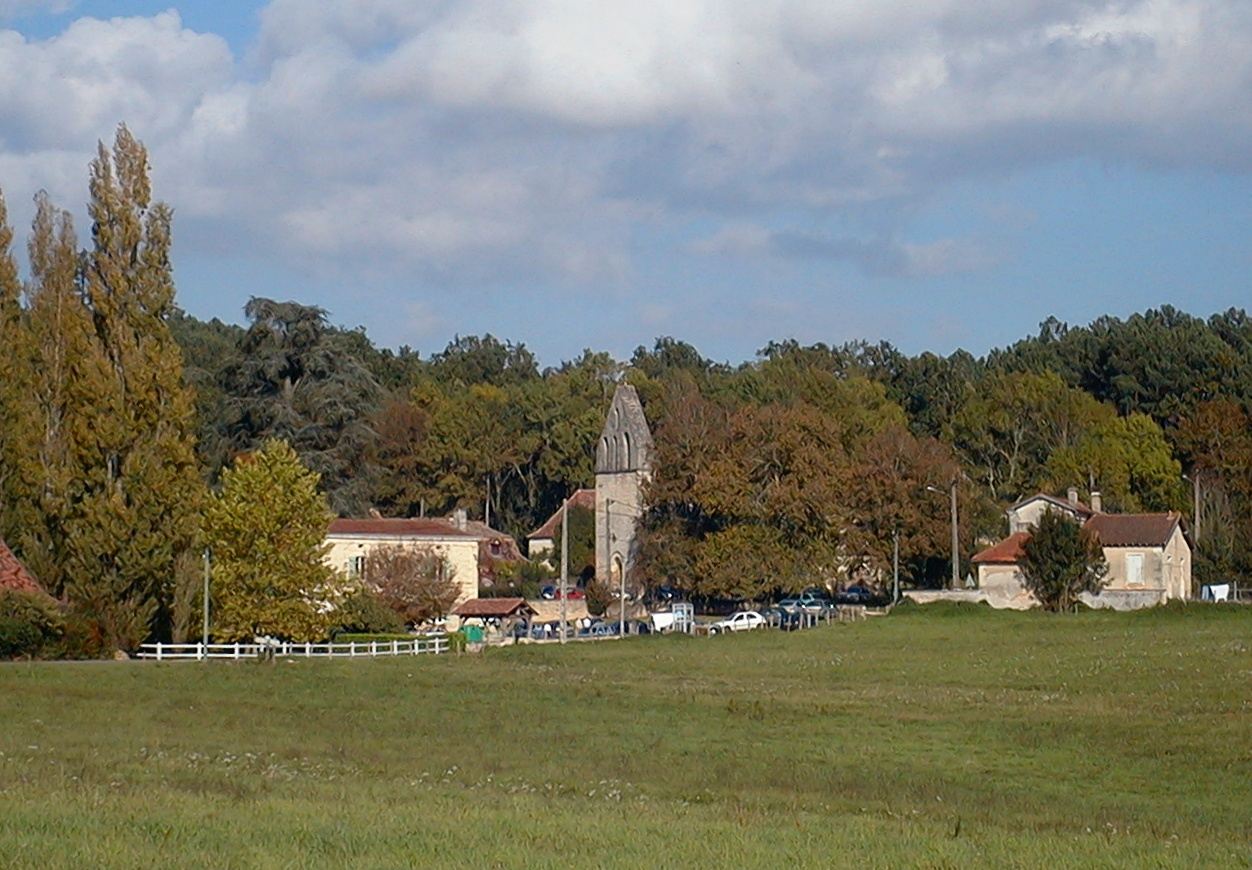
- A general view of Église-Neuve-d'Issac

- Coat of arms
- Location of Église-Neuve-d'Issac
- Location within France Location within Nouvelle-Aquitaine
- Coordinates: 44°58′58″N 0°25′39″E
- Country: France
- Region: Nouvelle-Aquitaine
- Department: Dordogne
- Arrondissement: Périgueux
- Canton: Périgord Central

Government
  - Mayor (2020–2026): Jean-Pierre Deffreix
- Area^{1}: 16.67 km^{2} (6.44 sq mi)
- Elevation: 126 m (413 ft)
- Highest elevation: 184 m (604 ft)
- Lowest elevation: 75 m (246 ft)
- Population (2023): 121
  - Density: 7.26/km^{2} (18.8/sq mi)
- Time zone: UTC+01:00 (CET)
  - Summer (DST): UTC+02:00 (CEST)
- INSEE/Postal code: 24161 /24400
- ^{1} French Land Register data, which excludes lakes, ponds, glaciers > 1 km^{2} (0.386 sq mi or 247 acres) and river estuaries.

Église-Neuve-d'Issac (French pronunciation: [eɡliz nœv disak]; Occitan: Gleisanueva d'Eiçac) is a commune in the Dordogne department in Nouvelle-Aquitaine in southwestern France.

The commune is located on the main road, D 709, between Bergerac and Mussidan.

== Population ==
Historical population
Year	Pop.	±% p.a.
1968	150	—
1975	135	−1.49%
1982	142	+0.72%
1990	115	−2.60%
1999	119	+0.38%
2007	130	+1.11%
2012	132	+0.31%
2017	140	+1.18%
2023	121	−2.40%
Source: INSEE

== See also ==
- Communes of the Dordogne department
