= Villamblard =

- Commune
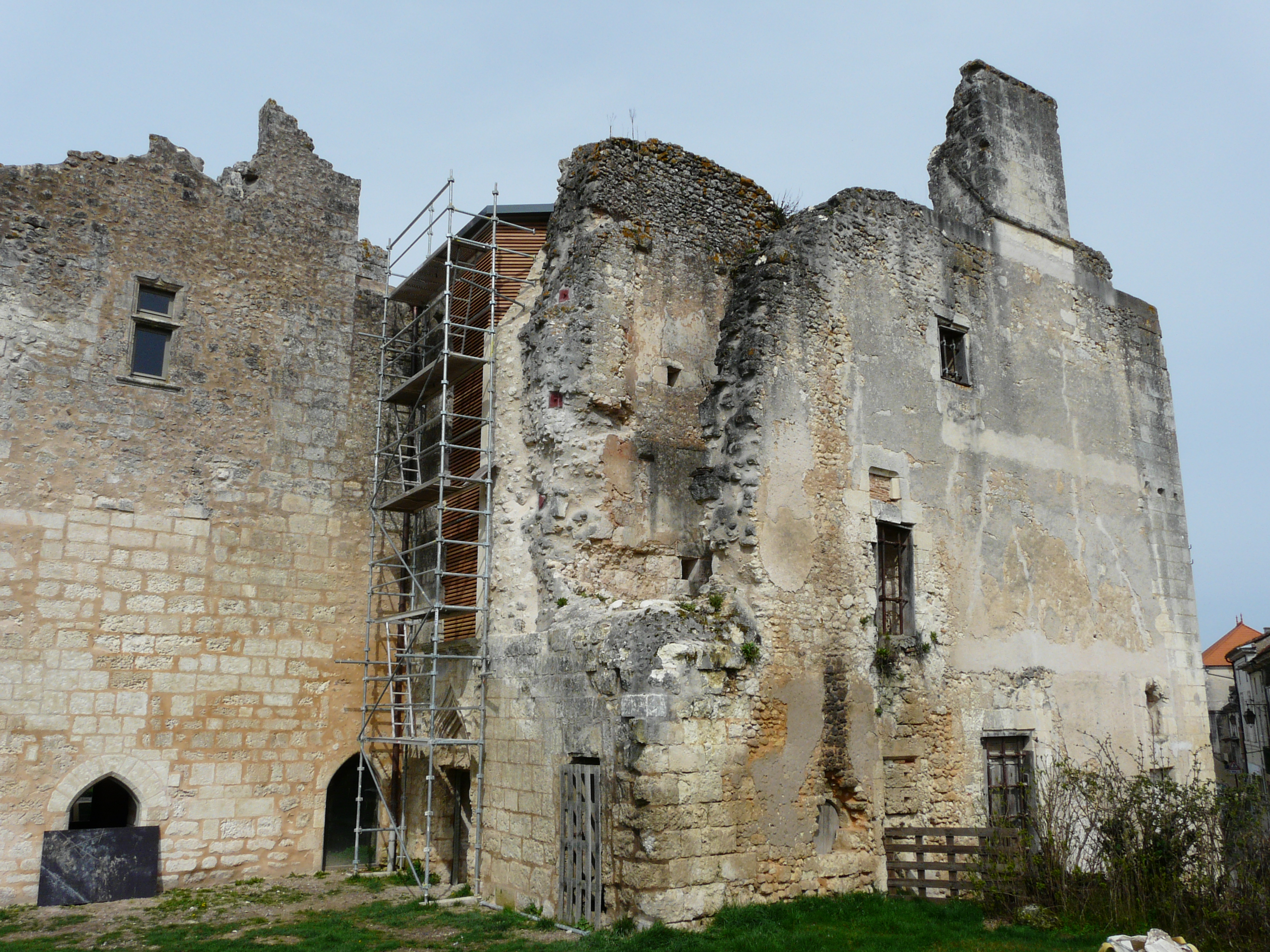
- Chateau Barrière

- Coat of arms
- Location of Villamblard
- Location within France Location within Nouvelle-Aquitaine
- Coordinates: 45°01′22″N 0°32′27″E
- Country: France
- Region: Nouvelle-Aquitaine
- Department: Dordogne
- Arrondissement: Périgueux
- Canton: Périgord Central
- Intercommunality: Isle et Crempse en Périgord

Government
  - Mayor (2020–2026): Jean-Luc Alary
- Area^{1}: 20.43 km^{2} (7.89 sq mi)
- Elevation: 60 m (200 ft)
- Highest elevation: 222 m (728 ft)
- Lowest elevation: 100 m (330 ft)
- Population (2023): 851
  - Density: 41.7/km^{2} (108/sq mi)
- Time zone: UTC+01:00 (CET)
  - Summer (DST): UTC+02:00 (CEST)
- INSEE/Postal code: 24581 /24140
- ^{1} French Land Register data, which excludes lakes, ponds, glaciers > 1 km^{2} (0.386 sq mi or 247 acres) and river estuaries.

Villamblard (French pronunciation: [vilɑ̃blaʁ]; Occitan: Vilamblard) is a commune in the Dordogne department in Nouvelle-Aquitaine in southwestern France.

== Population ==
Historical population
Year	Pop.	±% p.a.
1968	799	—
1975	841	+0.73%
1982	823	−0.31%
1990	813	−0.15%
1999	822	+0.12%
2007	892	+1.03%
2012	871	−0.48%
2017	886	+0.34%
2023	851	−0.67%
Source: INSEE

== See also ==
- Communes of the Dordogne department
