= Douville =

- Commune
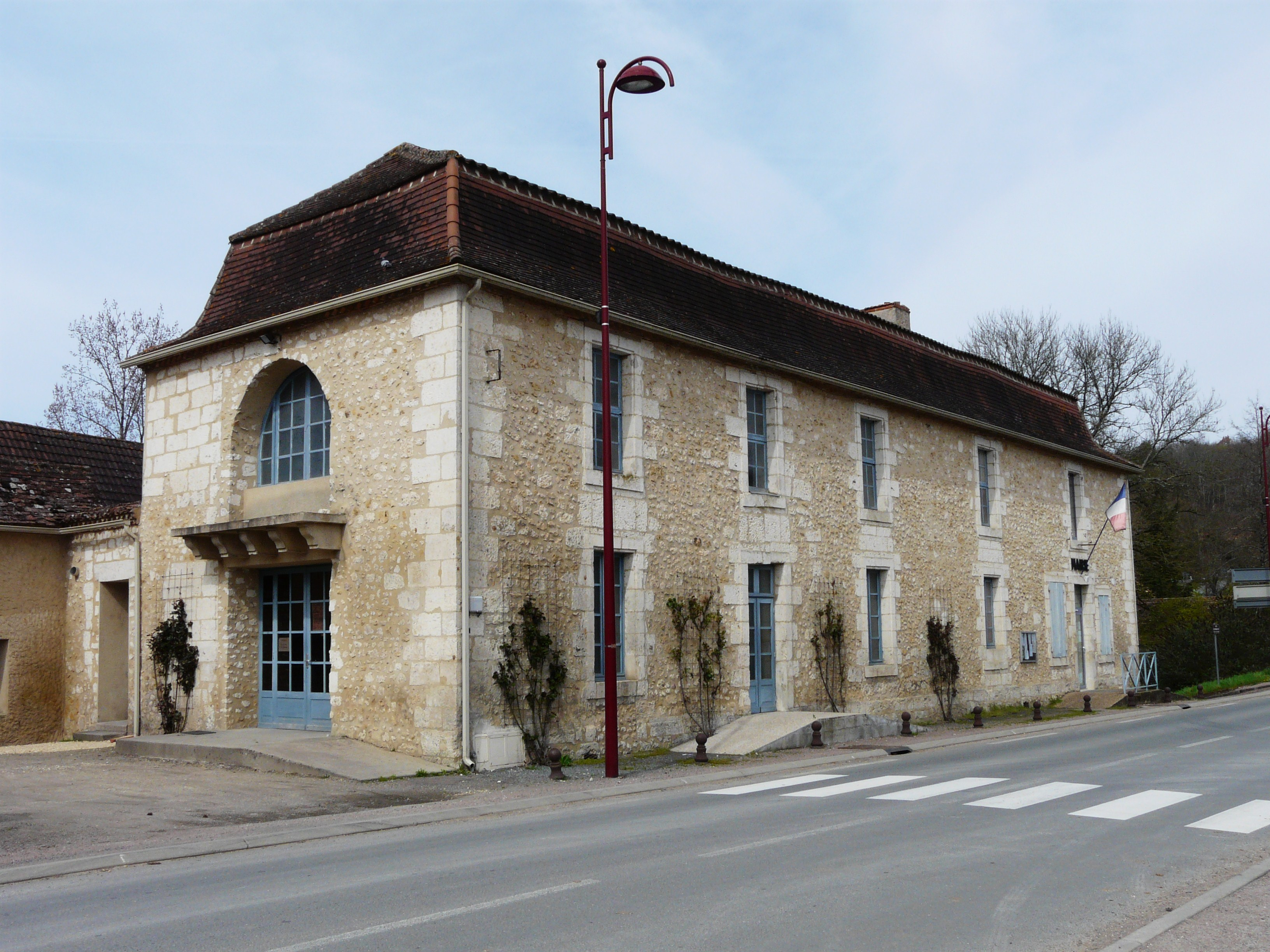
- The town hall in Douville

- Coat of arms
- Location of Douville
- Location within France Location within Nouvelle-Aquitaine
- Coordinates: 45°00′01″N 0°35′11″E
- Country: France
- Region: Nouvelle-Aquitaine
- Department: Dordogne
- Arrondissement: Périgueux
- Canton: Périgord Central

Government
  - Mayor (2020–2026): Arnaud Juncker
- Area^{1}: 19.91 km^{2} (7.69 sq mi)
- Elevation: 120 m (390 ft)
- Highest elevation: 233 m (764 ft)
- Lowest elevation: 110 m (360 ft)
- Population (2023): 453
  - Density: 22.8/km^{2} (58.9/sq mi)
- Time zone: UTC+01:00 (CET)
  - Summer (DST): UTC+02:00 (CEST)
- INSEE/Postal code: 24155 /24140
- ^{1} French Land Register data, which excludes lakes, ponds, glaciers > 1 km^{2} (0.386 sq mi or 247 acres) and river estuaries.

Douville (French pronunciation: [duvil]; Occitan: Dovila) is a commune in the Dordogne department in Nouvelle-Aquitaine in southwestern France.

== Population ==
Historical population
| Year | Pop. | ±% p.a. |
|---|---|---|
| 1968 | 351 | — |
| 1975 | 331 | −0.83% |
| 1982 | 352 | +0.88% |
| 1990 | 402 | +1.67% |
| 1999 | 401 | −0.03% |
| 2007 | 430 | +0.88% |
| 2012 | 457 | +1.23% |
| 2017 | 451 | −0.26% |
| 2023 | 453 | +0.07% |
Source: INSEE

== See also ==
- Communes of the Dordogne department
