= Creyssensac-et-Pissot =

- Commune
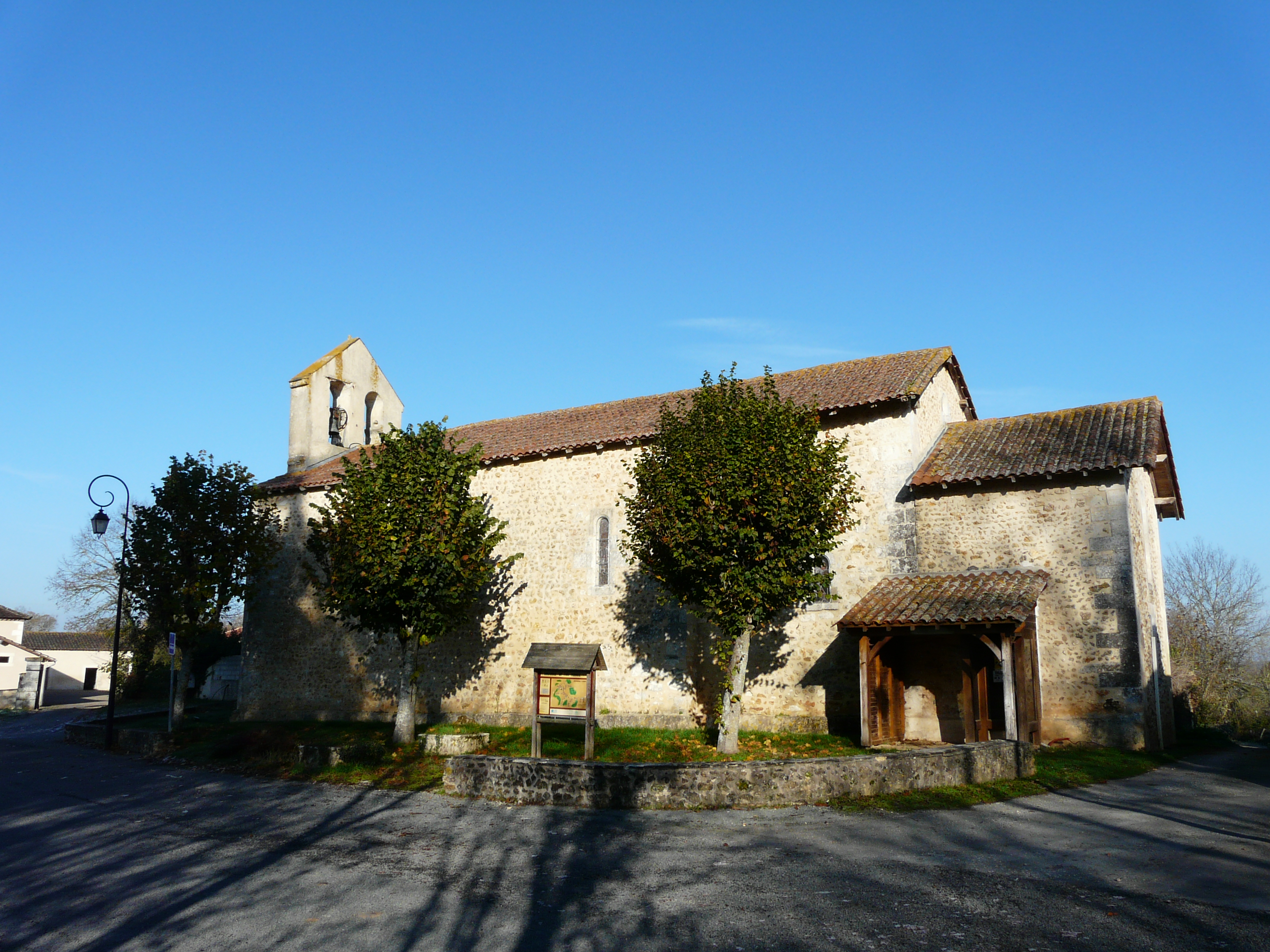
- The church in Creyssensac
- Location of Creyssensac-et-Pissot
- Location within France Location within Nouvelle-Aquitaine
- Coordinates: 45°05′00″N 0°39′47″E
- Country: France
- Region: Nouvelle-Aquitaine
- Department: Dordogne
- Arrondissement: Périgueux
- Canton: Périgord Central
- Intercommunality: Le Grand Périgueux

Government
  - Mayor (2020–2026): Claude Denis
- Area^{1}: 8.62 km^{2} (3.33 sq mi)
- Elevation: 208 m (682 ft)
- Highest elevation: 236 m (774 ft)
- Lowest elevation: 108 m (354 ft)
- Population (2023): 273
  - Density: 31.7/km^{2} (82.0/sq mi)
- Time zone: UTC+01:00 (CET)
  - Summer (DST): UTC+02:00 (CEST)
- INSEE/Postal code: 24146 /24380
- ^{1} French Land Register data, which excludes lakes, ponds, glaciers > 1 km^{2} (0.386 sq mi or 247 acres) and river estuaries.

Creyssensac-et-Pissot is a commune in the Dordogne department in Nouvelle-Aquitaine in southwestern France.

== Population ==
Historical population
Year	Pop.	±% p.a.
1968	138	—
1975	128	−1.07%
1982	126	−0.22%
1990	178	+4.41%
1999	201	+1.36%
2007	214	+0.79%
2012	251	+3.24%
2017	262	+0.86%
2023	273	+0.69%
Source: INSEE

== See also ==
- Communes of the Dordogne department
