= Paunat =

- Commune
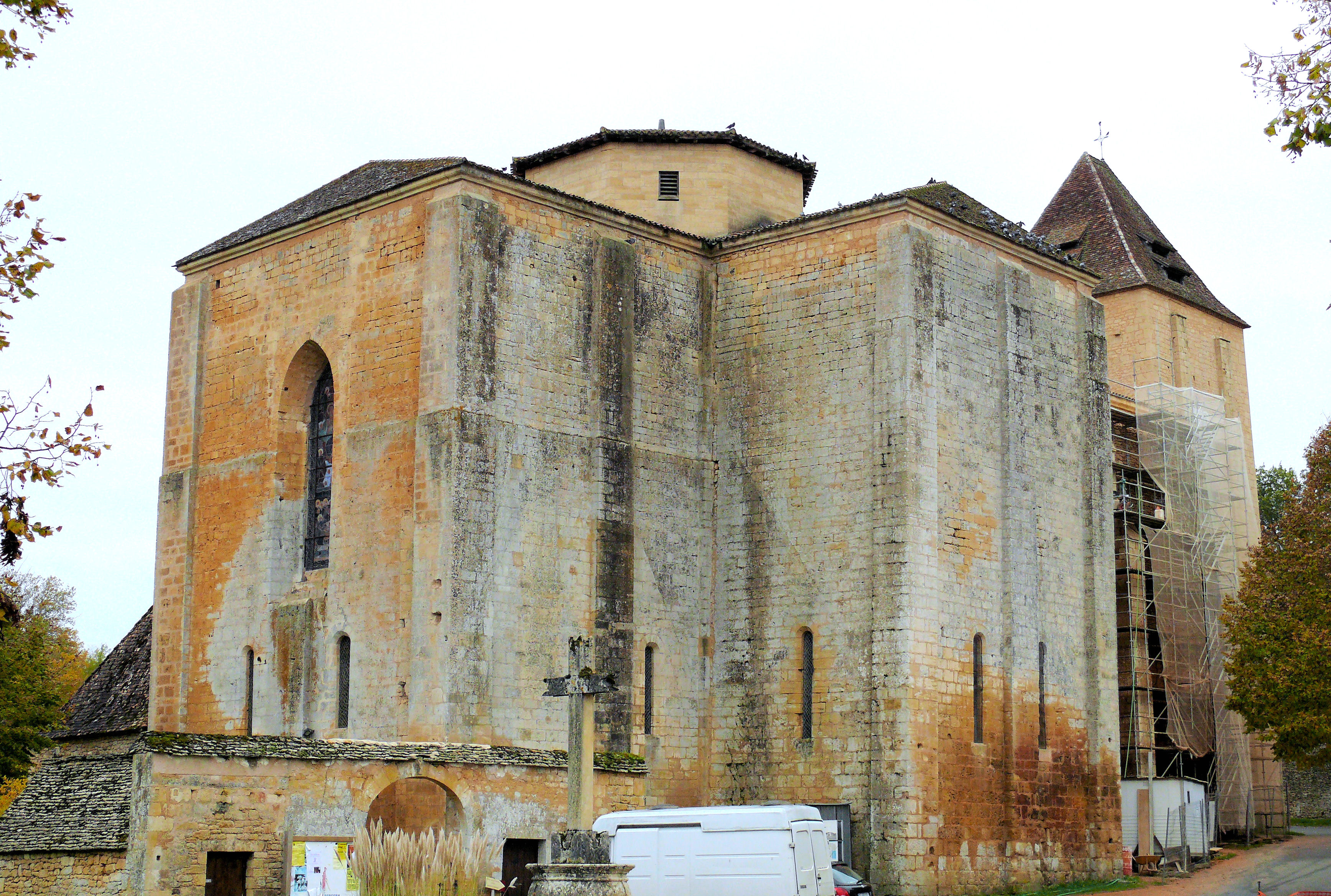
- The church in Paunat

- Coat of arms
- Location of Paunat
- Location within France Location within Nouvelle-Aquitaine
- Coordinates: 44°54′17″N 0°51′32″E
- Country: France
- Region: Nouvelle-Aquitaine
- Department: Dordogne
- Arrondissement: Périgueux
- Canton: Périgord Central
- Intercommunality: Le Grand Périgueux

Government
  - Mayor (2020–2026): Didier Marc
- Area^{1}: 18.28 km^{2} (7.06 sq mi)
- Highest elevation: 216 m (709 ft)
- Lowest elevation: 44 m (144 ft)
- Population (2023): 320
  - Density: 18/km^{2} (45/sq mi)
- Time zone: UTC+01:00 (CET)
  - Summer (DST): UTC+02:00 (CEST)
- INSEE/Postal code: 24318 /24510
- ^{1} French Land Register data, which excludes lakes, ponds, glaciers > 1 km^{2} (0.386 sq mi or 247 acres) and river estuaries.

Paunat (French pronunciation: [pona]; Occitan: Paunac) is a commune in the Dordogne department in Nouvelle-Aquitaine in southwestern France.

Saint-Martial church is the abbey church of one of the oldest abbeys in Périgord.It has been listed as a historic monument since 1956. Its construction dates back to the 6th century, when the village of Paunat was founded.

But like most religious buildings and castles, it has undergone numerous alterations, looting and destruction, so much so that the buildings visible today date back to the 12th century.

Built in the shape of a Latin cross, the church was designed as a refuge for the inhabitants and monks of Paunat, and features a rectangular choir.

The special feature of this church is its imposing bell tower-porch 25 metres high.

The church with its porch-tower was consecrated in 991. The current church features a rectangular chancel dating from the 12th century, which was vaulted with ribbed vaults in the 14th century. The present nave was built in the 15th century. As for the porch-tower, it has remained unchanged since its construction in the 12th century.

== The history of the abbey in a few dates ==
- 804: Gift to Saint Martial de Limoges of the monastery of Paunat,
- 860: Destruction by the Normans sailing up the Dordogne River.
- 991: Consecration of the church by Frotaire, Bishop of Périgueux
- 1100: The abbey church becomes a provostship
- 1304: Visit of Bertrand de Got, future Pope Clement V
- 1551/1656: Decline of monastic life
- 17th century: Succession of provosts
- 1790 – The church pews were burned down
- 1813: Filling of the floor with dry stone: 2.80m above the original ground level
- 1875: Brick reconstruction of the nave vaults and the roof
- 1896: Baptism of new bells
- 1956: The church was classified as a "Historical Monument"
- 1990 – Completion of a phase of work under the direction of the Historic Monuments services
- 1991: Millennium of the rebirth of the Abbey Church
- 2008: Restoration work on the bell tower
- 2010: Restoration work on the nave and stained glass windows
- 2012: Restoration work on the transept
- 2013/2014: Restoration of the choir

== Population ==
Historical population
Year	Pop.	±% p.a.
1968	282	—
1975	226	−3.11%
1982	217	−0.58%
1990	246	+1.58%
1999	271	+1.08%
2007	303	+1.40%
2012	311	+0.52%
2017	308	−0.19%
2023	320	+0.64%
Source: INSEE

== See also ==
- Communes of the Dordogne department
