= Grun-Bordas =

- Commune
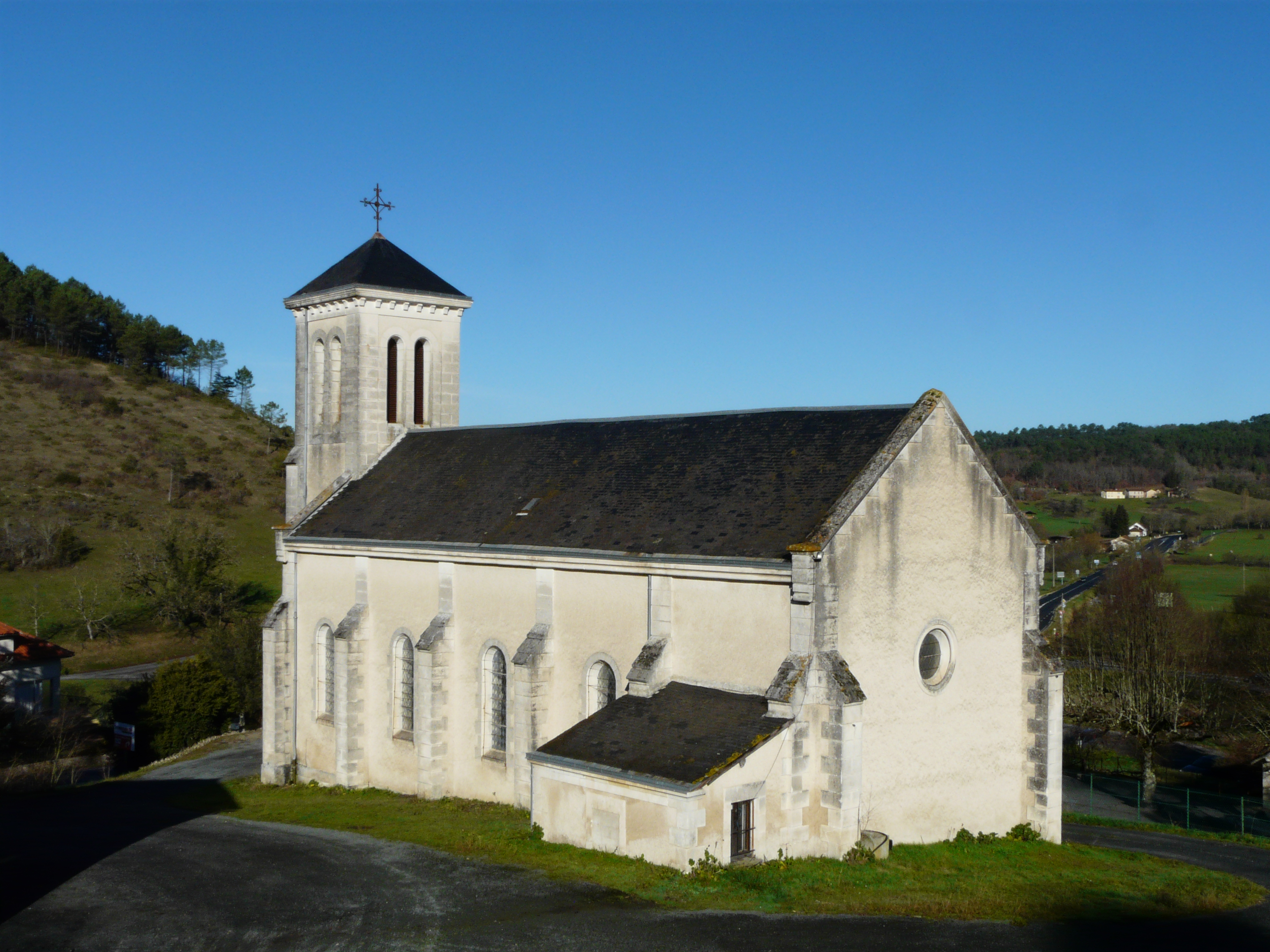
- The church in Grun-Bordas
- Location of Grun-Bordas
- Location within France Location within Nouvelle-Aquitaine
- Coordinates: 45°02′50″N 0°39′11″E
- Country: France
- Region: Nouvelle-Aquitaine
- Department: Dordogne
- Arrondissement: Périgueux
- Canton: Périgord Central
- Intercommunality: Le Grand Périgueux

Government
  - Mayor (2020–2026): Gilles Motard
- Area^{1}: 12.28 km^{2} (4.74 sq mi)
- Elevation: 128 m (420 ft)
- Highest elevation: 231 m (758 ft)
- Lowest elevation: 97 m (318 ft)
- Population (2023): 244
  - Density: 19.9/km^{2} (51.5/sq mi)
- Time zone: UTC+01:00 (CET)
  - Summer (DST): UTC+02:00 (CEST)
- INSEE/Postal code: 24208 /24380
- ^{1} French Land Register data, which excludes lakes, ponds, glaciers > 1 km^{2} (0.386 sq mi or 247 acres) and river estuaries.

Grun-Bordas (before 1993: Grun) is a commune in the Dordogne department in Nouvelle-Aquitaine in southwestern France.

== Population ==
Historical population
Year	Pop.	±% p.a.
1968	168	—
1975	145	−2.08%
1982	162	+1.60%
1990	165	+0.23%
1999	156	−0.62%
2007	209	+3.72%
2012	207	−0.19%
2017	227	+1.86%
2023	244	+1.21%
Source: INSEE

== See also ==
- Communes of the Dordogne department
