= Arrondissement of Périgueux =

Coordinates: 45.18°N 0.72°E

Périgueux
- Arrondissement
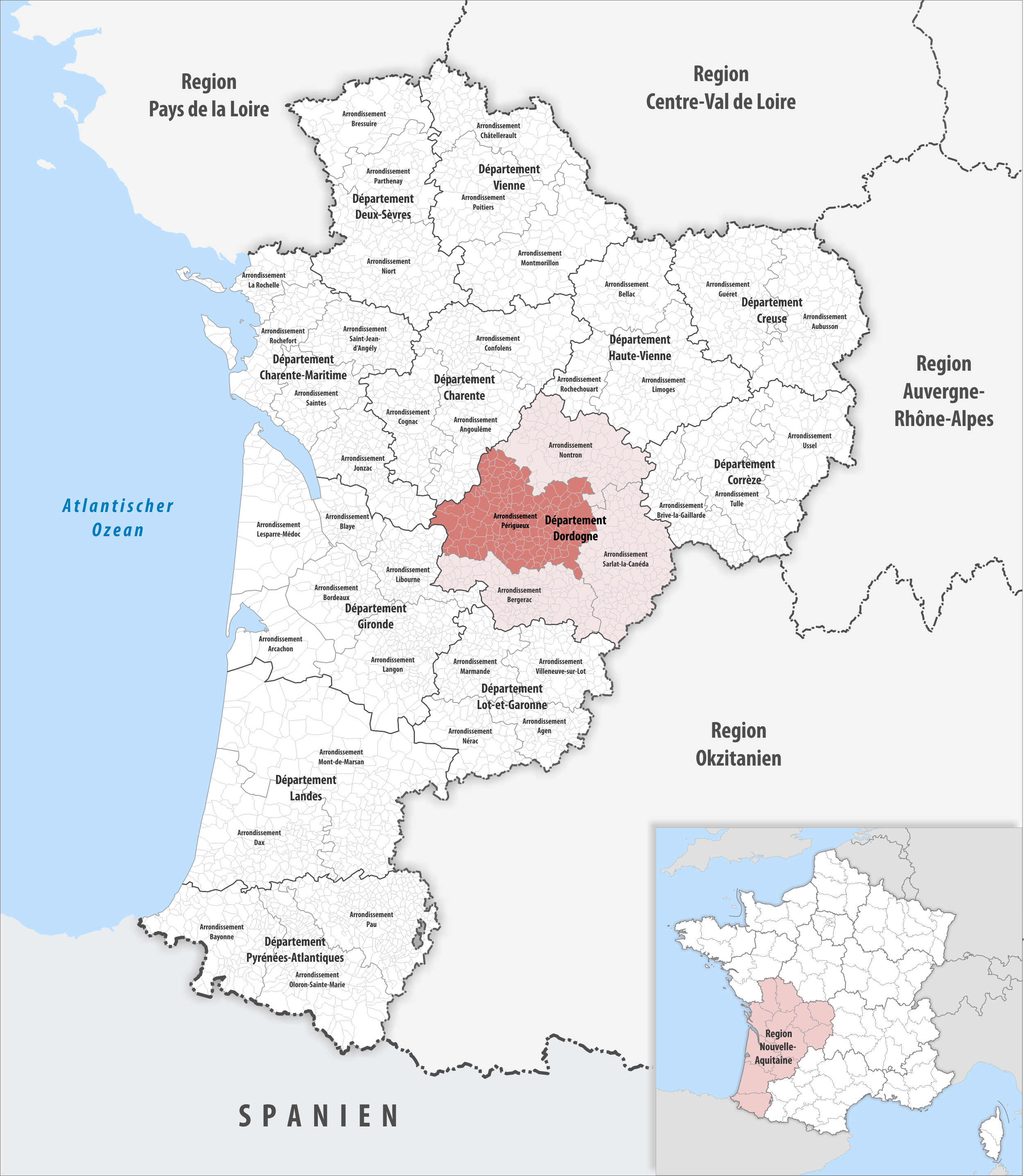
- Location within the region Nouvelle-Aquitaine
- Country: France
- Region: Nouvelle-Aquitaine
- Department: Dordogne
- No. of communes: {{{nbcomm}}}
- Area: 2,869.3 km^{2} (1,107.8 sq mi)
- Population (2023): 177,114
  - Density: 61.727/km^{2} (159.87/sq mi)
- INSEE code: 243

The arrondissement of Périgueux is an arrondissement of France in the Dordogne department in the Nouvelle-Aquitaine region. It has 143 communes. Its population is 175,870 (2021), and its area is 2,869.3 km^{2} (1,107.8 sq mi).

== Composition ==
The communes of the arrondissement of Périgueux, and their INSEE codes, are:

1. Agonac (24002)
2. Allemans (24007)
3. Annesse-et-Beaulieu (24010)
4. Antonne-et-Trigonant (24011)
5. Bassillac et Auberoche (24026)
6. Beaupouyet (24029)
7. Beauregard-et-Bassac (24031)
8. Beauronne (24032)
9. Beleymas (24034)
10. Bertric-Burée (24038)
11. Boulazac Isle Manoire (24053)
12. Bourg-des-Maisons (24057)
13. Bourg-du-Bost (24058)
14. Bourgnac (24059)
15. Bourrou (24061)
16. Bouteilles-Saint-Sébastien (24062)
17. Campsegret (24077)
18. Celles (24090)
19. Chalagnac (24094)
20. Champagne-et-Fontaine (24097)
21. Champcevinel (24098)
22. Chancelade (24102)
23. Chantérac (24104)
24. Chapdeuil (24105)
25. La Chapelle-Gonaguet (24108)
26. La Chapelle-Grésignac (24109)
27. La Chapelle-Montabourlet (24110)
28. Chassaignes (24114)
29. Château-l'Évêque (24115)
30. Cherval (24119)
31. Clermont-de-Beauregard (24123)
32. Comberanche-et-Épeluche (24128)
33. Cornille (24135)
34. Coulounieix-Chamiers (24138)
35. Coursac (24139)
36. Coutures (24141)
37. Creyssac (24144)
38. Creyssensac-et-Pissot (24146)
39. Douchapt (24154)
40. La Douze (24156)
41. Douville (24155)
42. Douzillac (24157)
43. Échourgnac (24159)
44. Église-Neuve-de-Vergt (24160)
45. Église-Neuve-d'Issac (24161)
46. Escoire (24162)
47. Eygurande-et-Gardedeuil (24165)
48. Eyraud-Crempse-Maurens (24259)
49. Fouleix (24190)
50. Gout-Rossignol (24199)
51. Grand-Brassac (24200)
52. Grignols (24205)
53. Grun-Bordas (24208)
54. Issac (24211)
55. Jaure (24213)
56. La Jemaye-Ponteyraud (24216)
57. Lacropte (24220)
58. Les Lèches (24234)
59. Léguillac-de-l'Auche (24236)
60. Lisle (24243)
61. Lusignac (24247)
62. Manzac-sur-Vern (24251)
63. Marsac-sur-l'Isle (24256)
64. Ménesplet (24264)
65. Mensignac (24266)
66. Montagnac-la-Crempse (24285)
67. Montagrier (24286)
68. Montpon-Ménestérol (24294)
69. Montrem (24295)
70. Moulin-Neuf (24297)
71. Mussidan (24299)
72. Nanteuil-Auriac-de-Bourzac (24303)
73. Neuvic (24309)
74. Parcoul-Chenaud (24316)
75. Paunat (24318)
76. Paussac-et-Saint-Vivien (24319)
77. Périgueux (24322)
78. Petit-Bersac (24323)
79. Le Pizou (24329)
80. Razac-sur-l'Isle (24350)
81. Ribérac (24352)
82. La Roche-Chalais (24354)
83. Saint-Amand-de-Vergt (24365)
84. Saint-André-de-Double (24367)
85. Saint-Aquilin (24371)
86. Saint-Astier (24372)
87. Saint-Aulaye-Puymangou (24376)
88. Saint-Barthélemy-de-Bellegarde (24380)
89. Saint-Crépin-d'Auberoche (24390)
90. Saint-Étienne-de-Puycorbier (24399)
91. Saint-Front-de-Pradoux (24409)
92. Saint-Georges-de-Montclard (24414)
93. Saint-Germain-du-Salembre (24418)
94. Saint-Geyrac (24421)
95. Saint-Hilaire-d'Estissac (24422)
96. Saint-Jean-d'Ataux (24424)
97. Saint-Jean-d'Estissac (24426)
98. Saint-Just (24434)
99. Saint-Laurent-des-Hommes (24436)
100. Saint-Léon-sur-l'Isle (24442)
101. Saint-Louis-en-l'Isle (24444)
102. Saint-Martial-Viveyrol (24452)
103. Saint-Martial-d'Artenset (24449)
104. Saint-Martin-de-Ribérac (24455)
105. Saint-Martin-des-Combes (24456)
106. Saint-Martin-l'Astier (24457)
107. Saint-Mayme-de-Péreyrol (24459)
108. Saint-Méard-de-Drône (24460)
109. Saint-Médard-de-Mussidan (24462)
110. Saint-Michel-de-Double (24465)
111. Saint-Michel-de-Villadeix (24468)
112. Saint-Pardoux-de-Drône (24477)
113. Saint-Paul-Lizonne (24482)
114. Saint-Paul-de-Serre (24480)
115. Saint-Pierre-de-Chignac (24484)
116. Saint Privat en Périgord (24490)
117. Saint-Sauveur-Lalande (24500)
118. Saint-Sulpice-de-Roumagnac (24504)
119. Saint-Séverin-d'Estissac (24502)
120. Saint-Victor (24508)
121. Saint-Vincent-Jalmoutiers (24511)
122. Saint-Vincent-de-Connezac (24509)
123. Salon (24518)
124. Sanilhac (24312)
125. Sarliac-sur-l'Isle (24521)
126. Savignac-les-Églises (24527)
127. Segonzac (24529)
128. Servanches (24533)
129. Siorac-de-Ribérac (24537)
130. Sorges et Ligueux en Périgord (24540)
131. Sourzac (24543)
132. Tocane-Saint-Apre (24553)
133. La Tour-Blanche-Cercles (24554)
134. Trélissac (24557)
135. Val de Louyre et Caudeau (24362)
136. Vallereuil (24562)
137. Vanxains (24564)
138. Vendoire (24569)
139. Vergt (24571)
140. Verteillac (24573)
141. Veyrines-de-Vergt (24576)
142. Villamblard (24581)
143. Villetoureix (24586)

== History ==
The arrondissement of Périgueux was created in 1800. By 1841 the population was 105,753; there were 116 communes and 9 cantons in that year.

At the January 2017 reorganisation of the arrondissements of Dordogne, it gained 21 communes from the arrondissement of Bergerac, and it lost 28 communes to the arrondissement of Nontron and 22 communes to the arrondissement of Sarlat-la-Canéda.

As a result of the reorganisation of the cantons of France which came into effect in 2015, the borders of the cantons are no longer related to the borders of the arrondissements. The cantons of the arrondissement of Périgueux were, as of January 2015:

1. Brantôme
2. Excideuil
3. Hautefort
4. Montagrier
5. Montpon-Ménestérol
6. Mussidan
7. Neuvic
8. Périgueux-Centre
9. Périgueux-Nord-Est
10. Périgueux-Ouest
11. Ribérac
12. Saint-Astier
13. Saint-Aulaye
14. Saint-Pierre-de-Chignac
15. Savignac-les-Églises
16. Thenon
17. Vergt
18. Verteillac
