= Chalagnac =

- Commune
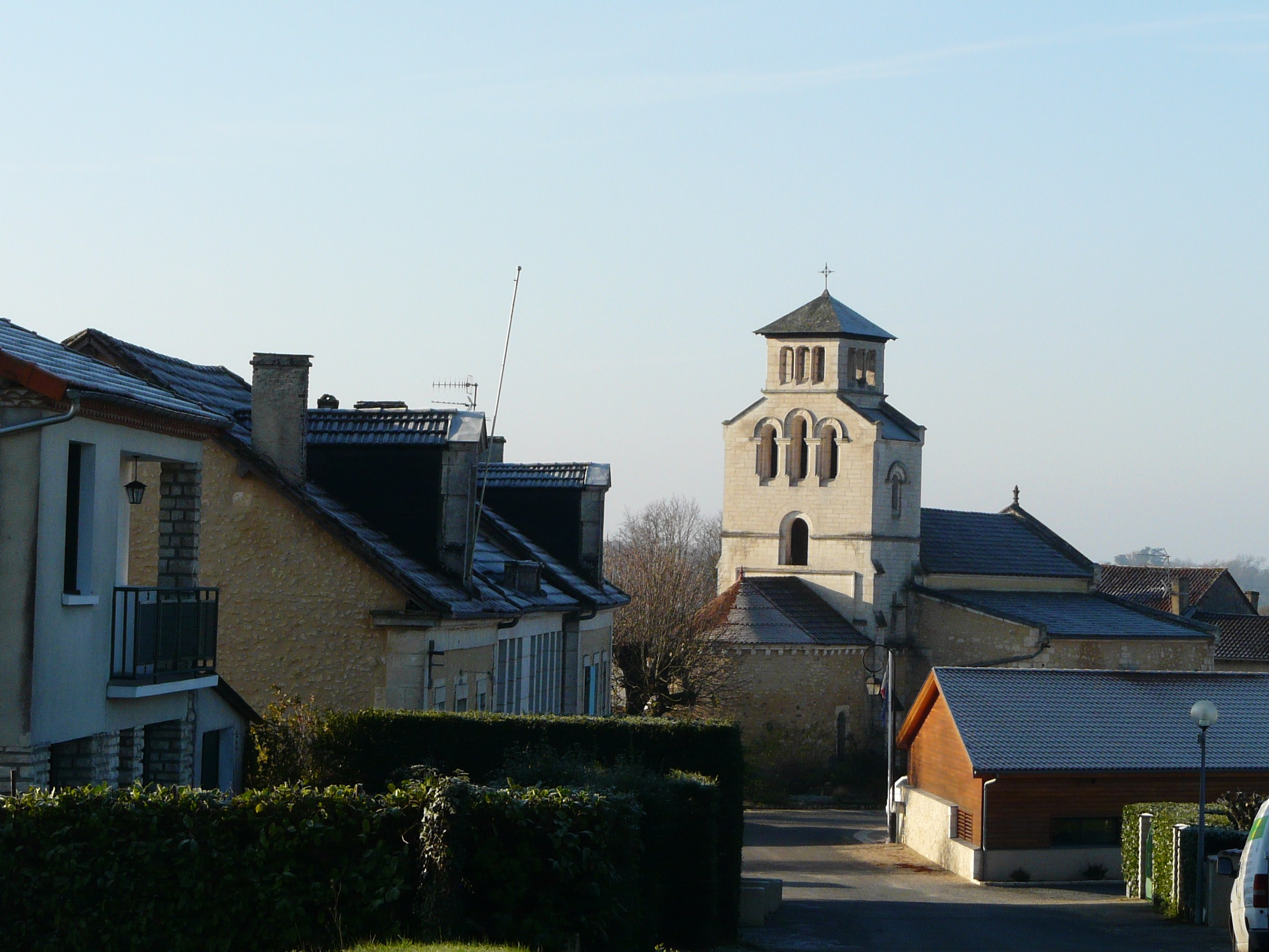
- The church and surroundings in Chalagnac
- Location of Chalagnac
- Location within France Location within Nouvelle-Aquitaine
- Coordinates: 45°05′36″N 0°40′41″E
- Country: France
- Region: Nouvelle-Aquitaine
- Department: Dordogne
- Arrondissement: Périgueux
- Canton: Périgord Central
- Intercommunality: Le Grand Périgueux

Government
  - Mayor (2021–2026): Dominique Chansard
- Area^{1}: 14.15 km^{2} (5.46 sq mi)
- Elevation: 218 m (715 ft)
- Highest elevation: 238 m (781 ft)
- Lowest elevation: 124 m (407 ft)
- Population (2023): 442
  - Density: 31.2/km^{2} (80.9/sq mi)
- Time zone: UTC+01:00 (CET)
  - Summer (DST): UTC+02:00 (CEST)
- INSEE/Postal code: 24094 /24380
- ^{1} French Land Register data, which excludes lakes, ponds, glaciers > 1 km^{2} (0.386 sq mi or 247 acres) and river estuaries.

Chalagnac (French pronunciation: [ʃalaɲak]; Occitan: Chalanhac) is a commune in the Dordogne department in Nouvelle-Aquitaine in southwestern France.

== Population ==
Historical population
Year	Pop.	±% p.a.
1968	237	—
1975	222	−0.93%
1982	281	+3.42%
1990	338	+2.34%
1999	338	+0.00%
2007	383	+1.57%
2012	404	+1.07%
2017	435	+1.49%
2023	442	+0.27%
Source: INSEE

== See also ==
- Communes of the Dordogne department
