= Église-Neuve-de-Vergt =

- Commune
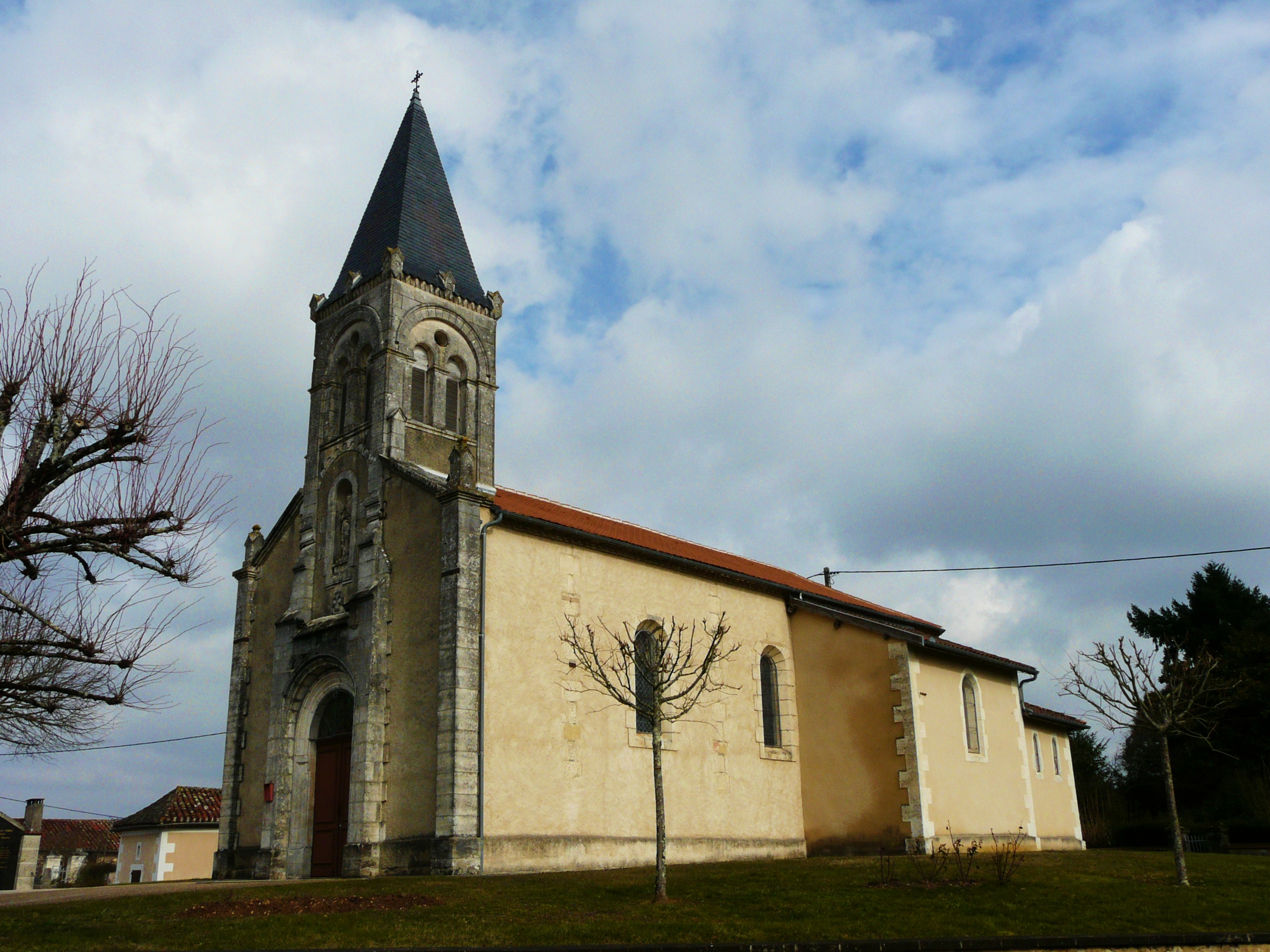
- St. Bartholomew's Church
- Location of Église-Neuve-de-Vergt
- Location within France Location within Nouvelle-Aquitaine
- Coordinates: 45°05′01″N 0°44′00″E
- Country: France
- Region: Nouvelle-Aquitaine
- Department: Dordogne
- Arrondissement: Périgueux
- Canton: Périgord Central
- Intercommunality: Le Grand Périgueux

Government
  - Mayor (2020–2026): Thierry Nardou
- Area^{1}: 7.43 km^{2} (2.87 sq mi)
- Elevation: 230 m (750 ft)
- Highest elevation: 247 m (810 ft)
- Lowest elevation: 148 m (486 ft)
- Population (2023): 579
  - Density: 77.9/km^{2} (202/sq mi)
- Time zone: UTC+01:00 (CET)
  - Summer (DST): UTC+02:00 (CEST)
- INSEE/Postal code: 24160 /24380
- ^{1} French Land Register data, which excludes lakes, ponds, glaciers > 1 km^{2} (0.386 sq mi or 247 acres) and river estuaries.

Église-Neuve-de-Vergt (French pronunciation: [eɡliz nœv də vɛʁ]; Occitan: Gleisanueva de Vern) is a commune in the Dordogne department in Nouvelle-Aquitaine in southwestern France.

== Population ==
Historical population
Year	Pop.	±% p.a.
1968	250	—
1975	272	+1.21%
1982	272	+0.00%
1990	307	+1.52%
1999	326	+0.67%
2007	365	+1.42%
2012	474	+5.37%
2017	552	+3.09%
2023	579	+0.80%
Source: INSEE

== See also ==
- Communes of the Dordogne department
