= Campsegret =

- Commune
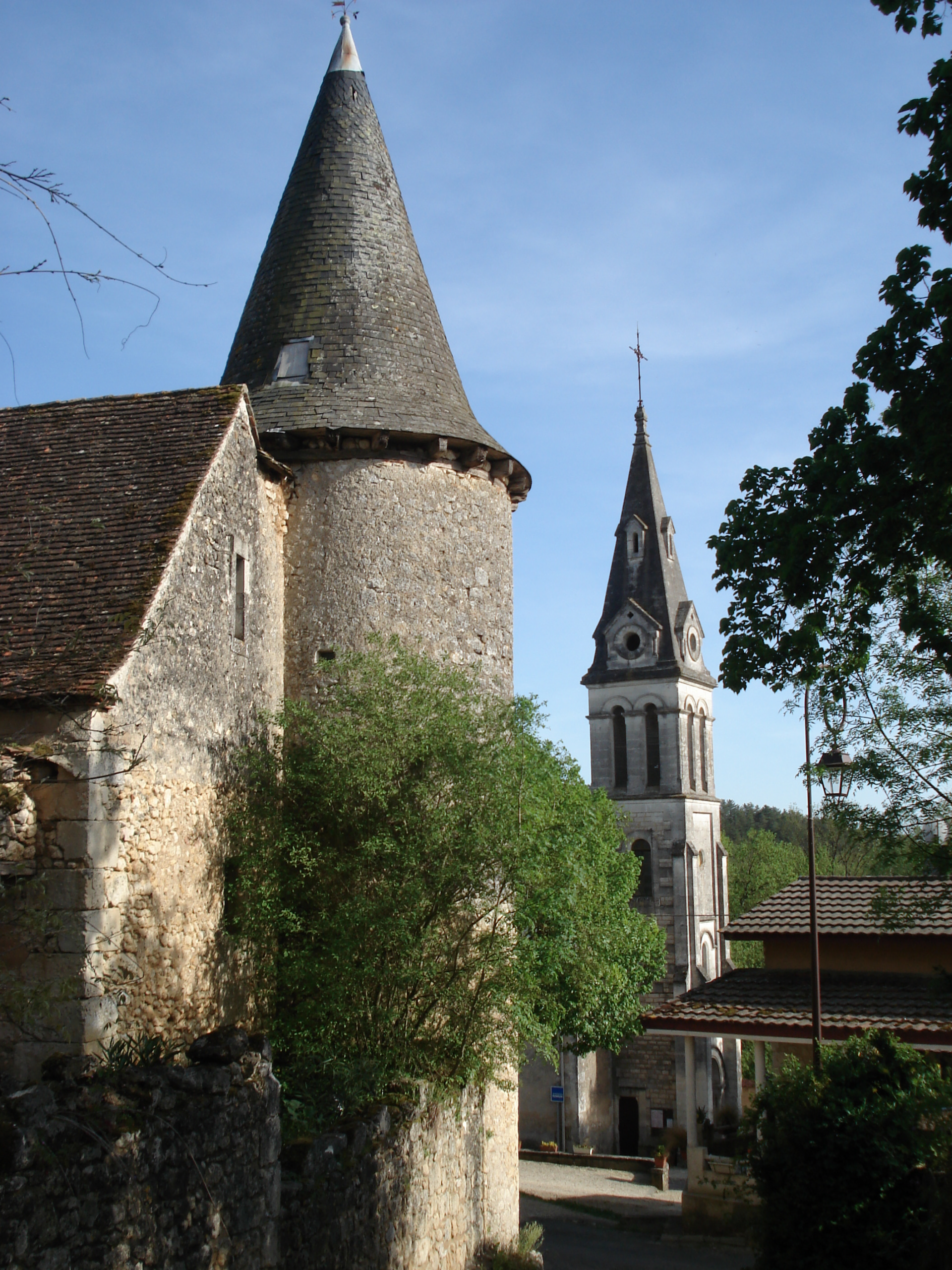
- The church and surroundings in Campsegret

- Coat of arms
- Location of Campsegret
- Location within France Location within Nouvelle-Aquitaine
- Coordinates: 44°56′07″N 0°33′37″E
- Country: France
- Region: Nouvelle-Aquitaine
- Department: Dordogne
- Arrondissement: Périgueux
- Canton: Périgord Central

Government
  - Mayor (2020–2026): Jean-Marie Gellé
- Area^{1}: 13.83 km^{2} (5.34 sq mi)
- Highest elevation: 201 m (659 ft)
- Lowest elevation: 68 m (223 ft)
- Population (2023): 407
  - Density: 29.4/km^{2} (76.2/sq mi)
- Time zone: UTC+01:00 (CET)
  - Summer (DST): UTC+02:00 (CEST)
- INSEE/Postal code: 24077 /24140
- ^{1} French Land Register data, which excludes lakes, ponds, glaciers > 1 km^{2} (0.386 sq mi or 247 acres) and river estuaries.

Campsegret is a commune in the Dordogne department in Nouvelle-Aquitaine in southwestern France.

== Population ==
Historical population
Year	Pop.	±% p.a.
1968	342	—
1975	351	+0.37%
1982	379	+1.10%
1990	403	+0.77%
1999	351	−1.52%
2007	396	+1.52%
2012	390	−0.30%
2017	389	−0.05%
2023	407	+0.76%
Source: INSEE

== See also ==
- Communes of the Dordogne department
