= Beleymas =

- Commune
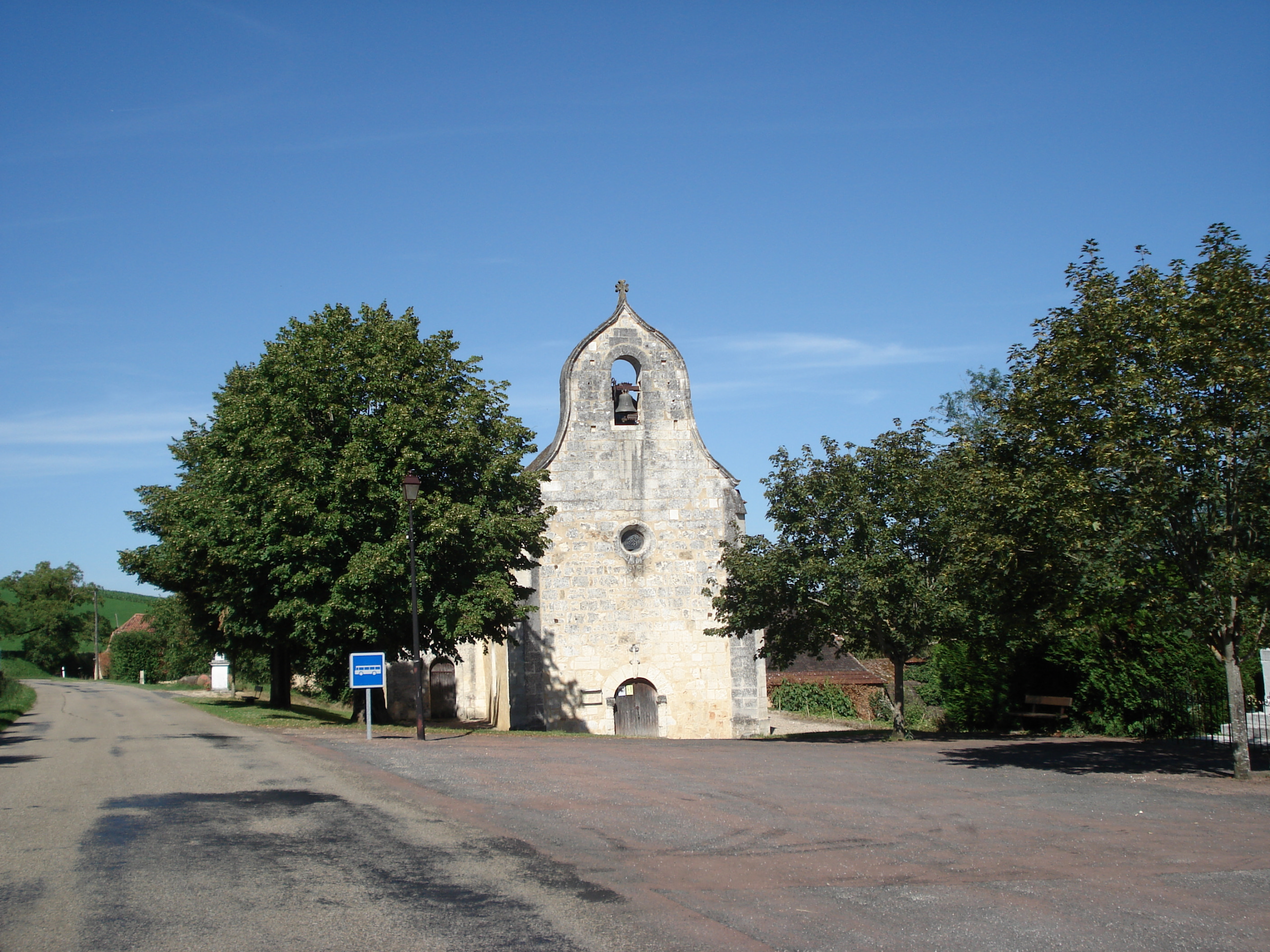
- The church of Beleymas
- Location of Beleymas
- Location within France Location within Nouvelle-Aquitaine
- Coordinates: 44°59′41″N 0°30′23″E
- Country: France
- Region: Nouvelle-Aquitaine
- Department: Dordogne
- Arrondissement: Périgueux
- Canton: Périgord Central

Government
  - Mayor (2020–2026): Joseph Ruiz
- Area^{1}: 16.07 km^{2} (6.20 sq mi)
- Elevation: 100 m (330 ft)
- Highest elevation: 194 m (636 ft)
- Lowest elevation: 79 m (259 ft)
- Population (2023): 288
  - Density: 17.9/km^{2} (46.4/sq mi)
- Time zone: UTC+01:00 (CET)
  - Summer (DST): UTC+02:00 (CEST)
- INSEE/Postal code: 24034 /24140
- ^{1} French Land Register data, which excludes lakes, ponds, glaciers > 1 km^{2} (0.386 sq mi or 247 acres) and river estuaries.

Beleymas is a commune in the Dordogne department in southwestern France.

== Population ==
Historical population
Year	Pop.	±% p.a.
1968	207	—
1975	193	−1.00%
1982	215	+1.55%
1990	206	−0.53%
1999	224	+0.94%
2007	243	+1.02%
2012	266	+1.83%
2017	274	+0.59%
2023	288	+0.83%
Source: INSEE

== See also ==
- Communes of the Dordogne department
