= Veyrines-de-Vergt =

- Commune
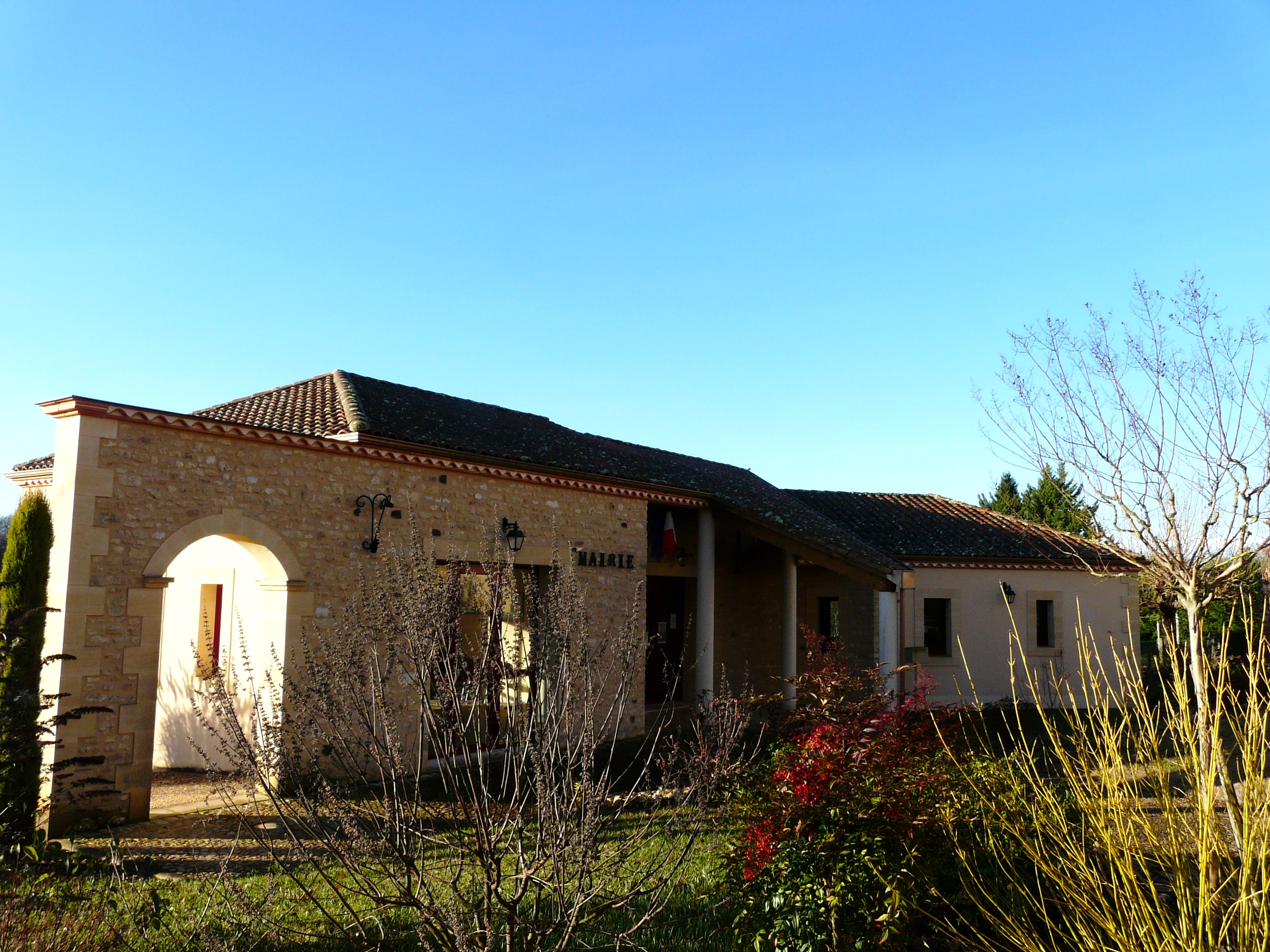
- The town hall in Veyrines-de-Vergt
- Location of Veyrines-de-Vergt
- Location within France Location within Nouvelle-Aquitaine
- Coordinates: 45°00′13″N 0°46′20″E
- Country: France
- Region: Nouvelle-Aquitaine
- Department: Dordogne
- Arrondissement: Périgueux
- Canton: Périgord Central
- Intercommunality: Le Grand Périgueux

Government
  - Mayor (2020–2026): Jean Luc Noyer
- Area^{1}: 11.91 km^{2} (4.60 sq mi)
- Elevation: 190 m (620 ft)
- Highest elevation: 254 m (833 ft)
- Lowest elevation: 139 m (456 ft)
- Population (2023): 244
  - Density: 20.5/km^{2} (53.1/sq mi)
- Time zone: UTC+01:00 (CET)
  - Summer (DST): UTC+02:00 (CEST)
- INSEE/Postal code: 24576 /24380
- ^{1} French Land Register data, which excludes lakes, ponds, glaciers > 1 km^{2} (0.386 sq mi or 247 acres) and river estuaries.

Veyrines-de-Vergt (French pronunciation: [veʁin də vɛʁ]; Occitan: Veirinas de Vern) is a commune in the Dordogne department in Nouvelle-Aquitaine in southwestern France.

== Population ==
Historical population
Year	Pop.	±% p.a.
1968	213	—
1975	175	−2.77%
1982	185	+0.80%
1990	192	+0.47%
1999	176	−0.96%
2007	219	+2.77%
2012	252	+2.85%
2017	256	+0.32%
2023	244	−0.80%
Source: INSEE

== See also ==
- Communes of the Dordogne department
