= Saint-Jean-d'Estissac =

- Commune
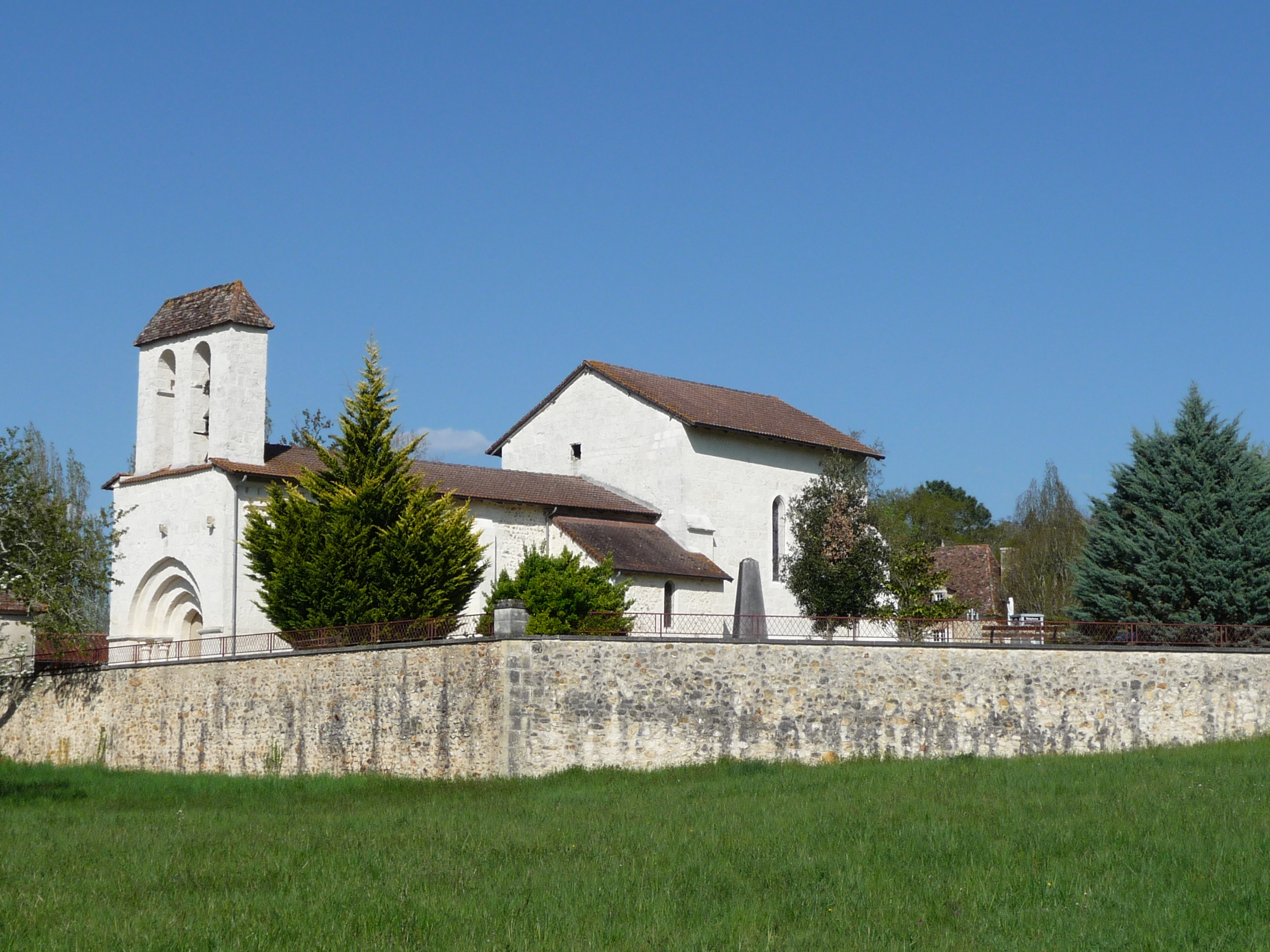
- The church in Saint-Jean-d'Estissac
- Location of Saint-Jean-d'Estissac
- Location within France Location within Nouvelle-Aquitaine
- Coordinates: 45°01′49″N 0°30′47″E
- Country: France
- Region: Nouvelle-Aquitaine
- Department: Dordogne
- Arrondissement: Périgueux
- Canton: Périgord Central
- Intercommunality: Isle et Crempse en Périgord

Government
  - Mayor (2020–2026): Marie-Rose Veyssière
- Area^{1}: 12.86 km^{2} (4.97 sq mi)
- Elevation: 131 m (430 ft)
- Highest elevation: 207 m (679 ft)
- Lowest elevation: 88 m (289 ft)
- Population (2023): 158
  - Density: 12.3/km^{2} (31.8/sq mi)
- Time zone: UTC+01:00 (CET)
  - Summer (DST): UTC+02:00 (CEST)
- INSEE/Postal code: 24426 /24140
- ^{1} French Land Register data, which excludes lakes, ponds, glaciers > 1 km^{2} (0.386 sq mi or 247 acres) and river estuaries.

Saint-Jean-d'Estissac (French pronunciation: [sɛ̃ ʒɑ̃ dɛstisak]; Limousin: Sent Joan d'Estiçac) is a commune in the Dordogne department in Nouvelle-Aquitaine in southwestern France.

== Population ==
Historical population
Year	Pop.	±% p.a.
1968	145	—
1975	132	−1.33%
1982	147	+1.55%
1990	111	−3.45%
1999	125	+1.33%
2007	142	+1.61%
2012	159	+2.29%
2017	177	+2.17%
2023	158	−1.87%
Source: INSEE

== Local Committees ==
=== Environment/Clean up ===
President : Gérard Mathias

- Patrice Marty
- Thomas Messager
- Anne-Marie Molieres
- Philippe Chambost

=== Finances ===
President : Marie-Rose Veyssiere

- Patrice Lagarde
- Pierre Bannes

=== Roads ===
President : Patrice Lagarde

- Gérard Mathias
- Thomas Messager
- Patrice Marty

=== Community buildings ===
President : Pierre Bannes

- Christine Bernazeau
- Jocelyne Manteau
- Gérard Naboulet
- Gérard Mathias
- Philippe Chambost

=== Information communication ===
President : Christine Bernazeau

- Patrice Marty
- Anne-Marie Molieres
- Thomas Messager

=== Cemetery management ===
President : Gérard Naboulet

- Pierre Bannes
- Gérard Mathtas
- Patrice Lagarde

== Community Services ==
Schools in RPI with Issac and Villamblard

=== Library ===
In the Town Hall – opening hours the same as the secretariat

=== Beleymas – Lagudal waste collection centre ===
Monday and Wednesday all day Saturday morning:

- April 1 to October 30 from 9 a.m. to noon and from 2 to 6 p.m.
- November 1 to March 31 from 9 a.m. to noon and from 1 to 5 p.m.

=== Community Facilities ===
Community room for 70 to 80 persons

== Statistics ==
Detailed Statistics of the city of Saint Jean d'Estissac are results from the 2005 collection

=== Population Data ===
- Of the 146 residents 49.3% men and 50,.% women.
- The number of singles was: 25.8% of the population.
- Married couples 57.8% of the population. Divorced were 10.2%
- The number of widows and widowers was 6,3% in Saint Jean d'Estissac

=== Economic Data ===
- The rate of activity was 67% in 2005 and 59.5 in 1999
- The unemployment rate in 2005 was 20.3% and in 1999 it was 23.4%
- Retired and pre-retired accounted for 37% of the population in 2005 and 28% in 1999

== Contact ==
Address: Le Bourg 24140 Saint Jean d'Estissac Phone: 05 53 81 96 86 Fax: 05 53 81 25 31 Email: mairie.saintjeandestissac@wanadoo.fr

== See also ==
- Communes of the Dordogne department
