= Canton of Périgord Central =

Coordinates: 45.03°N 0.72°E

The canton of Périgord Central is an administrative division of the Dordogne department, southwestern France. It was created at the French canton reorganisation which came into effect in March 2015. Its seat is in Vergt.

It consists of the following communes:

1. Beauregard-et-Bassac
2. Beleymas
3. Bourrou
4. Campsegret
5. Chalagnac
6. Clermont-de-Beauregard
7. Creyssensac-et-Pissot
8. Douville
9. Église-Neuve-de-Vergt
10. Église-Neuve-d'Issac
11. Eyraud-Crempse-Maurens
12. Fouleix
13. Grun-Bordas
14. Issac
15. Lacropte
16. Limeuil
17. Montagnac-la-Crempse
18. Paunat
19. Saint-Amand-de-Vergt
20. Saint-Georges-de-Montclard
21. Saint-Hilaire-d'Estissac
22. Saint-Jean-d'Estissac
23. Saint-Martin-des-Combes
24. Saint-Mayme-de-Péreyrol
25. Saint-Michel-de-Villadeix
26. Saint-Paul-de-Serre
27. Salon
28. Sanilhac (partly)
29. Trémolat
30. Val de Louyre et Caudeau
31. Vergt
32. Veyrines-de-Vergt
33. Villamblard
