= Saint-Michel-de-Villadeix =

- Commune
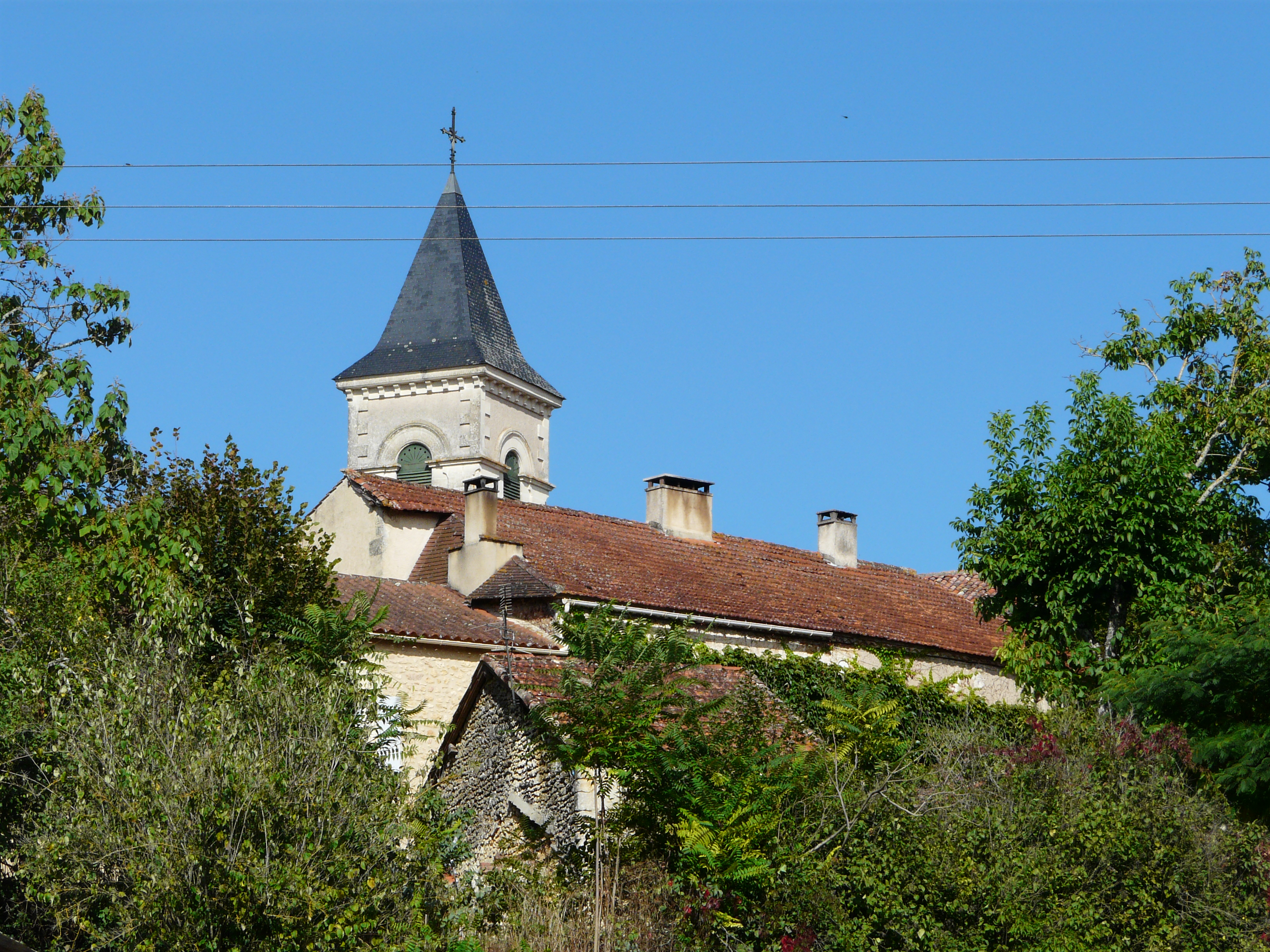
- The church in Saint-Michel-de-Villadeix
- Location of Saint-Michel-de-Villadeix
- Location within France Location within Nouvelle-Aquitaine
- Coordinates: 44°59′14″N 0°43′19″E
- Country: France
- Region: Nouvelle-Aquitaine
- Department: Dordogne
- Arrondissement: Périgueux
- Canton: Périgord Central
- Intercommunality: Le Grand Périgueux

Government
  - Mayor (2020–2026): Patrick Guillemet
- Area^{1}: 14.17 km^{2} (5.47 sq mi)
- Elevation: 165 m (541 ft)
- Highest elevation: 221 m (725 ft)
- Lowest elevation: 115 m (377 ft)
- Population (2023): 298
  - Density: 21.0/km^{2} (54.5/sq mi)
- Time zone: UTC+01:00 (CET)
  - Summer (DST): UTC+02:00 (CEST)
- INSEE/Postal code: 24468 /24380
- ^{1} French Land Register data, which excludes lakes, ponds, glaciers > 1 km^{2} (0.386 sq mi or 247 acres) and river estuaries.

Saint-Michel-de-Villadeix (Occitan: Sant Miquèl) is a commune in the Dordogne department in Nouvelle-Aquitaine in southwestern France.

== Population ==
Historical population
Year	Pop.	±% p.a.
1968	283	—
1975	248	−1.87%
1982	263	+0.84%
1990	258	−0.24%
1999	288	+1.23%
2007	291	+0.13%
2012	312	+1.40%
2017	309	−0.19%
2023	298	−0.60%
Source: INSEE

== See also ==
- Communes of the Dordogne department
