= Saint-Georges-de-Montclard =

Saint-Georges-de-Montclard Sent Jòrgi de Montclar
- Commune
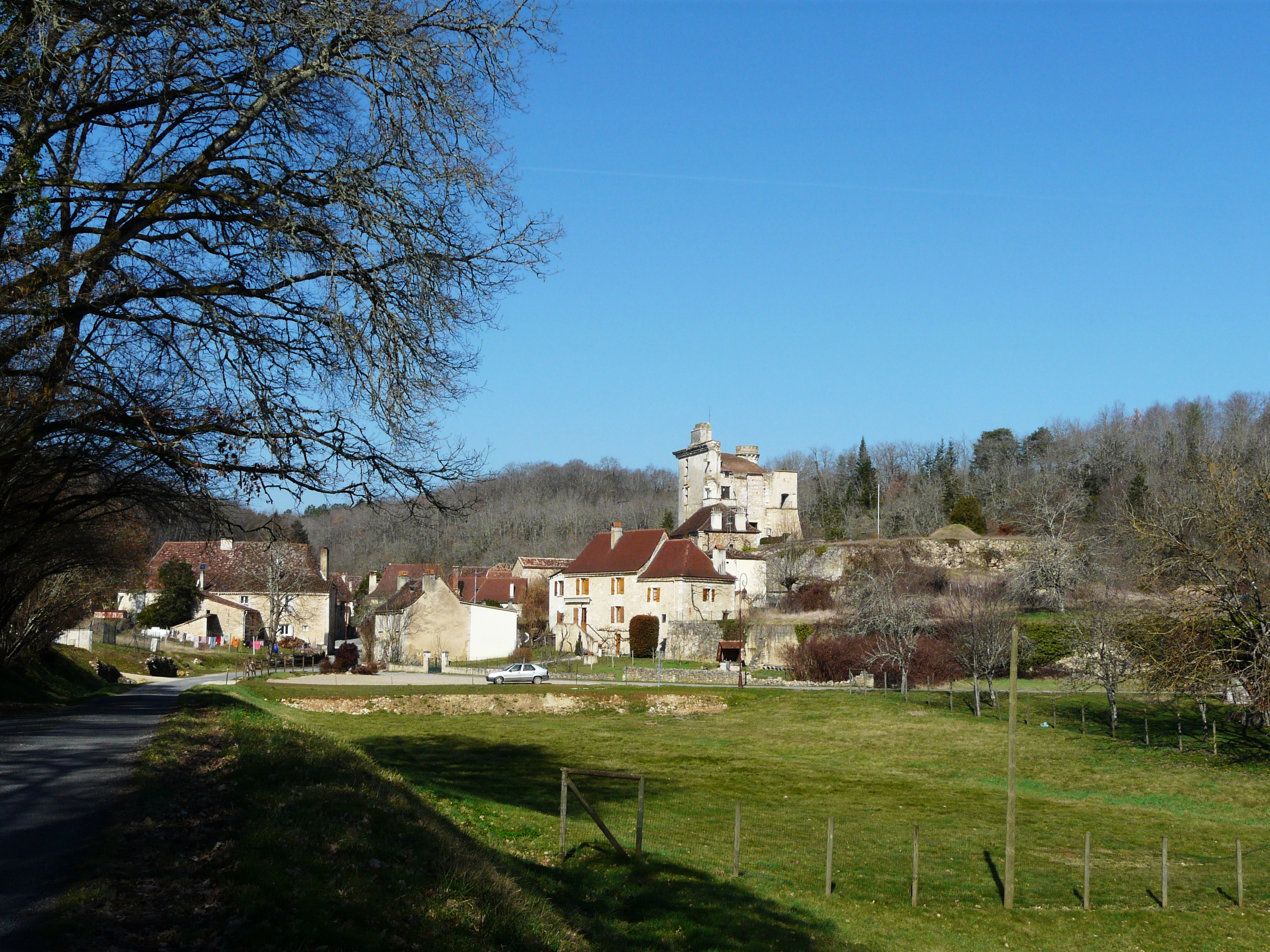
- A general view of Saint-Georges-de-Montclard

- Coat of arms
- Location of Saint-Georges-de-Montclard
- Location within France Location within Nouvelle-Aquitaine
- Coordinates: 44°55′59″N 0°37′19″E
- Country: France
- Region: Nouvelle-Aquitaine
- Department: Dordogne
- Arrondissement: Périgueux
- Canton: Périgord Central

Government
  - Mayor (2023–2026): Denis Dory
- Area^{1}: 13.68 km^{2} (5.28 sq mi)
- Elevation: 99 m (325 ft)
- Highest elevation: 189 m (620 ft)
- Lowest elevation: 62 m (203 ft)
- Population (2023): 270
  - Density: 20/km^{2} (51/sq mi)
- Time zone: UTC+01:00 (CET)
  - Summer (DST): UTC+02:00 (CEST)
- INSEE/Postal code: 24414 /24140
- ^{1} French Land Register data, which excludes lakes, ponds, glaciers > 1 km^{2} (0.386 sq mi or 247 acres) and river estuaries.

Saint-Georges-de-Montclard (French pronunciation: [sɛ̃ ʒɔʁʒ də mɔ̃klaʁ]; Occitan: Sent Jòrgi de Montclar) is a commune in the Dordogne department in Nouvelle-Aquitaine in southwestern France.

== Population ==
Historical population
Year	Pop.	±% p.a.
1968	273	—
1975	263	−0.53%
1982	262	−0.05%
1990	258	−0.19%
1999	268	+0.42%
2007	266	−0.09%
2012	281	+1.10%
2017	291	+0.70%
2023	270	−1.24%
Source: INSEE

== See also ==
- Communes of the Dordogne department
