= Clermont-de-Beauregard =

- Commune
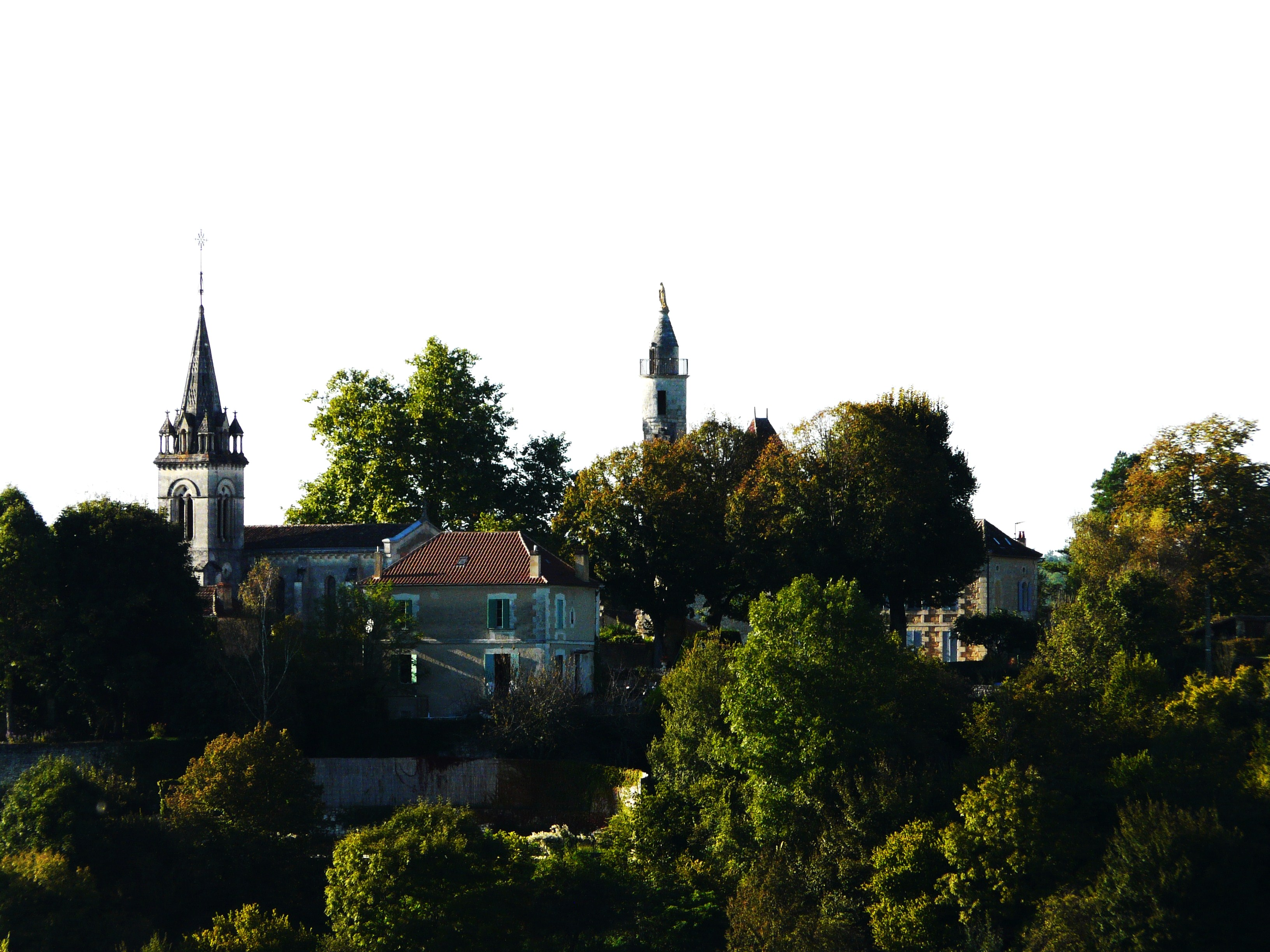
- A general view of Clermont-de-Beauregard
- Location of Clermont-de-Beauregard
- Location within France Location within Nouvelle-Aquitaine
- Coordinates: 44°57′09″N 0°38′25″E
- Country: France
- Region: Nouvelle-Aquitaine
- Department: Dordogne
- Arrondissement: Périgueux
- Canton: Périgord Central

Government
  - Mayor (2020–2026): Laurette Chinouilh
- Area^{1}: 6.24 km^{2} (2.41 sq mi)
- Elevation: 115 m (377 ft)
- Highest elevation: 164 m (538 ft)
- Lowest elevation: 75 m (246 ft)
- Population (2023): 120
  - Density: 19/km^{2} (50/sq mi)
- Time zone: UTC+01:00 (CET)
  - Summer (DST): UTC+02:00 (CEST)
- INSEE/Postal code: 24123 /24140
- ^{1} French Land Register data, which excludes lakes, ponds, glaciers > 1 km^{2} (0.386 sq mi or 247 acres) and river estuaries.

Clermont-de-Beauregard (Occitan: Clarmont de Beuregard) is a commune in the Dordogne department in Nouvelle-Aquitaine in southwestern France.

== Population ==
Historical population
Year	Pop.	±% p.a.
1968	102	—
1975	112	+1.35%
1982	128	+1.93%
1990	123	−0.50%
1999	123	+0.00%
2007	115	−0.84%
2012	118	+0.52%
2017	105	−2.31%
2023	120	+2.25%
Source: INSEE

== See also ==
- Communes of the Dordogne department
