= Saint-Hilaire-d'Estissac =

- Commune
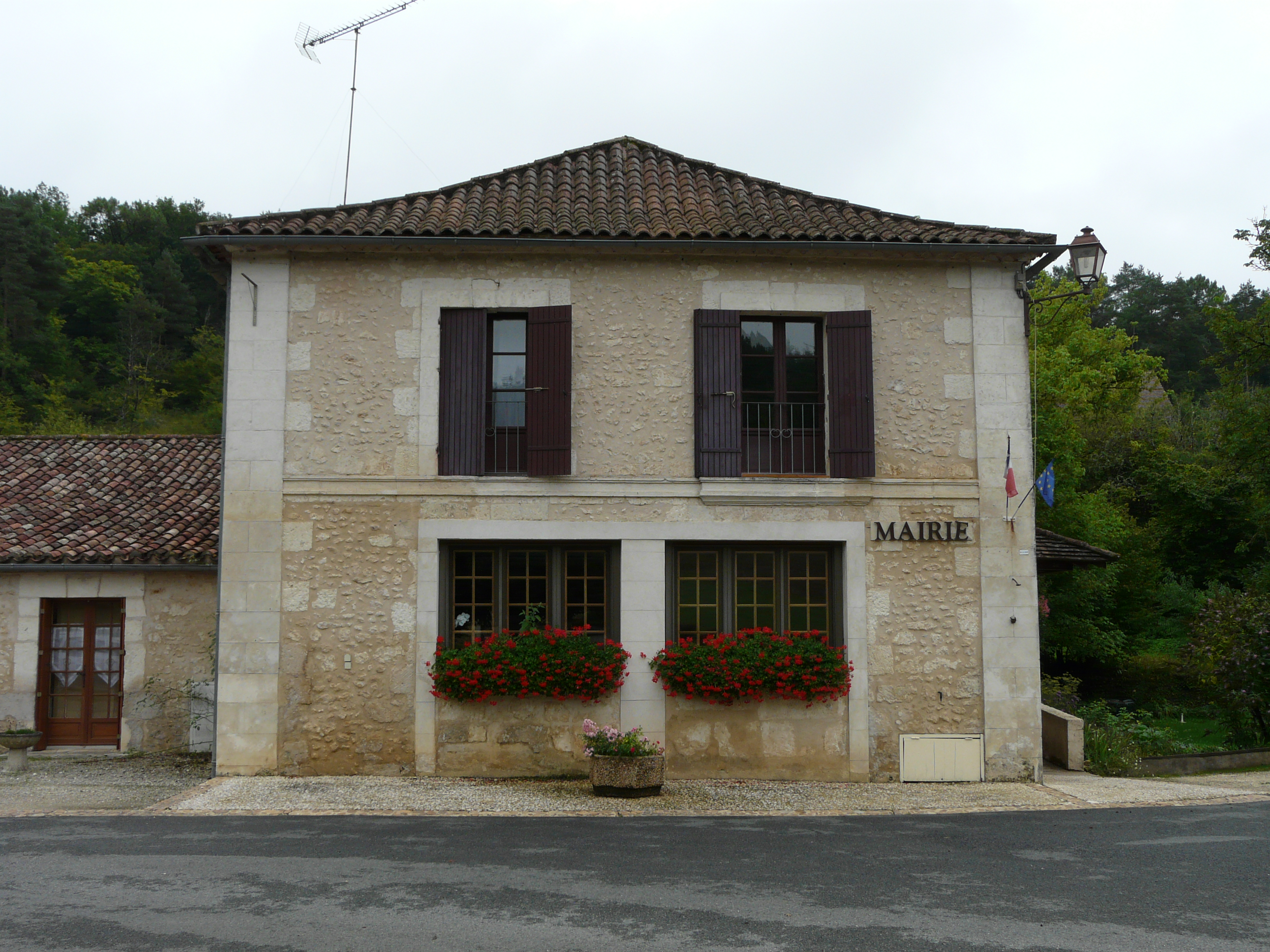
- The town hall in Saint-Hilaire-d'Estissac

- Coat of arms
- Location of Saint-Hilaire-d'Estissac
- Location within France Location within Nouvelle-Aquitaine
- Coordinates: 45°00′51″N 0°30′29″E
- Country: France
- Region: Nouvelle-Aquitaine
- Department: Dordogne
- Arrondissement: Périgueux
- Canton: Périgord Central

Government
  - Mayor (2020–2026): Jean-Claude Dareau
- Area^{1}: 6.14 km^{2} (2.37 sq mi)
- Elevation: 92 m (302 ft)
- Highest elevation: 186 m (610 ft)
- Lowest elevation: 77 m (253 ft)
- Population (2023): 130
  - Density: 21/km^{2} (55/sq mi)
- Time zone: UTC+01:00 (CET)
  - Summer (DST): UTC+02:00 (CEST)
- INSEE/Postal code: 24422 /24140
- ^{1} French Land Register data, which excludes lakes, ponds, glaciers > 1 km^{2} (0.386 sq mi or 247 acres) and river estuaries.

Saint-Hilaire-d'Estissac (French pronunciation: [sɛ̃.t‿ilɛʁ dɛstisak]; Occitan: Sent Alari d'Estiçac) is a commune in the Dordogne department in Nouvelle-Aquitaine in southwestern France.

== Population ==
Historical population
Year	Pop.	±% p.a.
1968	111	—
1975	89	−3.11%
1982	87	−0.32%
1990	110	+2.98%
1999	114	+0.40%
2007	112	−0.22%
2012	111	−0.18%
2017	112	+0.18%
2023	130	+2.52%
Source: INSEE

== See also ==
- Communes of the Dordogne department
