= Saint-Mayme-de-Péreyrol =

- Commune
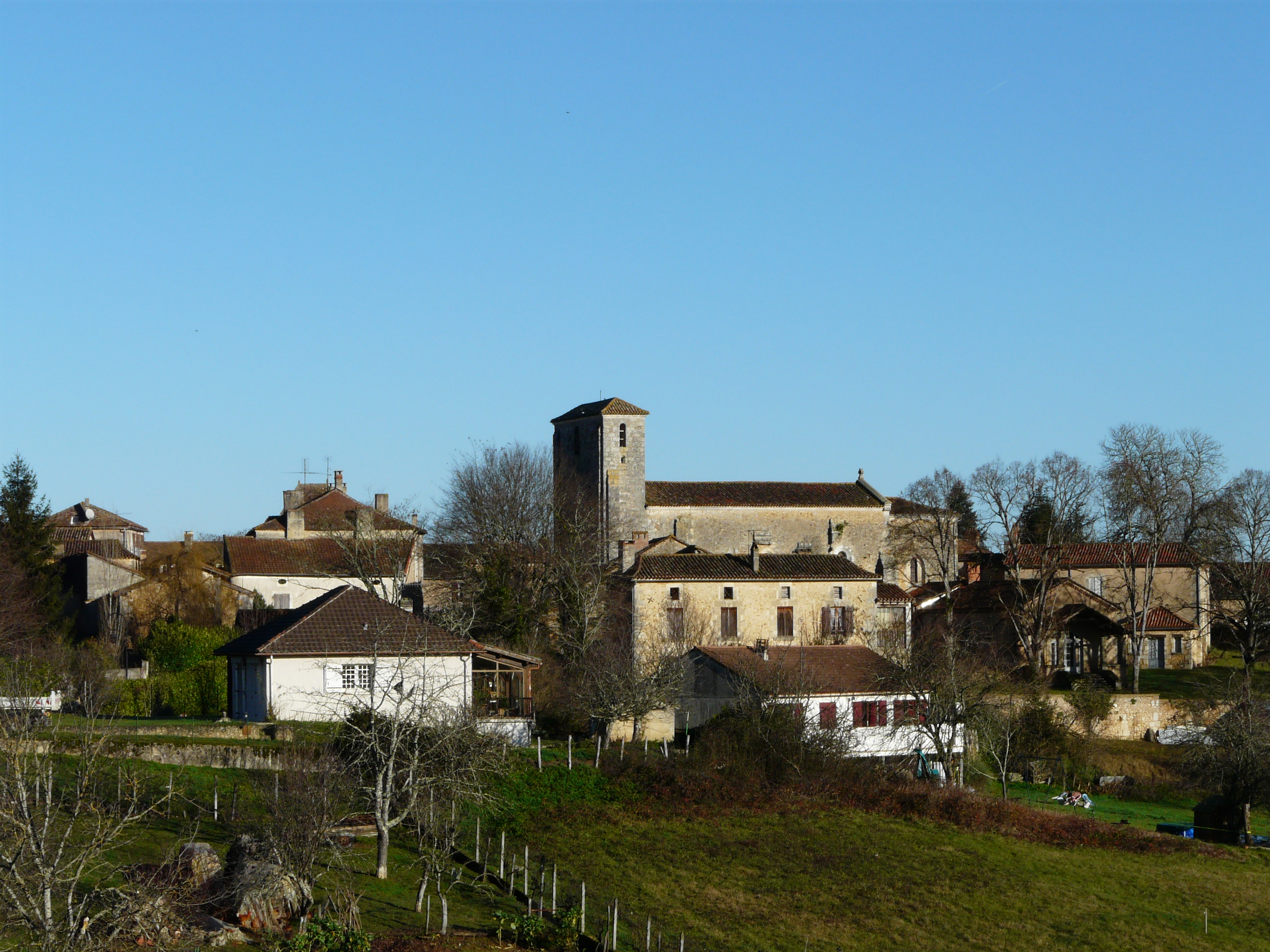
- A general view of Saint-Mayme-de-Péreyrol
- Location of Saint-Mayme-de-Péreyrol
- Location within France Location within Nouvelle-Aquitaine
- Coordinates: 45°00′56″N 0°38′52″E
- Country: France
- Region: Nouvelle-Aquitaine
- Department: Dordogne
- Arrondissement: Périgueux
- Canton: Périgord Central
- Intercommunality: Le Grand Périgueux

Government
  - Mayor (2020–2026): Denis Chapoul
- Area^{1}: 10.75 km^{2} (4.15 sq mi)
- Elevation: 228 m (748 ft)
- Highest elevation: 220 m (720 ft)
- Lowest elevation: 109 m (358 ft)
- Population (2023): 286
  - Density: 26.6/km^{2} (68.9/sq mi)
- Time zone: UTC+01:00 (CET)
  - Summer (DST): UTC+02:00 (CEST)
- INSEE/Postal code: 24459 /24380
- ^{1} French Land Register data, which excludes lakes, ponds, glaciers > 1 km^{2} (0.386 sq mi or 247 acres) and river estuaries.

Saint-Mayme-de-Péreyrol (French pronunciation: [sɛ̃ mɛm də peʁeʁɔl]; before 2020: Saint-Maime-de-Péreyrol; Occitan: Sent Maime de Perairòus) is a commune in the Dordogne department in Nouvelle-Aquitaine in southwestern France.

== Population ==
Historical population
Year	Pop.	±% p.a.
1968	270	—
1975	266	−0.21%
1982	276	+0.53%
1990	264	−0.55%
1999	265	+0.04%
2007	260	−0.24%
2012	273	+0.98%
2017	283	+0.72%
2023	286	+0.18%
Source: INSEE

== See also ==
- Communes of the Dordogne department
