= Bourrou =

- Commune
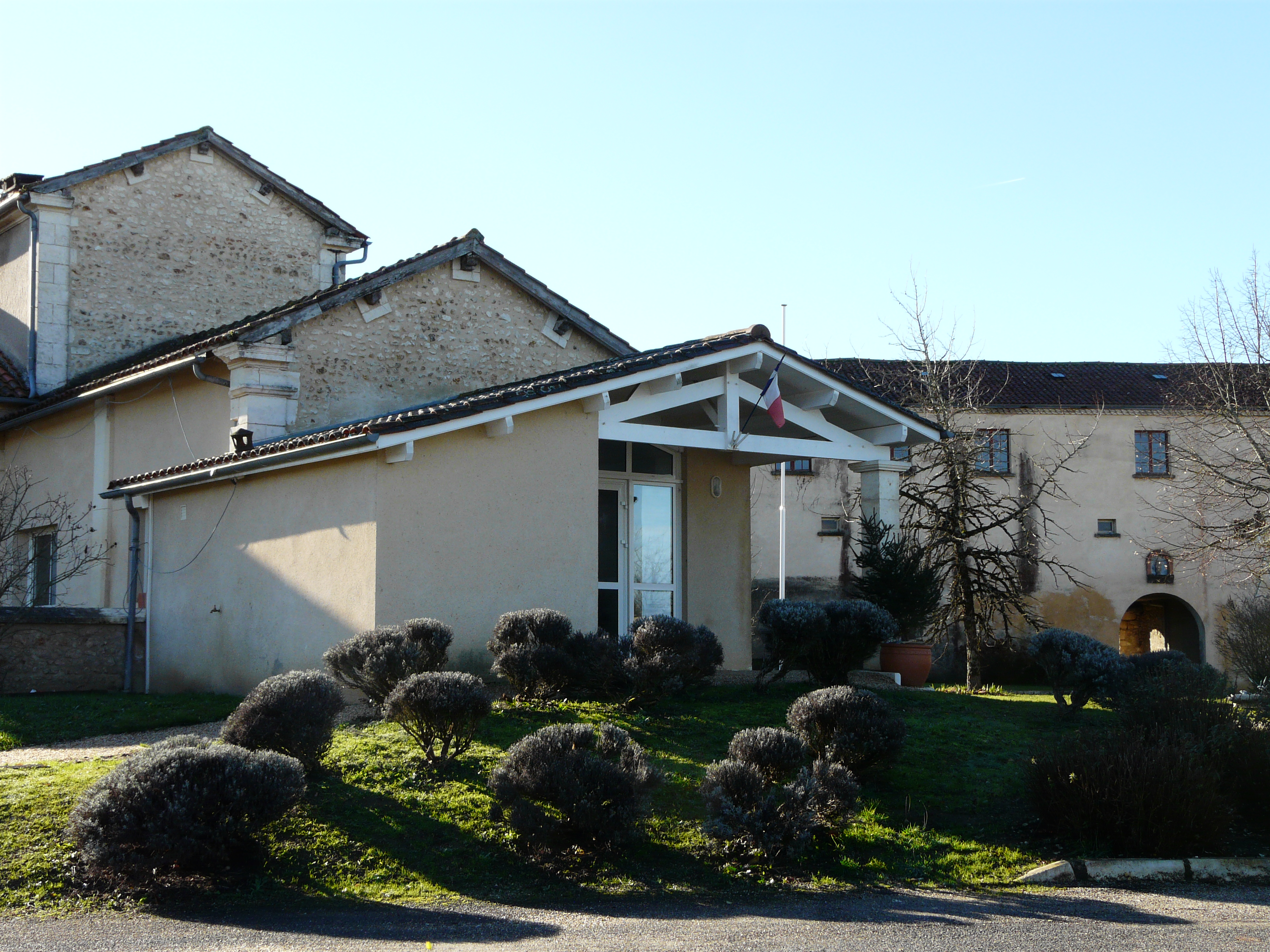
- The town hall in Bourrou
- Location of Bourrou
- Location within France Location within Nouvelle-Aquitaine
- Coordinates: 45°02′46″N 0°35′53″E
- Country: France
- Region: Nouvelle-Aquitaine
- Department: Dordogne
- Arrondissement: Périgueux
- Canton: Périgord Central
- Intercommunality: Le Grand Périgueux

Government
  - Mayor (2020–2026): Marie-Claude Kergoat
- Area^{1}: 9.13 km^{2} (3.53 sq mi)
- Elevation: 200 m (660 ft)
- Highest elevation: 233 m (764 ft)
- Lowest elevation: 110 m (360 ft)
- Population (2023): 139
  - Density: 15.2/km^{2} (39.4/sq mi)
- Time zone: UTC+01:00 (CET)
  - Summer (DST): UTC+02:00 (CEST)
- INSEE/Postal code: 24061 /24110
- ^{1} French Land Register data, which excludes lakes, ponds, glaciers > 1 km^{2} (0.386 sq mi or 247 acres) and river estuaries.

Bourrou (French pronunciation: [buʁu]; Occitan: Borron) is a commune in the Dordogne department in southwestern France.

== Population ==
Historical population
Year	Pop.	±% p.a.
1968	189	—
1975	173	−1.26%
1982	176	+0.25%
1990	155	−1.58%
1999	153	−0.14%
2007	152	−0.08%
2012	134	−2.49%
2017	128	−0.91%
2023	139	+1.38%
Source: INSEE

== See also ==
- Communes of the Dordogne département
