= Lacropte =

- Commune
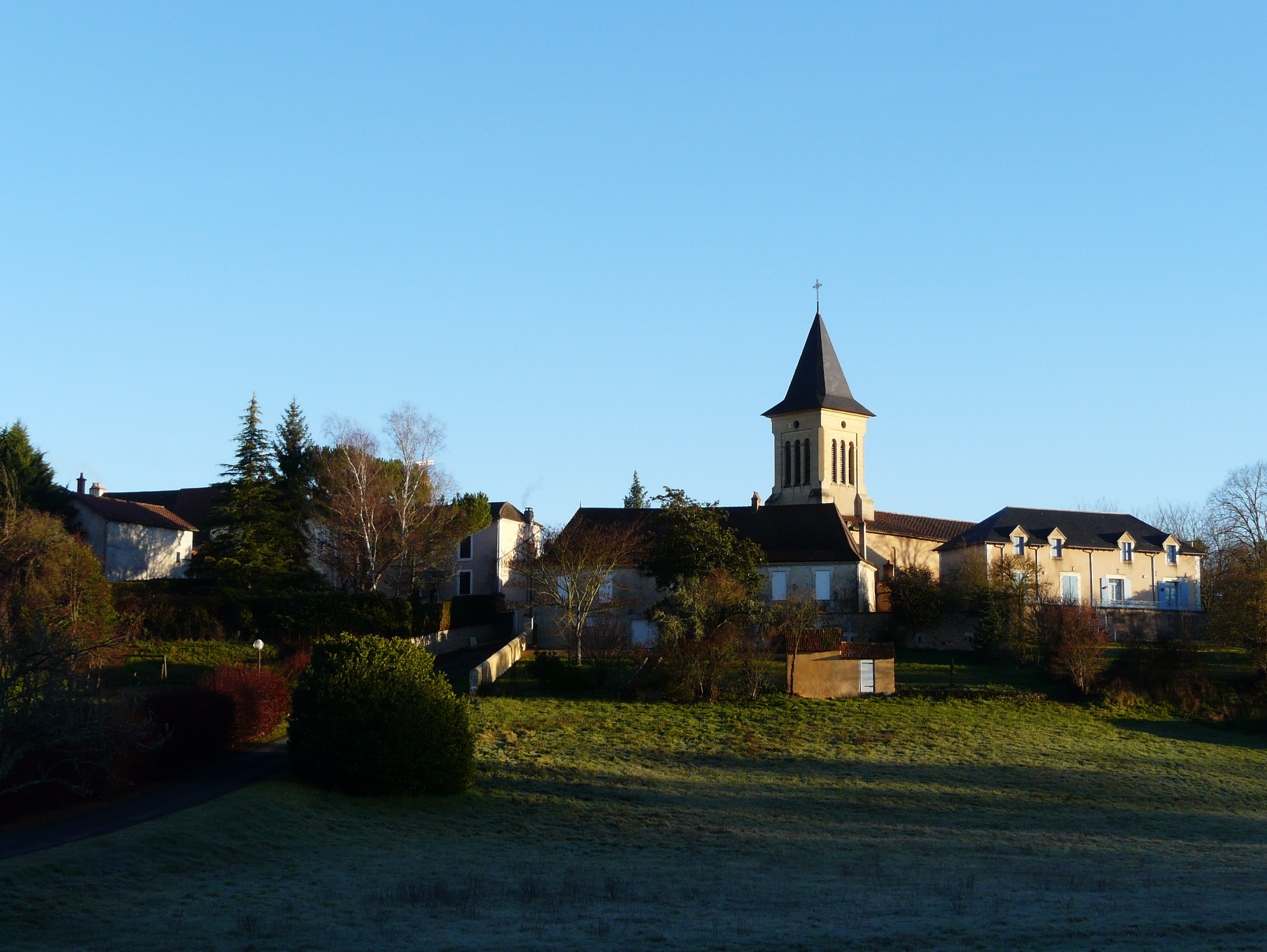
- A general view of Lacropte

- Coat of arms
- Location of Lacropte
- Location within France Location within Nouvelle-Aquitaine
- Coordinates: 45°02′15″N 0°49′55″E
- Country: France
- Region: Nouvelle-Aquitaine
- Department: Dordogne
- Arrondissement: Périgueux
- Canton: Périgord Central
- Intercommunality: Le Grand Périgueux

Government
  - Mayor (2020–2026): Claudine Faure
- Area^{1}: 26.23 km^{2} (10.13 sq mi)
- Elevation: 196 m (643 ft)
- Highest elevation: 266 m (873 ft)
- Lowest elevation: 168 m (551 ft)
- Population (2023): 699
  - Density: 26.6/km^{2} (69.0/sq mi)
- Time zone: UTC+01:00 (CET)
  - Summer (DST): UTC+02:00 (CEST)
- INSEE/Postal code: 24220 /24380
- ^{1} French Land Register data, which excludes lakes, ponds, glaciers > 1 km^{2} (0.386 sq mi or 247 acres) and river estuaries.

Lacropte (French pronunciation: [lakʁɔpt]; Occitan: La Cròpta) is a commune in the Dordogne department, Nouvelle-Aquitaine, southwestern France. Its origins date back to the 12th century when it was associated with a crypt.

== Population ==
Historical population
| Year | Pop. | ±% p.a. |
|---|---|---|
| 1968 | 596 | — |
| 1975 | 549 | −1.17% |
| 1982 | 569 | +0.51% |
| 1990 | 562 | −0.15% |
| 1999 | 609 | +0.90% |
| 2007 | 615 | +0.12% |
| 2012 | 646 | +0.99% |
| 2017 | 651 | +0.15% |
| 2023 | 699 | +1.19% |
Source: INSEE

== See also ==
- Communes of the Dordogne department
