= Fouleix =

- Commune
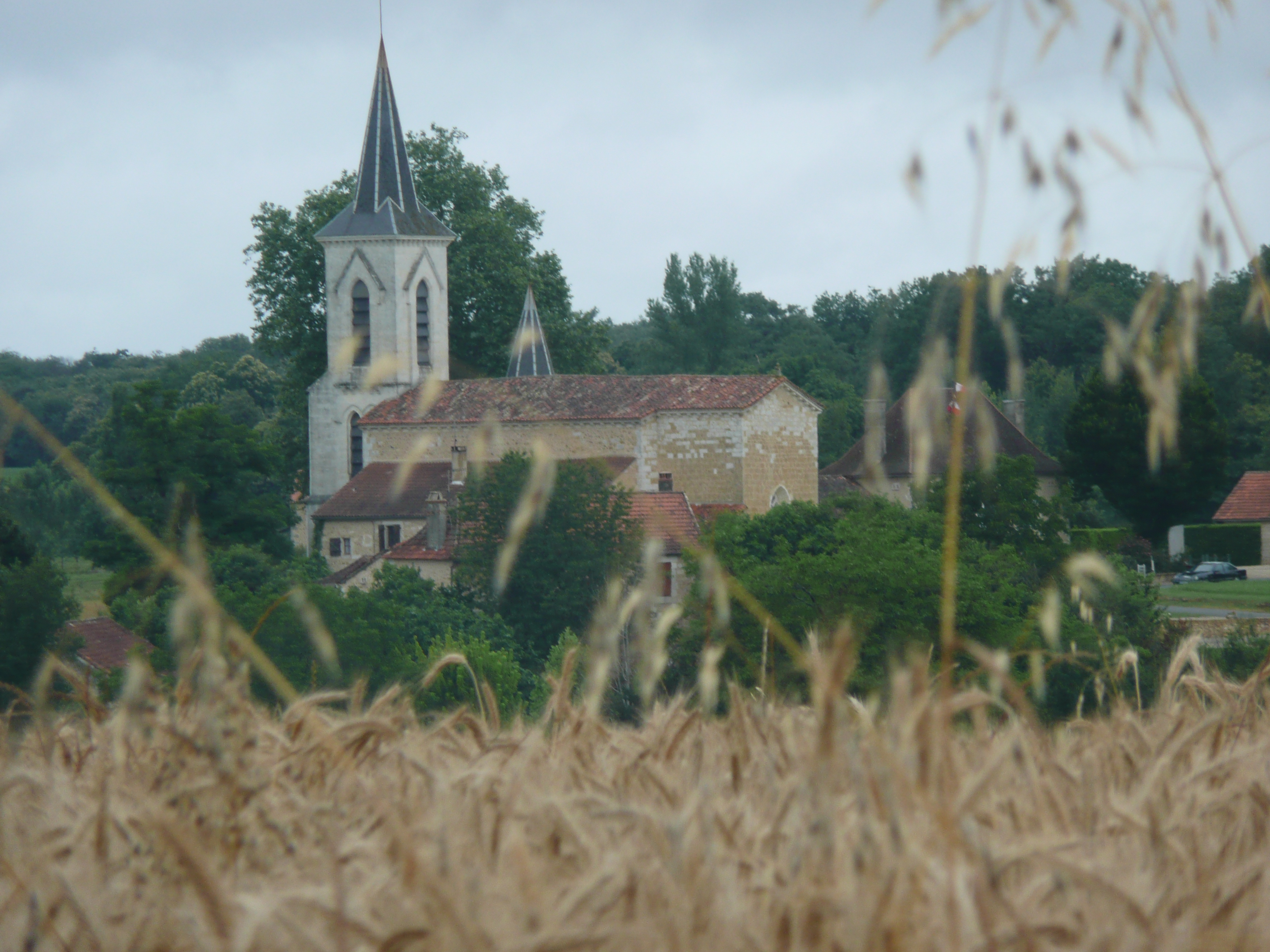
- The church in Fouleix
- Location of Fouleix
- Location within France Location within Nouvelle-Aquitaine
- Coordinates: 44°59′07″N 0°40′52″E
- Country: France
- Region: Nouvelle-Aquitaine
- Department: Dordogne
- Arrondissement: Périgueux
- Canton: Périgord Central
- Intercommunality: Le Grand Périgueux

Government
  - Mayor (2020–2026): Emmanuel Legay
- Area^{1}: 10.94 km^{2} (4.22 sq mi)
- Elevation: 181 m (594 ft)
- Highest elevation: 216 m (709 ft)
- Lowest elevation: 90 m (300 ft)
- Population (2023): 277
  - Density: 25.3/km^{2} (65.6/sq mi)
- Time zone: UTC+01:00 (CET)
  - Summer (DST): UTC+02:00 (CEST)
- INSEE/Postal code: 24190 /24380
- ^{1} French Land Register data, which excludes lakes, ponds, glaciers > 1 km^{2} (0.386 sq mi or 247 acres) and river estuaries.

Fouleix (French pronunciation: [fulɛ]; Occitan: Folés) is a commune in the Dordogne department in Nouvelle-Aquitaine in southwestern France. In Occitan, the town is called Folés.

== Population ==
Historical population
| Year | Pop. | ±% p.a. |
|---|---|---|
| 1968 | 209 | — |
| 1975 | 188 | −1.50% |
| 1982 | 172 | −1.26% |
| 1990 | 186 | +0.98% |
| 1999 | 204 | +1.03% |
| 2007 | 197 | −0.44% |
| 2012 | 228 | +2.97% |
| 2017 | 248 | +1.70% |
| 2023 | 277 | +1.86% |
Source: INSEE

== See also ==
- Communes of the Dordogne department
