= Escoire =

- Commune
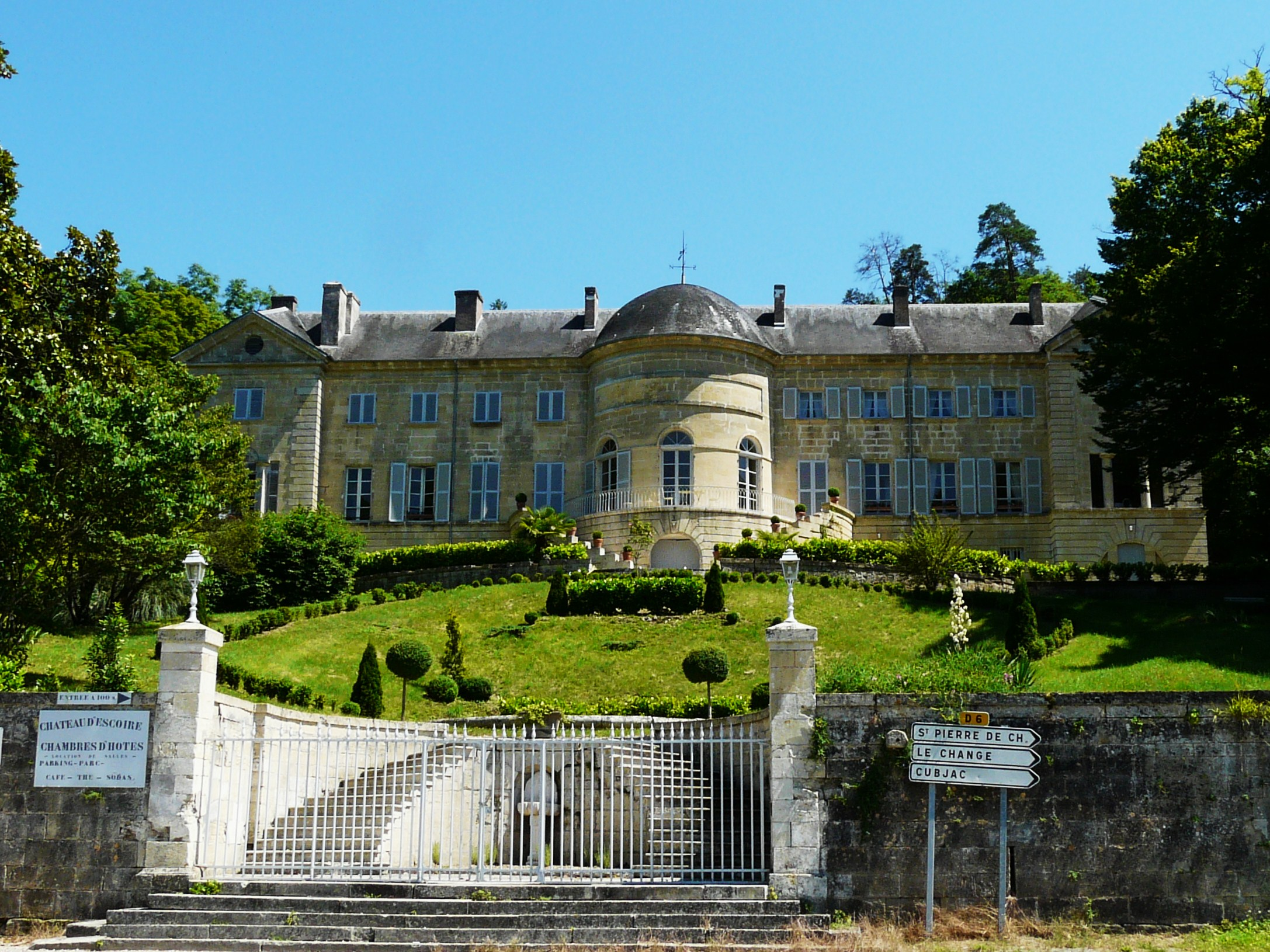
- Château d'Escoire
- Location of Escoire
- Location within France Location within Nouvelle-Aquitaine
- Coordinates: 45°12′41″N 0°51′01″E
- Country: France
- Region: Nouvelle-Aquitaine
- Department: Dordogne
- Arrondissement: Périgueux
- Canton: Trélissac
- Intercommunality: Le Grand Périgueux

Government
  - Mayor (2020–2026): Joël Laguionie
- Area^{1}: 3.94 km^{2} (1.52 sq mi)
- Elevation: 100 m (330 ft)
- Highest elevation: 213 m (699 ft)
- Lowest elevation: 92 m (302 ft)
- Population (2023): 401
  - Density: 102/km^{2} (264/sq mi)
- Time zone: UTC+01:00 (CET)
  - Summer (DST): UTC+02:00 (CEST)
- INSEE/Postal code: 24162 /24420
- ^{1} French Land Register data, which excludes lakes, ponds, glaciers > 1 km^{2} (0.386 sq mi or 247 acres) and river estuaries.

Escoire (French pronunciation: [ɛskwaʁ]; Occitan: Escoira) is a commune in the Dordogne department in Nouvelle-Aquitaine in southwestern France.

== Population ==
Historical population
Year	Pop.	±% p.a.
1968	168	—
1975	177	+0.75%
1982	234	+4.07%
1990	367	+5.79%
1999	429	+1.75%
2007	461	+0.90%
2012	448	−0.57%
2017	418	−1.38%
2023	401	−0.69%
Source: INSEE

== See also ==
- Communes of the Dordogne department
