= Le Grand Périgueux =

- Communauté d'agglomération
- Interactive map of Le Grand Périgueux
- Coordinates: 45°11′N 00°43′E
- Country: France
- Region: Nouvelle-Aquitaine
- Department: Dordogne
- No. of communes: {{{nbcomm}}}
- Established: 2014
- Area: 993.3 km^{2} (383.5 sq mi)
- Population (2017): 103,576
  - Density: 104.3/km^{2} (270.1/sq mi)
- Website: www.grandperigueux.fr

Le Grand Périgueux is the communauté d'agglomération, an intercommunal structure, centred on the city of Périgueux. It is located in the Dordogne department, in the Nouvelle-Aquitaine region, southwestern France. It was created in January 2014. Its seat is in Périgueux. Its area is 993.3 km^{2}. Its population was 103,576 in 2017, of which 29,966 in Périgueux proper.

== Composition ==
The communauté d'agglomération consists of the following 43 communes:

1. Agonac
2. Annesse-et-Beaulieu
3. Antonne-et-Trigonant
4. Bassillac et Auberoche
5. Boulazac Isle Manoire
6. Bourrou
7. Chalagnac
8. Champcevinel
9. Chancelade
10. La Chapelle-Gonaguet
11. Château-l'Évêque
12. Cornille
13. Coulounieix-Chamiers
14. Coursac
15. Creyssensac-et-Pissot
16. La Douze
17. Église-Neuve-de-Vergt
18. Escoire
19. Fouleix
20. Grun-Bordas
21. Lacropte
22. Manzac-sur-Vern
23. Marsac-sur-l'Isle
24. Mensignac
25. Paunat
26. Périgueux
27. Razac-sur-l'Isle
28. Saint-Amand-de-Vergt
29. Saint-Crépin-d'Auberoche
30. Saint-Geyrac
31. Saint-Mayme-de-Péreyrol
32. Saint-Michel-de-Villadeix
33. Saint-Paul-de-Serre
34. Saint-Pierre-de-Chignac
35. Salon
36. Sanilhac
37. Sarliac-sur-l'Isle
38. Savignac-les-Églises
39. Sorges et Ligueux en Périgord
40. Trélissac
41. Val de Louyre et Caudeau
42. Vergt
43. Veyrines-de-Vergt
