= Saint-Paul-de-Serre =

- Commune
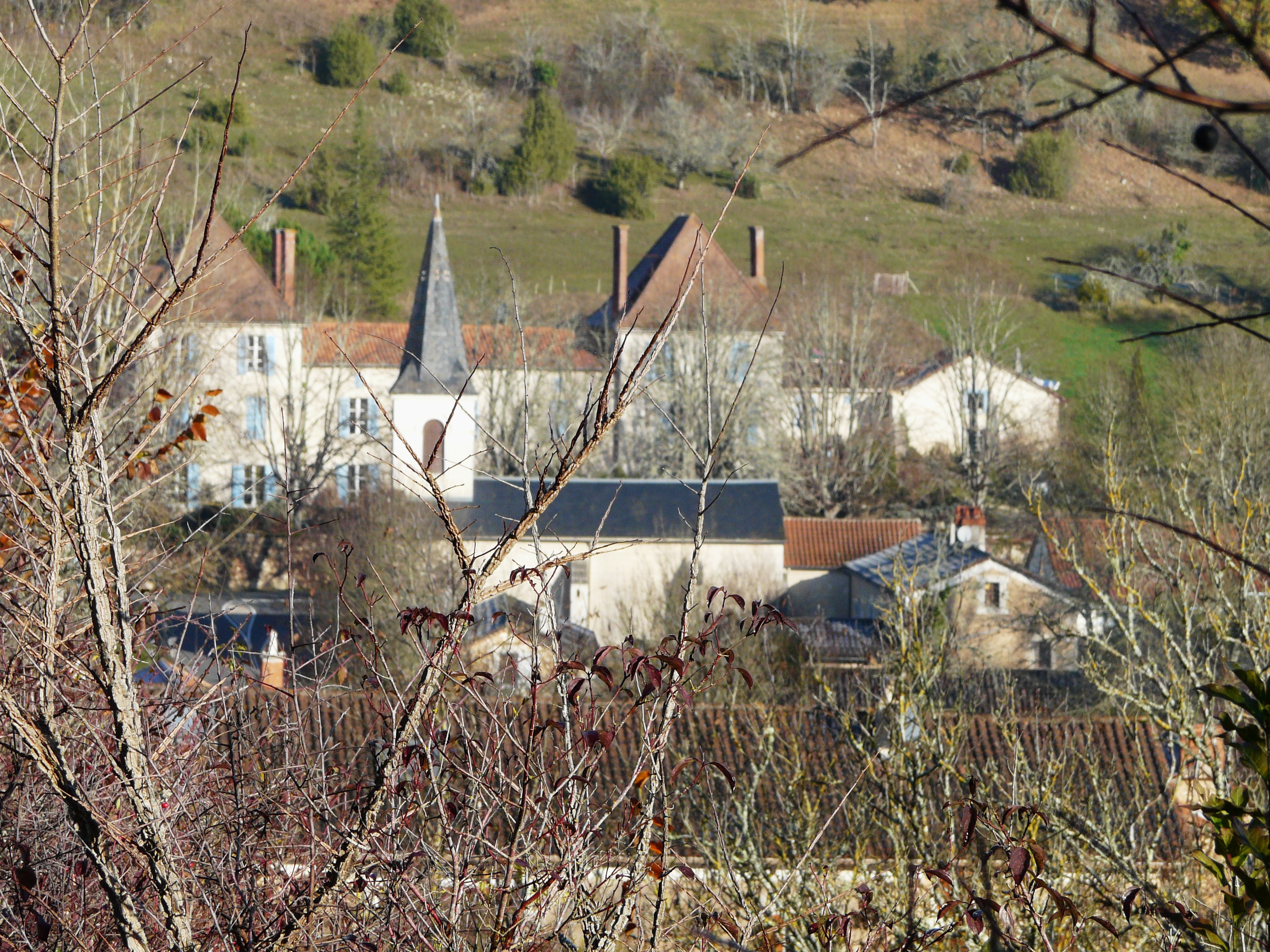
- A general view of Saint-Paul-de-Serre
- Location of Saint-Paul-de-Serre
- Location within France Location within Nouvelle-Aquitaine
- Coordinates: 45°05′21″N 0°38′04″E
- Country: France
- Region: Nouvelle-Aquitaine
- Department: Dordogne
- Arrondissement: Périgueux
- Canton: Périgord Central
- Intercommunality: Le Grand Périgueux

Government
  - Mayor (2022–2026): Florian Chantegreil
- Area^{1}: 10.44 km^{2} (4.03 sq mi)
- Elevation: 100 m (330 ft)
- Highest elevation: 214 m (702 ft)
- Lowest elevation: 91 m (299 ft)
- Population (2023): 337
  - Density: 32.3/km^{2} (83.6/sq mi)
- Time zone: UTC+01:00 (CET)
  - Summer (DST): UTC+02:00 (CEST)
- INSEE/Postal code: 24480 /24380
- ^{1} French Land Register data, which excludes lakes, ponds, glaciers > 1 km^{2} (0.386 sq mi or 247 acres) and river estuaries.

Saint-Paul-de-Serre (Limousin: Sent Pau de Serra) is a commune in the Dordogne department in Nouvelle-Aquitaine in southwestern France.

== Population ==
Historical population
Year	Pop.	±% p.a.
1968	199	—
1975	187	−0.88%
1982	155	−2.65%
1990	208	+3.74%
1999	236	+1.41%
2007	259	+1.17%
2012	258	−0.08%
2017	280	+1.65%
2023	337	+3.14%
Source: INSEE

== See also ==
- Communes of the Dordogne department
