= Saint-Martin-des-Combes =

- Commune
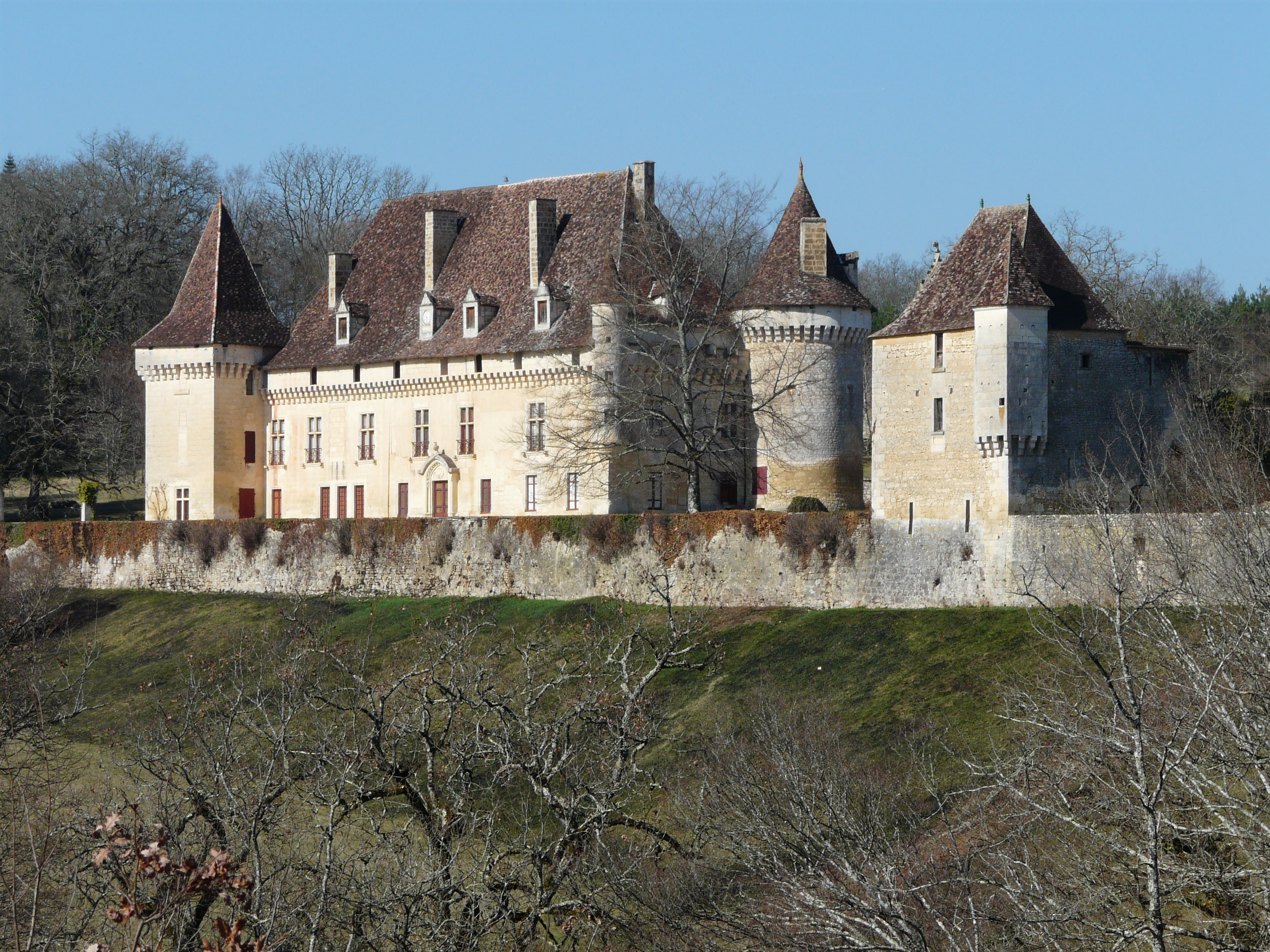
- Chateau of Gaubertie

- Coat of arms
- Location of Saint-Martin-des-Combes
- Location within France Location within Nouvelle-Aquitaine
- Coordinates: 44°57′27″N 0°36′58″E
- Country: France
- Region: Nouvelle-Aquitaine
- Department: Dordogne
- Arrondissement: Périgueux
- Canton: Périgord Central

Government
  - Mayor (2020–2026): François Ritlewski
- Area^{1}: 13.99 km^{2} (5.40 sq mi)
- Elevation: 120 m (390 ft)
- Highest elevation: 205 m (673 ft)
- Lowest elevation: 80 m (260 ft)
- Population (2023): 205
  - Density: 14.7/km^{2} (38.0/sq mi)
- Time zone: UTC+01:00 (CET)
  - Summer (DST): UTC+02:00 (CEST)
- INSEE/Postal code: 24456 /24140
- ^{1} French Land Register data, which excludes lakes, ponds, glaciers > 1 km^{2} (0.386 sq mi or 247 acres) and river estuaries.

Saint-Martin-des-Combes (French pronunciation: [sɛ̃ maʁtɛ̃ de kɔ̃b]; Occitan: Sent Martin de las Combas) is a commune in the Dordogne department in Nouvelle-Aquitaine in southwestern France.

== Population ==
Historical population
Year	Pop.	±% p.a.
1968	150	—
1975	132	−1.81%
1982	134	+0.22%
1990	151	+1.50%
1999	180	+1.97%
2007	194	+0.94%
2012	190	−0.42%
2017	186	−0.42%
2023	205	+1.63%
Source: INSEE

== See also ==
- Communes of the Dordogne department
