= Beauregard-et-Bassac =

- Commune
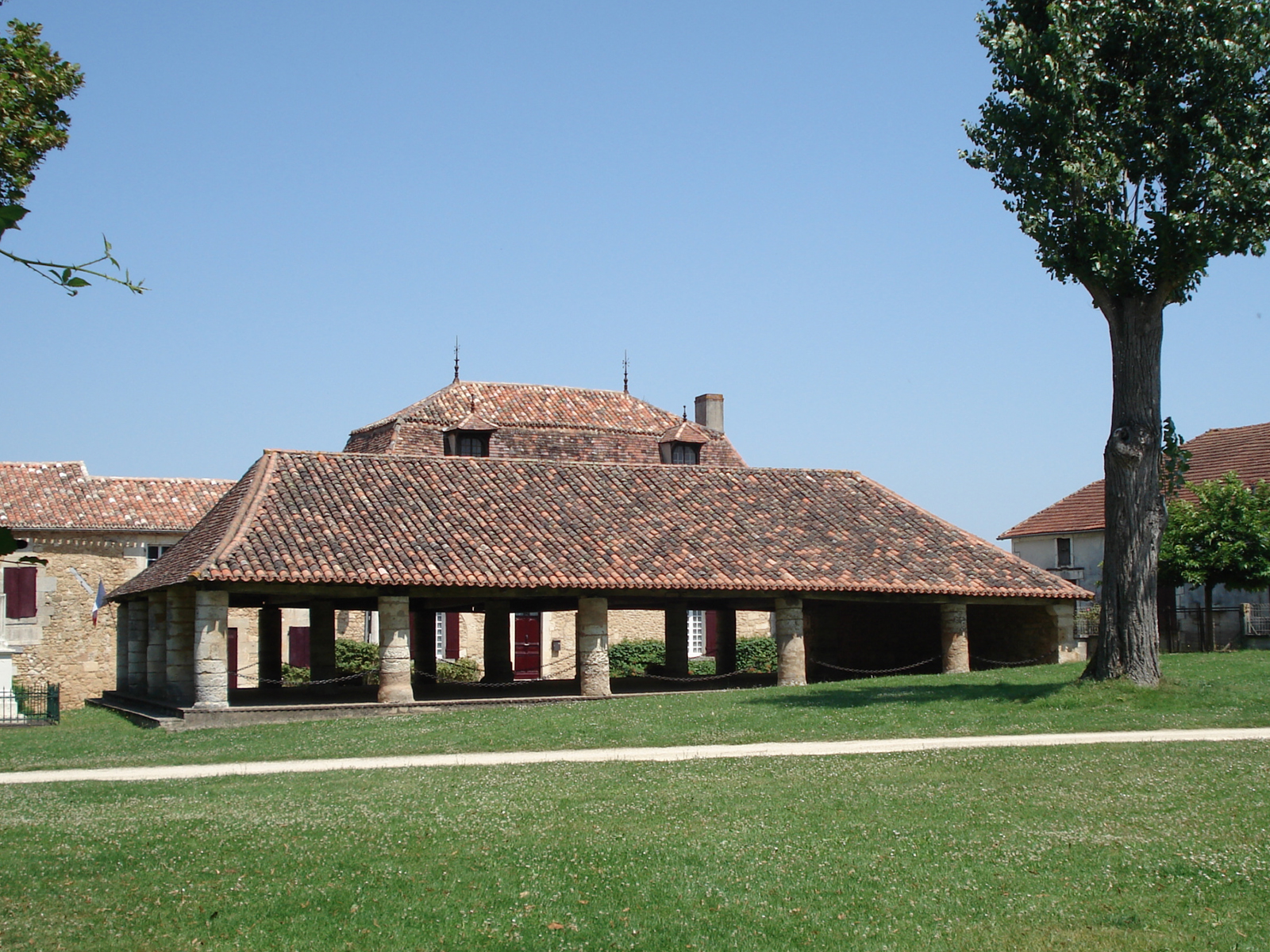
- Covered market
- Location of Beauregard-et-Bassac
- Location within France Location within Nouvelle-Aquitaine
- Coordinates: 44°59′19″N 0°38′34″E
- Country: France
- Region: Nouvelle-Aquitaine
- Department: Dordogne
- Arrondissement: Périgueux
- Canton: Périgord Central

Government
  - Mayor (2020–2026): Flore Boyer
- Area^{1}: 12.02 km^{2} (4.64 sq mi)
- Elevation: 175 m (574 ft)
- Highest elevation: 229 m (751 ft)
- Lowest elevation: 125 m (410 ft)
- Population (2023): 309
  - Density: 25.7/km^{2} (66.6/sq mi)
- Time zone: UTC+01:00 (CET)
  - Summer (DST): UTC+02:00 (CEST)
- INSEE/Postal code: 24031 /24140
- ^{1} French Land Register data, which excludes lakes, ponds, glaciers > 1 km^{2} (0.386 sq mi or 247 acres) and river estuaries.

Beauregard-et-Bassac is a commune in the Dordogne department in southwestern France.

== Population ==
Historical population
Year	Pop.	±% p.a.
1968	203	—
1975	206	+0.21%
1982	193	−0.93%
1990	209	+1.00%
1999	197	−0.65%
2007	285	+4.72%
2012	279	−0.42%
2017	262	−1.25%
2023	309	+2.79%
Source: INSEE

== See also ==
- Communes of the Dordogne department
