= Saint-Amand-de-Vergt =

- Commune
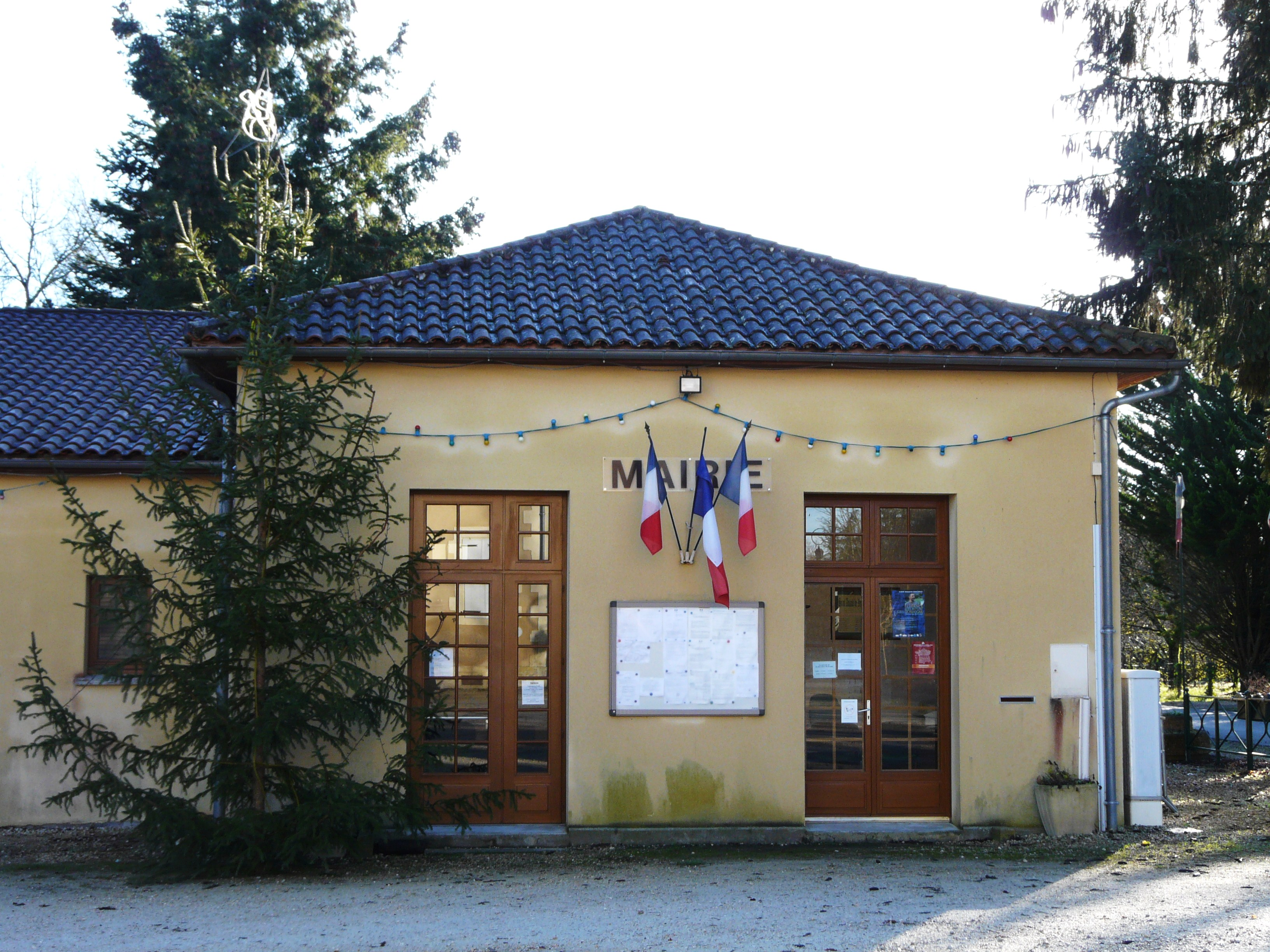
- The town hall in Saint-Amand-de-Vergt

- Coat of arms
- Location of Saint-Amand-de-Vergt
- Location within France Location within Nouvelle-Aquitaine
- Coordinates: 44°59′17″N 0°41′54″E
- Country: France
- Region: Nouvelle-Aquitaine
- Department: Dordogne
- Arrondissement: Périgueux
- Canton: Périgord Central
- Intercommunality: Le Grand Périgueux

Government
  - Mayor (2020–2026): Jean-Luc Mallet
- Area^{1}: 12.66 km^{2} (4.89 sq mi)
- Elevation: 200 m (660 ft)
- Highest elevation: 215 m (705 ft)
- Lowest elevation: 110 m (360 ft)
- Population (2023): 242
  - Density: 19.1/km^{2} (49.5/sq mi)
- Time zone: UTC+01:00 (CET)
  - Summer (DST): UTC+02:00 (CEST)
- INSEE/Postal code: 24365 /24380
- ^{1} French Land Register data, which excludes lakes, ponds, glaciers > 1 km^{2} (0.386 sq mi or 247 acres) and river estuaries.

Saint-Amand-de-Vergt (French pronunciation: [sɛ̃.t‿amɑ̃ də vɛʁ], literally Saint-Amand of Vergt; Occitan: Sench Amand de Vern) is a commune in the Dordogne department in Nouvelle-Aquitaine in southwestern France.

== Population ==
Historical population
Year	Pop.	±% p.a.
1968	235	—
1975	207	−1.80%
1982	176	−2.29%
1990	173	−0.21%
1999	199	+1.57%
2007	208	+0.55%
2012	237	+2.64%
2017	243	+0.50%
2023	242	−0.07%
Source: INSEE

== See also ==
- Communes of the Dordogne department
