= Saint-Paul-la-Roche =

- Commune
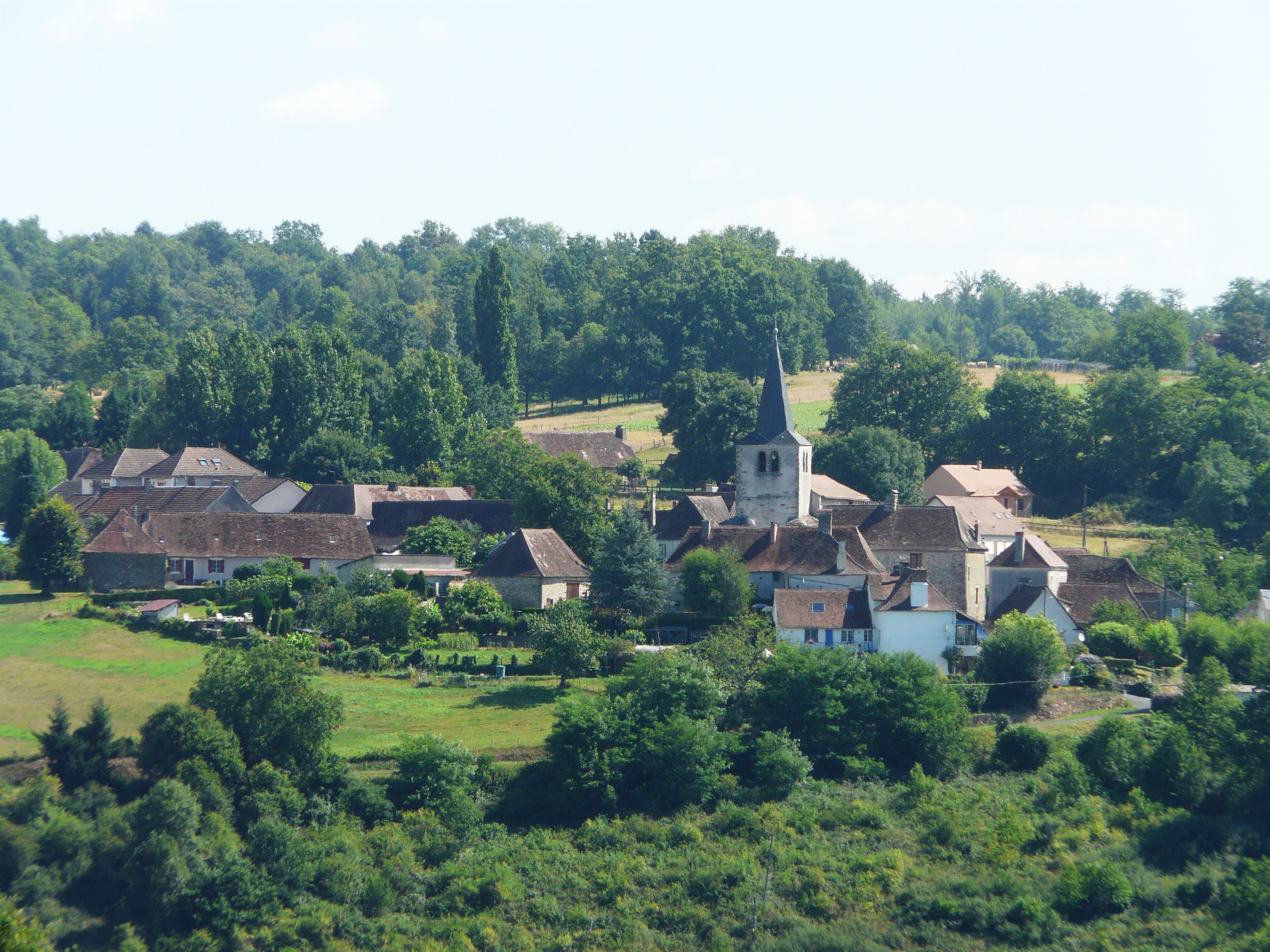
- A general view of Saint-Paul-la-Roche
- Location of Saint-Paul-la-Roche
- Location within France Location within Nouvelle-Aquitaine
- Coordinates: 45°28′43″N 0°59′59″E
- Country: France
- Region: Nouvelle-Aquitaine
- Department: Dordogne
- Arrondissement: Nontron
- Canton: Thiviers

Government
  - Mayor (2020–2026): Didier Garnaudie
- Area^{1}: 39.22 km^{2} (15.14 sq mi)
- Elevation: 268 m (879 ft)
- Highest elevation: 342 m (1,122 ft)
- Lowest elevation: 165 m (541 ft)
- Population (2023): 542
  - Density: 13.8/km^{2} (35.8/sq mi)
- Time zone: UTC+01:00 (CET)
  - Summer (DST): UTC+02:00 (CEST)
- INSEE/Postal code: 24481 /24800
- ^{1} French Land Register data, which excludes lakes, ponds, glaciers > 1 km^{2} (0.386 sq mi or 247 acres) and river estuaries.

Saint-Paul-la-Roche (French pronunciation: [sɛ̃ pɔl la ʁɔʃ]; Limousin: Sent Pau la Ròcha), is a commune in the northeast of the Dordogne department in the Nouvelle-Aquitaine region in southwestern France. The commune is integrated into the Regional Natural Parc Périgord Limousin.

== Etymology ==
The commune's name is derived from Saint Paul and the hamlet La Roche (the rock) referring to the white quartz rocks (La Roche Blanche) cropping out nearby.

== Geography ==
Saint-Paul-la-Roche is situated 9 kilometers northeast of Thiviers and 5 kilometers west-southwest of Jumilhac-le-Grand. It is surrounded by the following communes:

- Saint-Priest-les-Fougères in the north.
- Jumilhac-le-Grand in the northeast and east.
- Sarrazac in the southeast.
- Nantheuil in the south.
- Thiviers in the southwest.
- Saint-Jory-de-Chalais in the west.
- Chalais in the west.
- La Coquille in the northwest.

Besides the main village the commune consists of the following hamlets, farms, mills and castles: Artis, Beauplat, Chalamant, Chandeuil, Château de Chalard, Château de Montardy, Château la Val(l)ade, Combier, Curmont, Eleix, Graffanaud, La Brousse, La Bussière, La Chassagne, La Croze, La Fagnade, La Farge, La Genetterie, La Grave, La Jarrige, La Lande de Beauplat, La Lande de la Peyzie, La Lande de Perrières, La Messeillasse, La Messelie, La Morandie, La Mouretie, La Papalie, La Petite Lande, La Petite Pouge, La Peyzie, La Pouille, La Pouyade d'Artis, La Renolphie, La Rivalie, La Roche, La Tuillère, La Val(l)ade, Lascombas, Lavaud, Le Chalard, Le Chalaret, Le Chatenet, Le Chêne Blanc, Le Goinaud, Le Grand Bois, Le Marguillier, Le Minaret, Le Moulin de la Brousse, Le Moulin de la Peyzie, Le Moulin du Breuilh, Le Petit Clos, (Le) Pierrefiche, Le Rieu Mort, Le Rouchoux de la Forêt, Les Pradelles de Chalamant, Les Pradelles de Lintignac, Lintignac, Paradinas, Poirier Bernard, Poirier Vachat, Pont-Fermier and Vialotte.

The southwest-flowing river Isle forms the southeastern boundary of the commune with Sarrazac and Jumilhac-le-Grand. The commune is drained in a southerly direction by the small river Rochille. Just before reaching the southern border the Rochille merges with the Valouse as its major left-hand tributary. The Valouse traverses the western side of the commune's territory (following a south-southwesterly direction) and represents for several kilometers the boundary with Chalais. After its confluence with the Rochille it ends shortly after as a right-hand tributary to the Isle. Immediately after having touched the commune's perimeter in the southeast the Isle receives four small right-hand tributaries, whose valleys are oriented south-southeast. The Ruisseau de Curmont is also a small right-hand tributary to the Isle; yet its course runs west-east and defines the boundary to Nantheuil in the south. This small stream is paralleled farther north by the Ruisseau de la Val(lade) merging with the Valouse as a right-hand tributary.

The topographically lowest point within the commune at an altitude of 178 meters is found at the confluence of the Ruisseau de Curmont with the Isle; at this point the Isle leaves the commune's territory and continues southwest. The highest point with 342 meters above sea level is close to the hamlet La Lande des Perrières northeast of the village center.

== Geology ==
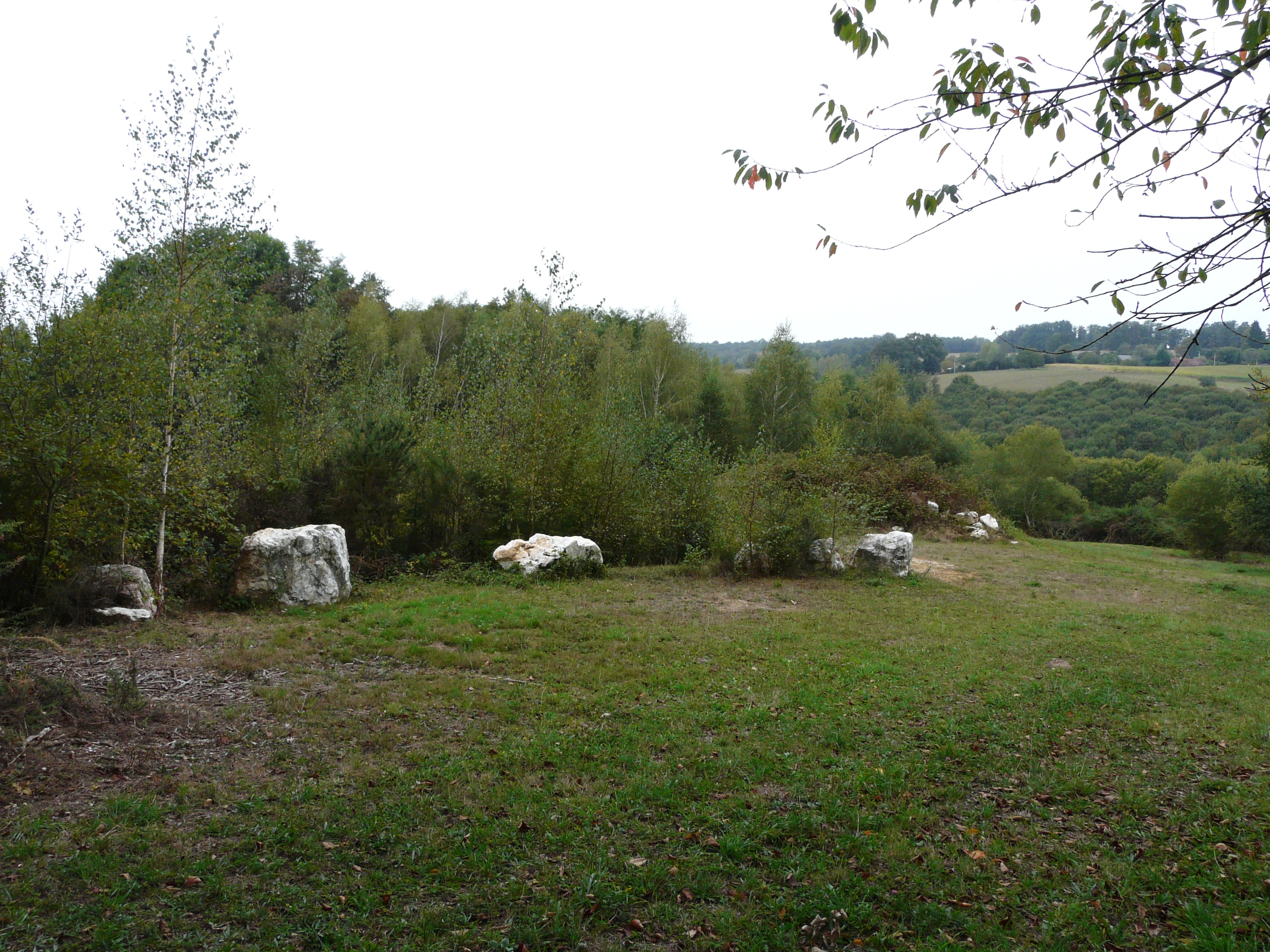
Left-over quartz slabs from the quarry La Roche Blanche

Saint-Paul-la-Roche is living up to its name by offering a very diverse and rather complicated geology. The commune is situated entirely on the metamorphic basement rocks of the northwestern Massif Central. Structurally these rocks belong to three different thrust sheets, the Lower Gneiss Nappe, the Upper Gneiss Nappe and at the southwest corner the Thiviers-Payzac Unit. The Lower Gneiss Nappe mainly comprises micaschists associated with micaceous paragneisses, paragneisses and medium-grained leptynites, the Upper Gneiss Nappe is mainly composed of paragneisses enclosing some leptynites. The medium-grained leptynites within the Lower Gneiss Nappe form an arc-shaped structure, the so-called Saint-Yrieix arc. The micaschists are derived from argilites, the paragneisses most probably from Neoproterozoic greywackes and the micaceous paragneisses from more clay-rich greywackes. The leptynites have a granitic composition and either represent granites or rhyolites; they are of Ordovician age, thus very much younger than the enclosing country rocks.

The Thiviers-Payzac Unit to the southwest consists of the Payzac Quartzite, a less metamorphosed equivalent of the rhyodacitic Thiviers Sandstone. The steeply dipping, ESE-striking rocks of the Thiviers-Payzac Unit upthrust obliquely over the Upper Gneiss Unit with a right-lateral shearing component. The Upper Gneiss Unit strikes southwest-northeast and in turn overrides The Lower Gneiss Unit to the northwest, also showing a SW-NE strike.

Enclosed within the micaschists are basic and ultrabasic rocks of the Roche Noire Massif (near the hamlet La Valade), mainly metagabbros and peridotites. These are some of the very few remnants of oceanic crust left behind from a now subducted ocean. The Massif also exhibits several tectonic lenses of serpentinised peridotites, amphibolites and a bigger serpentinite body. Within the micaschists and the micaceous paragneisses there are streaks of garnet-bearing amphibolites, which in some places also invade the paragneisses. Epidote-bearing amphibolites occur as well, they are found in micaceous paragneisses near the cemetery, in leptynites near Lintignac and in the Payzac Quartzite near Curmont. Even some small eclogite outcrops do exist, for instance three near Graffanaud along the Valouse and one near Combier at the Isle. There are also some small bands of dacitic metatuffs enclosed within the paragneisses, the micaceous paragneisses and in the Payzac Quartzite.

An oddity is the massive quartz outcrop near La Roche which has been completely quarried by now. This very pure, milky exsudation quartz was once sought after by NASA for optical devices (lenses etc.). Under magnification one can observe many parallel shear planes of tectonic origin. The quarry once contained single quartz crystals in the decimeter and meter range.

The metamorphic conditions of the country rocks reached medium and high grade. The Payzac Quartzite has crossed the staurolite isograd, the Upper Gneiss Unit belongs mainly to the staurolite zone and parts of the Lower Gneiss Unit even have reached the kyanite isograd (near the village center and in the north).

The country rocks are traversed by three major north-south-striking faults (north of Chalamant, in the village center and near Le Rouchou de la Forêt), which offset the stratigraphy. The faults at Chalamant and Le Rouchou de la Forêt are brecciated and cataclastic. The latter is a major fault, it even cuts off tectonic units (like the oceanic Sarrazac Massif from the Upper Gneiss Unit); it can be traced to Sarrazac in the south, in the north it splays out.

Some of the higher ridges are mantled by Tertiary alterites, which consist mainly of Pliocene fluvial gravels (tongues near La Lande de Beauplat, La Lande de Perrières, La Petite Lande and Le Pierrefiche) and colluvium. The colluvium underlies the gravel tongues and probably dates back to the Eocene, but was later reworked during the Pleistocene (ice ages).

== History ==
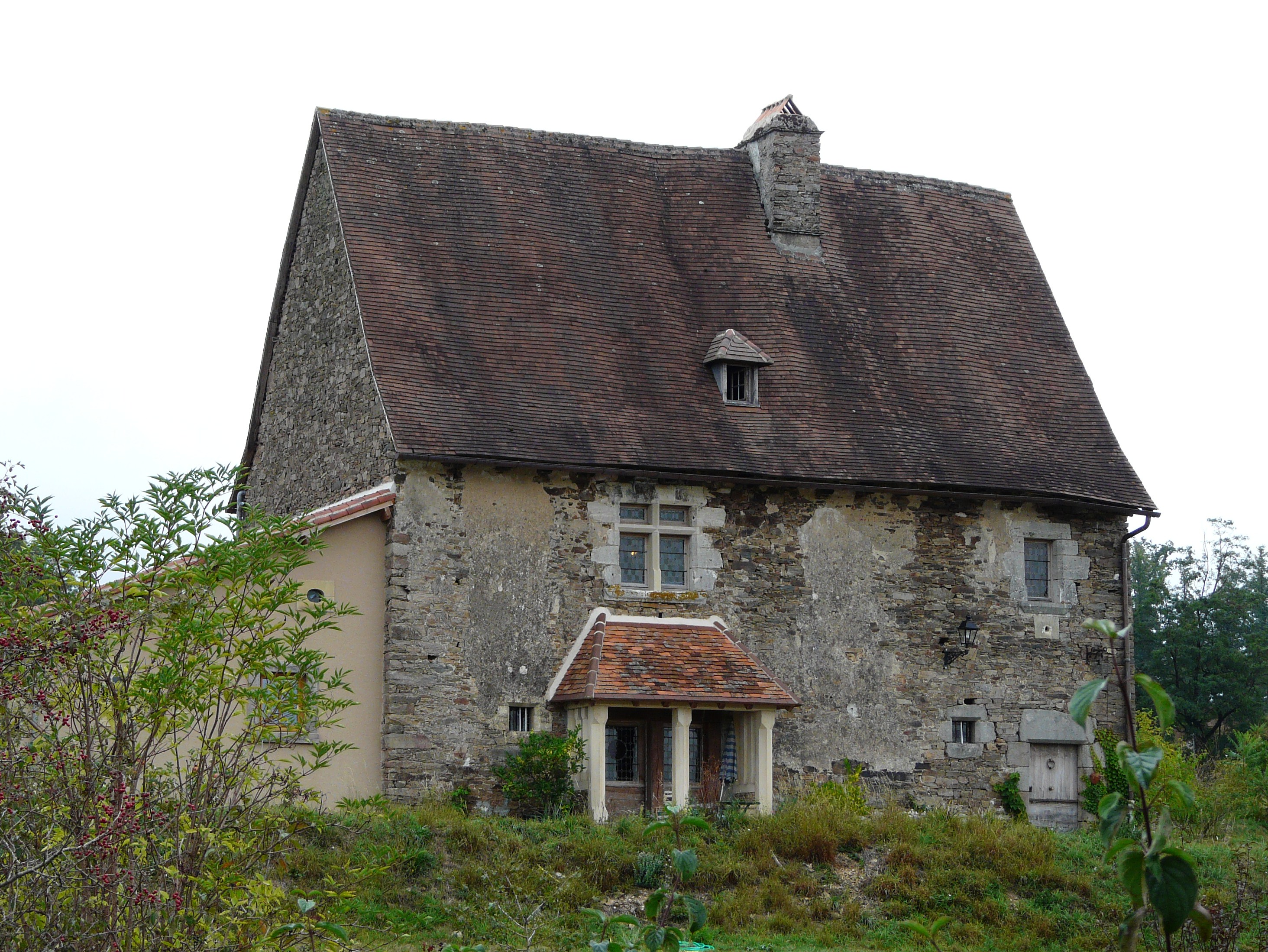
The ancient abode of the Knights Templar

The Château de Chalard is mentioned for the first time in the 11th century. Most of it was destroyed during the Hundred Years War. The Romanesque village church of Saint-Paul-la-Roche dates back to the 12th century. The Château de Montardy was built during the 15th century on a site occupied before by a Knights Templar stronghold.

== Population ==
Historical population
Year	Pop.	±% p.a.
1968	794	—
1975	616	−3.56%
1982	591	−0.59%
1990	555	−0.78%
1999	551	−0.08%
2007	520	−0.72%
2012	527	+0.27%
2017	525	−0.08%
2023	542	+0.53%
Source: INSEE

== Sights ==
- The Romanesque village church.
- The castle Château de Chalard.
- The castle Château de Montardy.
- La maison templière, an ancient dwelling of the Knights Templar.

== Access ==
Close to the western boundary of the commune passes the major trunk road N 21 from Limoges to Périgueux. It is paralleled by the railway line Limoges – Thiviers. The southeastern and southern border is followed by the D 78 from Jumilhac-le-Grand to Thiviers. The D 67 comes from La Coquille, crosses the village center and continues to Sarrazac in the SSE. Several communal roads (C roads) join the village center with its many hamlets.

== See also ==
- Communes of the Dordogne department

== Literature ==
- Guillot, P.-L. et al. Feuille Thiviers. Carte géologique de la France à 1/50000. BRGM.
- Richard, D. et al. (1993). Le Guide Dordogne Périgord. Éditions Fanlac. Périgueux.
