= Sorges =

Commune in Dordogne, France

- Part of Sorges et Ligueux en Périgord
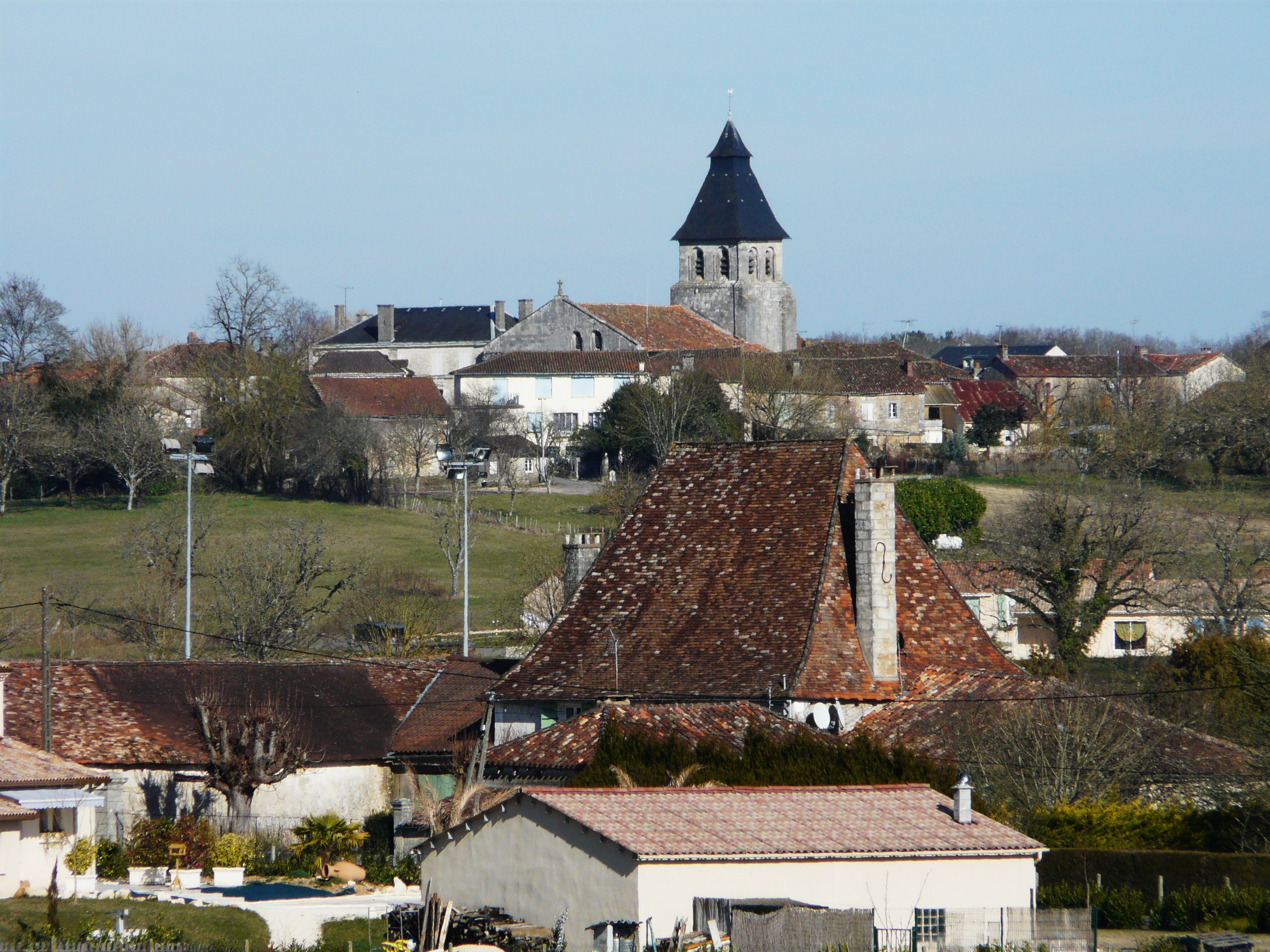
- Location of Sorges
- Location within France Location within Nouvelle-Aquitaine
- Coordinates: 45°18′31″N 0°52′27″E
- Country: France
- Region: Nouvelle-Aquitaine
- Department: Dordogne
- Arrondissement: Périgueux
- Canton: Thiviers
- Commune: Sorges et Ligueux en Périgord
- Area^{1}: 47.38 km^{2} (18.29 sq mi)
- Highest elevation: 216 m (709 ft)
- Lowest elevation: 120 m (390 ft)
- Population (2022): 1,335
  - Density: 28.18/km^{2} (72.98/sq mi)
- Time zone: UTC+01:00 (CET)
  - Summer (DST): UTC+02:00 (CEST)
- Postal code: 24420
- ^{1} French Land Register data, which excludes lakes, ponds, glaciers > 1 km^{2} (0.386 sq mi or 247 acres) and river estuaries.

Sorges (French pronunciation: [sɔʁʒ]; Occitan: Sòrges) is a former commune in the Dordogne department in southwestern France. On 1 January 2016, it was merged into the new commune Sorges et Ligueux en Périgord.

== Population ==
Historical population

Year	Pop.	±% p.a.
1793	1,473	—
1800	1,328	−1.47%
1806	1,367	+0.48%
1821	1,684	+1.40%
1831	1,764	+0.47%
1836	1,873	+1.21%
1841	1,756	−1.28%
1846	1,864	+1.20%
1851	1,844	−0.22%
1856	1,930	+0.92%
1861	1,873	−0.60%
1866	1,895	+0.23%
1872	1,803	−0.83%
1876	1,890	+1.19%
1881	1,790	−1.08%
1886	1,773	−0.19%
1891	1,715	−0.66%
1896	1,679	−0.42%

Year	Pop.	±% p.a.
1901	1,688	+0.11%
1906	1,663	−0.30%
1911	1,664	+0.01%
1921	1,377	−1.88%
1926	1,365	−0.17%
1931	1,316	−0.73%
1936	1,269	−0.72%
1946	1,104	−1.38%
1954	1,158	+0.60%
1962	980	−2.06%
1968	892	−1.56%
1975	876	−0.26%
1982	911	+0.56%
1990	1,074	+2.08%
1999	1,123	+0.50%
2006	1,157	+0.43%
2022	1,335	+0.90%

Source: EHESS and INSEE

== See also ==
- Communes of the Dordogne département
