= Ligueux =

Ligueux is the name of several communes in France:

- Ligueux, Dordogne, in the Dordogne department
- Ligueux, Gironde, in the Gironde department
