= La Coquille station =

Railway station in La Coquille, France

Coordinates: 45°32′26″N 0°58′28″E

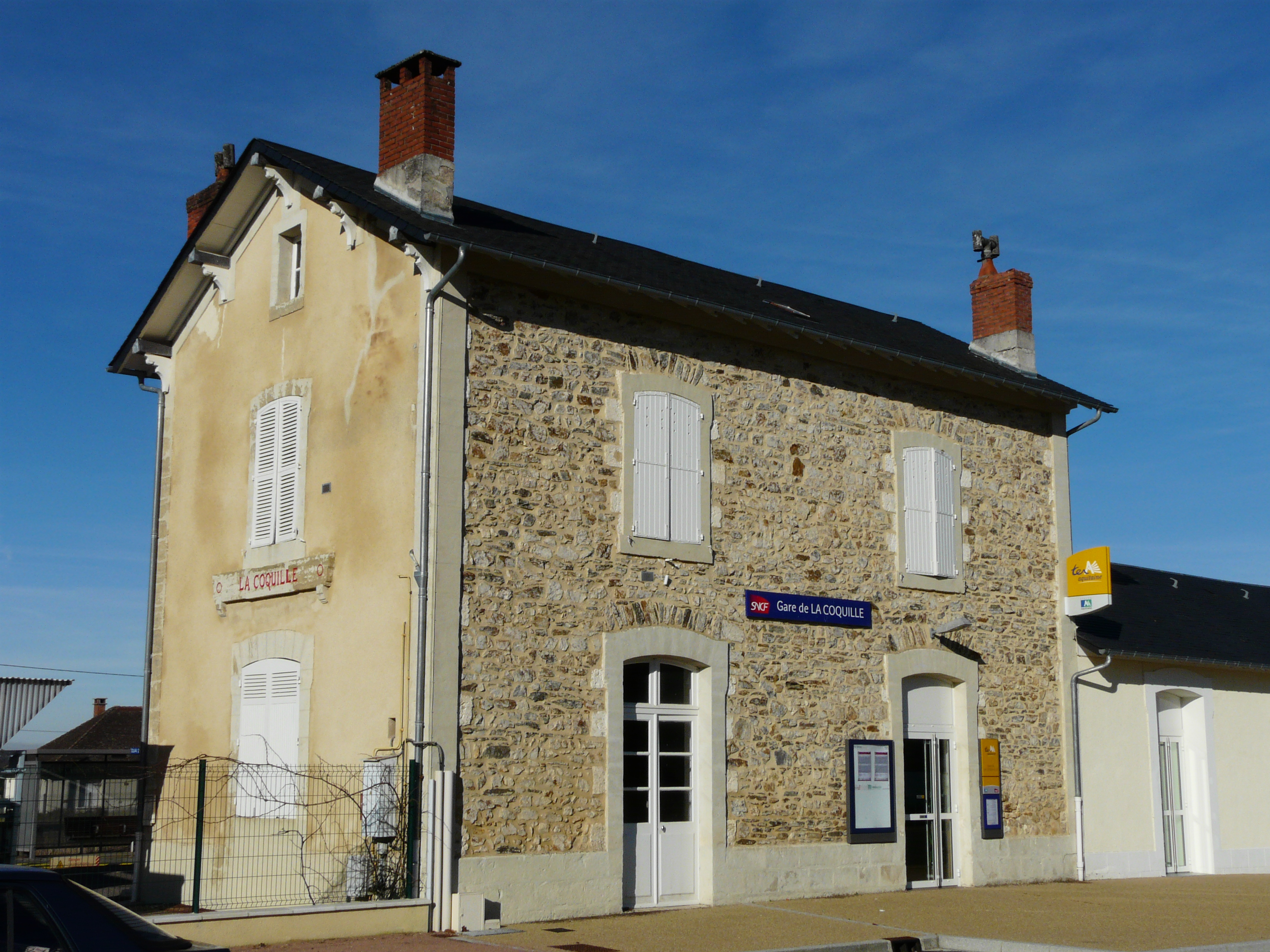
Station buildings

La Coquille is a railway station in La Coquille, Nouvelle-Aquitaine, France. The station is located on the Limoges-Bénédictins - Périgueux railway line. The station is served by TER (local) services operated by SNCF.

== Train services ==
The following services currently call at La Coquille:

- local service (TER Nouvelle-Aquitaine) Limoges - Thiviers - Périgueux - Bordeaux

Preceding station	TER Nouvelle-Aquitaine	Following station
Thiviers towards Bordeaux	31	Bussière-Galant towards Limoges
