= Négrondes =

- Commune
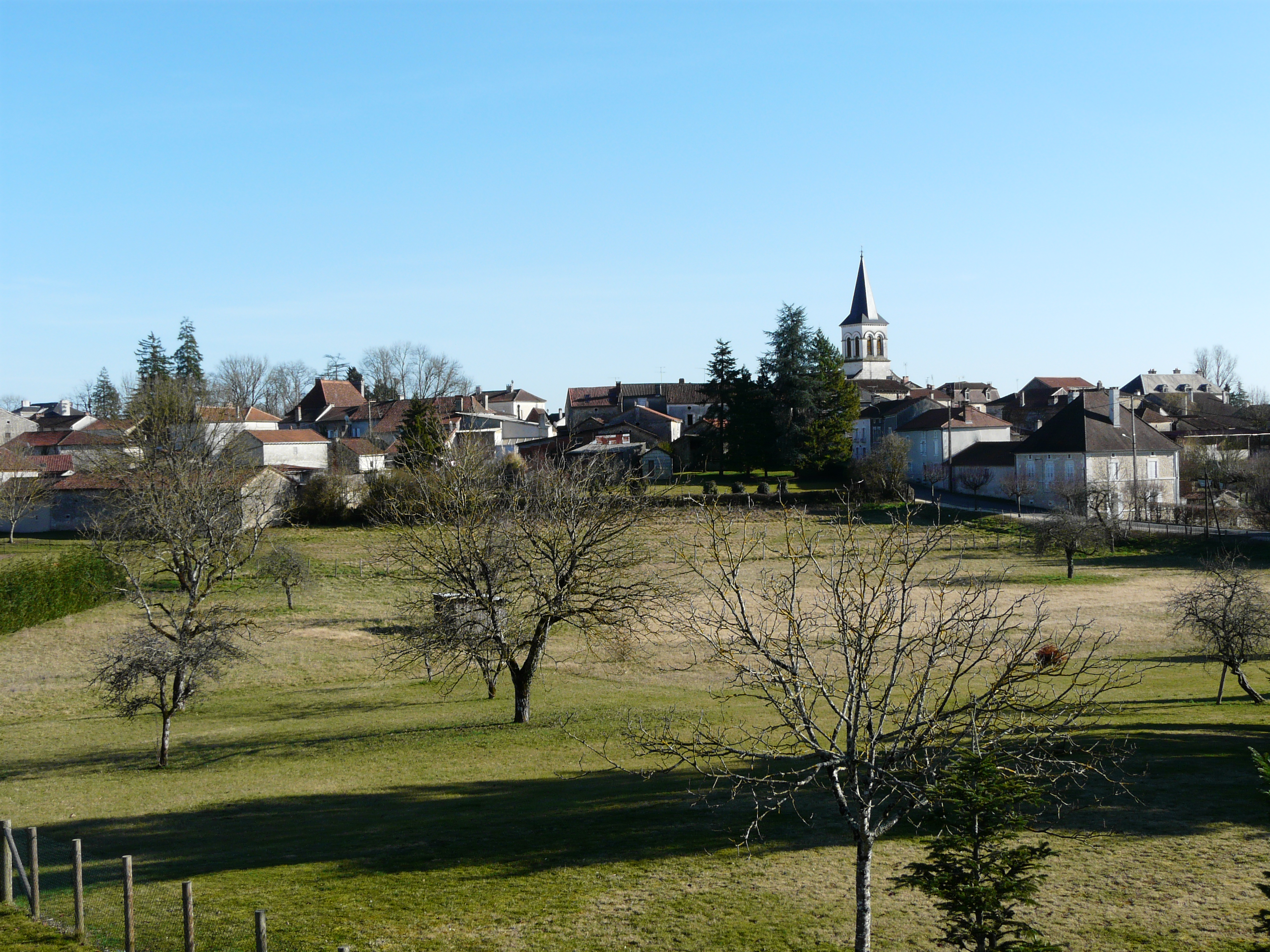
- A general view of Négrondes

- Coat of arms
- Location of Négrondes
- Location within France Location within Nouvelle-Aquitaine
- Coordinates: 45°20′43″N 0°51′54″E
- Country: France
- Region: Nouvelle-Aquitaine
- Department: Dordogne
- Arrondissement: Nontron
- Canton: Thiviers

Government
  - Mayor (2020–2026): Françoise Decarpentrie
- Area^{1}: 20.15 km^{2} (7.78 sq mi)
- Elevation: 174 m (571 ft)
- Highest elevation: 232 m (761 ft)
- Lowest elevation: 155 m (509 ft)
- Population (2023): 778
  - Density: 38.6/km^{2} (100/sq mi)
- Time zone: UTC+01:00 (CET)
  - Summer (DST): UTC+02:00 (CEST)
- INSEE/Postal code: 24308 /24460
- ^{1} French Land Register data, which excludes lakes, ponds, glaciers > 1 km^{2} (0.386 sq mi or 247 acres) and river estuaries.

Négrondes (French pronunciation: [neɡʁɔ̃d]; Occitan: Negrondes) is a commune in the Dordogne department in Nouvelle-Aquitaine in southwestern France. Négrondes station has rail connections to Bordeaux, Périgueux and Limoges.

== Population ==
Historical population
| Year | Pop. | ±% p.a. |
|---|---|---|
| 1968 | 603 | — |
| 1975 | 565 | −0.93% |
| 1982 | 578 | +0.33% |
| 1990 | 664 | +1.75% |
| 1999 | 659 | −0.08% |
| 2007 | 799 | +2.44% |
| 2012 | 835 | +0.89% |
| 2017 | 815 | −0.48% |
| 2023 | 778 | −0.77% |
Source: INSEE

== See also ==
- Communes of the Dordogne department
