= Lafarge station =

Railway station in Saint-Hilaire-les-Places, France

Coordinates: 45°36′28″N 1°01′33″E

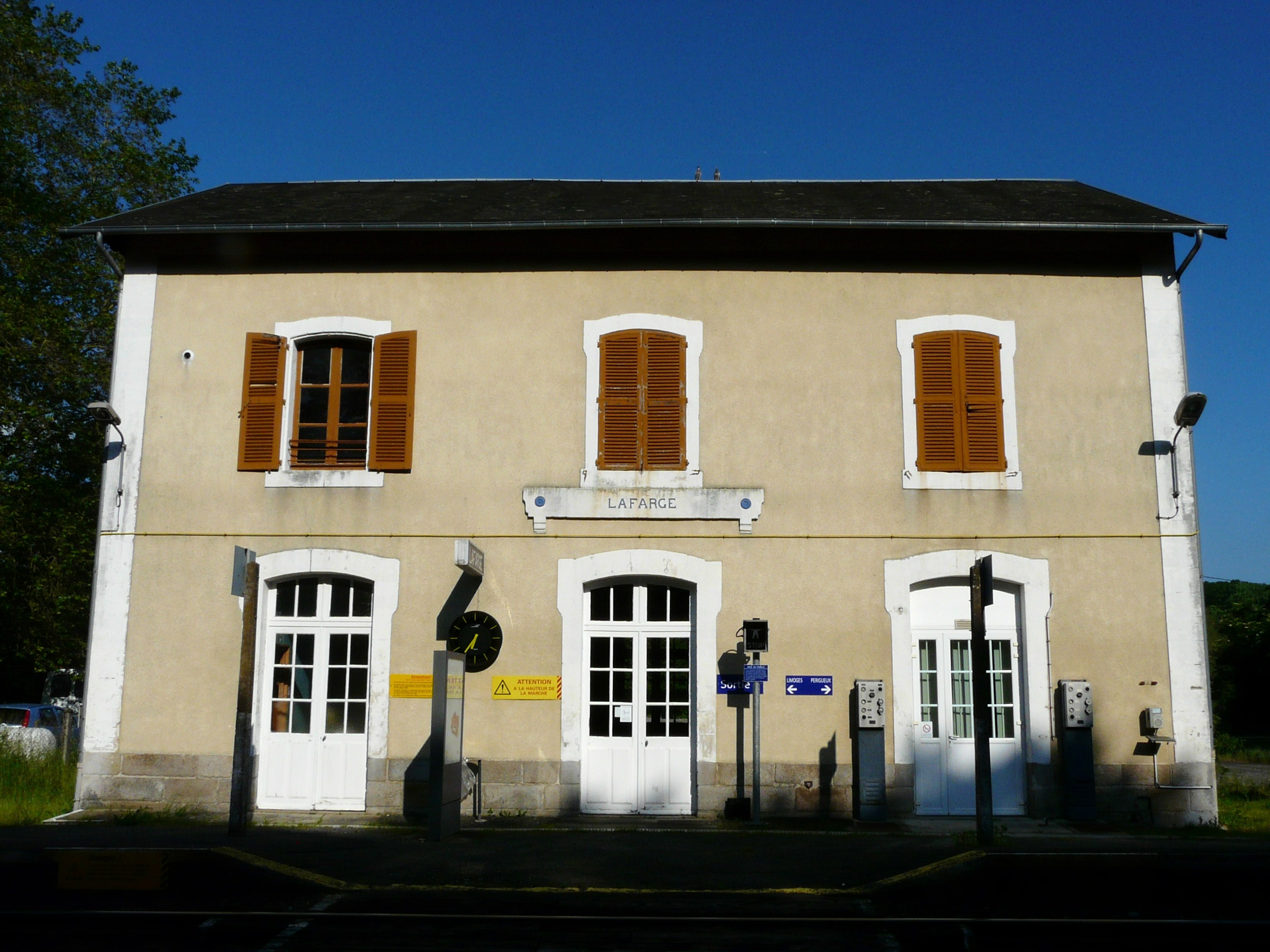
Lafarge station

Lafarge is a railway station in Lafarge, Nouvelle-Aquitaine, France. The station is located on the Limoges-Bénédictins - Périgueux railway line. The station is served by TER (local) services operated by SNCF.

The station is primarily for Saint-Hilaire-les-Places, 2 km away.

== Train services ==
The following services currently call at Lafarge:

- local service (TER Nouvelle-Aquitaine) Limoges - Thiviers - Périgueux - Bordeaux

Preceding station	TER Nouvelle-Aquitaine	Following station
Bussière-Galant towards Bordeaux	31	Nexon towards Limoges
