= Arboretum des Pouyouleix =

Arboretum in Dordogne, Aquitaine, France

Coordinates: 45.47307°N 0.88922°E

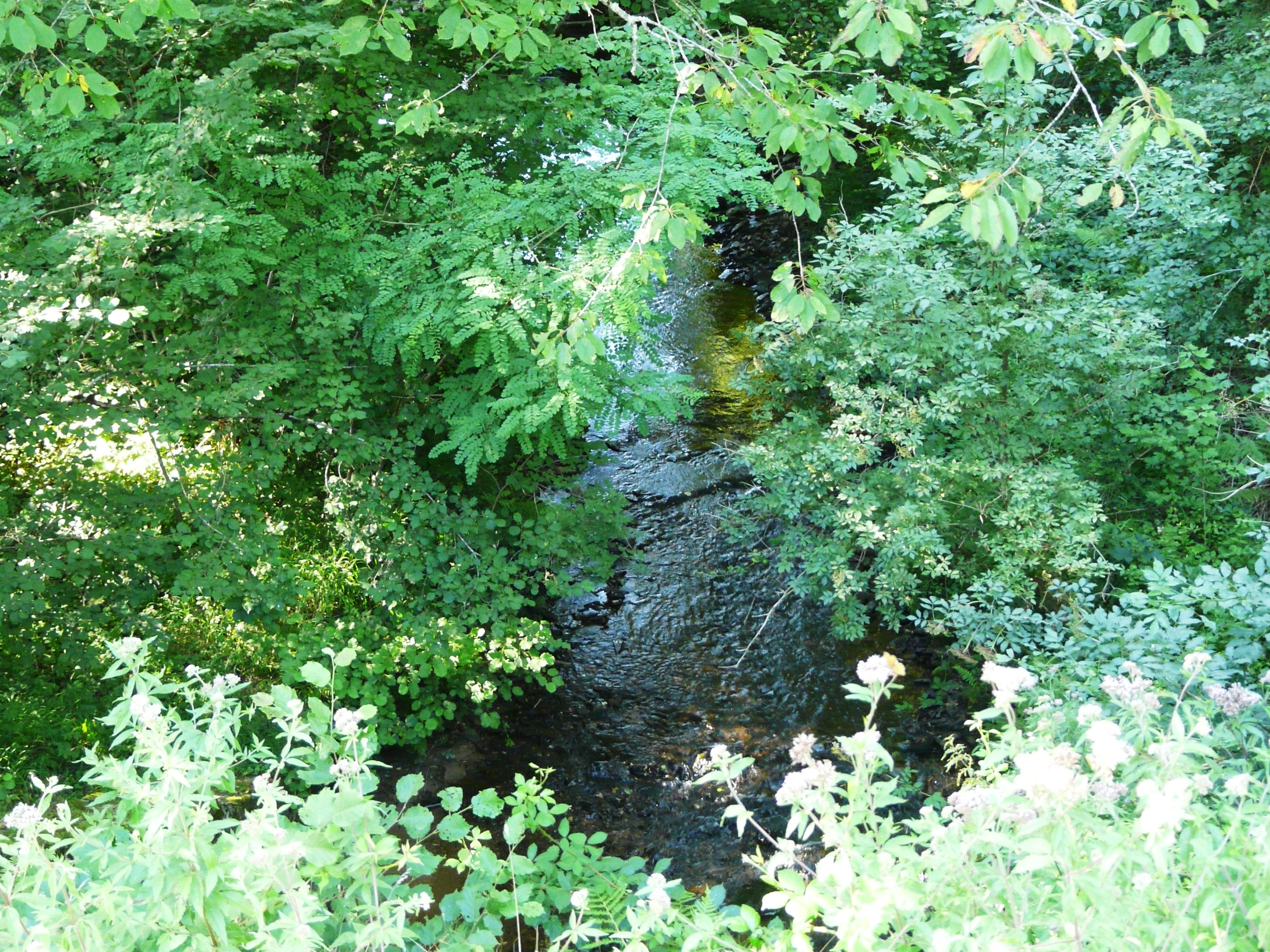
Private collection of Oak tree at Touroulet Saint-Jory-de-Chalais Javanaud

The Arboretum des Pouyouleix is a private arboretum specializing in oaks (Quercus) located in Saint-Jory-de-Chalais, Dordogne, Aquitaine, France, and open by appointment only. The arboretum was established on a 60-acre (240,000 m^{2}) site by Beatrice Chasse and Gerard Lionet in 2003. The arboretum received National Collection status for the genus Quercus in 2012. Today the collection comprises nearly 300 botanic species of oak, and is said to be one of the largest oak collections in France.

== See also ==
- List of botanical gardens in France
