= Vaunac =

- Commune
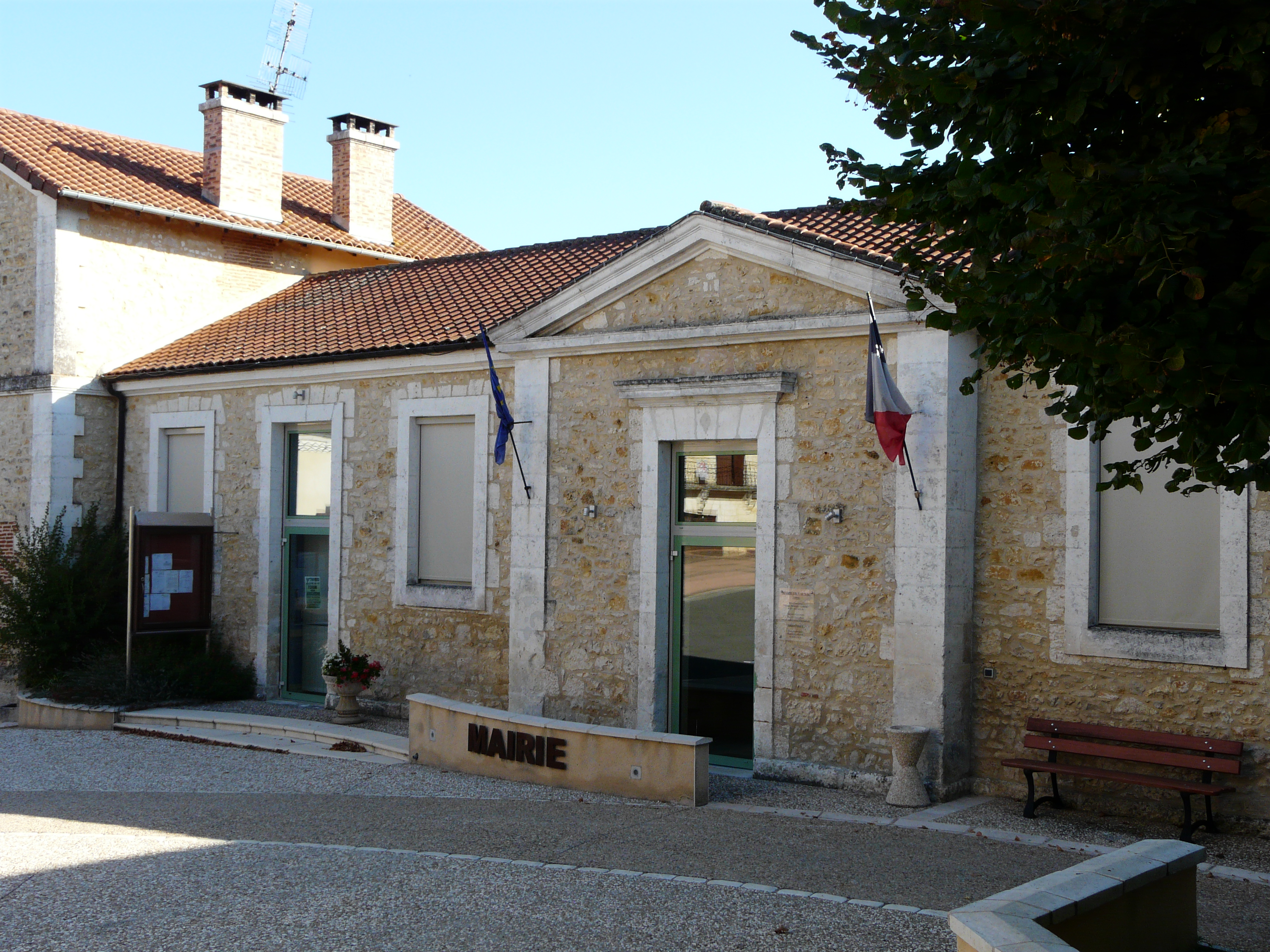
- The town hall in Vaunac
- Location of Vaunac
- Location within France Location within Nouvelle-Aquitaine
- Coordinates: 45°21′54″N 0°51′54″E
- Country: France
- Region: Nouvelle-Aquitaine
- Department: Dordogne
- Arrondissement: Nontron
- Canton: Thiviers

Government
  - Mayor (2020–2026): Jean-Claude Juge
- Area^{1}: 13.78 km^{2} (5.32 sq mi)
- Elevation: 228 m (748 ft)
- Highest elevation: 242 m (794 ft)
- Lowest elevation: 156 m (512 ft)
- Population (2023): 247
  - Density: 17.9/km^{2} (46.4/sq mi)
- Time zone: UTC+01:00 (CET)
  - Summer (DST): UTC+02:00 (CEST)
- INSEE/Postal code: 24567 /24800
- ^{1} French Land Register data, which excludes lakes, ponds, glaciers > 1 km^{2} (0.386 sq mi or 247 acres) and river estuaries.

Vaunac (French pronunciation: [vonak]; Occitan: Veunac) is a commune in the Dordogne department in Nouvelle-Aquitaine in southwestern France.

== Population ==
Historical population
Year	Pop.	±% p.a.
1968	235	—
1975	229	−0.37%
1982	210	−1.23%
1990	230	+1.14%
1999	230	+0.00%
2007	248	+0.95%
2012	268	+1.56%
2017	273	+0.37%
2023	247	−1.65%
Source: INSEE

== See also ==
- Communes of the Dordogne department
