= Saint-Martin-de-Fressengeas =

- Commune
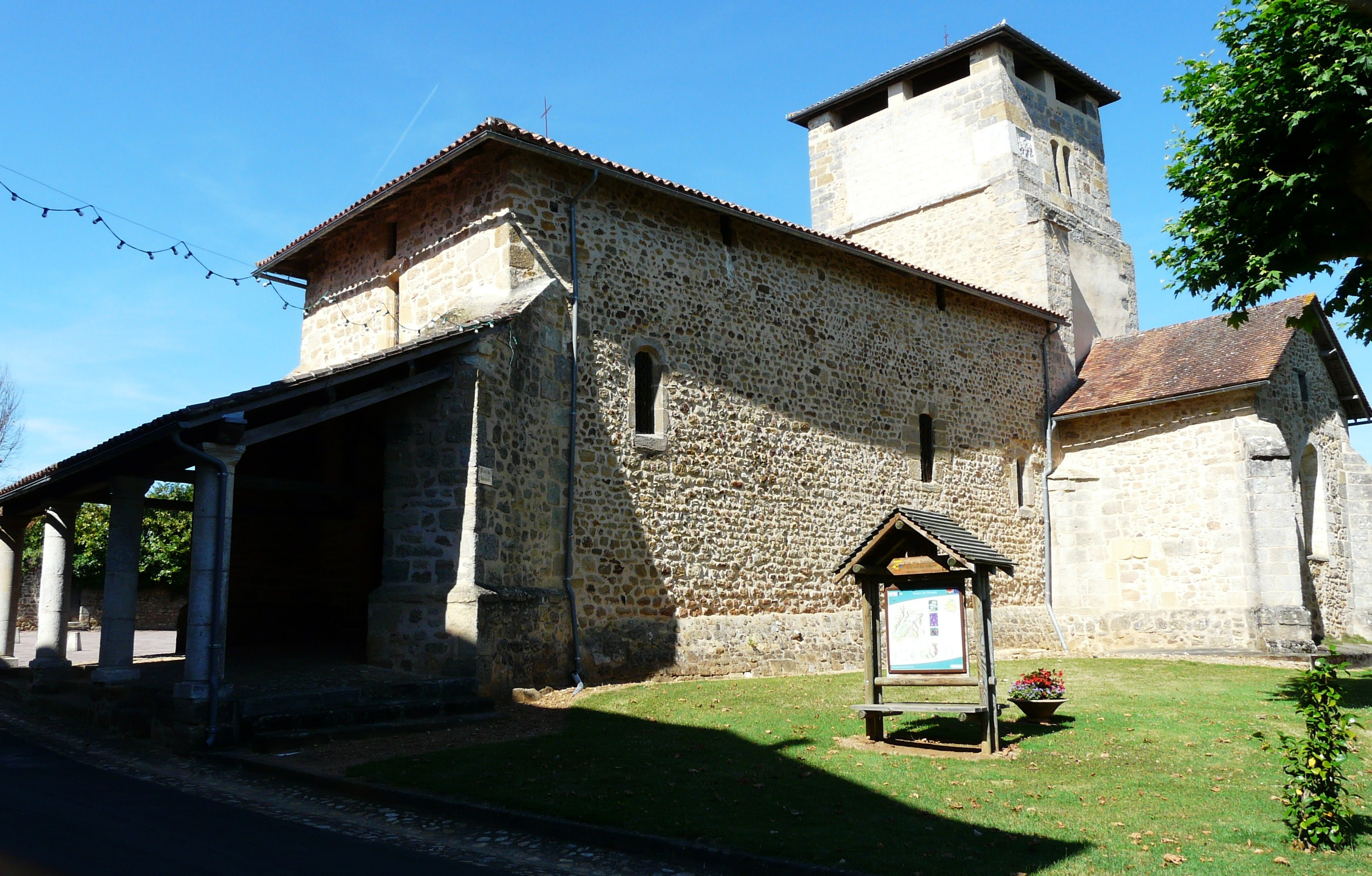
- The church in Saint-Martin-de-Fressengeas
- Location of Saint-Martin-de-Fressengeas
- Location within France Location within Nouvelle-Aquitaine
- Coordinates: 45°26′40″N 0°50′44″E
- Country: France
- Region: Nouvelle-Aquitaine
- Department: Dordogne
- Arrondissement: Nontron
- Canton: Thiviers

Government
  - Mayor (2020–2026): Michel Augeix
- Area^{1}: 20.84 km^{2} (8.05 sq mi)
- Elevation: 259 m (850 ft)
- Highest elevation: 302 m (991 ft)
- Lowest elevation: 148 m (486 ft)
- Population (2023): 361
  - Density: 17.3/km^{2} (44.9/sq mi)
- Time zone: UTC+01:00 (CET)
  - Summer (DST): UTC+02:00 (CEST)
- INSEE/Postal code: 24453 /24800
- ^{1} French Land Register data, which excludes lakes, ponds, glaciers > 1 km^{2} (0.386 sq mi or 247 acres) and river estuaries.

Saint-Martin-de-Fressengeas (Limousin: Sent Martin de Fraissenjas) is a commune in the Dordogne department in Nouvelle-Aquitaine in southwestern France.

== Population ==
Historical population
Year	Pop.	±% p.a.
1968	428	—
1975	394	−1.18%
1982	390	−0.15%
1990	394	+0.13%
1999	375	−0.55%
2007	380	+0.17%
2012	368	−0.64%
2017	359	−0.49%
2023	361	+0.09%
Source: INSEE

== See also ==
- Communes of the Dordogne department
