= Saint-Front-d'Alemps =

- Commune
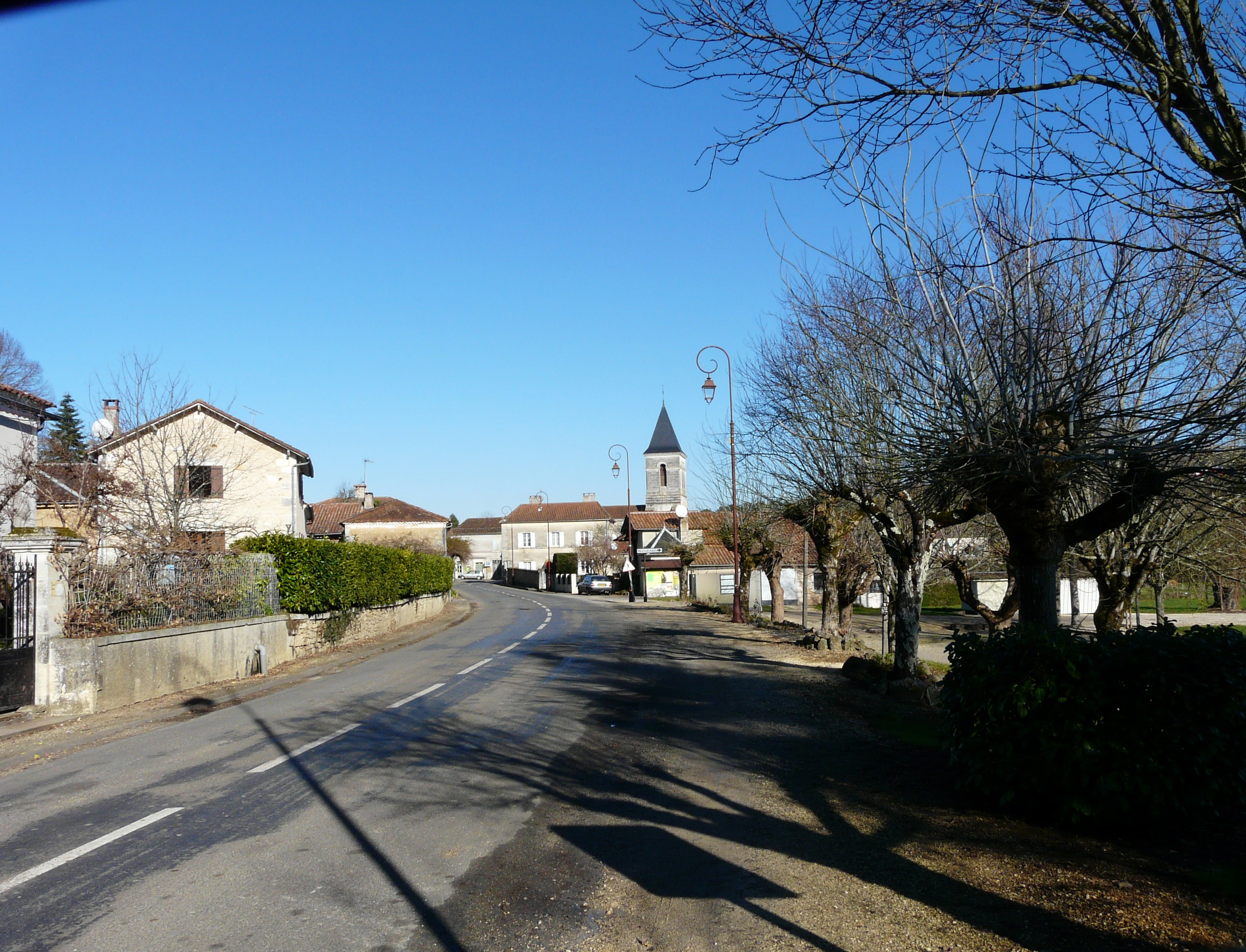
- A general view of Saint-Front-d'Alemps
- Location of Saint-Front-d'Alemps
- Location within France Location within Nouvelle-Aquitaine
- Coordinates: 45°19′32″N 0°46′55″E
- Country: France
- Region: Nouvelle-Aquitaine
- Department: Dordogne
- Arrondissement: Nontron
- Canton: Thiviers

Government
  - Mayor (2020–2026): Frédéric Dessolas
- Area^{1}: 19.02 km^{2} (7.34 sq mi)
- Highest elevation: 221 m (725 ft)
- Lowest elevation: 128 m (420 ft)
- Population (2023): 252
  - Density: 13.2/km^{2} (34.3/sq mi)
- Time zone: UTC+01:00 (CET)
  - Summer (DST): UTC+02:00 (CEST)
- INSEE/Postal code: 24408 /24460
- ^{1} French Land Register data, which excludes lakes, ponds, glaciers > 1 km^{2} (0.386 sq mi or 247 acres) and river estuaries.

Saint-Front-d'Alemps (Occitan: Sant Testa d'Alemps) is a commune in the Dordogne department in Nouvelle-Aquitaine in southwestern France.

== Population ==
Historical population
Year	Pop.	±% p.a.
1968	306	—
1975	269	−1.82%
1982	267	−0.11%
1990	285	+0.82%
1999	266	−0.76%
2007	272	+0.28%
2012	257	−1.13%
2017	262	+0.39%
2023	252	−0.65%
Source: INSEE

== See also ==
- Communes of the Dordogne department
