= Saint-Hilaire-les-Places =

- Commune
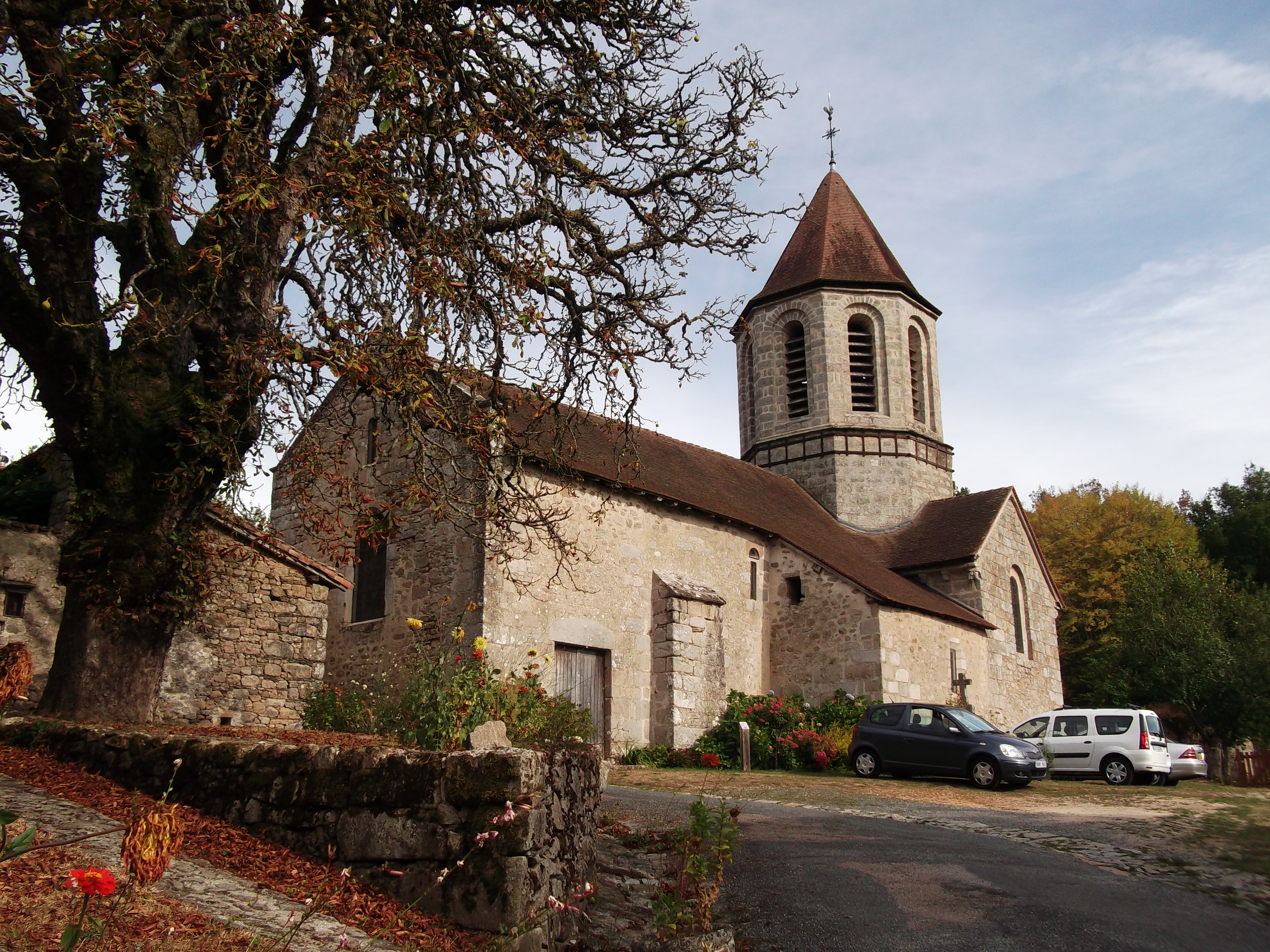
- The church of Saint-Hilaire, in Saint-Hilaire-les-Places

- Coat of arms
- Location of Saint-Hilaire-les-Places
- Location within France Location within Nouvelle-Aquitaine
- Coordinates: 45°38′45″N 1°09′35″E
- Country: France
- Region: Nouvelle-Aquitaine
- Department: Haute-Vienne
- Arrondissement: Limoges
- Canton: Saint-Yrieix-la-Perche

Government
  - Mayor (2020–2026): Sylvie Vallade
- Area^{1}: 23.06 km^{2} (8.90 sq mi)
- Highest elevation: 492 m (1,614 ft)
- Lowest elevation: 320 m (1,050 ft)
- Population (2023): 839
  - Density: 36.4/km^{2} (94.2/sq mi)
- Time zone: UTC+01:00 (CET)
  - Summer (DST): UTC+02:00 (CEST)
- INSEE/Postal code: 87150 /87800
- ^{1} French Land Register data, which excludes lakes, ponds, glaciers > 1 km^{2} (0.386 sq mi or 247 acres) and river estuaries.

Saint-Hilaire-les-Places (French pronunciation: [sɛ̃.t‿ilɛʁ le plas]; Occitan: Sent Alari las Plaças) is a commune in the Haute-Vienne department in the Nouvelle-Aquitaine region in west-central France. Lafarge station has rail connections to Bordeaux, Périgueux and Limoges.

== See also ==
- Communes of the Haute-Vienne department
