= Corgnac-sur-l'Isle =

- Commune
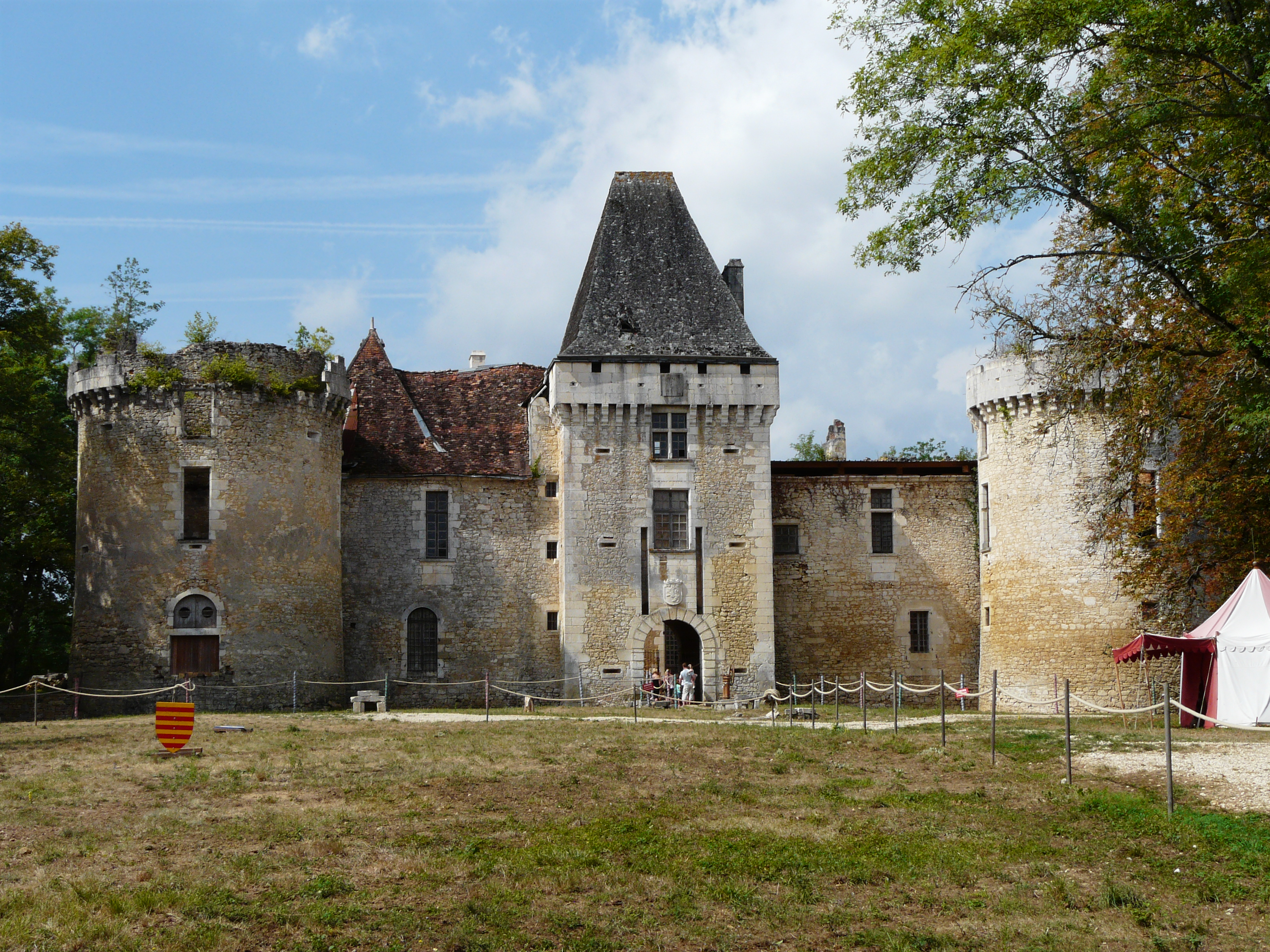
- Chateau of Laxion
- Location of Corgnac-sur-l'Isle
- Location within France Location within Nouvelle-Aquitaine
- Coordinates: 45°22′38″N 0°56′55″E
- Country: France
- Region: Nouvelle-Aquitaine
- Department: Dordogne
- Arrondissement: Nontron
- Canton: Thiviers

Government
  - Mayor (2020–2026): Philippe Gimenez
- Area^{1}: 20.61 km^{2} (7.96 sq mi)
- Elevation: 145 m (476 ft)
- Highest elevation: 255 m (837 ft)
- Lowest elevation: 128 m (420 ft)
- Population (2023): 854
  - Density: 41.4/km^{2} (107/sq mi)
- Time zone: UTC+01:00 (CET)
  - Summer (DST): UTC+02:00 (CEST)
- INSEE/Postal code: 24134 /24800
- ^{1} French Land Register data, which excludes lakes, ponds, glaciers > 1 km^{2} (0.386 sq mi or 247 acres) and river estuaries.

Corgnac-sur-l'Isle (Occitan: Corgnac sus l'Eila) is a commune in the Dordogne department in Nouvelle-Aquitaine in southwestern France.

== Population ==
Historical population
Year	Pop.	±% p.a.
1968	1,021	—
1975	957	−0.92%
1982	866	−1.42%
1990	888	+0.31%
1999	840	−0.62%
2007	800	−0.61%
2012	796	−0.10%
2017	835	+0.96%
2023	854	+0.38%
Source: INSEE

== See also ==
- Communes of the Dordogne department
