= Eyzerac =

- Commune
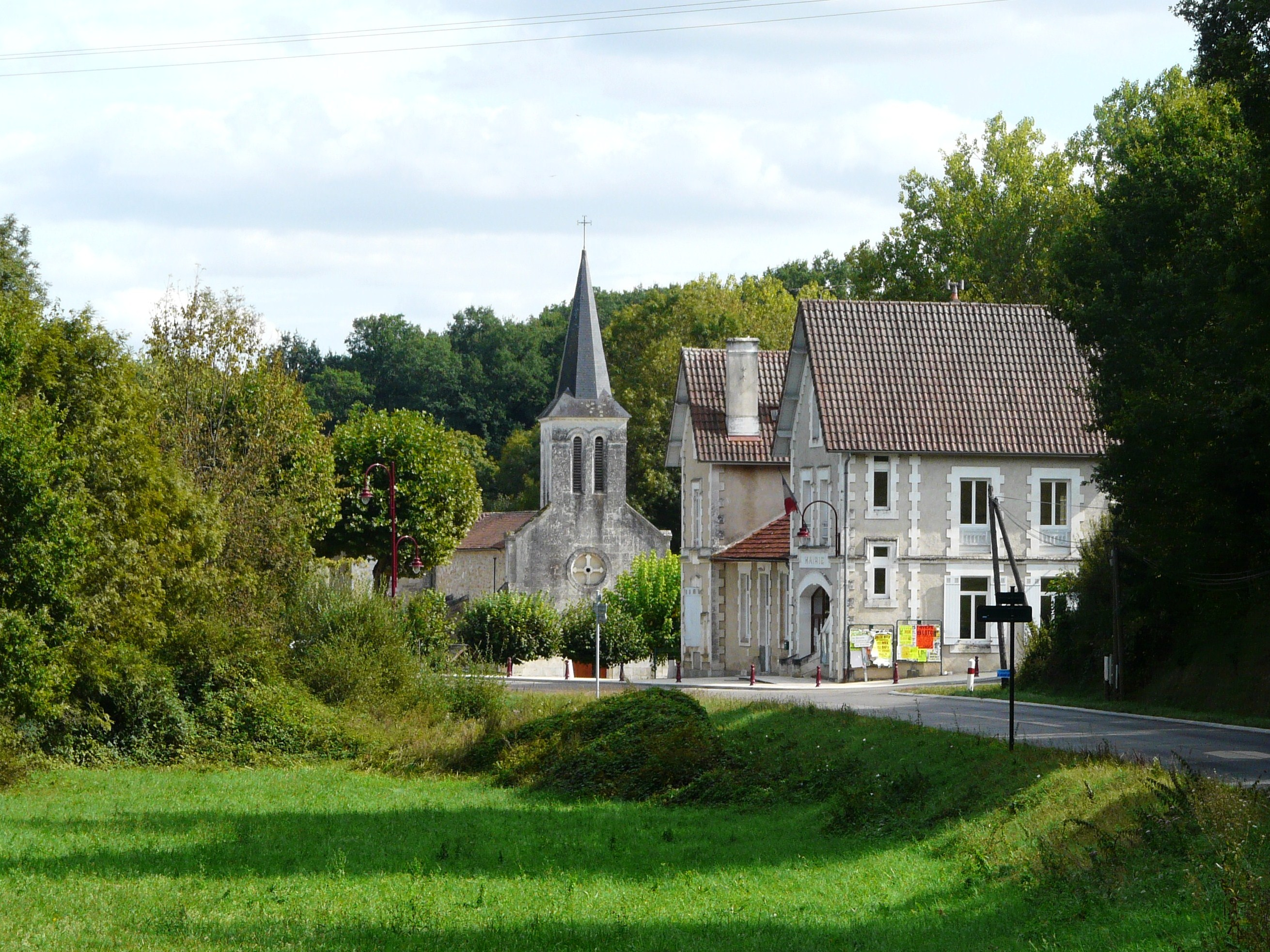
- The town hall and church in Eyzerac
- Location of Eyzerac
- Location within France Location within Nouvelle-Aquitaine
- Coordinates: 45°23′23″N 0°55′18″E
- Country: France
- Region: Nouvelle-Aquitaine
- Department: Dordogne
- Arrondissement: Nontron
- Canton: Thiviers

Government
  - Mayor (2020–2026): Claude Bost
- Area^{1}: 11.03 km^{2} (4.26 sq mi)
- Elevation: 176 m (577 ft)
- Highest elevation: 260 m (850 ft)
- Lowest elevation: 149 m (489 ft)
- Population (2023): 541
  - Density: 49.0/km^{2} (127/sq mi)
- Time zone: UTC+01:00 (CET)
  - Summer (DST): UTC+02:00 (CEST)
- INSEE/Postal code: 24171 /24800
- ^{1} French Land Register data, which excludes lakes, ponds, glaciers > 1 km^{2} (0.386 sq mi or 247 acres) and river estuaries.

Eyzerac is a commune in the Dordogne department in Nouvelle-Aquitaine in southwestern France.

== Population ==
Historical population
Year	Pop.	±% p.a.
1968	432	—
1975	422	−0.33%
1982	430	+0.27%
1990	493	+1.72%
1999	510	+0.38%
2007	562	+1.22%
2012	564	+0.07%
2017	560	−0.14%
2023	541	−0.57%
Source: INSEE

== See also ==
- Communes of the Dordogne department
