= Négrondes station =

Railway station in Négrondes, France

Coordinates: 45°20′45″N 0°51′40″E

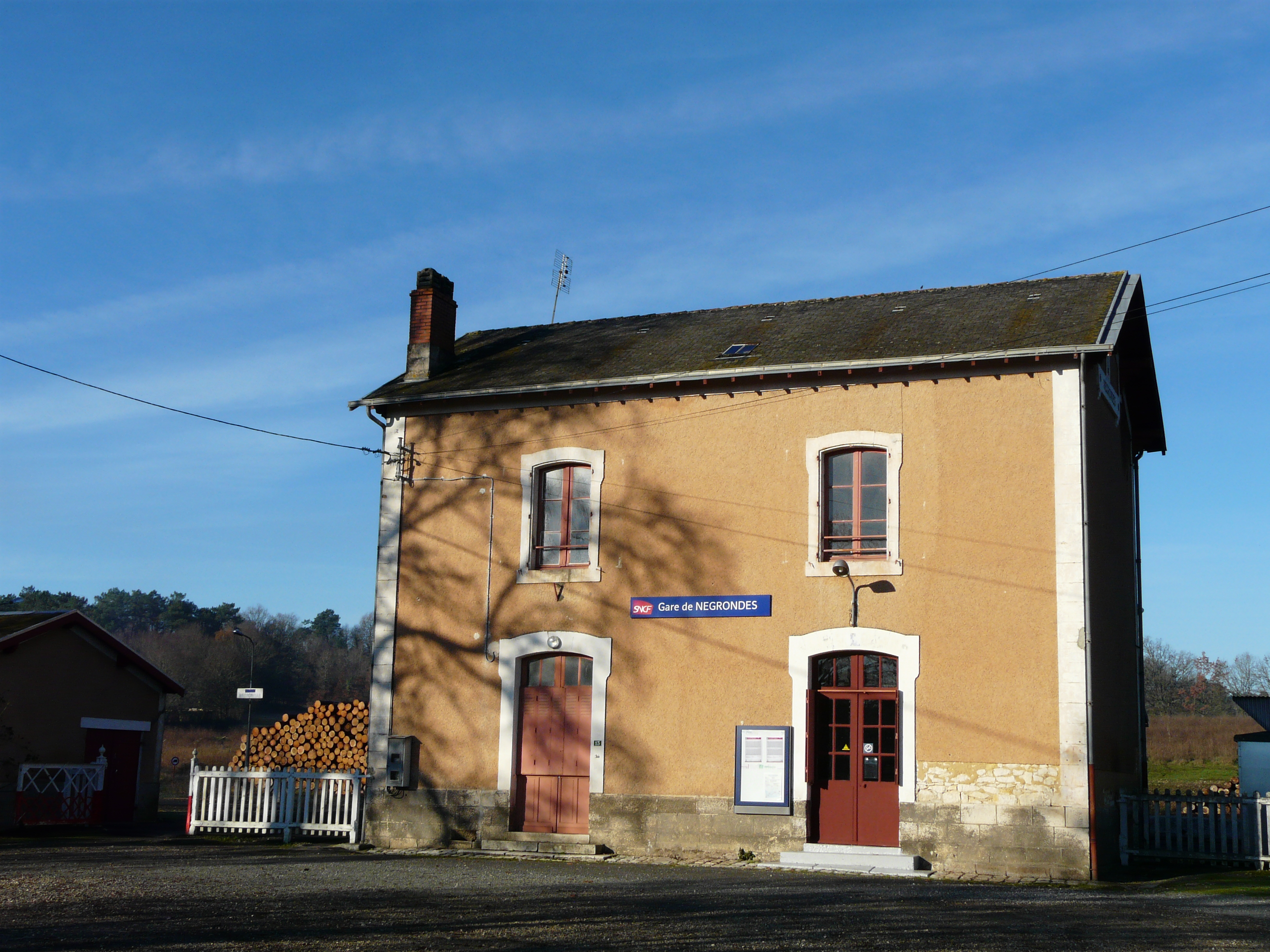
Négrondes station

Négrondes is a railway station in Négrondes, Nouvelle-Aquitaine, France. The station is located on the Limoges-Bénédictins - Périgueux railway line. The station is served by TER (local) services operated by SNCF.

== Train services ==
The following services currently call at Négrondes:

- local service (TER Nouvelle-Aquitaine) Limoges - Thiviers - Périgueux

Preceding station	TER Nouvelle-Aquitaine	Following station
Agonac towards Bordeaux	31	Thiviers towards Limoges
