= Château de Vaucocour =

Château in Nouvelle-Aquitaine, France

Coordinates: 45°24′52″N 0°55′19″E

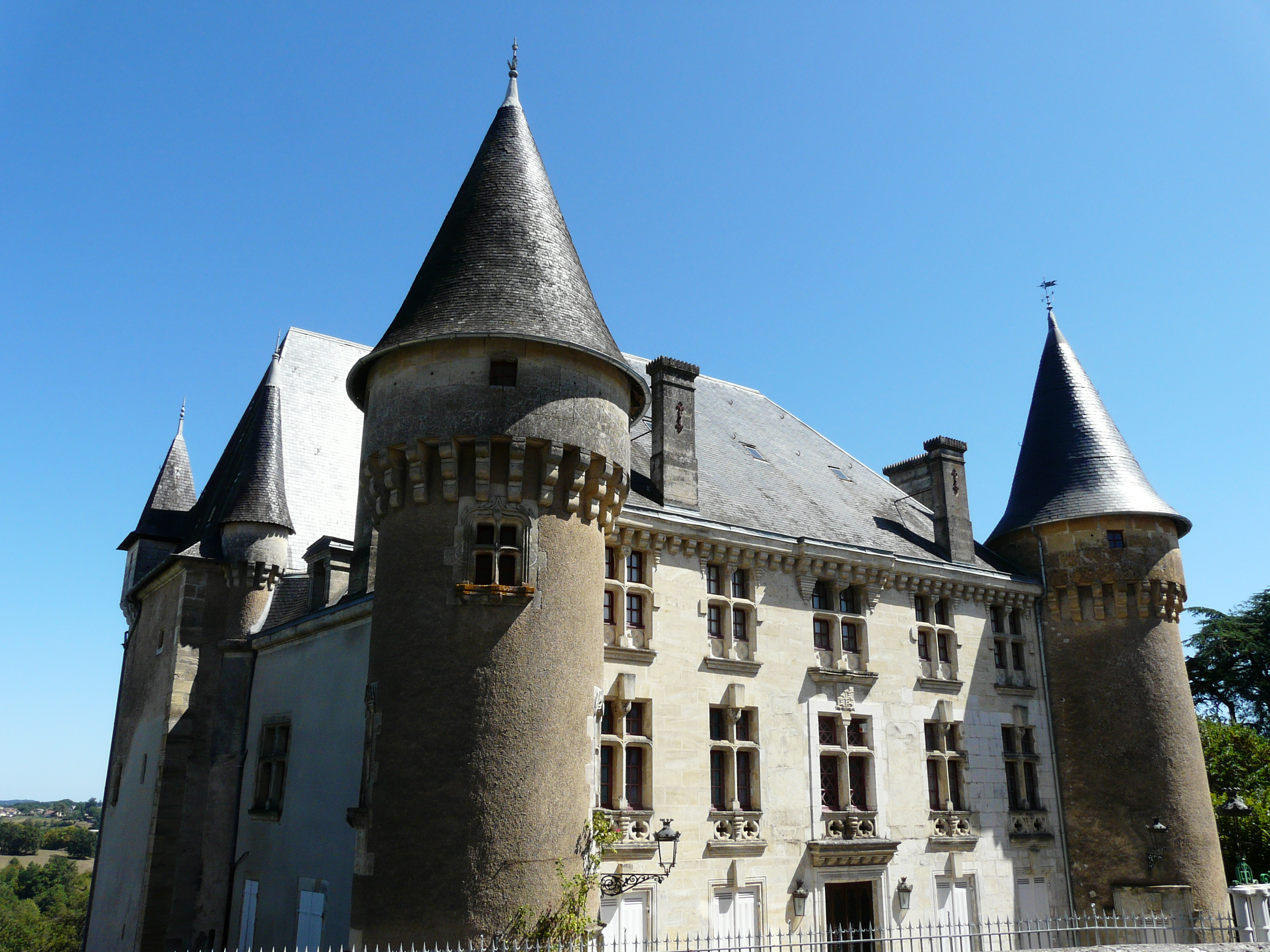
Château de Vaucocour

The Château de Vaucocour or Vaucocourt is a château in Thiviers, Dordogne, Nouvelle-Aquitaine, France.
