= Lempzours =

- Commune
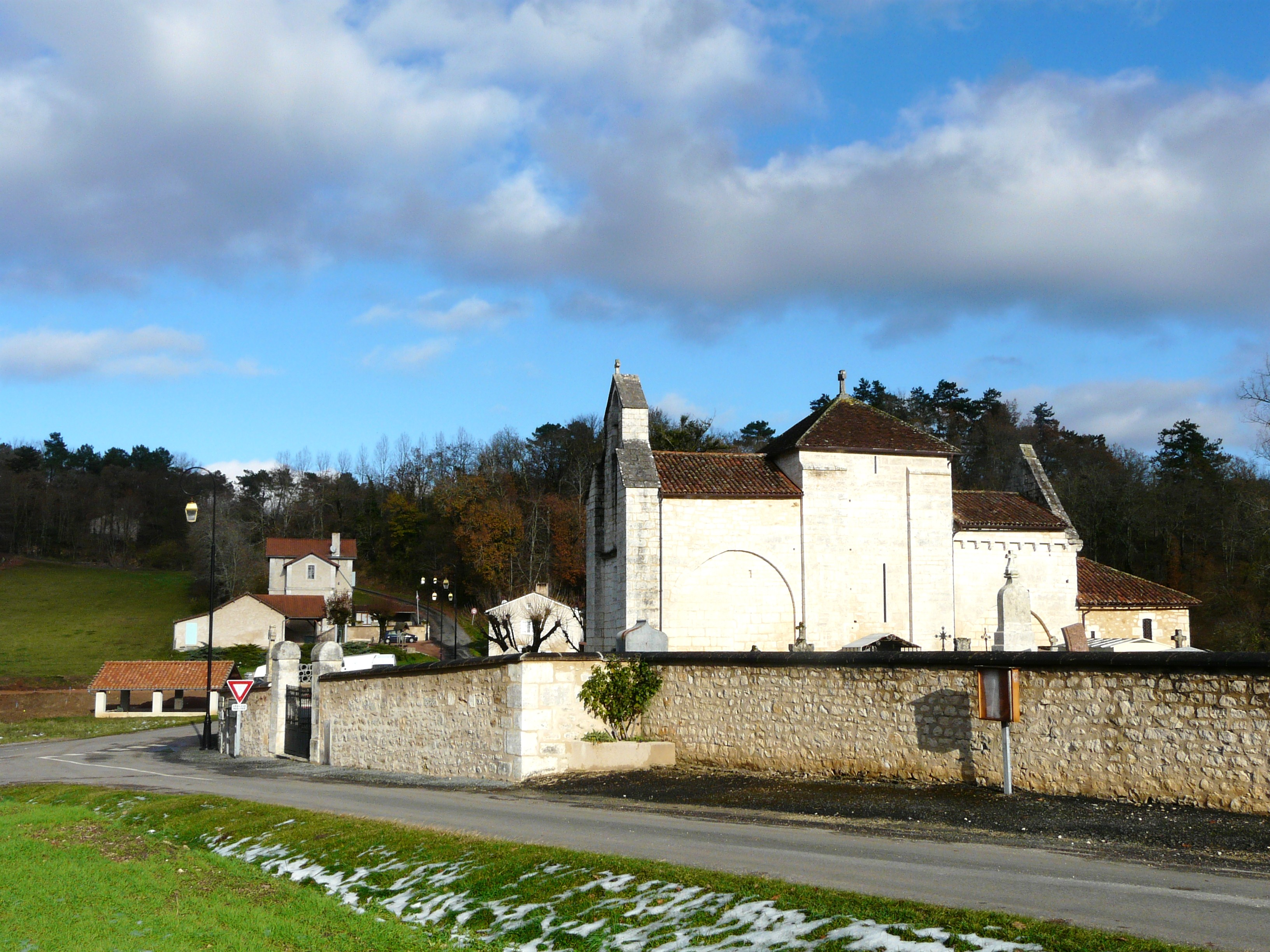
- A view within Lempzours

- Coat of arms
- Location of Lempzours
- Location within France Location within Nouvelle-Aquitaine
- Coordinates: 45°21′44″N 0°49′10″E
- Country: France
- Region: Nouvelle-Aquitaine
- Department: Dordogne
- Arrondissement: Nontron
- Canton: Thiviers

Government
  - Mayor (2020–2026): Thérèse Chassain
- Area^{1}: 10.87 km^{2} (4.20 sq mi)
- Elevation: 200 m (660 ft)
- Highest elevation: 232 m (761 ft)
- Lowest elevation: 137 m (449 ft)
- Population (2023): 134
  - Density: 12.3/km^{2} (31.9/sq mi)
- Time zone: UTC+01:00 (CET)
  - Summer (DST): UTC+02:00 (CEST)
- INSEE/Postal code: 24238 /24800
- ^{1} French Land Register data, which excludes lakes, ponds, glaciers > 1 km^{2} (0.386 sq mi or 247 acres) and river estuaries.

Lempzours is a commune in the Dordogne department in Nouvelle-Aquitaine in southwestern France. It is around 20 km north of Périgueux.

== Population ==
Historical population
| Year | Pop. | ±% p.a. |
|---|---|---|
| 1968 | 155 | — |
| 1975 | 139 | −1.54% |
| 1982 | 123 | −1.73% |
| 1990 | 121 | −0.20% |
| 1999 | 111 | −0.95% |
| 2007 | 132 | +2.19% |
| 2012 | 157 | +3.53% |
| 2017 | 134 | −3.12% |
| 2023 | 134 | +0.00% |
Source: INSEE

== See also ==
- Communes of the Dordogne department
