= Ligueux, Dordogne =

Ligueux
- Part of Sorges et Ligueux en Périgord
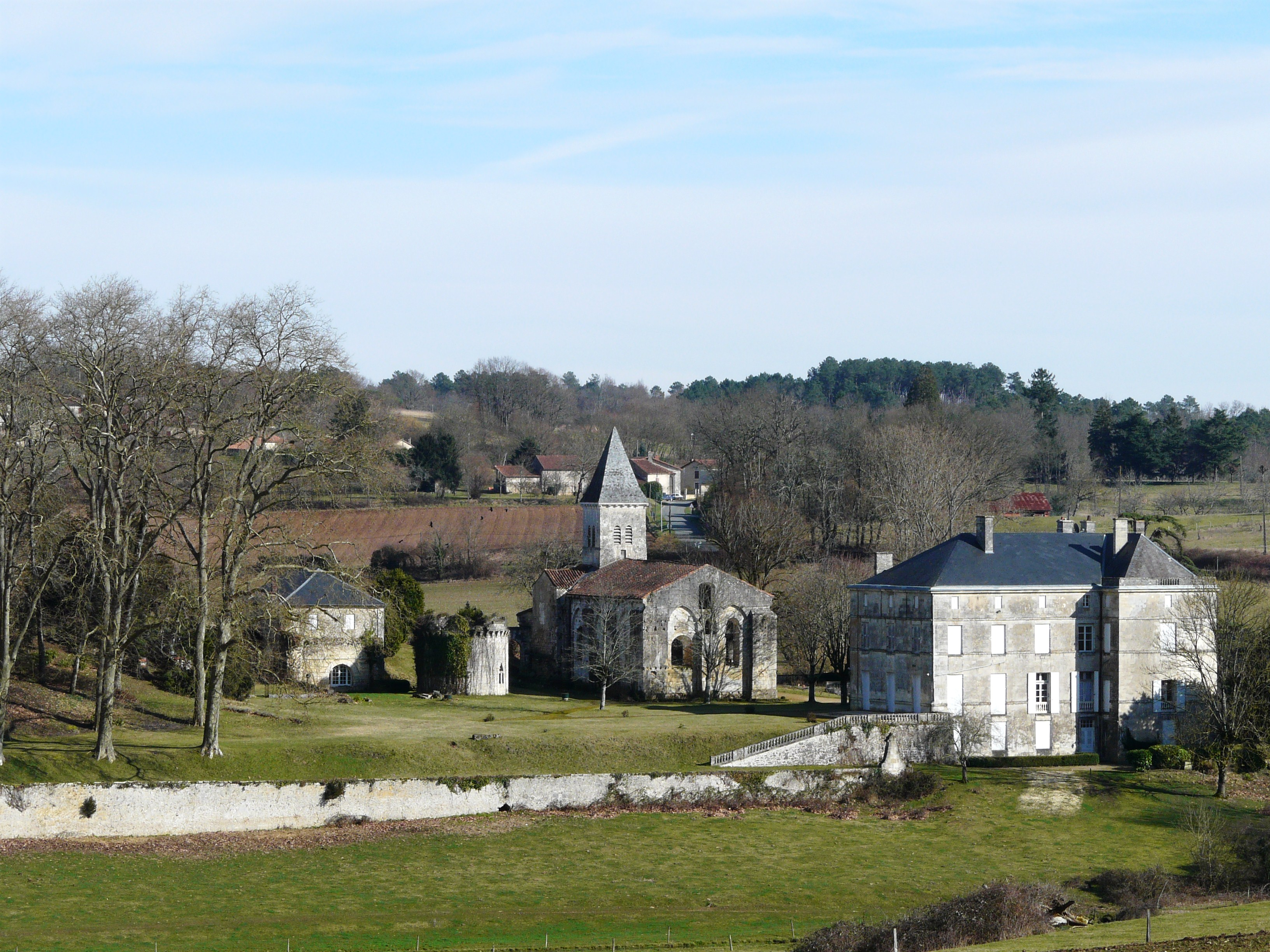
- Location of Ligueux
- Location within France Location within Nouvelle-Aquitaine
- Coordinates: 45°18′36″N 0°49′11″E
- Country: France
- Region: Nouvelle-Aquitaine
- Department: Dordogne
- Arrondissement: Périgueux
- Canton: Thiviers
- Commune: Sorges et Ligueux en Périgord
- Area^{1}: 6.66 km^{2} (2.57 sq mi)
- Elevation: 180 m (590 ft)
- Highest elevation: 212 m (696 ft)
- Lowest elevation: 133 m (436 ft)
- Population (2023): 312
  - Density: 46.8/km^{2} (121/sq mi)
- Time zone: UTC+01:00 (CET)
  - Summer (DST): UTC+02:00 (CEST)
- Postal code: 24460
- ^{1} French Land Register data, which excludes lakes, ponds, glaciers > 1 km^{2} (0.386 sq mi or 247 acres) and river estuaries.

Ligueux (French pronunciation: [liɡø]; Occitan: Ligüers) is a former commune in the Dordogne department in southwestern France. On 1 January 2016, it was merged into the new commune Sorges et Ligueux en Périgord.

== See also ==
- Communes of the Dordogne department
