= Sorges et Ligueux en Périgord =

- Commune
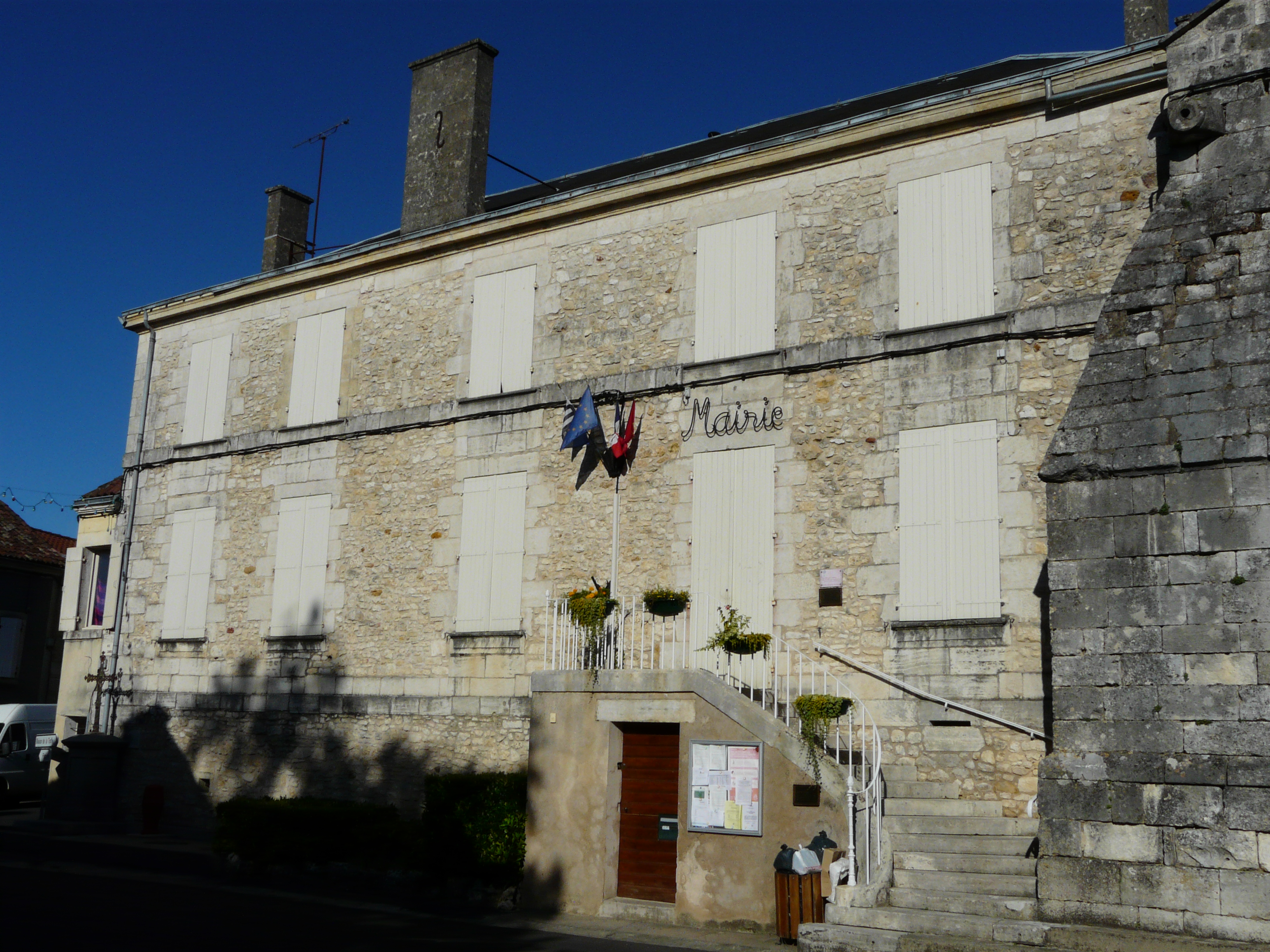
- The town hall in Sorges
- Location of Sorges et Ligueux en Périgord
- Location within France Location within Nouvelle-Aquitaine
- Coordinates: 45°18′18″N 0°52′19″E
- Country: France
- Region: Nouvelle-Aquitaine
- Department: Dordogne
- Arrondissement: Périgueux
- Canton: Thiviers
- Intercommunality: Le Grand Périgueux

Government
  - Mayor (2023–2026): Eric Seguy
- Area^{1}: 54.04 km^{2} (20.86 sq mi)
- Population (2023): 1,650
  - Density: 30.5/km^{2} (79.1/sq mi)
- Time zone: UTC+01:00 (CET)
  - Summer (DST): UTC+02:00 (CEST)
- INSEE/Postal code: 24540 /24420, 24460
- ^{1} French Land Register data, which excludes lakes, ponds, glaciers > 1 km^{2} (0.386 sq mi or 247 acres) and river estuaries.

Sorges et Ligueux en Périgord (French pronunciation: [sɔʁʒ e liɡø ɑ̃ peʁiɡɔʁ], literally Sorges and Ligueux in Périgord; Occitan: Sòrges e Ligüers de Perigòrd) is a commune in the Dordogne department of southwestern France. The municipality was established on 1 January 2016 and consists of the former communes of Sorges and Ligueux.

== See also ==
- Communes of the Dordogne department
