= Bussière-Galant station =

Railway station in Bussière-Galant, France

Coordinates: 45°36′28″N 1°01′33″E

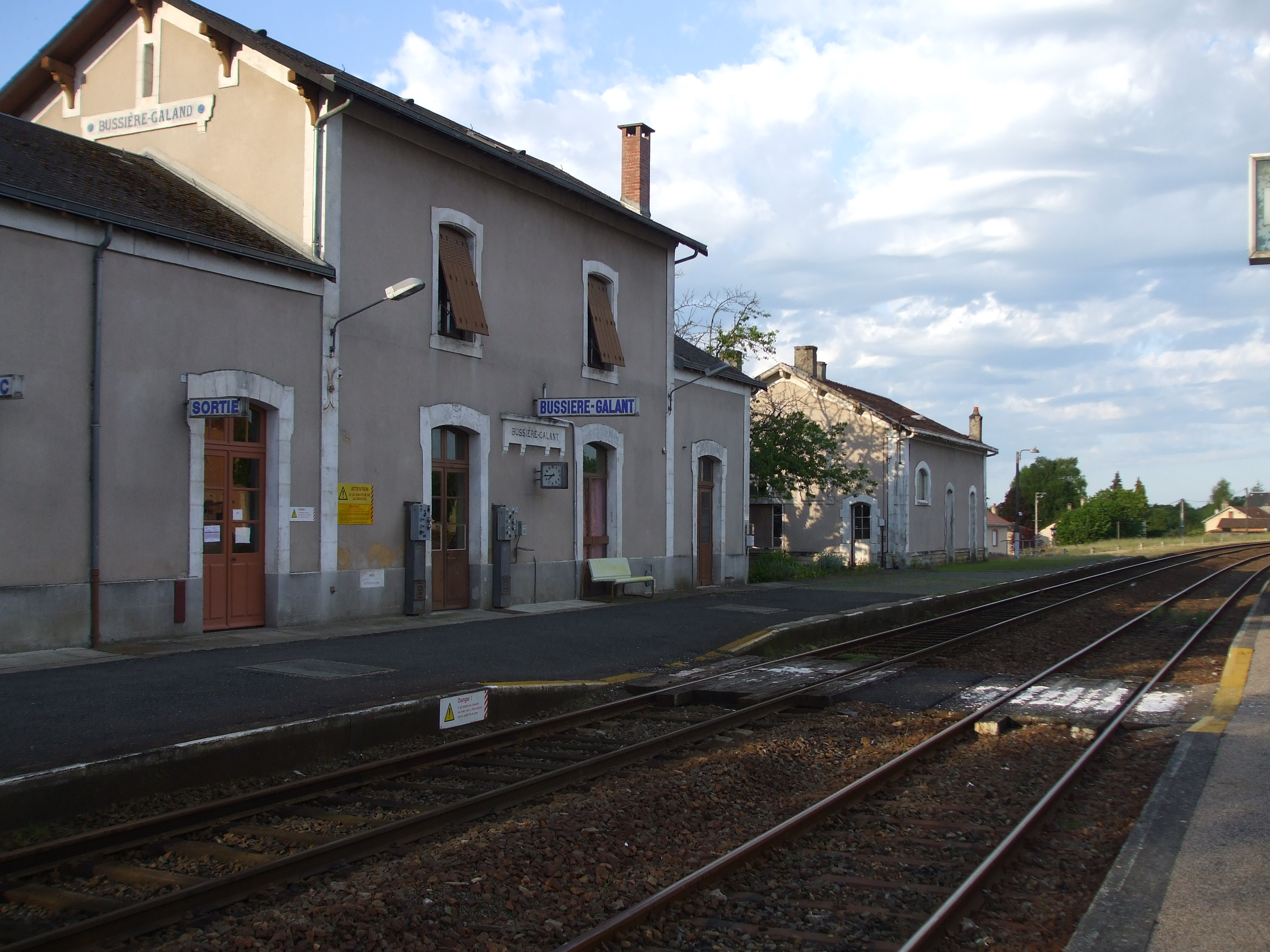
Bussière-Galant station

Bussière-Galant is a railway station in Bussière-Galant, Nouvelle-Aquitaine, France. The station is located on the Limoges-Bénédictins - Périgueux railway line. The station is served by TER (local) services operated by SNCF.

== Train services ==
The following services currently call at Bussière-Galant:

- local service (TER Nouvelle-Aquitaine) Limoges - Thiviers - Périgueux - Bordeaux

Preceding station	TER Nouvelle-Aquitaine	Following station
La Coquille towards Bordeaux	31	Lafarge towards Limoges
