= Saint-Jory-de-Chalais =

- Commune
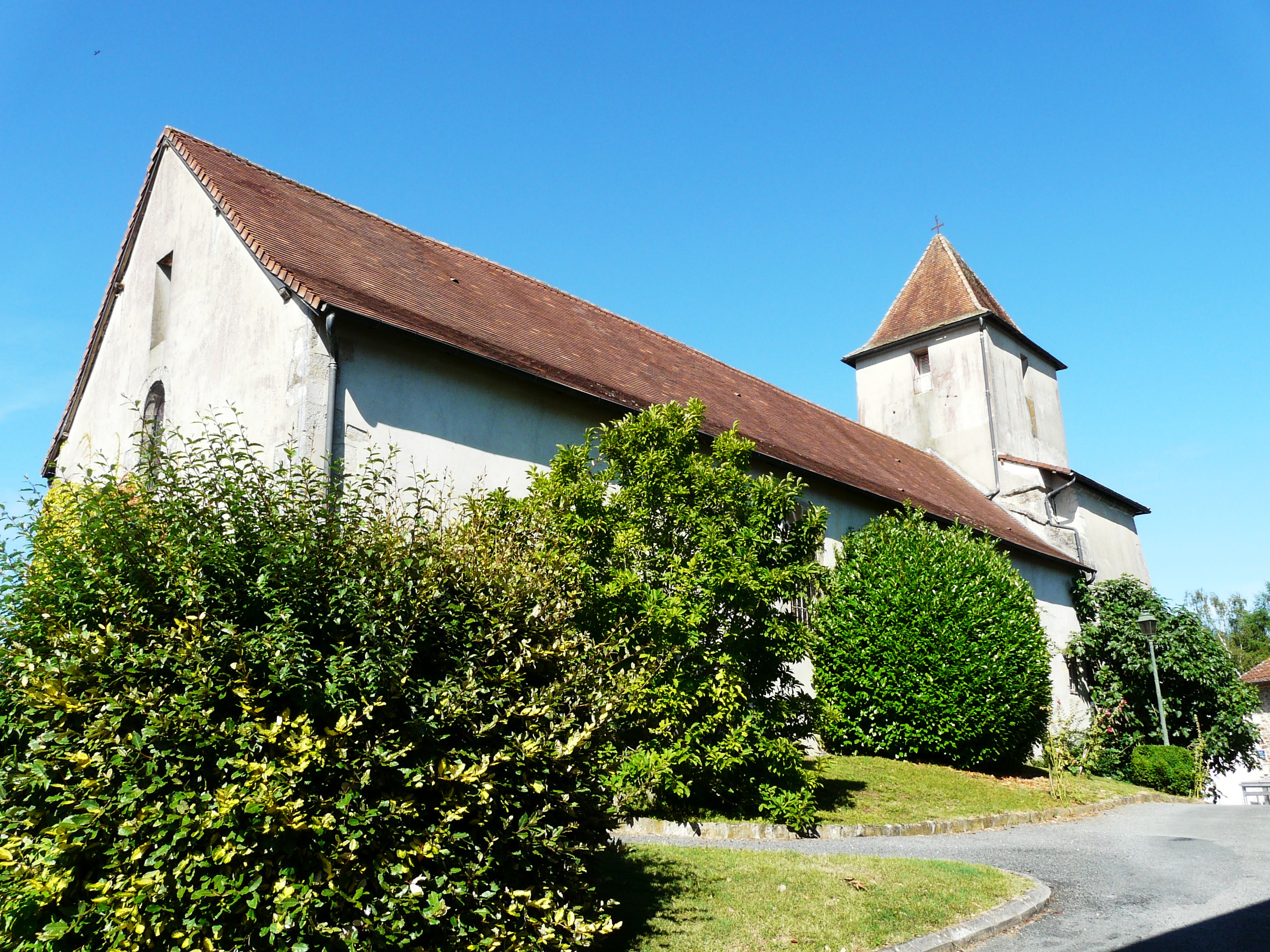
- The church in Saint-Jory-de-Chalais
- Location of Saint-Jory-de-Chalais
- Location within France Location within Nouvelle-Aquitaine
- Coordinates: 45°29′56″N 0°53′59″E
- Country: France
- Region: Nouvelle-Aquitaine
- Department: Dordogne
- Arrondissement: Nontron
- Canton: Thiviers

Government
  - Mayor (2020–2026): Bernard Vauriac
- Area^{1}: 31.73 km^{2} (12.25 sq mi)
- Elevation: 260 m (850 ft)
- Highest elevation: 304 m (997 ft)
- Lowest elevation: 178 m (584 ft)
- Population (2023): 544
  - Density: 17.1/km^{2} (44.4/sq mi)
- Time zone: UTC+01:00 (CET)
  - Summer (DST): UTC+02:00 (CEST)
- INSEE/Postal code: 24428 /24800
- ^{1} French Land Register data, which excludes lakes, ponds, glaciers > 1 km^{2} (0.386 sq mi or 247 acres) and river estuaries.

Saint-Jory-de-Chalais (French pronunciation: [sɛ̃ ʒɔʁi də ʃalɛ], literally Saint-Jory of Chalais; Occitan: Sent Jòri de Chalés) is a commune in the Dordogne department in Nouvelle-Aquitaine in southwestern France.

== Geography ==
The Côle flows south through the middle of the commune; it forms part of the commune's northern and southern borders.

== Population ==
Historical population
Year	Pop.	±% p.a.
1968	943	—
1975	827	−1.86%
1982	677	−2.82%
1990	600	−1.50%
1999	596	−0.07%
2007	630	+0.70%
2012	564	−2.19%
2017	584	+0.70%
2023	544	−1.18%
Source: INSEE

== Sights ==
- Arboretum des Pouyouleix

== See also ==
- Communes of the Dordogne department
