= Thiviers station =

Railway station in Thiviers, France

Coordinates: 45°25′07″N 0°55′15″E

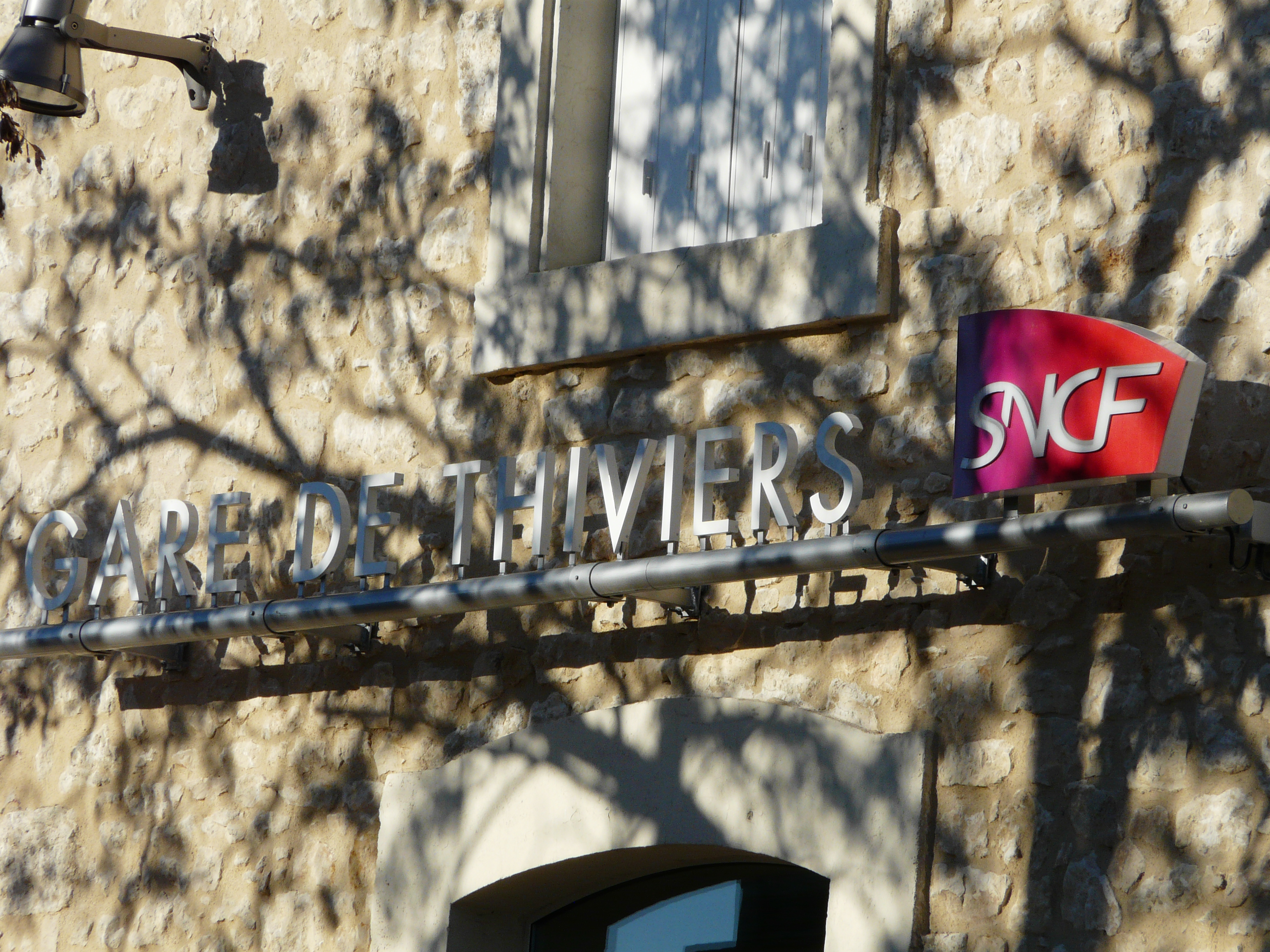

Thiviers is a railway station in Thiviers, Nouvelle-Aquitaine, France. The station is located on the Limoges-Bénédictins - Périgueux railway line. The station is served by TER (local) services operated by SNCF.

The station is served by regional trains to Bordeaux, Périgueux and Limoges.

Preceding station	TER Nouvelle-Aquitaine	Following station
Négrondes towards Bordeaux	31	La Coquille towards Limoges
