= Thiviers =

- Commune
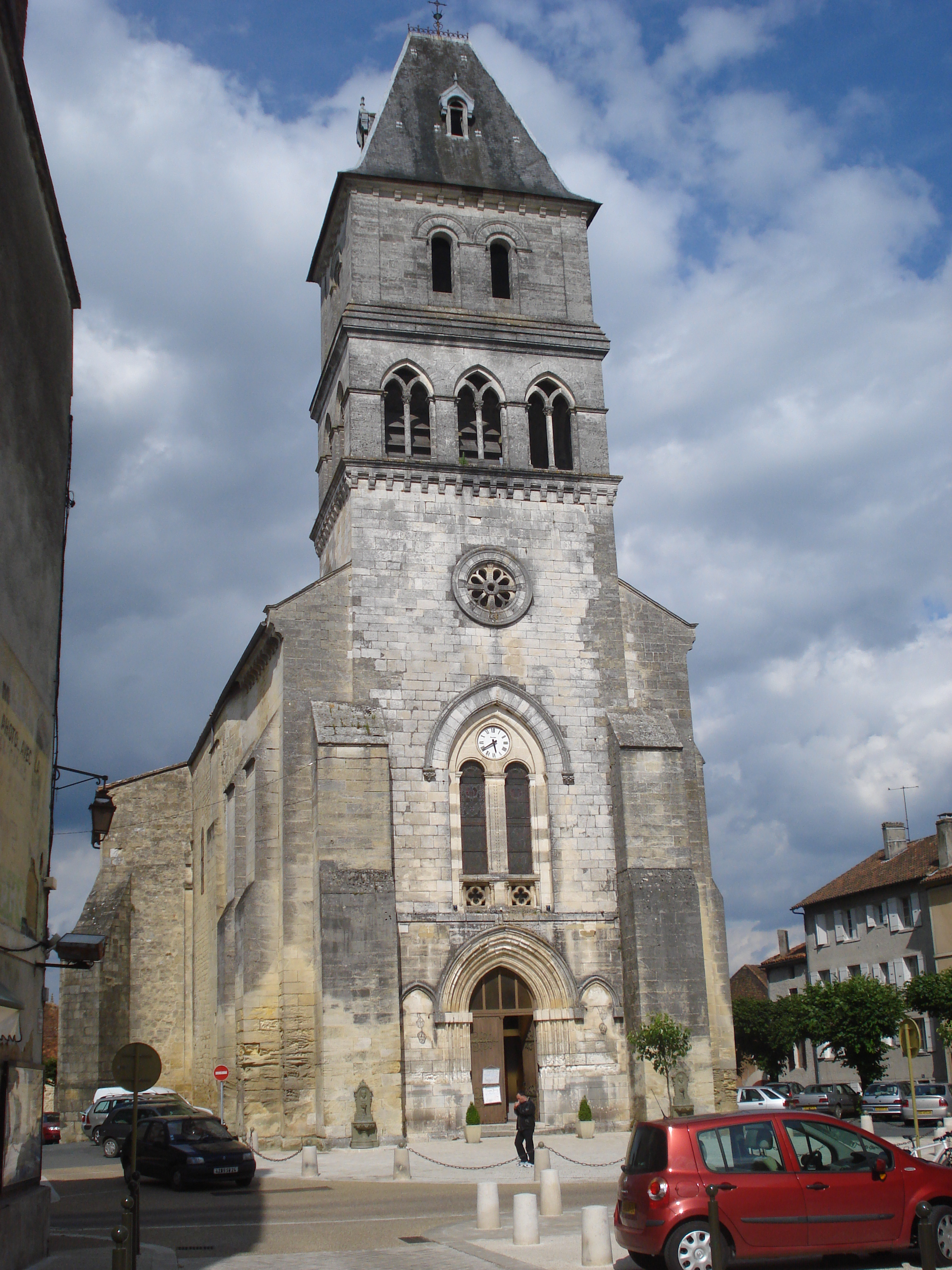
- The church in Thiviers

- Coat of arms
- Location of Thiviers
- Location within France Location within Nouvelle-Aquitaine
- Coordinates: 45°25′07″N 0°55′20″E
- Country: France
- Region: Nouvelle-Aquitaine
- Department: Dordogne
- Arrondissement: Nontron
- Canton: Thiviers

Government
  - Mayor (2020–2026): Isabelle Hyvoz
- Area^{1}: 27.77 km^{2} (10.72 sq mi)
- Highest elevation: 303 m (994 ft)
- Lowest elevation: 147 m (482 ft)
- Population (2023): 2,876
  - Density: 103.6/km^{2} (268.2/sq mi)
- Time zone: UTC+01:00 (CET)
  - Summer (DST): UTC+02:00 (CEST)
- INSEE/Postal code: 24551 /24800
- ^{1} French Land Register data, which excludes lakes, ponds, glaciers > 1 km^{2} (0.386 sq mi or 247 acres) and river estuaries.

Thiviers (French pronunciation: [tivje]; Occitan: Tivier) is a commune in the Dordogne department in Nouvelle-Aquitaine in southwestern France.

== Population ==
Historical population
Year	Pop.	±% p.a.
1968	3,838	—
1975	4,154	+1.14%
1982	3,915	−0.84%
1990	3,590	−1.08%
1999	3,261	−1.06%
2007	3,174	−0.34%
2012	3,115	−0.37%
2017	2,877	−1.58%
2023	2,876	−0.01%
Source: INSEE

== Personalities ==
It is notable as being the town in which Jean-Paul Sartre lived as a child. Painter Pierre Bouillon was born there.

== Geography ==
The Côle forms part of the commune's northwestern border. Thiviers station has rail connections to Bordeaux, Périgueux and Limoges.

== See also ==
- Château de Vaucocour
- Communes of the Dordogne department
