= Nantheuil =

- Commune
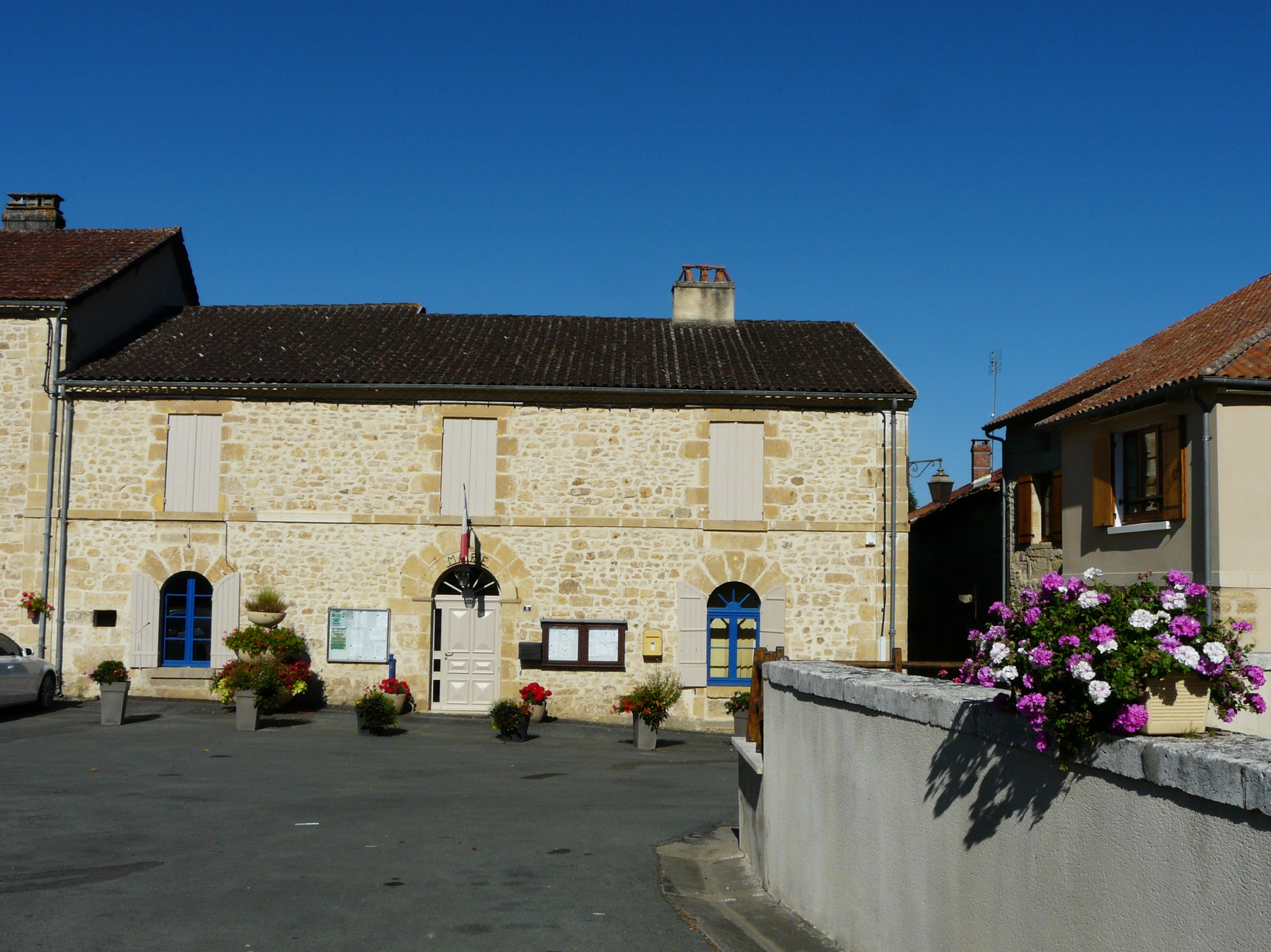
- The town hall in Nantheuil

- Coat of arms
- Location of Nantheuil
- Location within France Location within Nouvelle-Aquitaine
- Coordinates: 45°24′53″N 0°56′43″E
- Country: France
- Region: Nouvelle-Aquitaine
- Department: Dordogne
- Arrondissement: Nontron
- Canton: Thiviers

Government
  - Mayor (2020–2026): Bernadette Lagarde
- Area^{1}: 16.82 km^{2} (6.49 sq mi)
- Elevation: 212 m (696 ft)
- Highest elevation: 312 m (1,024 ft)
- Lowest elevation: 138 m (453 ft)
- Population (2023): 989
  - Density: 58.8/km^{2} (152/sq mi)
- Time zone: UTC+01:00 (CET)
  - Summer (DST): UTC+02:00 (CEST)
- INSEE/Postal code: 24304 /24800
- ^{1} French Land Register data, which excludes lakes, ponds, glaciers > 1 km^{2} (0.386 sq mi or 247 acres) and river estuaries.

Nantheuil (French pronunciation: [nɑ̃tœj]; Occitan: Nantuelh) is a commune in the Dordogne department in Nouvelle-Aquitaine in southwestern France.

== Population ==
Historical population
| Year | Pop. | ±% p.a. |
|---|---|---|
| 1968 | 826 | — |
| 1975 | 860 | +0.58% |
| 1982 | 921 | +0.98% |
| 1990 | 932 | +0.15% |
| 1999 | 901 | −0.38% |
| 2007 | 1,025 | +1.62% |
| 2012 | 988 | −0.73% |
| 2017 | 966 | −0.45% |
| 2023 | 989 | +0.39% |
Source: INSEE

== See also ==
- Communes of the Dordogne department
