= Saint-Priest-les-Fougères =

- Commune
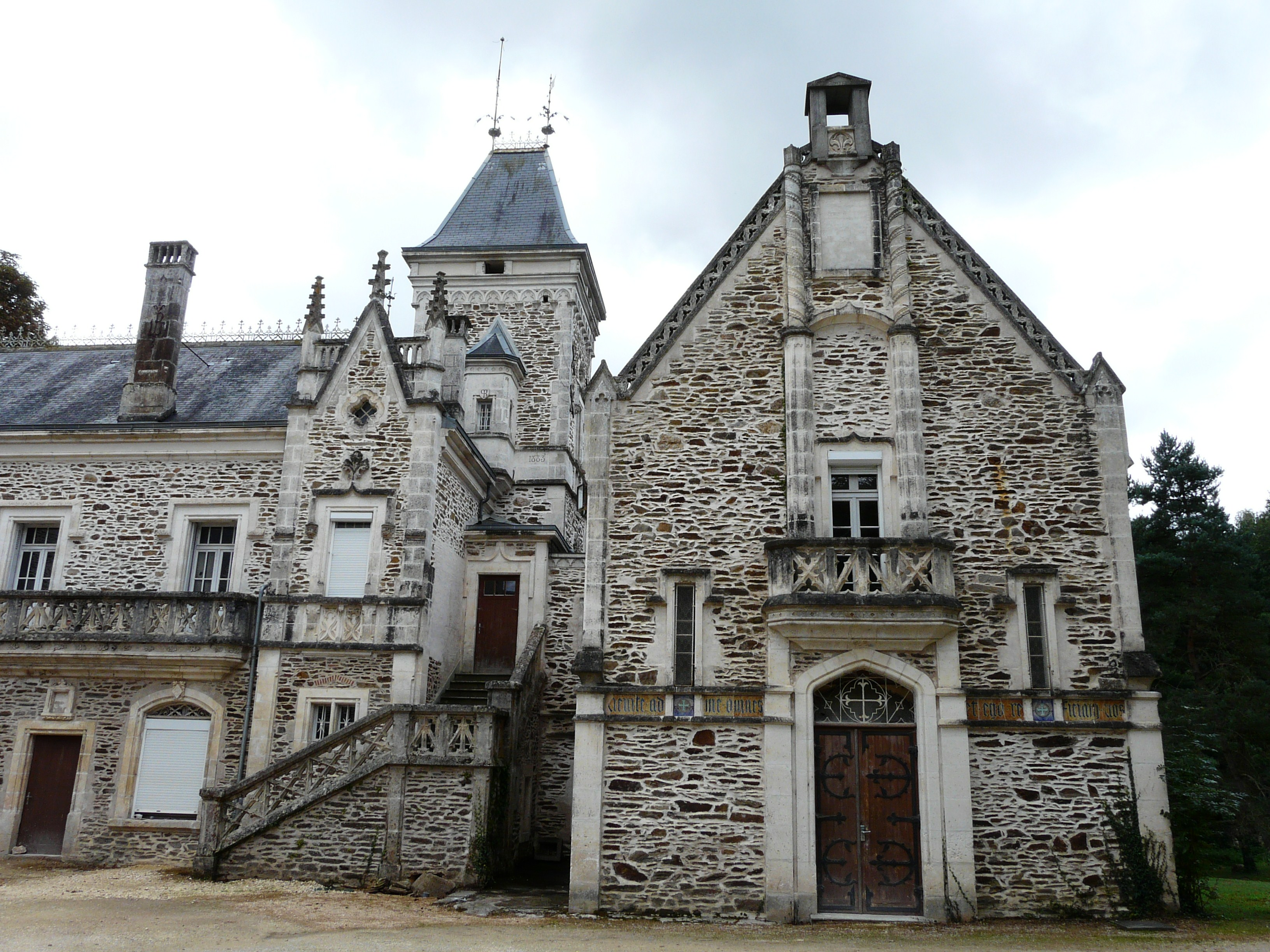
- Chateau of Oche

- Coat of arms
- Location of Saint-Priest-les-Fougères
- Location within France Location within Nouvelle-Aquitaine
- Coordinates: 45°32′38″N 1°00′42″E
- Country: France
- Region: Nouvelle-Aquitaine
- Department: Dordogne
- Arrondissement: Nontron
- Canton: Thiviers

Government
  - Mayor (2020–2026): Jean-Patrick Chaussadas
- Area^{1}: 20.86 km^{2} (8.05 sq mi)
- Elevation: 376 m (1,234 ft)
- Highest elevation: 411 m (1,348 ft)
- Lowest elevation: 257 m (843 ft)
- Population (2023): 380
  - Density: 18/km^{2} (47/sq mi)
- Time zone: UTC+01:00 (CET)
  - Summer (DST): UTC+02:00 (CEST)
- INSEE/Postal code: 24489 /24450
- ^{1} French Land Register data, which excludes lakes, ponds, glaciers > 1 km^{2} (0.386 sq mi or 247 acres) and river estuaries.

Saint-Priest-les-Fougères (French pronunciation: [sɛ̃ pʁijɛ(st) le fuʒɛʁ]; Occitan: Sent Prich las Faugieras) is a commune in the Dordogne department in Nouvelle-Aquitaine in southwestern France.

== Population ==
Historical population
| Year | Pop. | ±% p.a. |
|---|---|---|
| 1968 | 538 | — |
| 1975 | 508 | −0.82% |
| 1982 | 485 | −0.66% |
| 1990 | 443 | −1.13% |
| 1999 | 412 | −0.80% |
| 2007 | 391 | −0.65% |
| 2012 | 383 | −0.41% |
| 2017 | 381 | −0.10% |
| 2023 | 380 | −0.04% |
Source: INSEE

== See also ==
- Communes of the Dordogne department
