= La Coquille =

- Commune
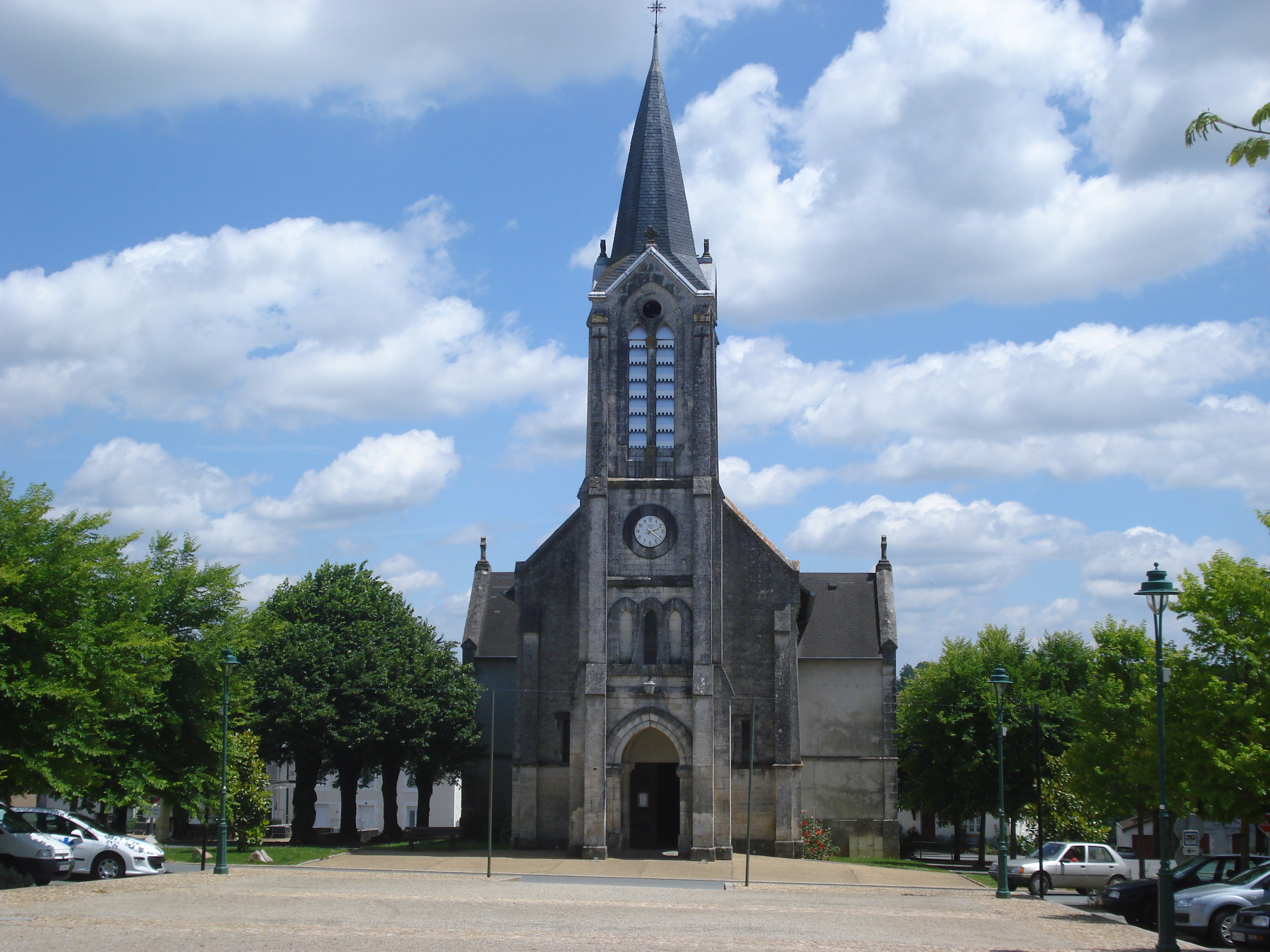
- The church in La Coquille

- Coat of arms
- Location of La Coquille
- Location within France Location within Nouvelle-Aquitaine
- Coordinates: 45°32′36″N 0°58′38″E
- Country: France
- Region: Nouvelle-Aquitaine
- Department: Dordogne
- Arrondissement: Nontron
- Canton: Thiviers

Government
  - Mayor (2020–2026): Michèle Faure
- Area^{1}: 22.37 km^{2} (8.64 sq mi)
- Highest elevation: 432 m (1,417 ft)
- Lowest elevation: 259 m (850 ft)
- Population (2023): 1,278
  - Density: 57.13/km^{2} (148.0/sq mi)
- Time zone: UTC+01:00 (CET)
  - Summer (DST): UTC+02:00 (CEST)
- INSEE/Postal code: 24133 /24450
- ^{1} French Land Register data, which excludes lakes, ponds, glaciers > 1 km^{2} (0.386 sq mi or 247 acres) and river estuaries.

La Coquille (French pronunciation: [la kɔkij]; Occitan: La Coquilha) is a commune in the Dordogne department in Nouvelle-Aquitaine in southwestern France.

La Coquille was on one of the five routes leading to Santiago de Compostela in Spain and it was in this parish that pilgrims were given a coquille Saint-Jacques, a scallop shell symbolic of the Way of St. James, the celebrated pilgrimage to Santiago de Compostela. From this fact came the name of the village of La Coquille.

The church in La Coquille was on the route of Richard the Lionheart, was reinaugurated by him and welcomed him during his journey.

As a community, the name of La Coquille only appeared officially in 1856, replacing the name of Sainte-Marie-de-Frugie.

== Geography ==
La Coquille is located in the Périgord in a heavily wooded area with meadows surrounding the peaceful little village. It is near the town of Nontron between Limoges and Périgueux. The Côle flows south through the northwestern part of the commune. La Coquille station has rail connections to Bordeaux, Périgueux and Limoges.

== Population ==
Historical population
Year	Pop.	±% p.a.
1968	1,556	—
1975	1,692	+1.20%
1982	1,575	−1.02%
1990	1,515	−0.48%
1999	1,489	−0.19%
2007	1,391	−0.85%
2012	1,345	−0.67%
2017	1,324	−0.31%
2023	1,278	−0.59%
Source: INSEE

== See also ==
- Communes of the Dordogne department
