= Canton of Thiviers =

Coordinates: 45.42°N 0.92°E

The canton of Thiviers is an administrative division of the Dordogne department, southwestern France. Its borders were modified at the French canton reorganisation which came into effect in March 2015. Its seat is in Thiviers.

It consists of the following communes:

1. Chalais
2. La Coquille
3. Corgnac-sur-l'Isle
4. Eyzerac
5. Firbeix
6. Jumilhac-le-Grand
7. Lempzours
8. Mialet
9. Nantheuil
10. Nanthiat
11. Négrondes
12. Saint-Front-d'Alemps
13. Saint-Jean-de-Côle
14. Saint-Jory-de-Chalais
15. Saint-Martin-de-Fressengeas
16. Saint-Paul-la-Roche
17. Saint-Pierre-de-Côle
18. Saint-Pierre-de-Frugie
19. Saint-Priest-les-Fougères
20. Saint-Romain-et-Saint-Clément
21. Sorges et Ligueux en Périgord
22. Thiviers
23. Vaunac
