= Chalais, Dordogne =

Chalais
- Commune
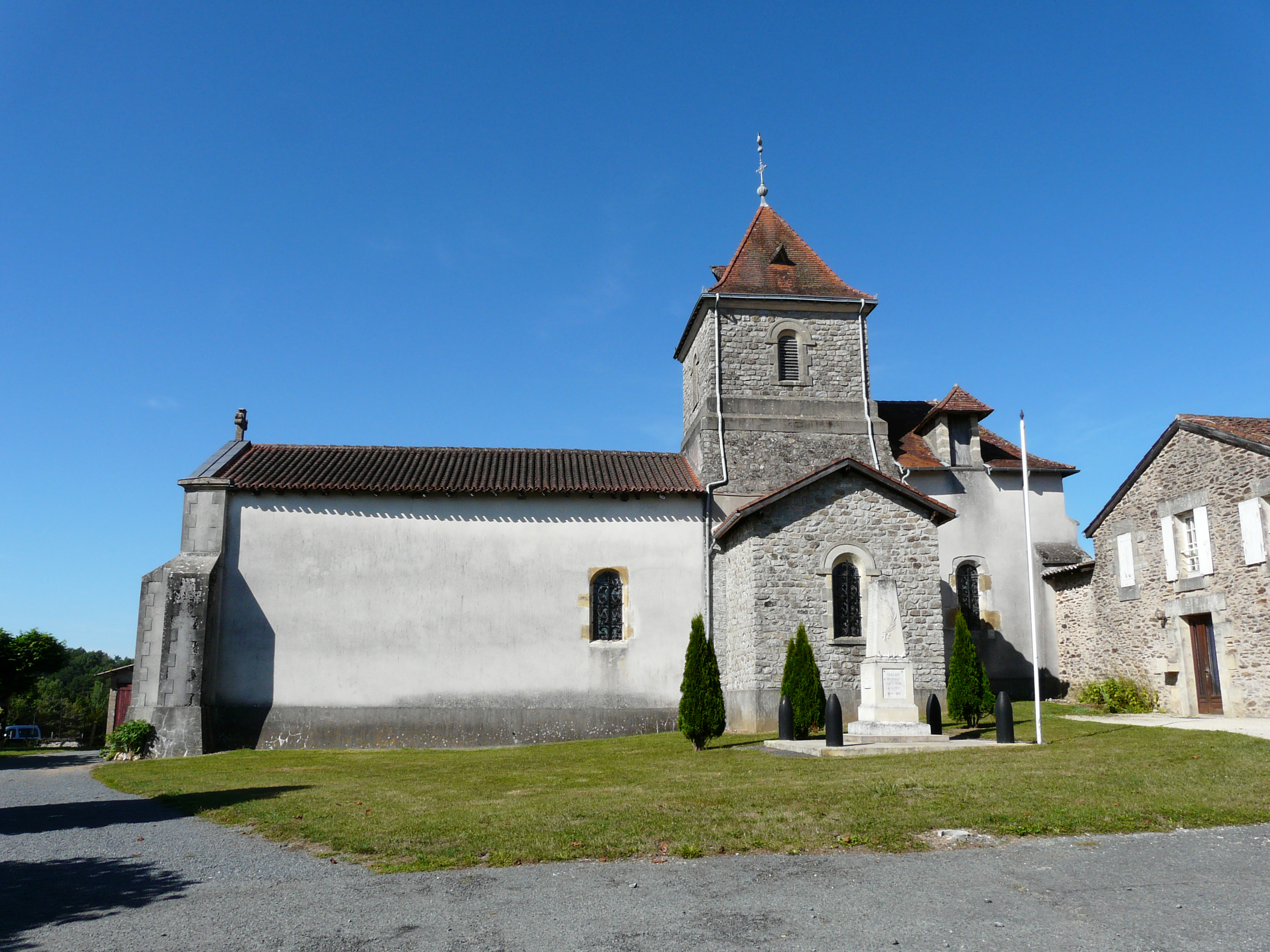
- The church in Chalais
- Location of Chalais
- Location within France Location within Nouvelle-Aquitaine
- Coordinates: 45°30′31″N 0°55′42″E
- Country: France
- Region: Nouvelle-Aquitaine
- Department: Dordogne
- Arrondissement: Nontron
- Canton: Thiviers

Government
  - Mayor (2020–2026): Jean-Louis Faye
- Area^{1}: 18.81 km^{2} (7.26 sq mi)
- Highest elevation: 313 m (1,027 ft)
- Lowest elevation: 220 m (720 ft)
- Population (2023): 405
  - Density: 21.5/km^{2} (55.8/sq mi)
- Time zone: UTC+01:00 (CET)
  - Summer (DST): UTC+02:00 (CEST)
- INSEE/Postal code: 24095 /24800
- ^{1} French Land Register data, which excludes lakes, ponds, glaciers > 1 km^{2} (0.386 sq mi or 247 acres) and river estuaries.

Chalais (French pronunciation: [ʃalɛ], before June 2009: Chaleix; Occitan: Chalés) is a commune in the Dordogne department in Nouvelle-Aquitaine in southwestern France.

== Population ==
Historical population
Year	Pop.	±% p.a.
1968	513	—
1975	456	−1.67%
1982	385	−2.39%
1990	425	+1.24%
1999	435	+0.26%
2007	443	+0.23%
2012	393	−2.37%
2017	404	+0.55%
2023	405	+0.04%
Source: INSEE

== See also ==
- Communes of the Dordogne department
