= Hélie de Bourdeilles =

French Franciscan friar, bishop and cardinal

Servant of God Hélie de Bourdeilles OFM
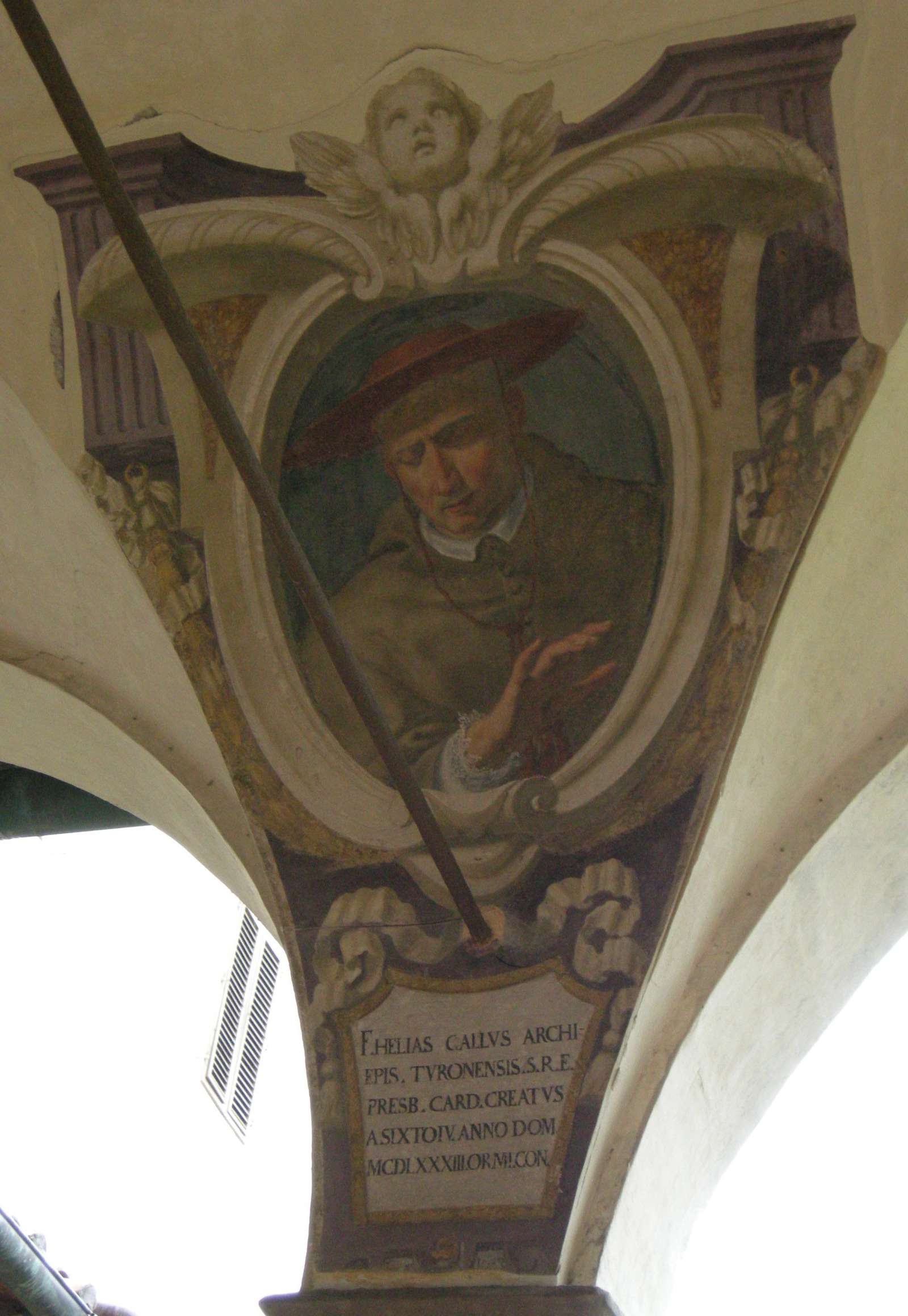
- Born: 1413; Agonac, Nouvelle-Aquitaine, Kingdom of France
- Died: 5 July 1484 (aged 70-71); Artannes, Tours, Kingdom of France

Hélie de Bourdeilles (ca. 1423, at the castle of Bourdeilles, Périgord – 5 July 1484, at Artannes near Tours) was a French Franciscan, Archbishop of Tours and Cardinal.

== Life ==
Bourdeilles was the son of the viscount Arnaud de Bourdeilles. Having entered the Order of Friars Minor at an early age, he was only twenty-four when, at the request of Charles VII of France, he was appointed to the See of Périgueux (1447).

During the wars between France and England he was held prisoner for several years by the English, in consequence of his defence of ecclesiastical immunity. In 1468, Bourdeilles was appointed to the Archiepiscopal See of Tours, and in 1483 he was raised to the cardinalate by Pope Sixtus IV. A stanch defender of the rights of the Church against the encroachments of the State, Bourdeilles advocated the abolition of the Pragmatic Sanction of Bourges, as may be seen from his treatise, Pro Pragmaticæ Sanctionis Abrogatione (Rome, 1486).

Bourdeilles continued, during his episcopate, to practise religious poverty and was an intimate friend of Francis of Paula. He is mentioned among the Blessed in the Franciscan Martyrology for 5 July.

He also wrote Libellus in Pragmaticam Sanctionem Gallorum (Rome, 1484); and a Latin defence of Jeanne d'Arc which is attached in manuscript to the process of her rehabilitation.

== Beatification process ==
A beatification process for Bourdeilles was opened, and he was granted the title of Servant of God. Theologians approved his spiritual writings on 26 February 1913.

== Sources ==
- Hugo von Hurter, Nomenclator (3d ed., Innsbruck, 1906), II, 1067–69
- For full text of his treatise on Jeanne d'Arc see Lanery de L'Arc, Livre d'or de Jeanne d'Arc (Paris, 1894)
