= Château d'Agonac =

Former castle converted into a château in Agonac in France

Coordinates: 45°17′34″N 0°45′02″E

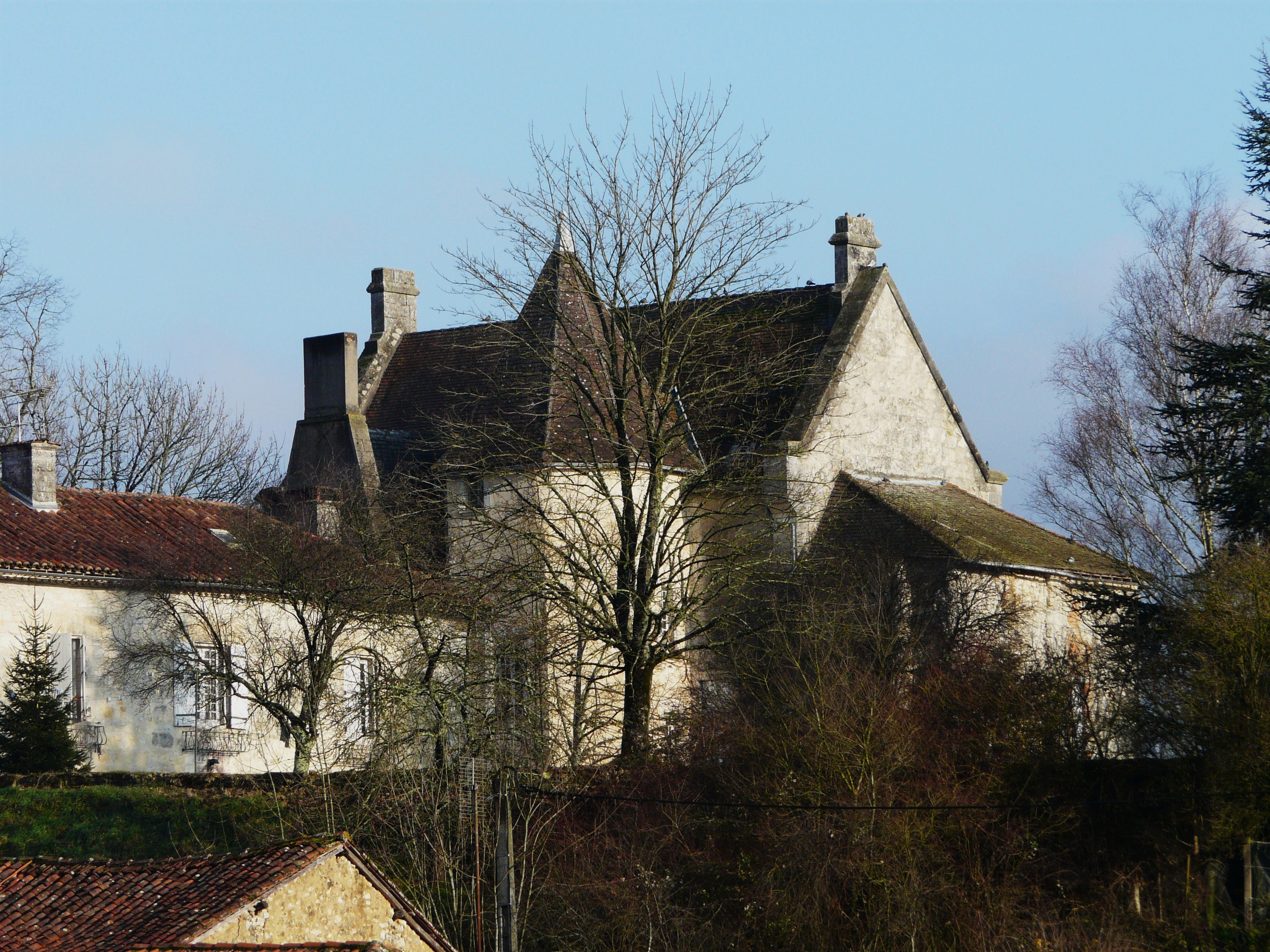
Château d'Agonac

The Château d'Agonac is a former castle, converted into a château, in the commune of Agonac in the Dordogne département of France.

== History ==
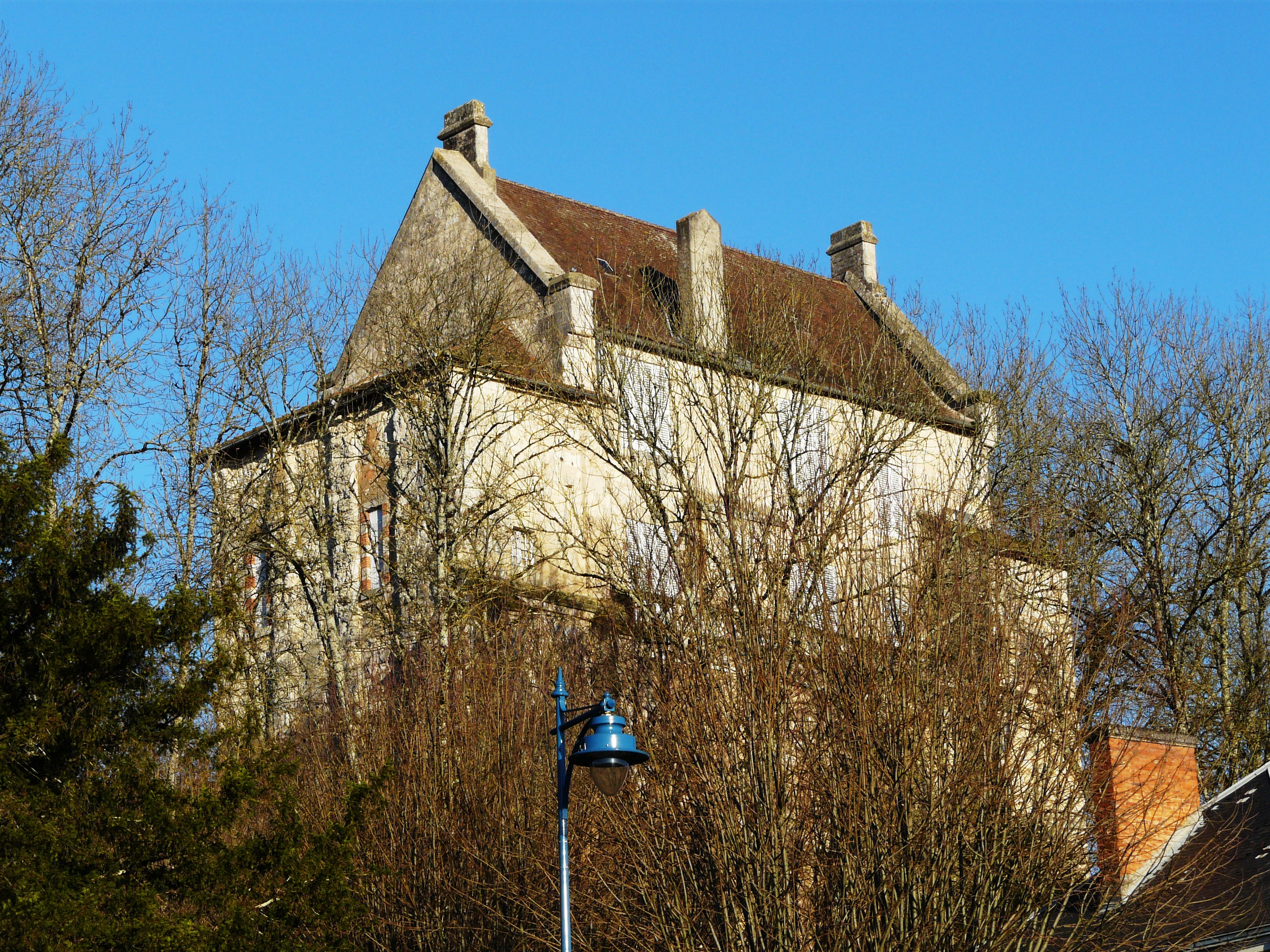
The château seen from the bank of the Beauronne

The early fort, Castrum Agoniacum, residence of the Bishops of Périgueux, was erected around 980 by Bishop Frotaire de Gourdon to defend Périgueux from the Normans.

The oldest parts of the present château are the remains of the enceinte and the keep, which date from the 12th century, and the chapel from the 13th. The other buildings were modified between the 16th and 19th centuries.

== See also ==
- List of castles in France
