= Château des Bories =

Château in Dordogne, Nouvelle-Aquitaine, France

Coordinates: 45°13′08″N 0°50′38″E

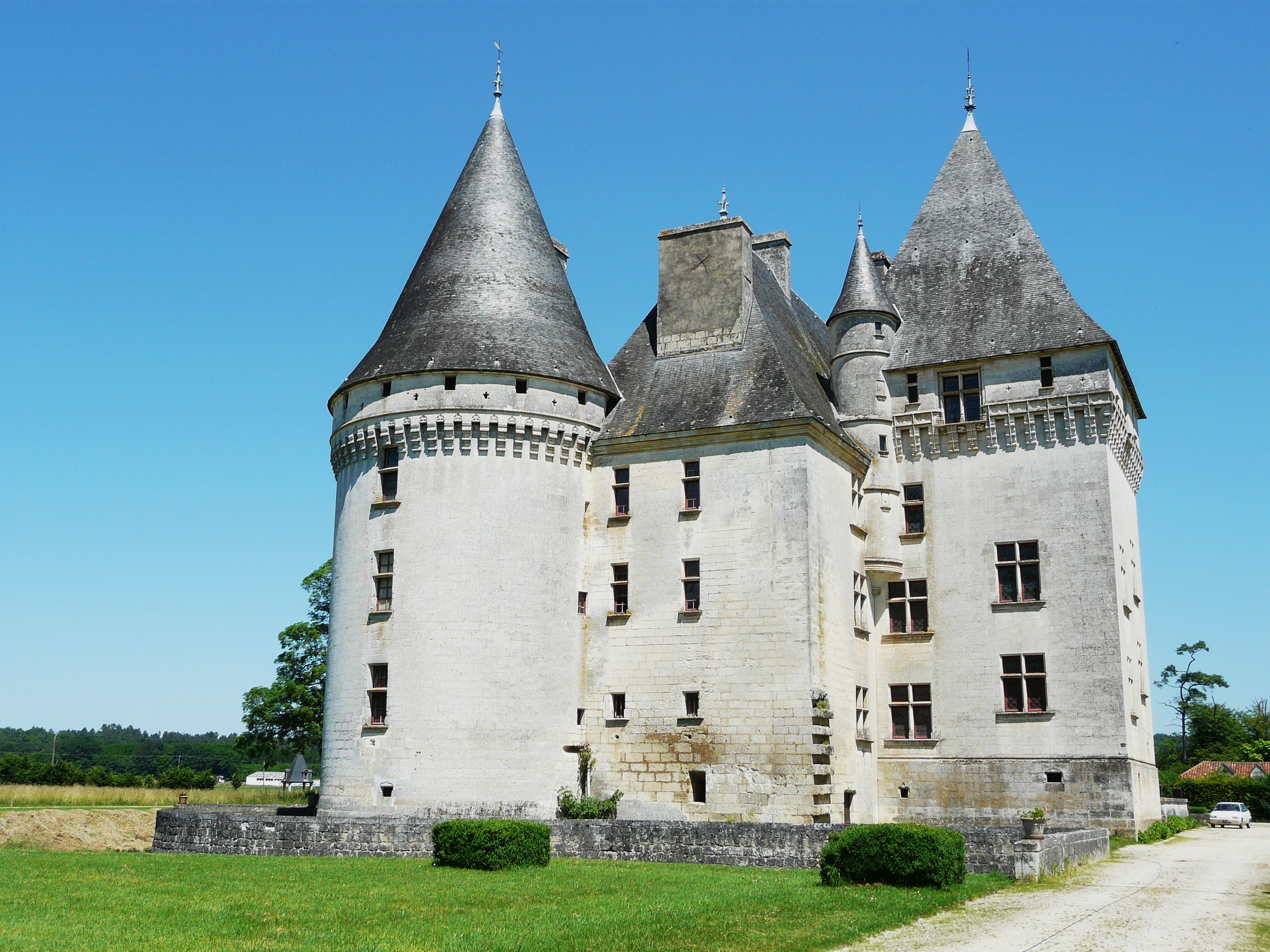
The château

The Château des Bories is a château at Antonne-et-Trigonant in Dordogne, Nouvelle-Aquitaine, France. The castle dates back to the late 15th and early 16th centuries. It has fortified towers, a monumental staircase and a dry moat. It is the home of the Lary de Latour family.

== History ==
A lodge stood here in the 15th century. The present building was begun in 1497. It was completed in 1604 by the Protestant Henri de Saint-Astier who saw it taken by the Catholics. In 1652, supporters of The Fronde occupied the castle. At the time of the French Revolution, the castle was to have been demolished, but only the walls courtyard were taken down and the ditches filled in.

== Description ==
The château consists of a long rectangular corps de logis with two large round towers and a square tower containing a staircase. The staircase is seen as the prototype of the French monumental staircases that developed in the 17th century. A bartizan or échauguette decorates the south eastern corner, and a turret containing a spiral staircase leads to the roofs, continuing the square staircase. The building maintains its defensive look, with machicolated towers, ditches, a drawbridge and a fortified court. The three storey building stands above vaulted cellars.
