= Champcevinel =

- Commune
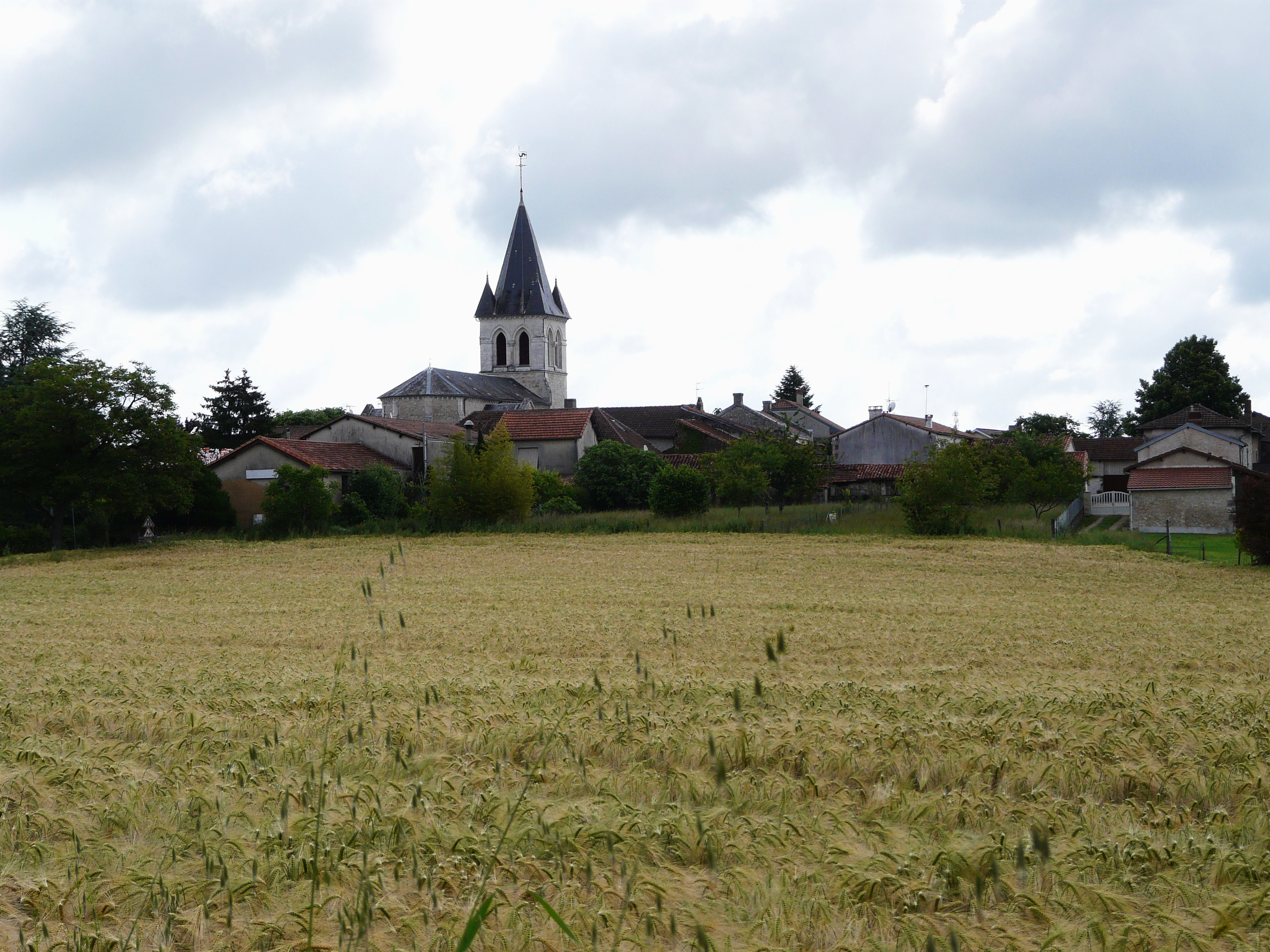
- A general view of Champcevinel

- Coat of arms
- Location of Champcevinel
- Location within France Location within Nouvelle-Aquitaine
- Coordinates: 45°12′56″N 0°43′38″E
- Country: France
- Region: Nouvelle-Aquitaine
- Department: Dordogne
- Arrondissement: Périgueux
- Canton: Trélissac
- Intercommunality: Le Grand Périgueux

Government
  - Mayor (2020–2026): Christian Lecomte
- Area^{1}: 17.72 km^{2} (6.84 sq mi)
- Elevation: 190 m (620 ft)
- Highest elevation: 237 m (778 ft)
- Lowest elevation: 86 m (282 ft)
- Population (2023): 3,126
  - Density: 176.4/km^{2} (456.9/sq mi)
- Time zone: UTC+01:00 (CET)
  - Summer (DST): UTC+02:00 (CEST)
- INSEE/Postal code: 24098 /24750
- ^{1} French Land Register data, which excludes lakes, ponds, glaciers > 1 km^{2} (0.386 sq mi or 247 acres) and river estuaries.

Champcevinel (French pronunciation: [ʃɑ̃səvinɛl]; Occitan: Champsavineu) is a commune in the Dordogne department in Nouvelle-Aquitaine in southwestern France.

== Geography ==
=== Generalities ===
Being part of the urban unit of Périgueux, Champcevinel is located at the north of the main city. It's 4 km far from the city centre of Périgueux.

Champcevinel makes the immediate suburb of Périgueux, at north between the Routes Départementales 3 and 8.

=== Adjacent communes ===
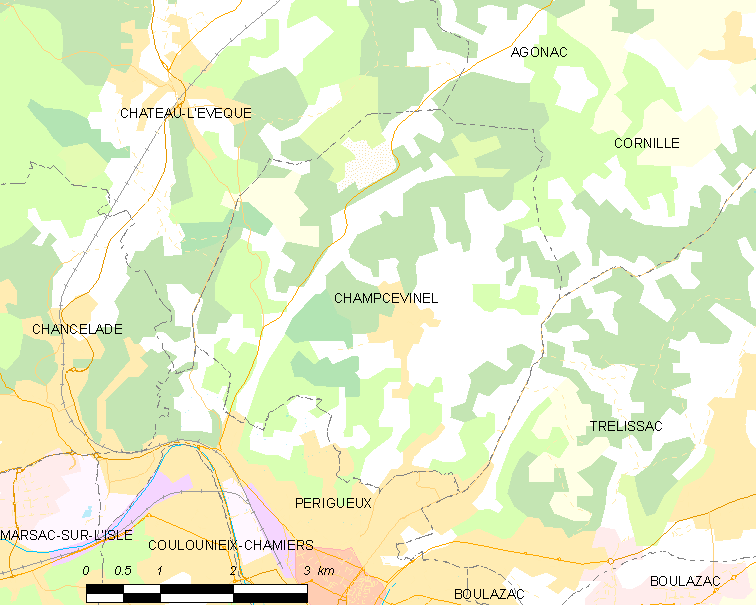
Map of adjacent communes of Champcevinel

Champcevinel is adjacent to five others communes. At the west of the commune, the territory of Chancelade is less than 300 meters far.

=== Geology and topography ===
Located in north of Aquitaine Basin and bordered by a part of the Massif Central, the Dordogne department shows a big diversity of geology. The terrains are disposed in depth in regular stratums, causing a sediment on this old marine platform.

Map of geology of Champcevinel

== Population ==
Historical population

Year	Pop.	±% p.a.
1800	816	—
1806	801	−0.31%
1821	818	+0.14%
1831	681	−1.82%
1836	852	+4.58%
1841	864	+0.28%
1846	766	−2.38%
1851	800	+0.87%
1856	834	+0.84%
1861	836	+0.05%
1866	800	−0.88%
1872	777	−0.49%
1876	781	+0.13%
1881	801	+0.51%
1886	810	+0.22%
1891	760	−1.27%
1896	701	−1.60%
1901	684	−0.49%

Year	Pop.	±% p.a.
1906	684	+0.00%
1911	690	+0.17%
1921	563	−2.01%
1926	594	+1.08%
1931	607	+0.43%
1936	626	+0.62%
1946	668	+0.65%
1954	666	−0.04%
1962	914	+4.04%
1968	1,127	+3.55%
1975	1,359	+2.71%
1982	1,697	+3.22%
1990	2,208	+3.35%
1999	2,335	+0.62%
2007	2,486	+0.79%
2012	2,782	+2.28%
2017	2,880	+0.69%
2023	3,126	+1.38%

Source: EHESS and INSEE (1968-2023)

== See also ==
- Communes of the Dordogne department
