= Trélissac =

- Commune
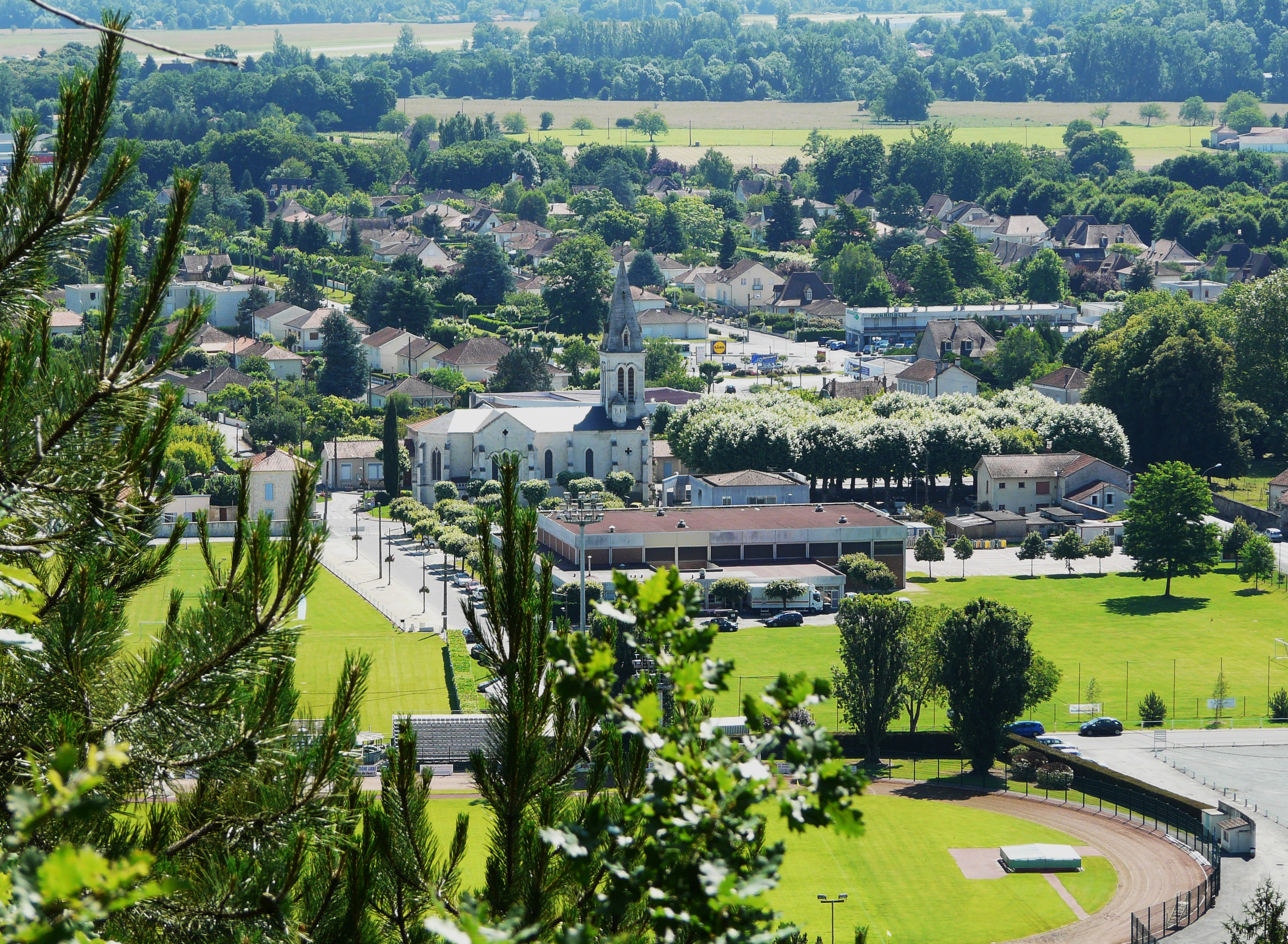
- A general view of Trélissac
- Location of Trélissac
- Location within France Location within Nouvelle-Aquitaine
- Coordinates: 45°11′48″N 0°47′00″E
- Country: France
- Region: Nouvelle-Aquitaine
- Department: Dordogne
- Arrondissement: Périgueux
- Canton: Trélissac
- Intercommunality: Le Grand Périgueux

Government
  - Mayor (2020–2026): Francis Colbac
- Area^{1}: 22.88 km^{2} (8.83 sq mi)
- Elevation: 91 m (299 ft)
- Highest elevation: 239 m (784 ft)
- Lowest elevation: 82 m (269 ft)
- Population (2023): 7,372
  - Density: 322.2/km^{2} (834.5/sq mi)
- Time zone: UTC+01:00 (CET)
  - Summer (DST): UTC+02:00 (CEST)
- INSEE/Postal code: 24557 /24750
- ^{1} French Land Register data, which excludes lakes, ponds, glaciers > 1 km^{2} (0.386 sq mi or 247 acres) and river estuaries.

Trélissac (French pronunciation: [tʁelisak]; Occitan: Trelhissac) is a commune in the Dordogne department in Nouvelle-Aquitaine in southwestern France.

== Population ==
Historical population

Year	Pop.	±% p.a.
1800	918	—
1806	1,132	+3.55%
1821	1,172	+0.23%
1831	1,217	+0.38%
1836	1,104	−1.93%
1841	1,129	+0.45%
1846	1,092	−0.66%
1851	1,135	+0.78%
1856	1,181	+0.80%
1861	1,128	−0.91%
1866	1,203	+1.30%
1872	1,163	−0.56%
1876	1,217	+1.14%
1881	1,221	+0.07%
1886	1,307	+1.37%
1891	1,388	+1.21%
1896	1,288	−1.48%
1901	1,329	+0.63%

Year	Pop.	±% p.a.
1906	1,328	−0.02%
1911	1,346	+0.27%
1921	1,248	−0.75%
1926	1,265	+0.27%
1931	1,483	+3.23%
1936	1,866	+4.70%
1946	2,441	+2.72%
1954	2,480	+0.20%
1962	3,847	+5.64%
1968	5,037	+4.59%
1975	5,502	+1.27%
1982	6,186	+1.69%
1990	6,660	+0.93%
1999	6,422	−0.40%
2007	6,617	+0.37%
2012	6,988	+1.10%
2017	6,658	−0.96%
2023	7,372	+1.71%

Source: EHESS and INSEE (1968–2023)

== See also ==
- Communes of the Dordogne department
