= Château-l'Évêque station =

Railway station in France

Coordinates: 45°14′40″N 0°41′17″E

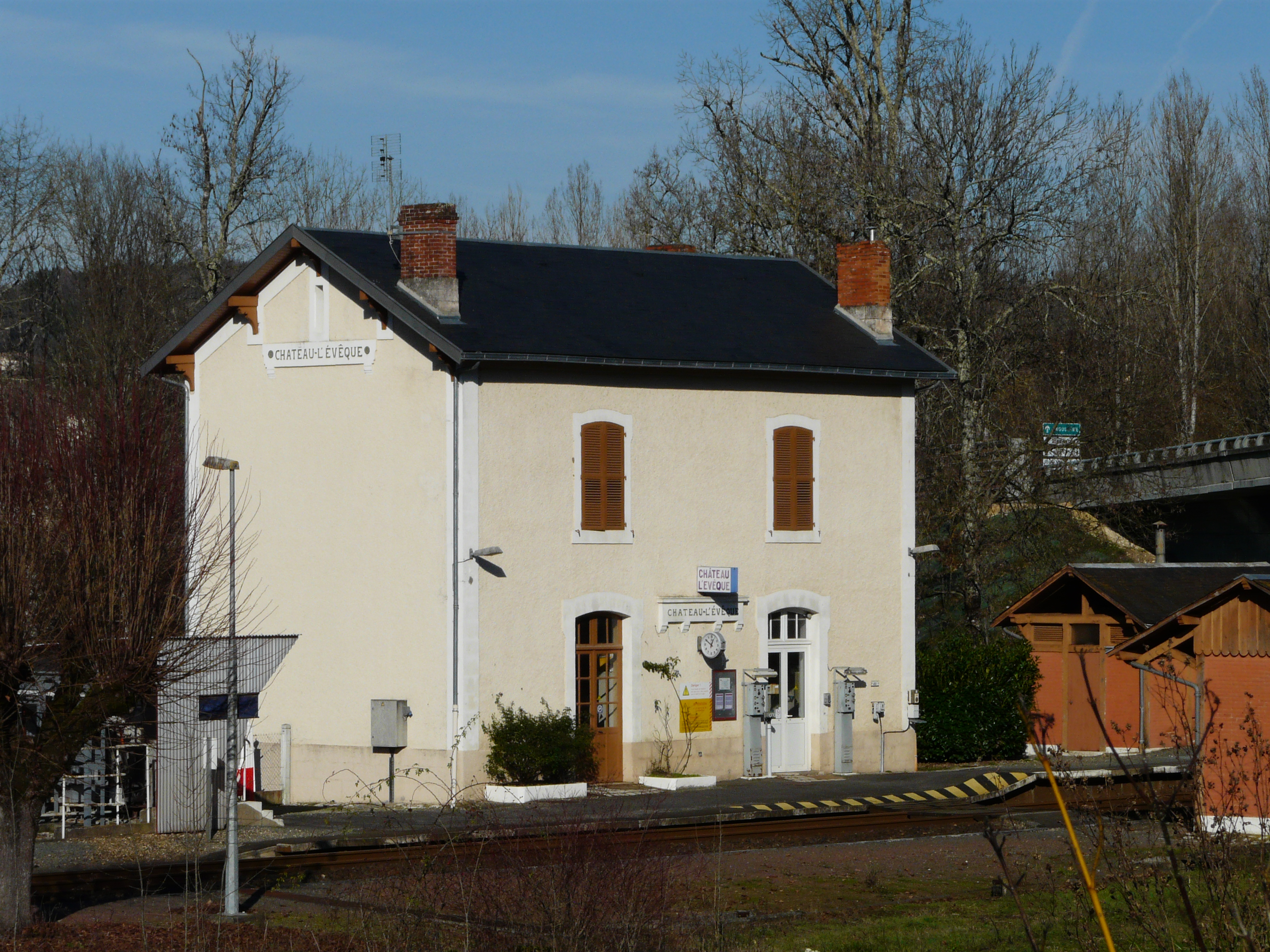
Château-l'Évêque station

Château-l'Évêque is a railway station in Château-l'Évêque, Nouvelle-Aquitaine, France. The station is located on the Limoges-Bénédictins - Périgueux railway line. The station is served by TER (local) services operated by SNCF.

== Train services ==
The following services currently call at Château-l'Évêque:

- local service (TER Nouvelle-Aquitaine) Limoges - Thiviers - Périgueux - Bordeaux

Preceding station	TER Nouvelle-Aquitaine	Following station
Périgueux towards Bordeaux	31	Agonac towards Limoges
