= Sarliac-sur-l'Isle =

- Commune
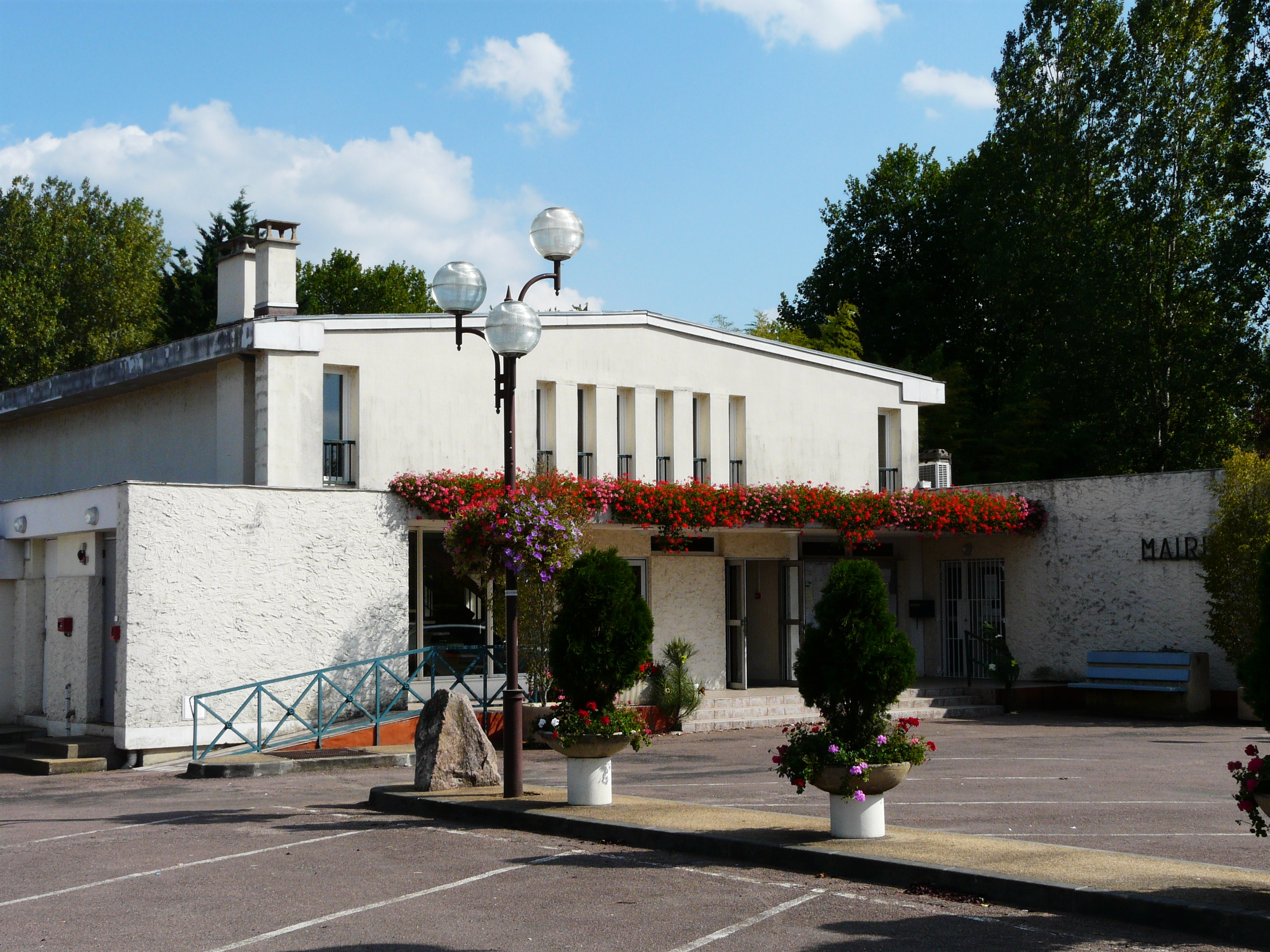
- The town hall in Sarliac-sur-l'Isle
- Location of Sarliac-sur-l'Isle
- Location within France Location within Nouvelle-Aquitaine
- Coordinates: 45°14′24″N 0°52′33″E
- Country: France
- Region: Nouvelle-Aquitaine
- Department: Dordogne
- Arrondissement: Périgueux
- Canton: Trélissac
- Intercommunality: Le Grand Périgueux

Government
  - Mayor (2020–2026): Alain Buffière
- Area^{1}: 9.57 km^{2} (3.69 sq mi)
- Elevation: 102 m (335 ft)
- Highest elevation: 206 m (676 ft)
- Lowest elevation: 97 m (318 ft)
- Population (2023): 1,054
  - Density: 110/km^{2} (285/sq mi)
- Time zone: UTC+01:00 (CET)
  - Summer (DST): UTC+02:00 (CEST)
- INSEE/Postal code: 24521 /24420
- ^{1} French Land Register data, which excludes lakes, ponds, glaciers > 1 km^{2} (0.386 sq mi or 247 acres) and river estuaries.

Sarliac-sur-l'Isle (French pronunciation: [saʁljak syʁ lil]; Occitan: Sarlhac d'Eila) is a commune in the Dordogne department in Nouvelle-Aquitaine in southwestern France.

== Toponymy ==
The name of the commune comes from that of a person of Gallo-Roman origin, Cærellius, followed by the suffix -acum, meaning "domain of Cærellius". The second part of the name, l'Isle, refers to the river Isle, which flows through the commune.

In Occitan, the commune is called Sarlhac d'Eila.

== History ==
The territory of the commune has been occupied since the Gallo-Roman era.

The oldest known written mention of the location dates back to the 13th century and concerns its church under the name Sanctus Petrus de Sarlhac.

During the Middle Ages (14th century), the parish of Sarliac (Sarlhac) was part of the castellany of Auberoche.

On the Cassini map depicting France between 1756 and 1789, the village is identified by the name "Sarliat". In 1907, the commune of Sarliac took the name Sarliac-sur-l'Isle.

== Population ==
Historical population
Year	Pop.	±% p.a.
1968	414	—
1975	561	+4.44%
1982	730	+3.83%
1990	798	+1.12%
1999	885	+1.16%
2007	1,016	+1.74%
2012	1,061	+0.87%
2017	1,020	−0.79%
2023	1,054	+0.55%
Source: INSEE

== See also ==
- Château de la Bonnetie
- Communes of the Dordogne département
