= Cornille =

- Commune
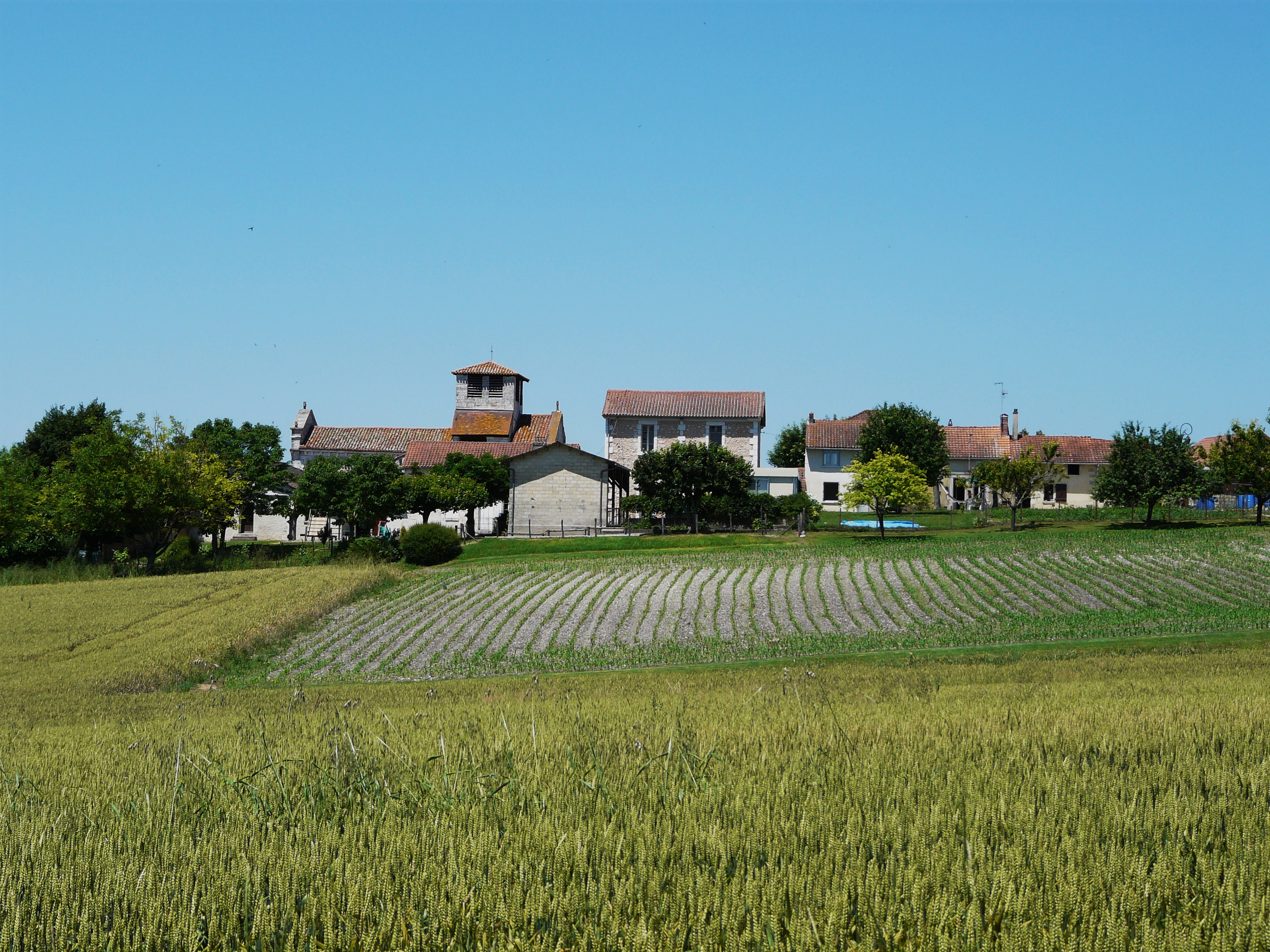
- A general view of Cornille
- Location of Cornille
- Location within France Location within Nouvelle-Aquitaine
- Coordinates: 45°15′07″N 0°47′07″E
- Country: France
- Region: Nouvelle-Aquitaine
- Department: Dordogne
- Arrondissement: Périgueux
- Canton: Trélissac
- Intercommunality: Le Grand Périgueux

Government
  - Mayor (2020–2026): Stéphane Dobbels
- Area^{1}: 13.04 km^{2} (5.03 sq mi)
- Highest elevation: 230 m (750 ft)
- Lowest elevation: 134 m (440 ft)
- Population (2023): 687
  - Density: 52.7/km^{2} (136/sq mi)
- Time zone: UTC+01:00 (CET)
  - Summer (DST): UTC+02:00 (CEST)
- INSEE/Postal code: 24135 /24750
- ^{1} French Land Register data, which excludes lakes, ponds, glaciers > 1 km^{2} (0.386 sq mi or 247 acres) and river estuaries.

Cornille (French pronunciation: [kɔʁnij]; Occitan: Cornilha) is a commune in the Dordogne department in Nouvelle-Aquitaine in southwestern France.

== Population ==
Historical population
Year	Pop.	±% p.a.
1968	275	—
1975	318	+2.10%
1982	445	+4.92%
1990	548	+2.64%
1999	562	+0.28%
2007	655	+1.93%
2012	668	+0.39%
2017	676	+0.24%
2023	687	+0.27%
Source: INSEE

== See also ==
- Communes of the Dordogne department
