= Château de Trigonant =

Château in Nouvelle-Aquitaine, France

Coordinates: 45°12′29″N 0°49′00″E

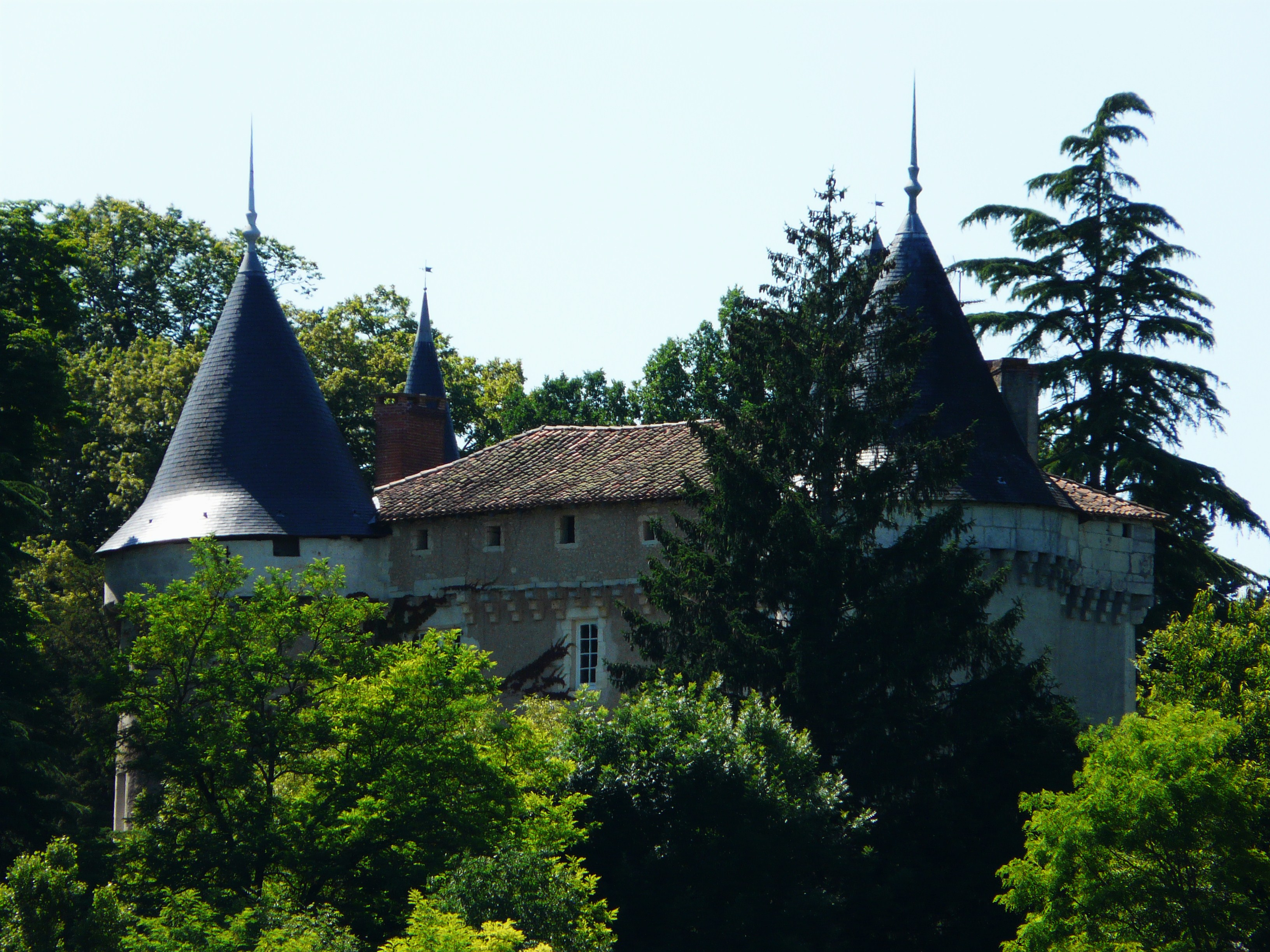
Château de Trigonant

The Château de Trigonant is a château in Antonne-et-Trigonant, Dordogne, Nouvelle-Aquitaine, France.
