= Château-l'Évêque =

Château-l'Évêque Lo Chasteu (Occitan)
- Commune
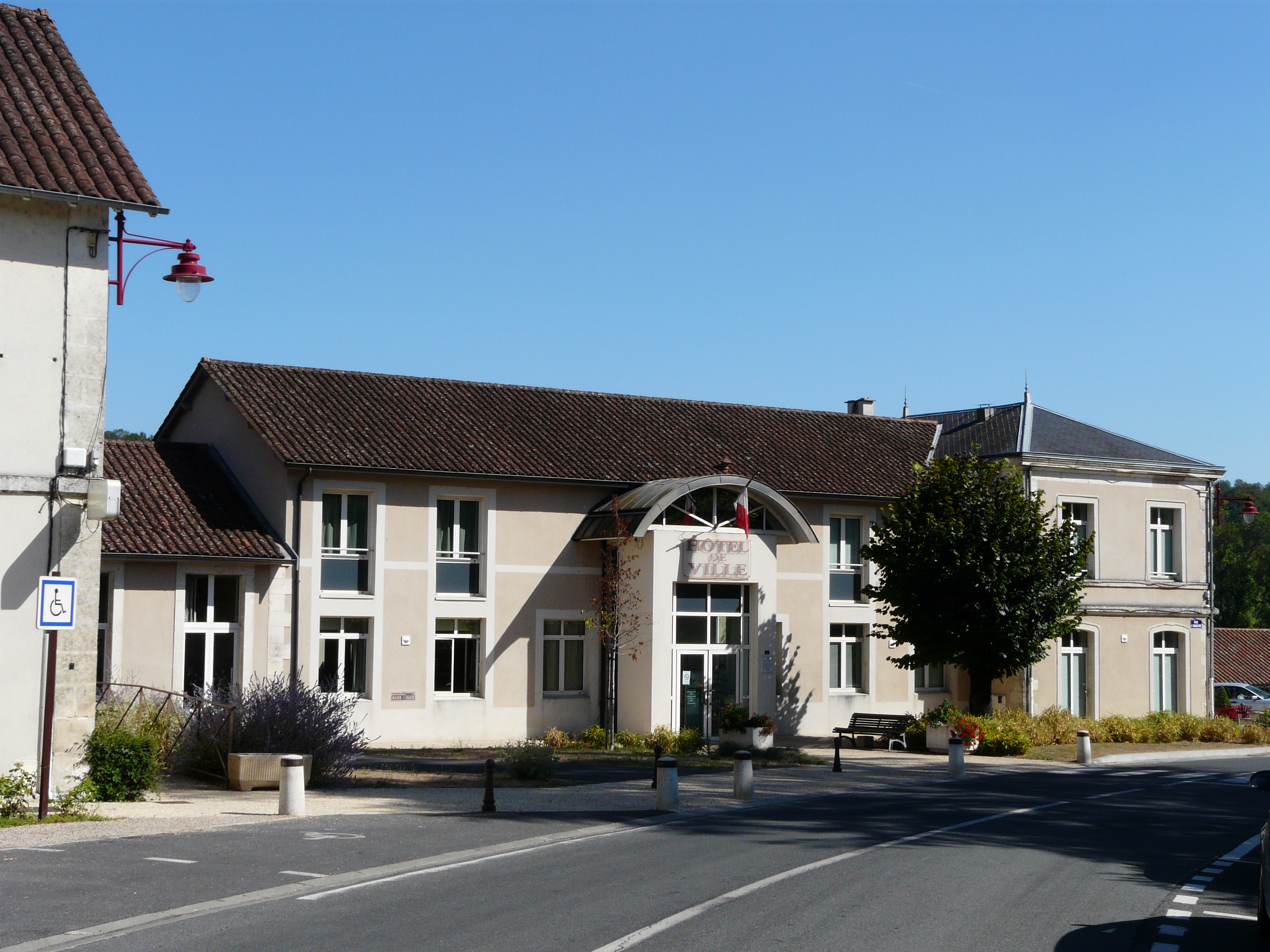
- The town hall in Château-l'Évêque

- Coat of arms
- Location of Château-l'Évêque
- Location within France Location within Nouvelle-Aquitaine
- Coordinates: 45°14′47″N 0°41′11″E
- Country: France
- Region: Nouvelle-Aquitaine
- Department: Dordogne
- Arrondissement: Périgueux
- Canton: Trélissac
- Intercommunality: Le Grand Périgueux

Government
  - Mayor (2020–2026): Alain Marty
- Area^{1}: 35.68 km^{2} (13.78 sq mi)
- Elevation: 103 m (338 ft)
- Highest elevation: 233 m (764 ft)
- Lowest elevation: 92 m (302 ft)
- Population (2023): 2,158
  - Density: 60.48/km^{2} (156.6/sq mi)
- Time zone: UTC+01:00 (CET)
  - Summer (DST): UTC+02:00 (CEST)
- INSEE/Postal code: 24115 /24460
- ^{1} French Land Register data, which excludes lakes, ponds, glaciers > 1 km^{2} (0.386 sq mi or 247 acres) and river estuaries.

Château-l'Évêque (French: [ʃɑto levɛːk]; Limousin: Lo Chasteu) is a commune in the Dordogne department in Nouvelle-Aquitaine in southwestern France. Château-l'Évêque station has rail connections to Bordeaux, Périgueux and Limoges.

== Population ==
Historical population

Year	Pop.	±% p.a.
1793	1,462	—
1800	1,481	+0.18%
1806	1,510	+0.32%
1821	1,509	−0.00%
1831	1,590	+0.52%
1836	1,610	+0.25%
1841	1,360	−3.32%
1846	1,566	+2.86%
1851	1,605	+0.49%
1856	1,557	−0.61%
1861	1,553	−0.05%
1866	1,570	+0.22%
1872	1,544	−0.28%
1876	1,515	−0.47%
1881	1,598	+1.07%
1886	1,578	−0.25%
1891	1,582	+0.05%
1896	1,563	−0.24%
1901	1,491	−0.94%

Year	Pop.	±% p.a.
1906	1,372	−1.65%
1911	1,377	+0.07%
1921	1,265	−0.84%
1926	1,221	−0.71%
1931	1,216	−0.08%
1936	1,211	−0.08%
1946	1,130	−0.69%
1954	1,186	+0.61%
1962	1,191	+0.05%
1968	1,173	−0.25%
1975	1,235	+0.74%
1982	1,378	+1.58%
1990	1,701	+2.67%
1999	1,760	+0.38%
2007	1,959	+1.35%
2012	2,109	+1.49%
2017	2,170	+0.57%
2023	2,158	−0.09%

Source: EHESS and INSEE (1968–2023)

== Castle ==
The castle of Chateau-L'Eveque was built in the 14th century by the bishop of Périgueux, and was partly destroyed and restored in the 15th and 16th centuries. The park and castle are open to visitors.

== See also ==
- Communes of the Dordogne department
