= Agonac station =

Railway station in Agonac, France

Coordinates: 45°17′11″N 0°44′55″E

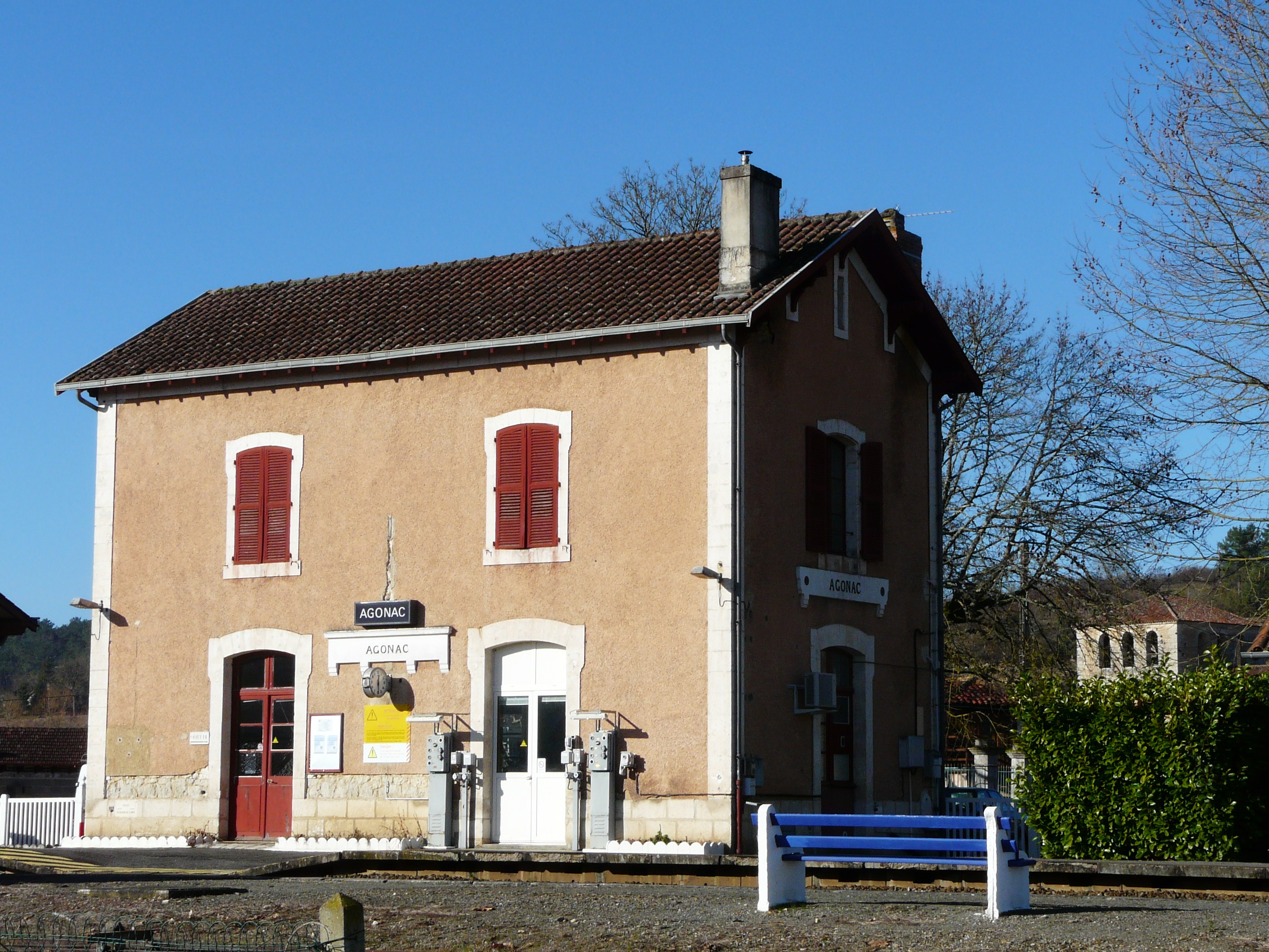
Agonac station

Agonac is a railway station in Agonac, Nouvelle-Aquitaine, France. The station is located on the Limoges-Bénédictins - Périgueux railway line. The station is served by TER (local) services operated by SNCF.

== Train services ==
The following services currently call at Agonac:

- local service (TER Nouvelle-Aquitaine) Limoges - Thiviers - Périgueux - Bordeaux

Preceding station	TER Nouvelle-Aquitaine	Following station
Château-l'Évêque towards Bordeaux	31	Négrondes towards Limoges
