= Antonne-et-Trigonant =

- Commune
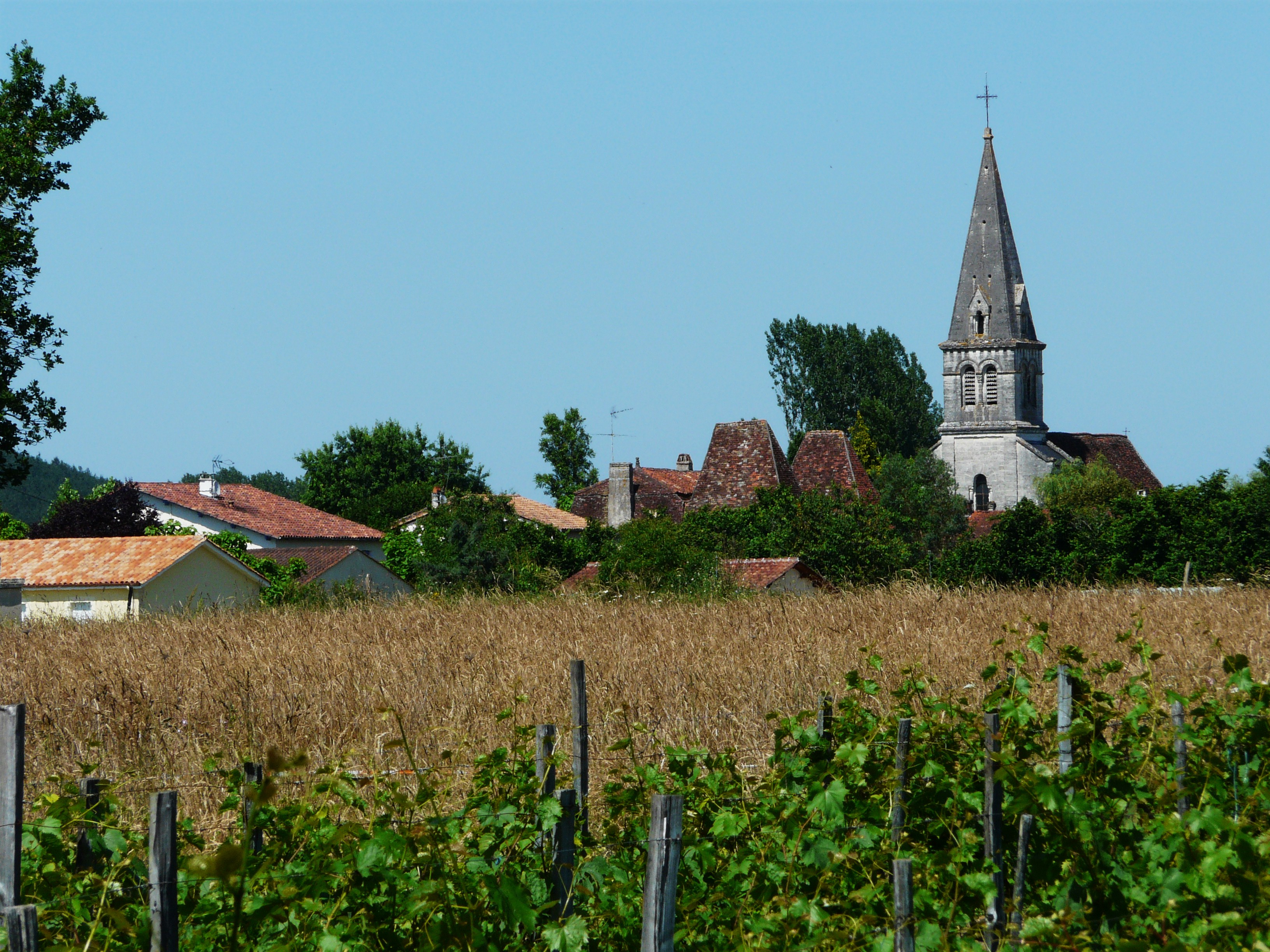
- A general view of Antonne
- Location of Antonne-et-Trigonant
- Location within France Location within Nouvelle-Aquitaine
- Coordinates: 45°12′48″N 0°49′54″E
- Country: France
- Region: Nouvelle-Aquitaine
- Department: Dordogne
- Arrondissement: Périgueux
- Canton: Trélissac
- Intercommunality: Le Grand Périgueux

Government
  - Mayor (2020–2026): Daniel Le Mao
- Area^{1}: 20.23 km^{2} (7.81 sq mi)
- Elevation: 106 m (348 ft)
- Highest elevation: 217 m (712 ft)
- Lowest elevation: 89 m (292 ft)
- Population (2023): 1,185
  - Density: 58.58/km^{2} (151.7/sq mi)
- Time zone: UTC+01:00 (CET)
  - Summer (DST): UTC+02:00 (CEST)
- INSEE/Postal code: 24011 /24420
- ^{1} French Land Register data, which excludes lakes, ponds, glaciers > 1 km^{2} (0.386 sq mi or 247 acres) and river estuaries.

Antonne-et-Trigonant (French pronunciation: [ɑ̃tɔn e tʁiɡɔnɑ̃]; Occitan: Antona e Trigonam) is a commune in the Dordogne department in Nouvelle-Aquitaine in southwestern France.

== Population ==
Historical population
Year	Pop.	±% p.a.
1968	862	—
1975	917	+0.89%
1982	961	+0.67%
1990	1,050	+1.11%
1999	1,079	+0.30%
2007	1,200	+1.34%
2012	1,225	+0.41%
2017	1,283	+0.93%
2023	1,185	−1.32%
Source: INSEE

== Sights and monuments ==
- Saint Martin church
- Château de Trigonant, 15th-16th centuries, listed monument historique
- Château des Bories, 15th-16th centuries, classified monument historique, privately owned, open to the public in July and August
- Pigeon loft at Bories
- Château de Lanmary, 15th-18th centuries, now a convalescence centre
- Maison forte du Pot, fortified house, 15th century
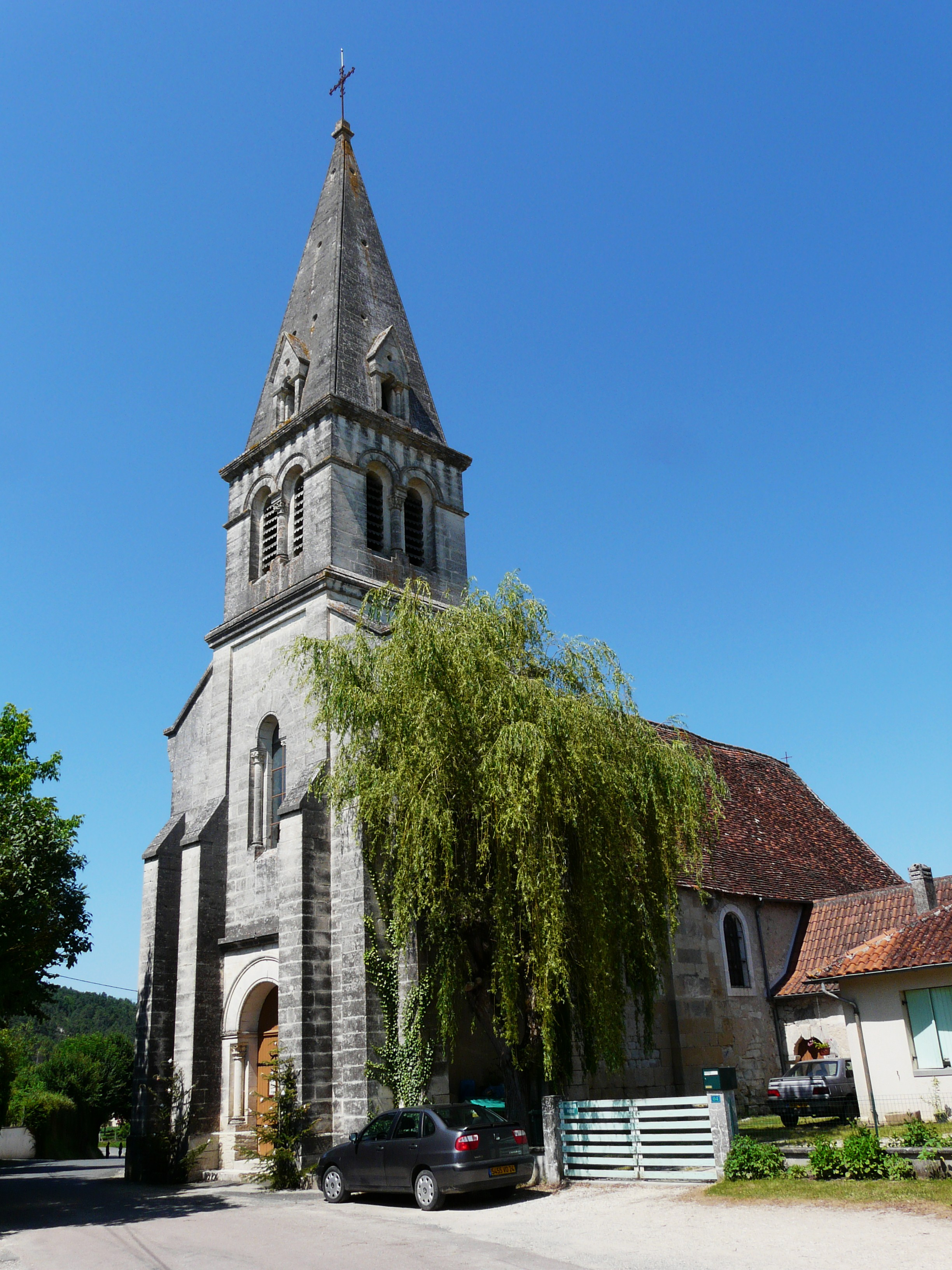
Saint Martin church

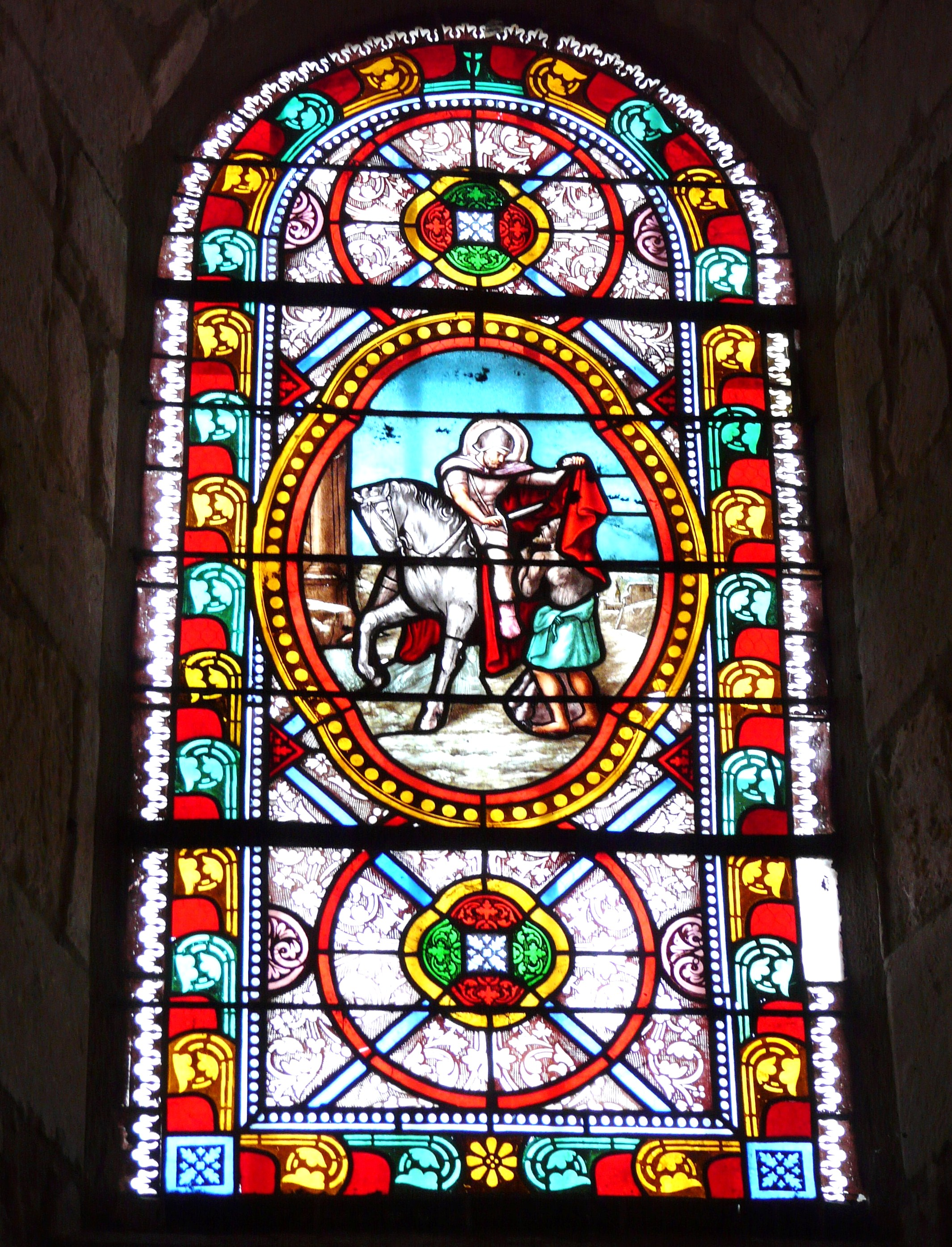
Stained glass of
Saint Martin

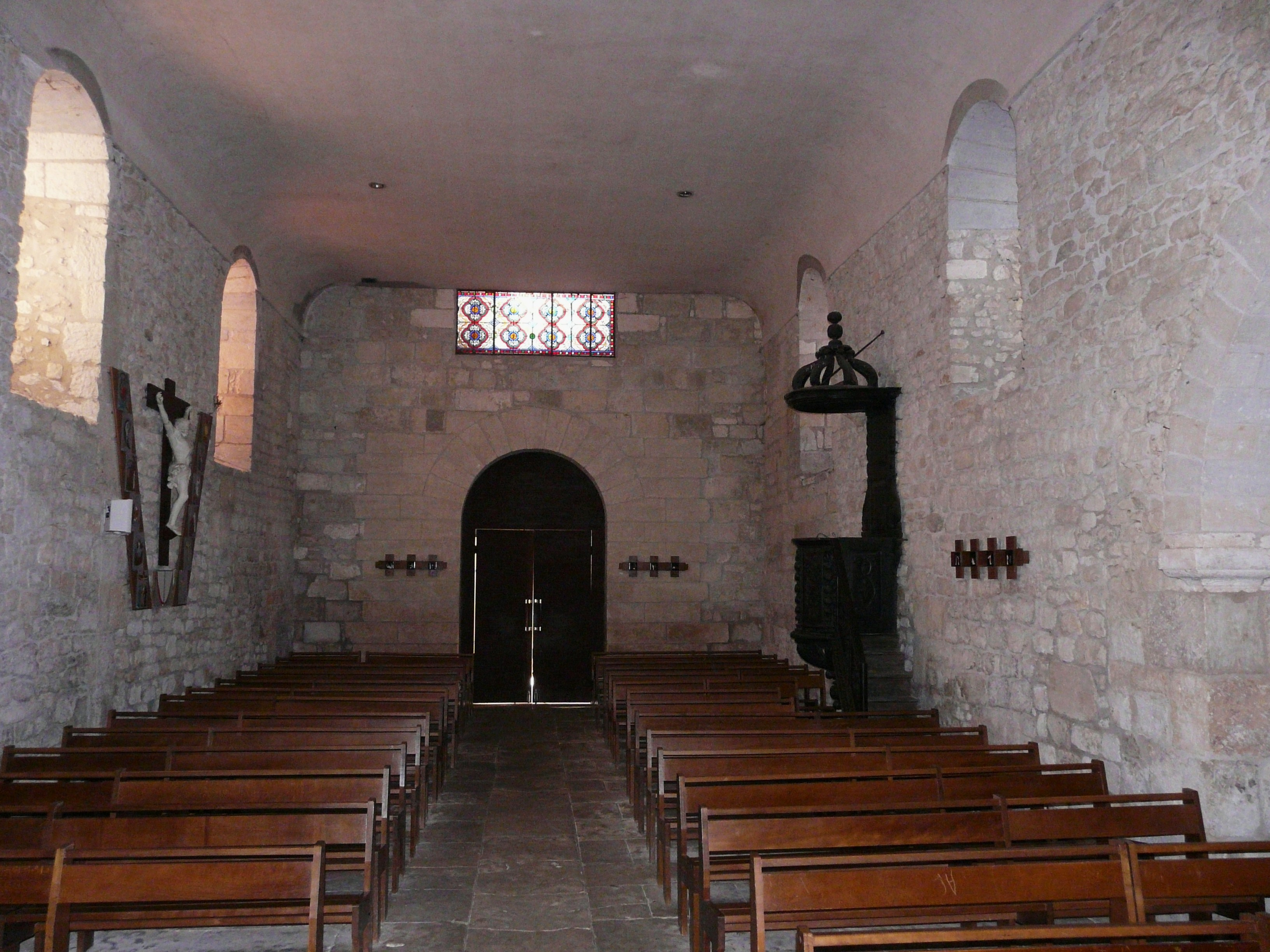
Interior of the church

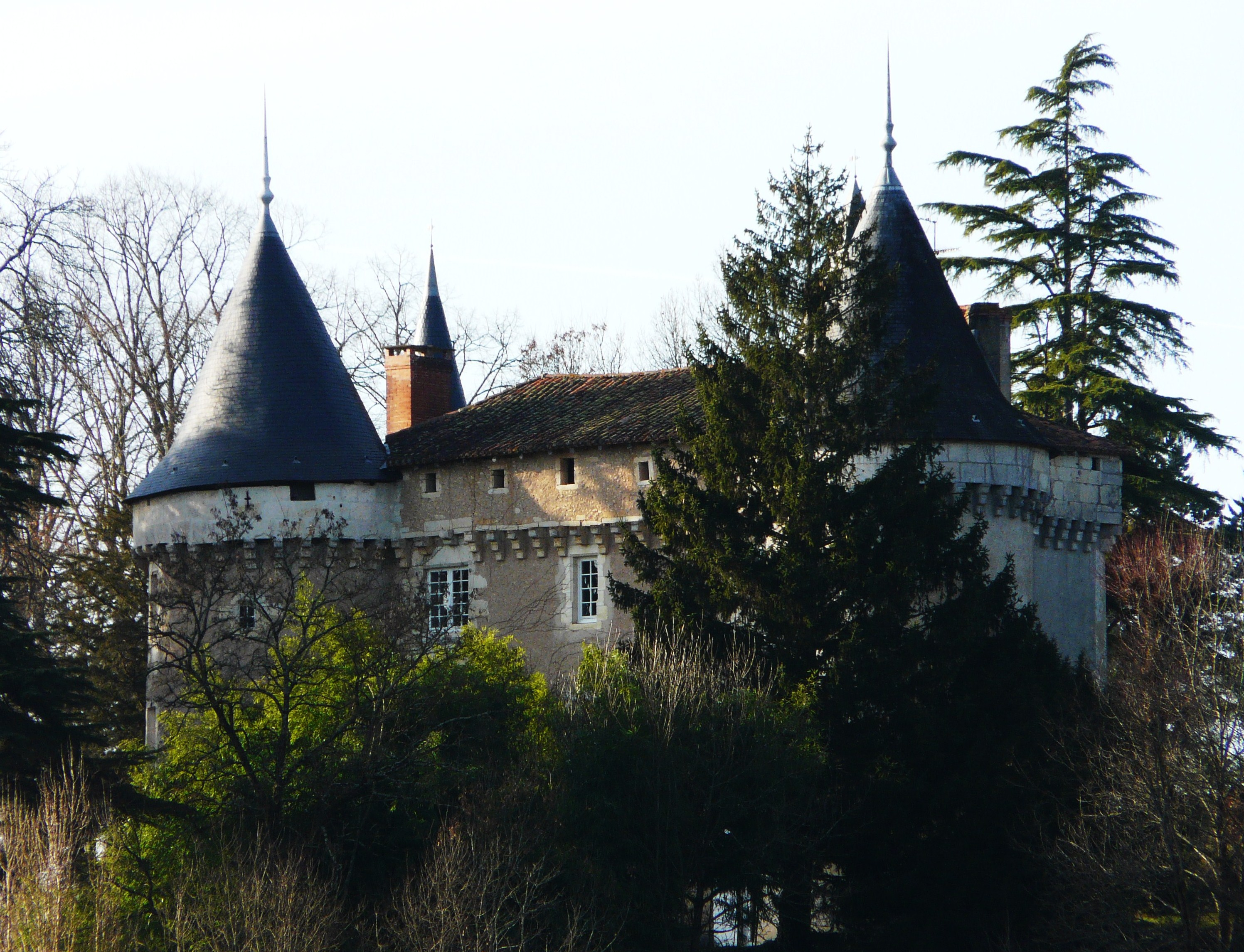
Château de Trigonant
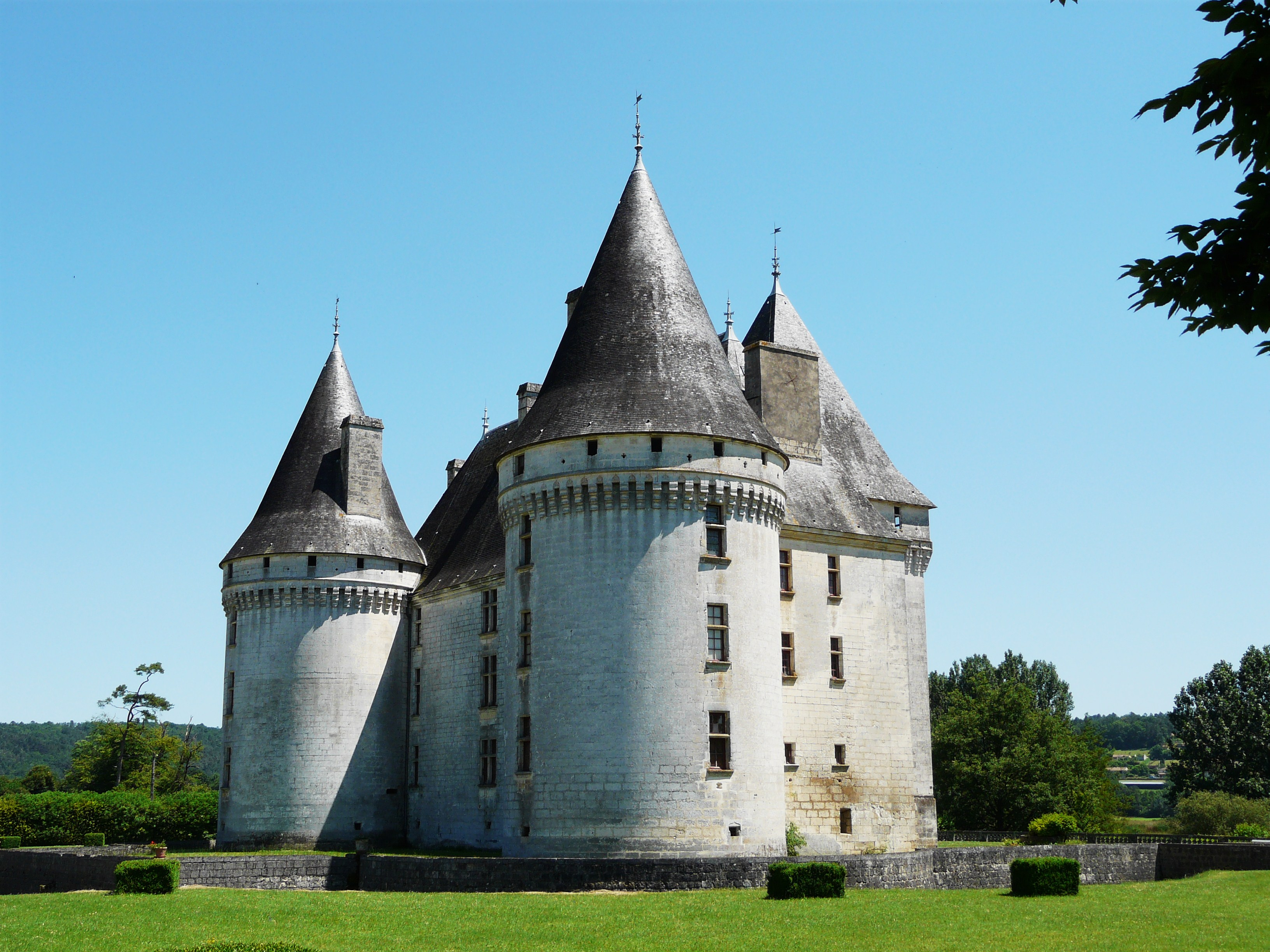
Château des Bories

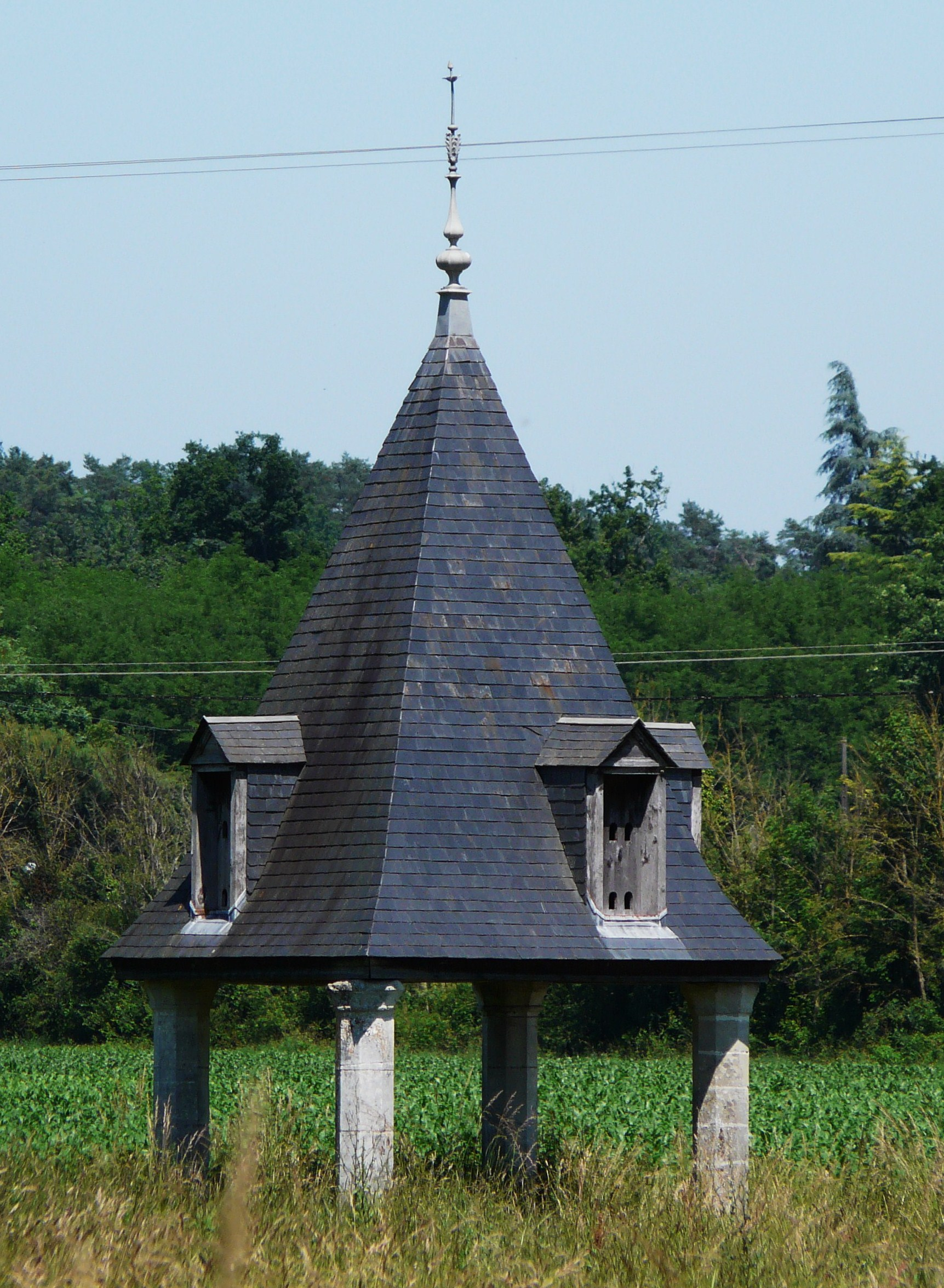
Pigeon loft at Bories

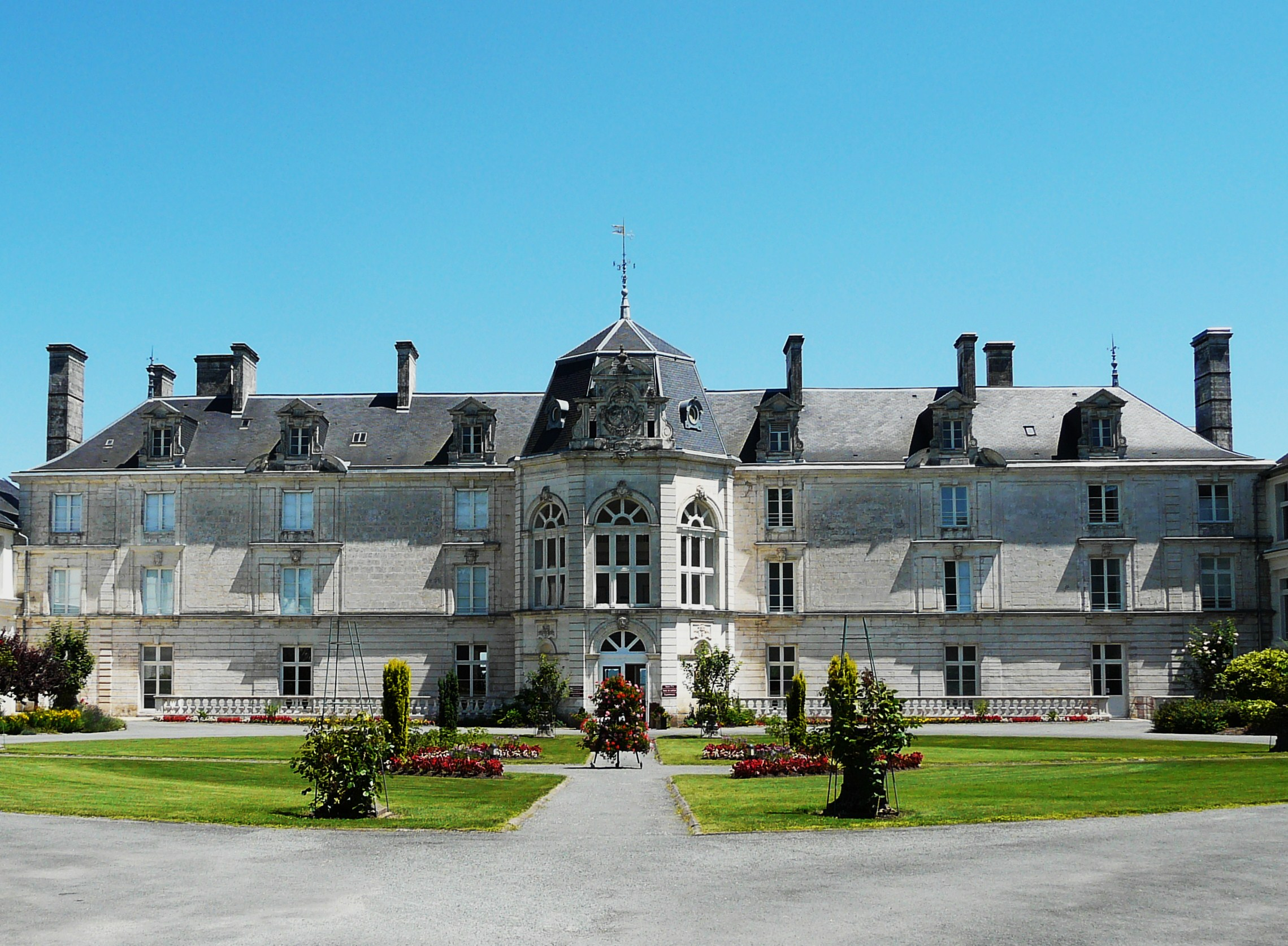
Château de Lanmary

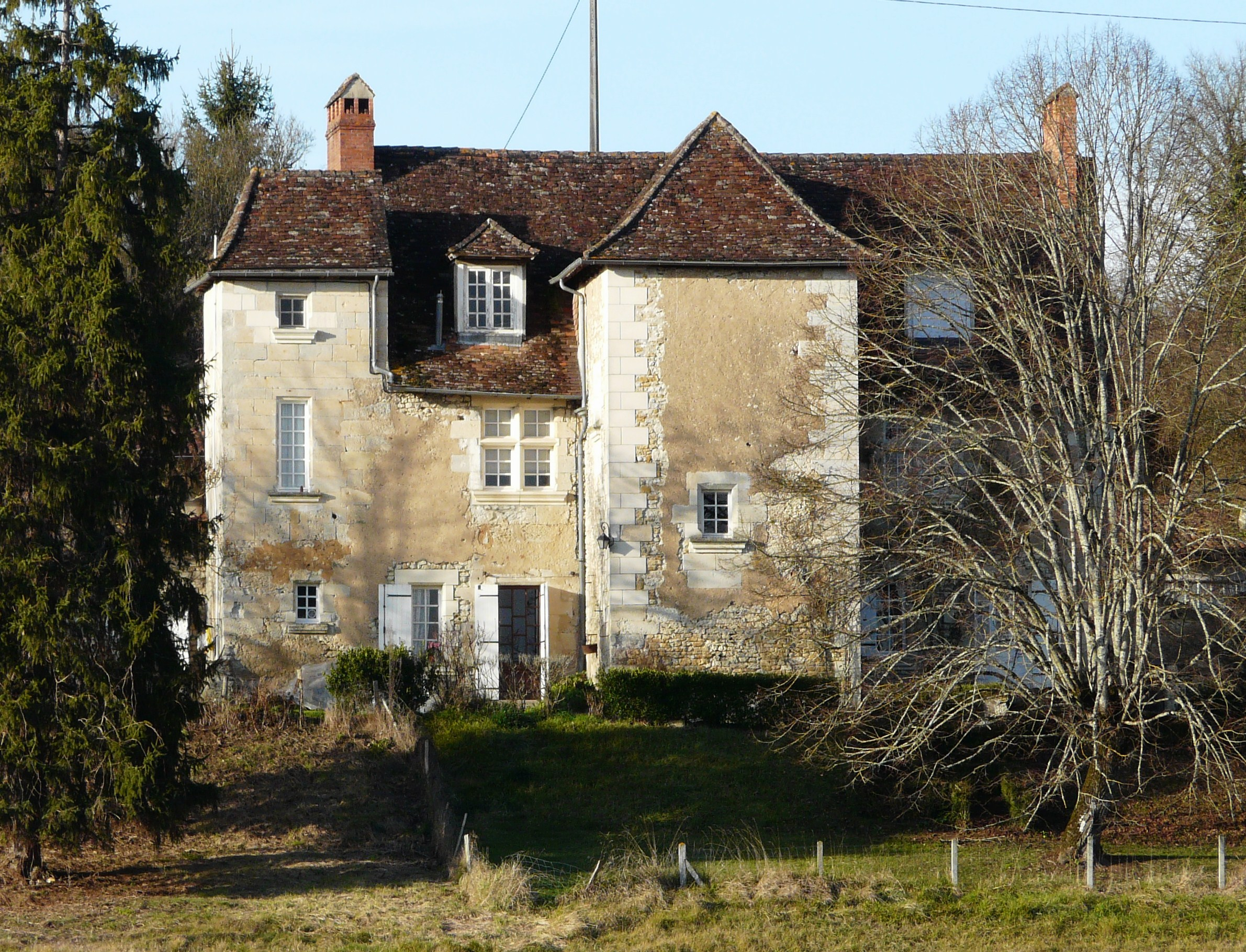
La maison forte du Pot

== See also ==
- Communes of the Dordogne département
