= Château de Lanmary =

Château in France

Coordinates: 45°14′27″N 0°48′56″E

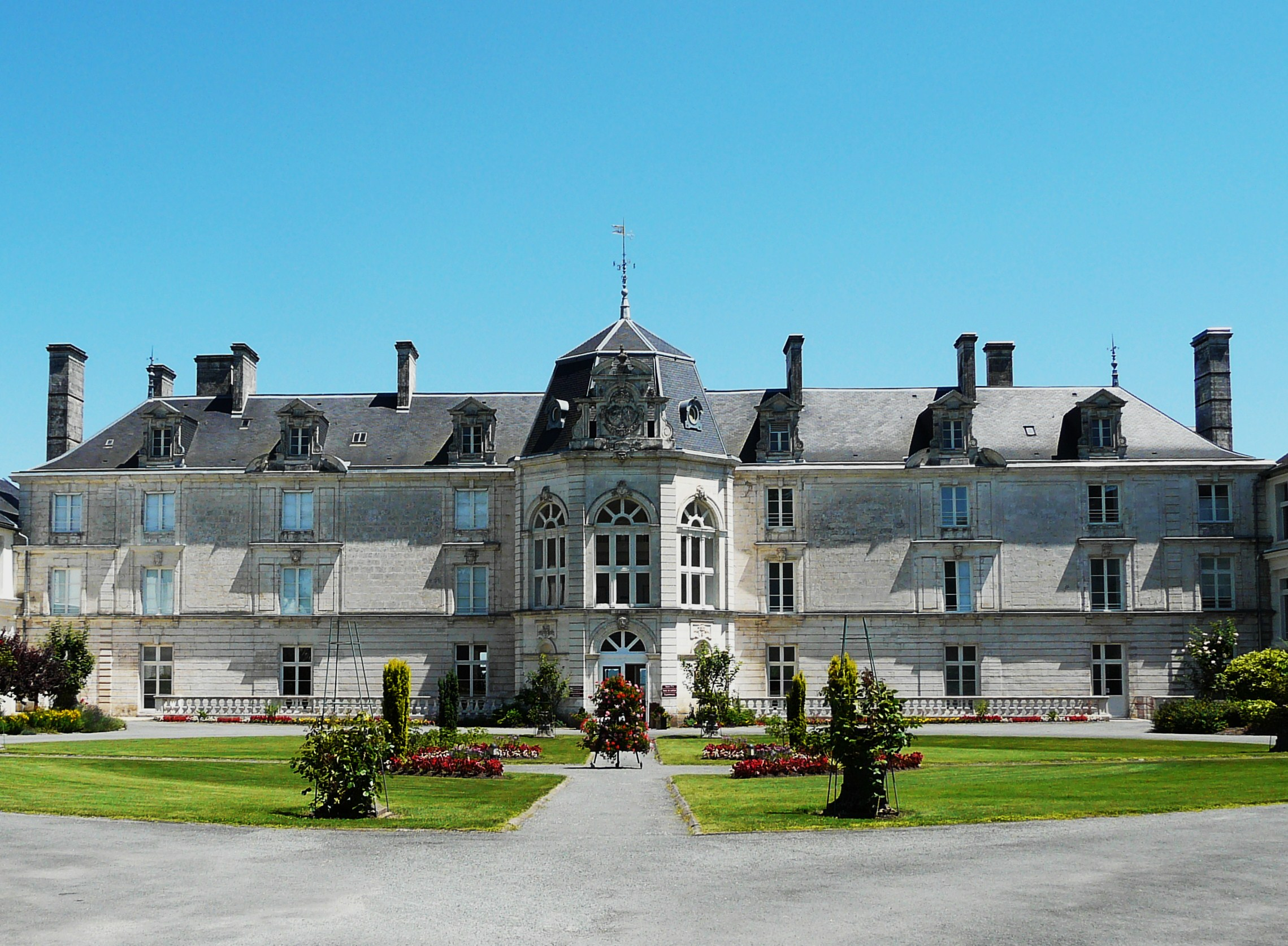

The Château de Lanmary is a château in Antonne-et-Trigonant, Dordogne, Nouvelle-Aquitaine, France, constructed around four 15th-century towers.

== Gallery ==
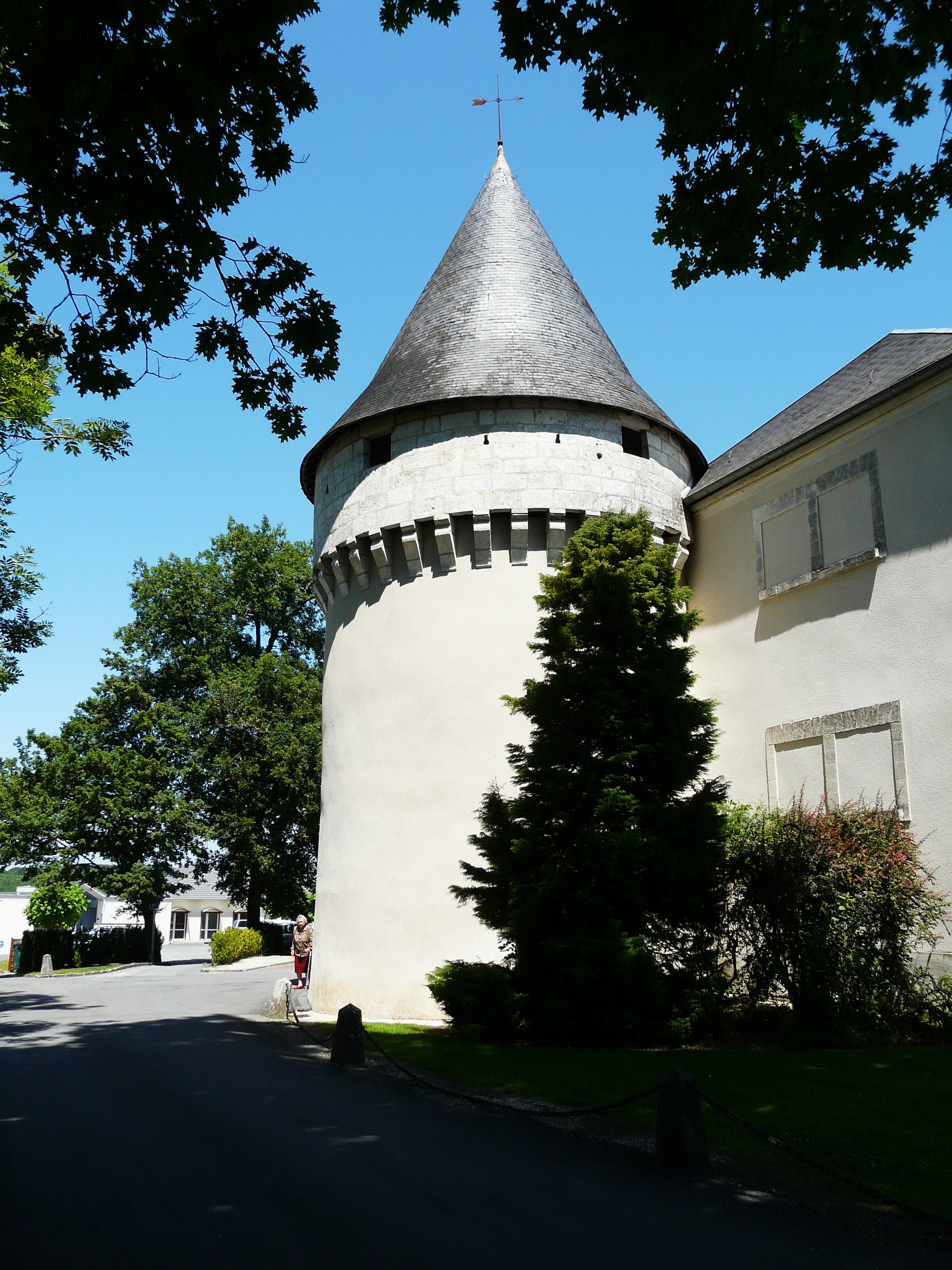
The north west tower

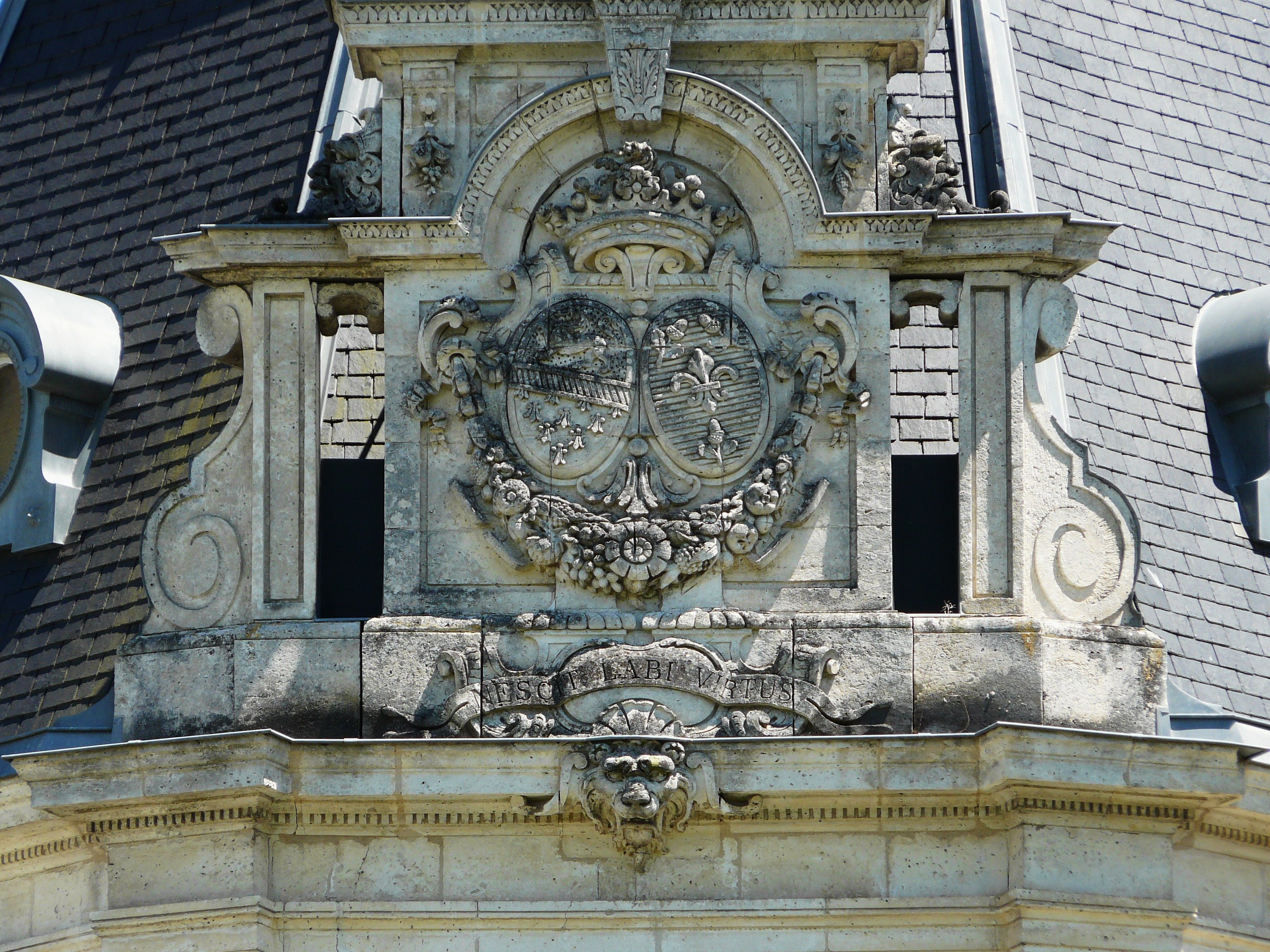
The armorial pediment on the logis

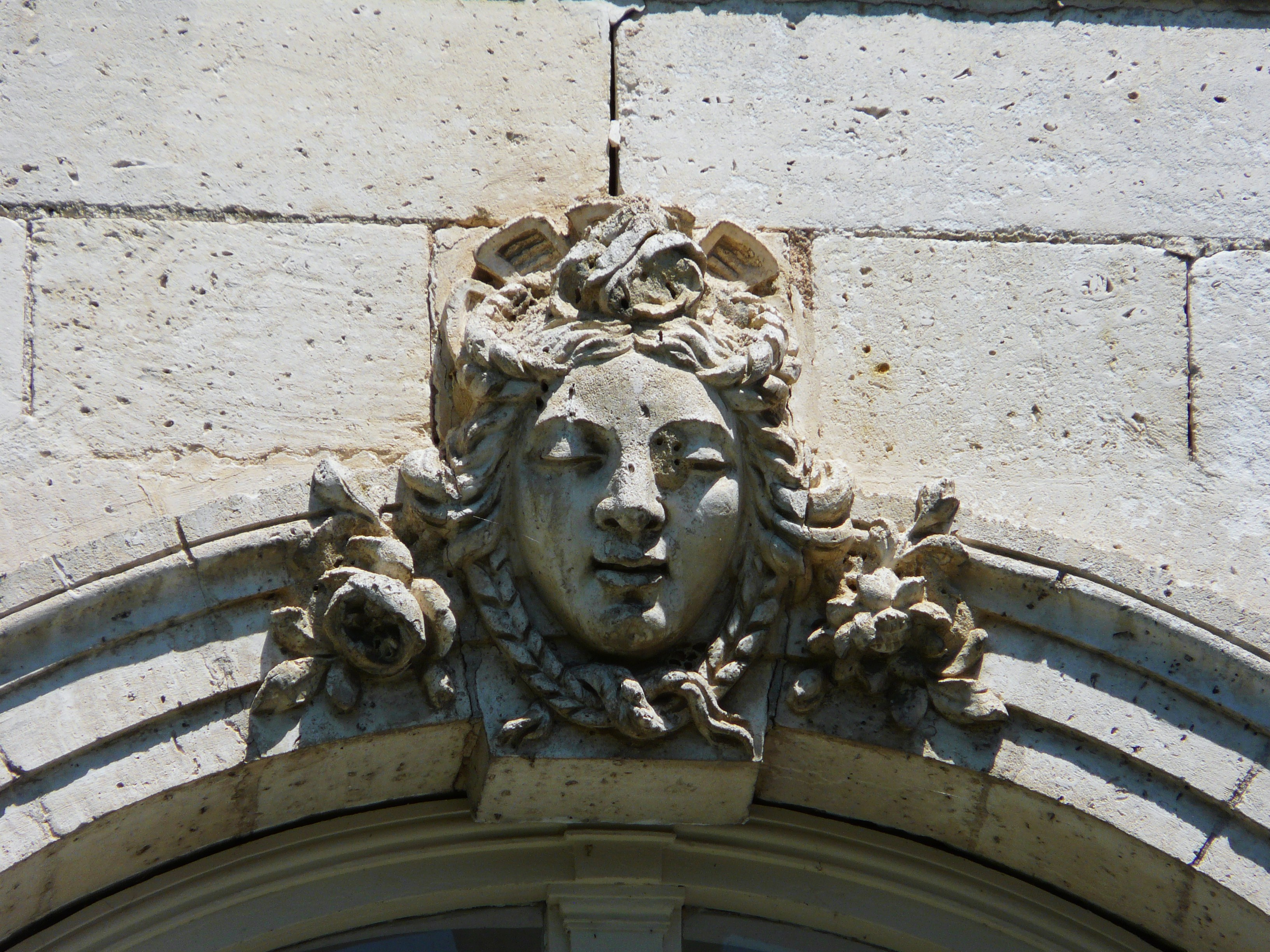
One of six mascarons which adorn the logis

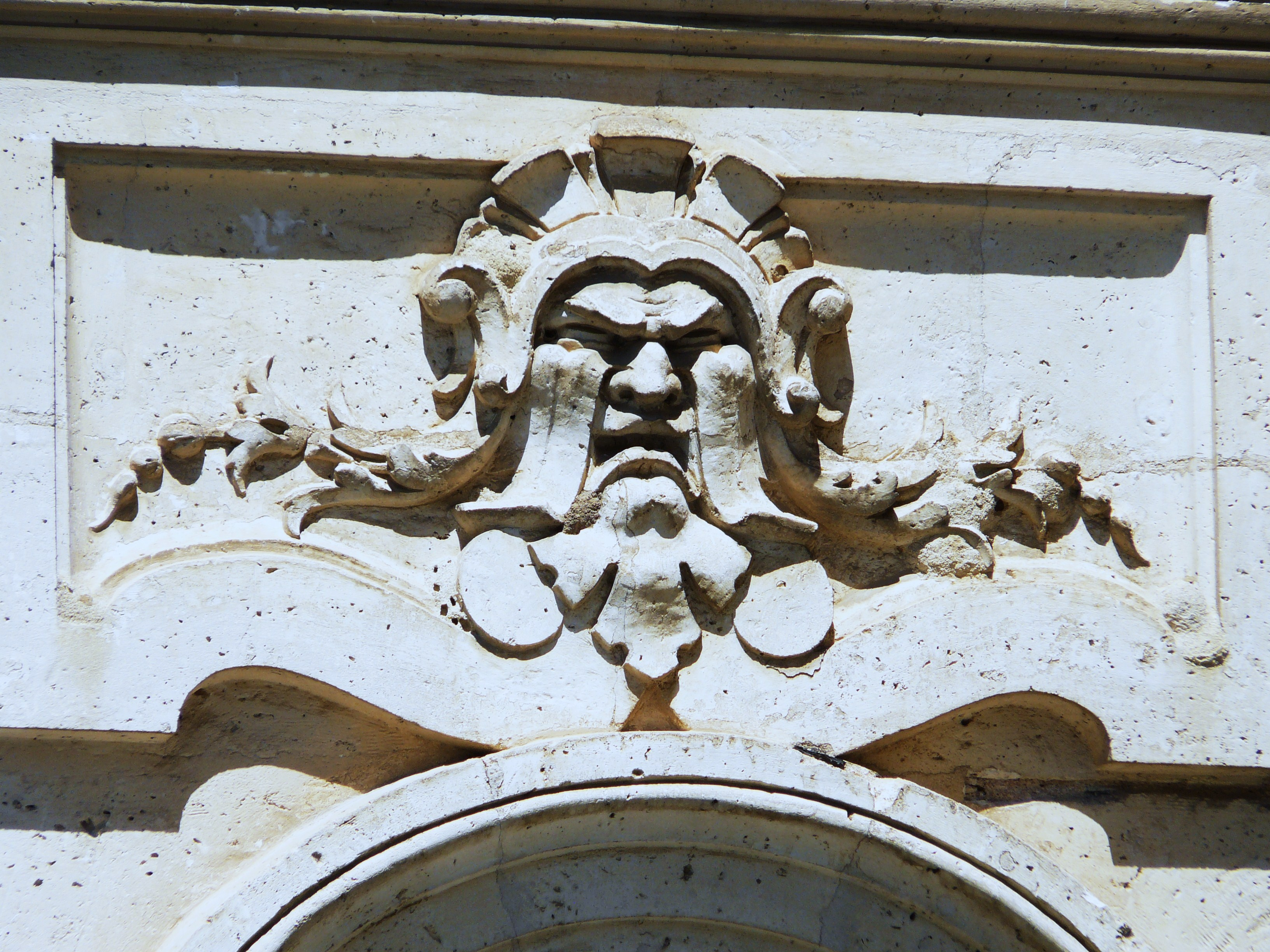
Another mascaron

== See also ==
- List of castles in France
