= Château de la Bonnetie =

Castle in France

Coordinates: 45°14′27″N 0°52′46″E

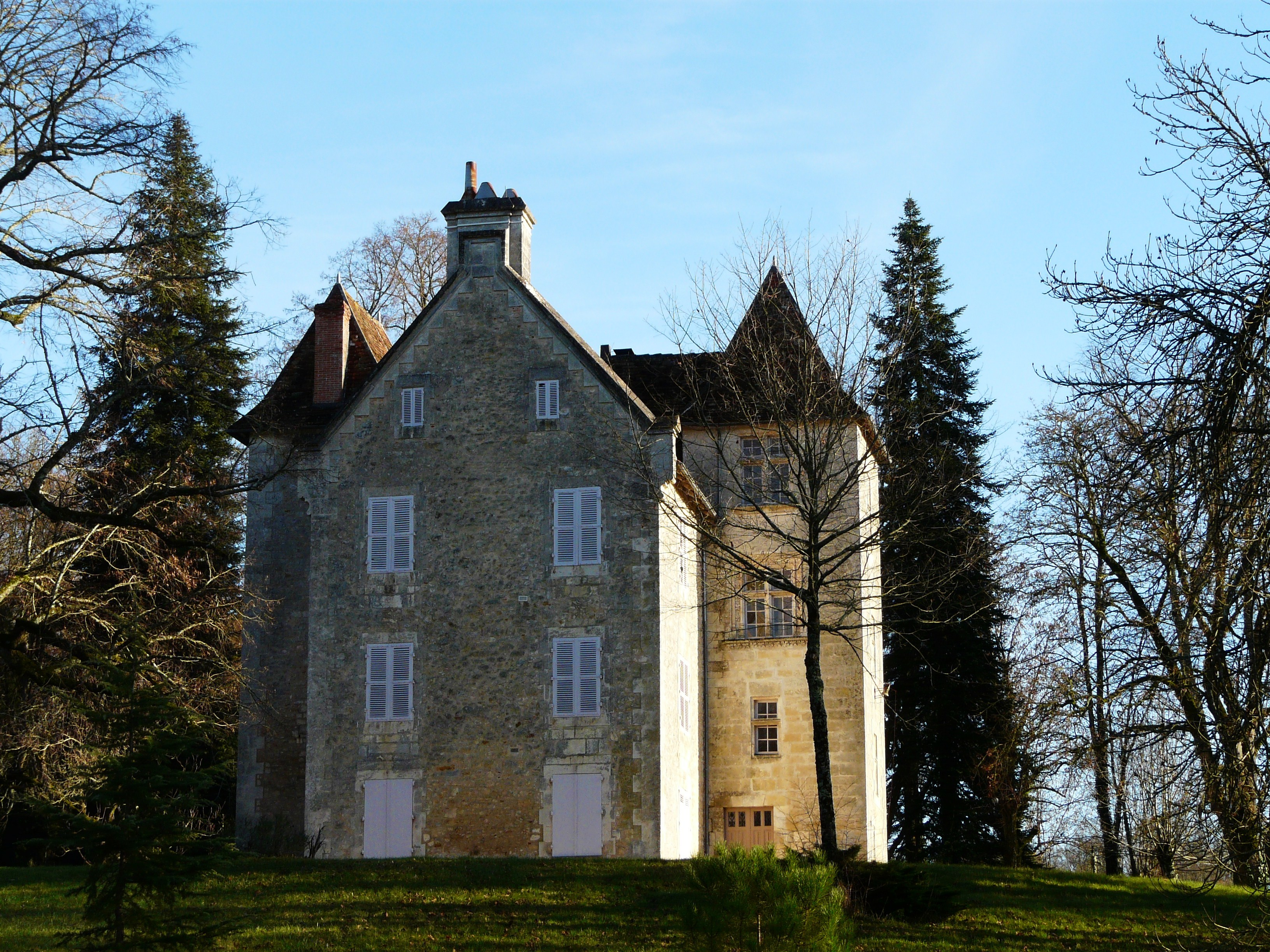

The Château de la Bonnetie is a château in the commune of Sarliac-sur-l'Isle in Dordogne, Nouvelle-Aquitaine, France.

The Château de la Bonnetie is located on the left bank of the Isle river, east-northeast of the town of Sarliac-sur-l'Isle. It consists of a house flanked by two square turrets. To the south, a 17th-century dovecote has been preserved.

It has been on the list of monuments historiques since 1947 because of one of its turrets.
