= Canton of Trélissac =

Coordinates: 45.20°N 0.78°E

The canton of Trélissac is an administrative division of the Dordogne department, southwestern France. It was created at the French canton reorganisation which came into effect in March 2015. Its seat is in Trélissac.

It consists of the following communes:

1. Agonac
2. Antonne-et-Trigonant
3. Champcevinel
4. Château-l'Évêque
5. Cornille
6. Escoire
7. Sarliac-sur-l'Isle
8. Trélissac
