= Agonac =

- Commune
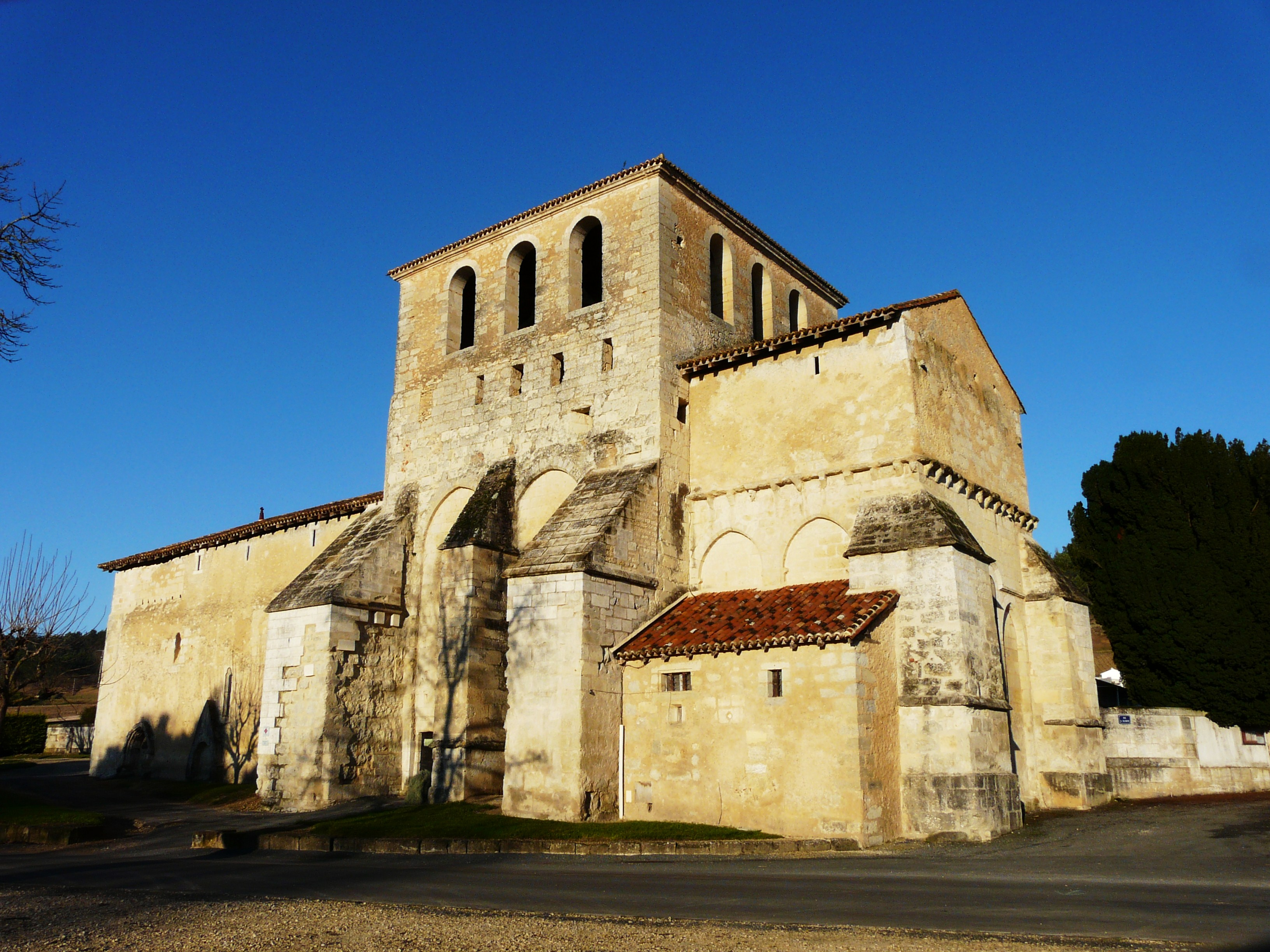
- The church in Agonac
- Location of Agonac
- Location within France Location within Nouvelle-Aquitaine
- Coordinates: 45°17′36″N 0°45′03″E
- Country: France
- Region: Nouvelle-Aquitaine
- Department: Dordogne
- Arrondissement: Périgueux
- Canton: Trélissac
- Intercommunality: Le Grand Périgueux

Government
  - Mayor (2020–2026): Christelle Boucaud
- Area^{1}: 37.22 km^{2} (14.37 sq mi)
- Highest elevation: 224 m (735 ft)
- Lowest elevation: 110 m (360 ft)
- Population (2023): 1,765
  - Density: 47.42/km^{2} (122.8/sq mi)
- Time zone: UTC+01:00 (CET)
  - Summer (DST): UTC+02:00 (CEST)
- INSEE/Postal code: 24002 /24460
- ^{1} French Land Register data, which excludes lakes, ponds, glaciers > 1 km^{2} (0.386 sq mi or 247 acres) and river estuaries.

Agonac (French pronunciation: [aɡɔnak]) is a commune in the Dordogne department in Nouvelle-Aquitaine in southwestern France. It is situated on the small river Beauronne, 12 km (7.5 mi) north of Périgueux. Agonac station has rail connections to Bordeaux, Périgueux and Limoges.

== Population ==
Historical population
| Year | Pop. | ±% p.a. |
|---|---|---|
| 1968 | 1,162 | — |
| 1975 | 1,027 | −1.75% |
| 1982 | 1,059 | +0.44% |
| 1990 | 1,342 | +3.00% |
| 1999 | 1,451 | +0.87% |
| 2007 | 1,612 | +1.32% |
| 2012 | 1,690 | +0.95% |
| 2017 | 1,761 | +0.83% |
| 2023 | 1,765 | +0.04% |
Source: INSEE

== History ==
The settlements "Borie-Vieille" and "Les Cadagnes" have yielded prehistoric remains.

In the 11th century, the village was built on a hill controlling valleys with difficult access. Agonac was one of four fourtresses and protected the area from the Norman invasions.

== See also ==
- Communes of the Dordogne department
