= Ponteyraud =

Commune in Dordogne, France

- Part of La Jemaye-Ponteyraud
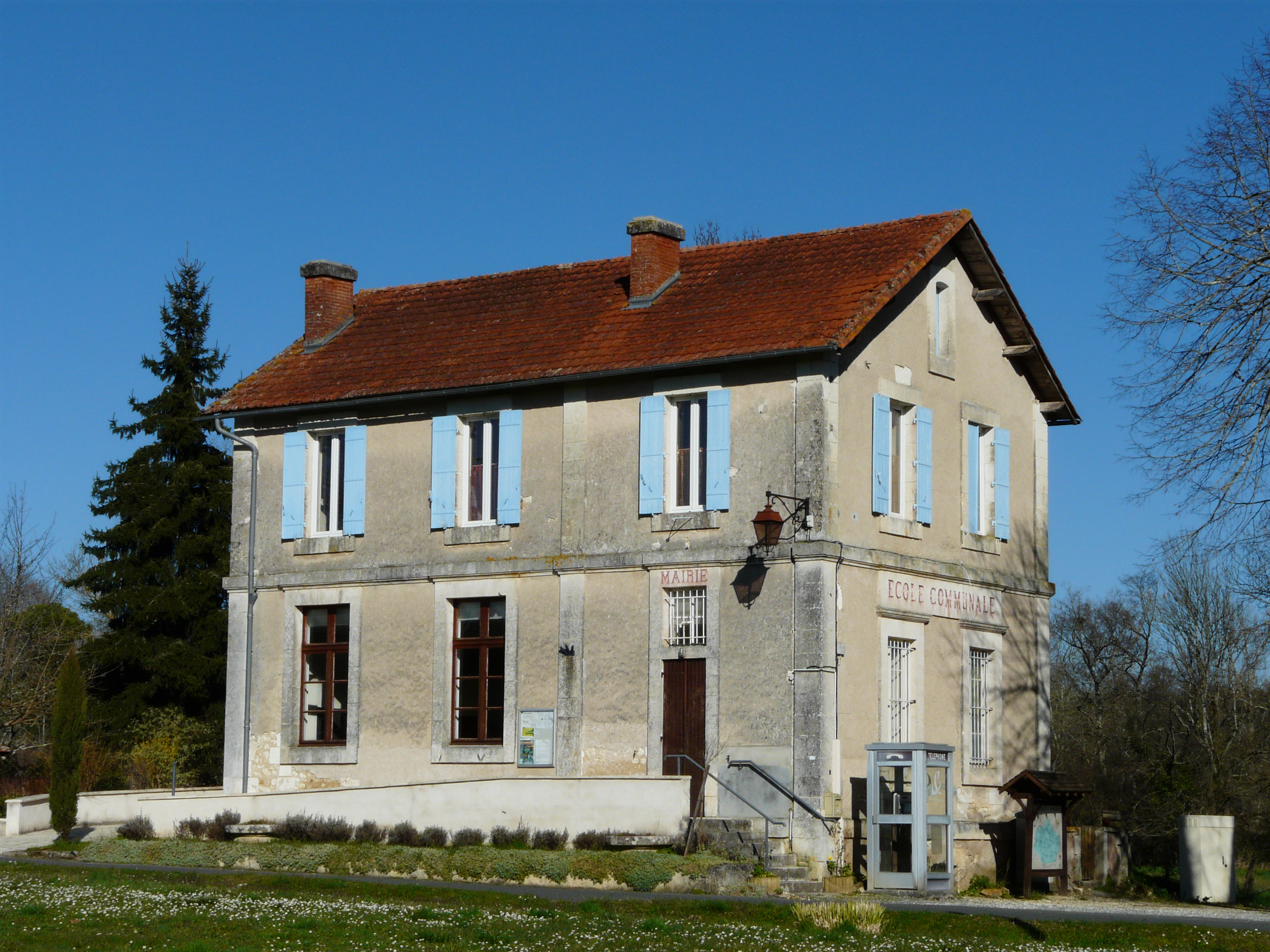
- Town hall
- Location of Ponteyraud
- Location within France Location within Nouvelle-Aquitaine
- Coordinates: 45°11′39″N 0°14′35″E
- Country: France
- Region: Nouvelle-Aquitaine
- Department: Dordogne
- Arrondissement: Périgueux
- Canton: Ribérac
- Commune: La Jemaye-Ponteyraud
- Area^{1}: 4.19 km^{2} (1.62 sq mi)
- Elevation: 60 m (200 ft)
- Highest elevation: 113 m (371 ft)
- Lowest elevation: 49 m (161 ft)
- Population (2022): 41
  - Density: 9.8/km^{2} (25/sq mi)
- Time zone: UTC+01:00 (CET)
  - Summer (DST): UTC+02:00 (CEST)
- Postal code: 24410
- ^{1} French Land Register data, which excludes lakes, ponds, glaciers > 1 km^{2} (0.386 sq mi or 247 acres) and river estuaries.

Ponteyraud (French pronunciation: [pɔ̃teʁo]; Occitan: Pontairaud) is a former commune in the Dordogne department in Nouvelle-Aquitaine in southwestern France. On 1 January 2017, it was merged into the new commune La Jemaye-Ponteyraud.

== See also ==
- Communes of the Dordogne department
