= La Jemaye-Ponteyraud =

- Commune
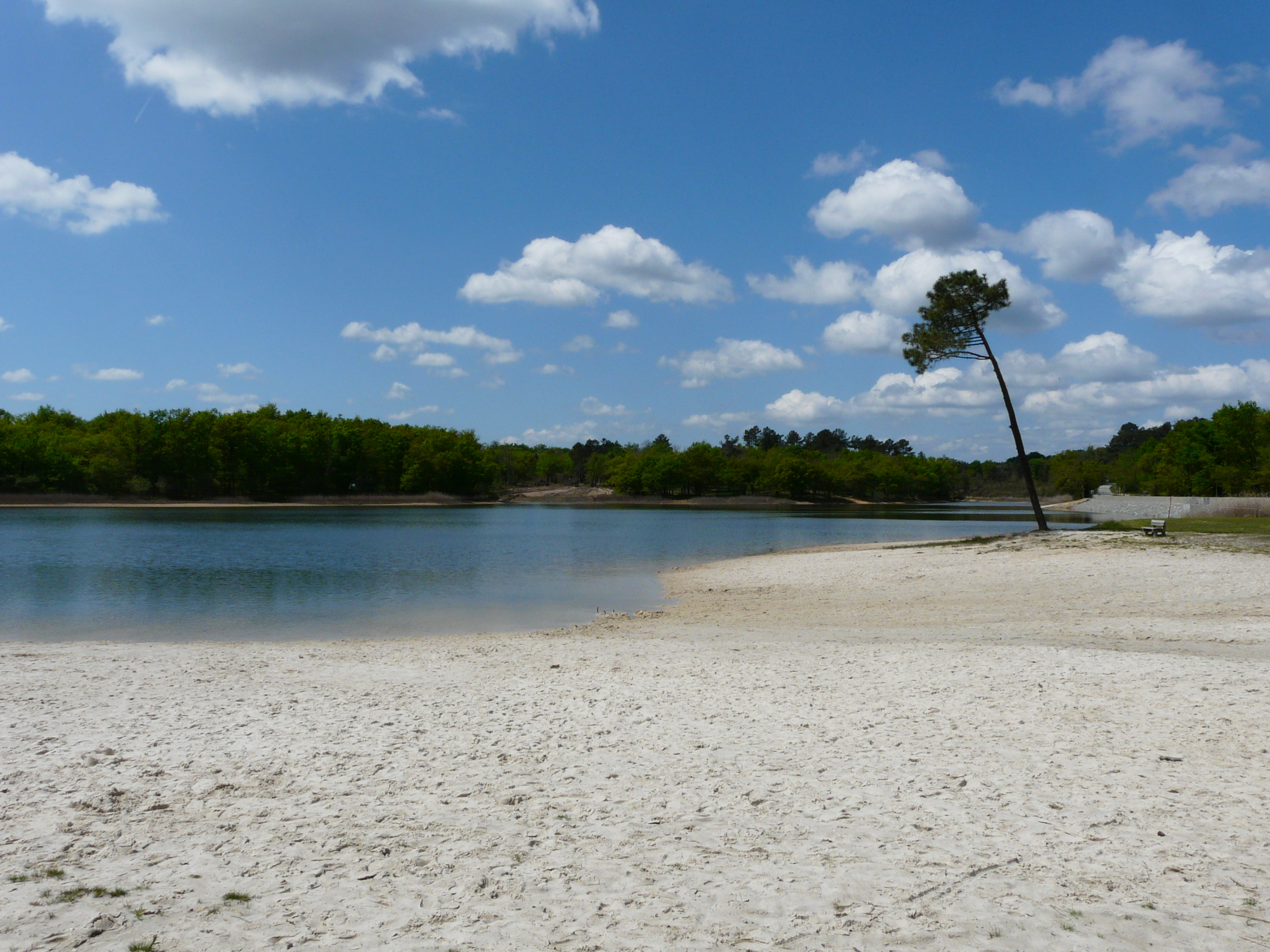
- The lake in La Jemaye
- Location of La Jemaye-Ponteyraud
- Location within France Location within Nouvelle-Aquitaine
- Coordinates: 45°10′12″N 0°15′25″E
- Country: France
- Region: Nouvelle-Aquitaine
- Department: Dordogne
- Arrondissement: Périgueux
- Canton: Ribérac
- Intercommunality: Périgord Ribéracois

Government
  - Mayor (2020–2026): Jean-Marcel Beau
- Area^{1}: 33.31 km^{2} (12.86 sq mi)
- Population (2023): 146
  - Density: 4.38/km^{2} (11.4/sq mi)
- Time zone: UTC+01:00 (CET)
  - Summer (DST): UTC+02:00 (CEST)
- INSEE/Postal code: 24216 /24410
- ^{1} French Land Register data, which excludes lakes, ponds, glaciers > 1 km^{2} (0.386 sq mi or 247 acres) and river estuaries.

La Jemaye-Ponteyraud (French pronunciation: [la ʒəmaj pɔ̃teʁo]; Occitan: La Jamaia e Pontairaud) is a commune in the department of Dordogne, southwestern France. The municipality was established on 1 January 2017 by merger of the former communes of La Jemaye (the seat) and Ponteyraud.

== See also ==
- Communes of the Dordogne department
