= La Jemaye =

Commune in Dordogne, France

- Part of La Jemaye-Ponteyraud
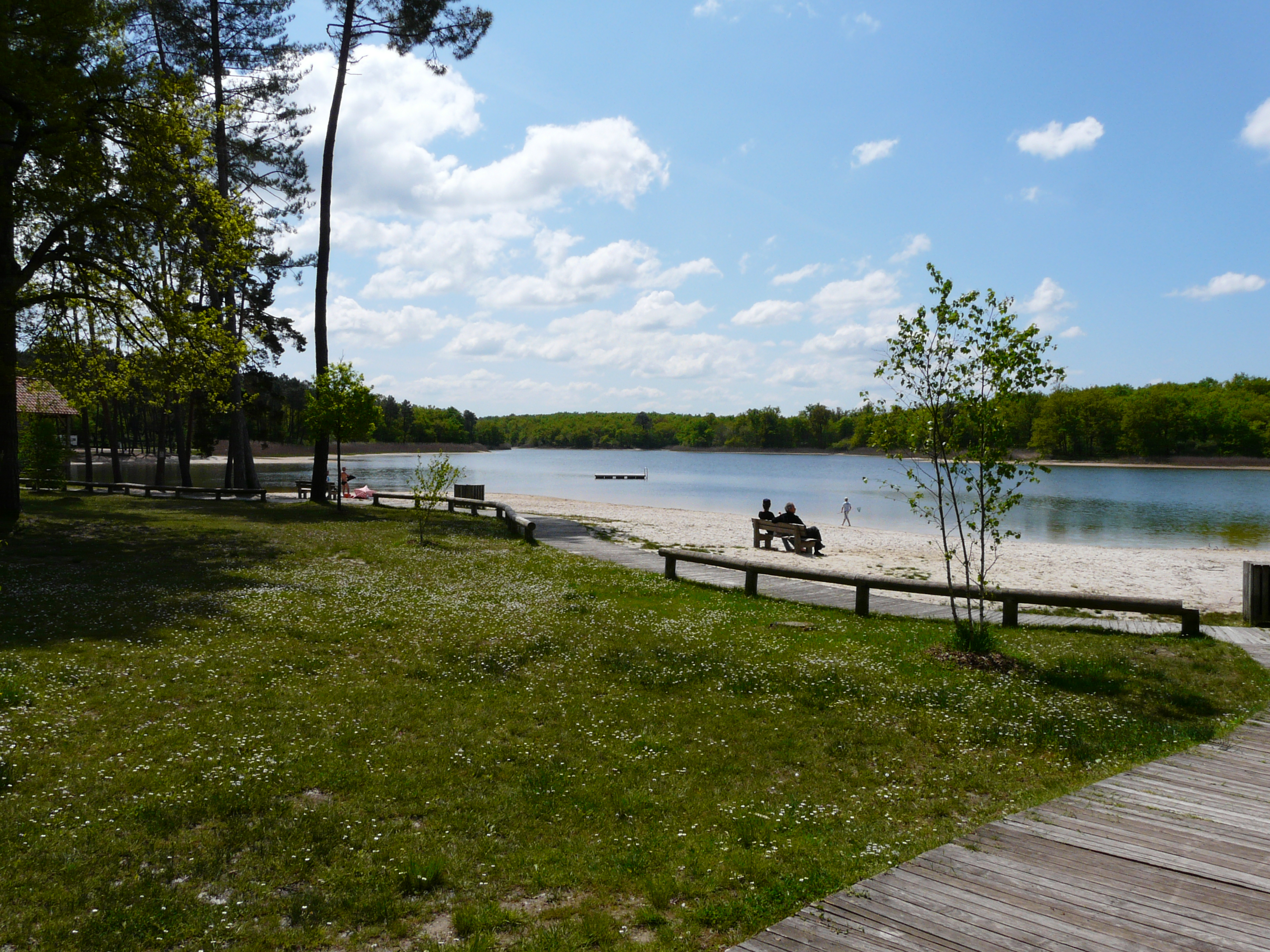
- Grand Etang
- Location of La Jemaye
- Location within France Location within Nouvelle-Aquitaine
- Coordinates: 45°10′15″N 0°15′31″E
- Country: France
- Region: Nouvelle-Aquitaine
- Department: Dordogne
- Arrondissement: Périgueux
- Canton: Ribérac
- Commune: La Jemaye-Ponteyraud
- Area^{1}: 29.12 km^{2} (11.24 sq mi)
- Elevation: 100 m (330 ft)
- Highest elevation: 131 m (430 ft)
- Lowest elevation: 52 m (171 ft)
- Population (2022): 107
  - Density: 3.67/km^{2} (9.52/sq mi)
- Time zone: UTC+01:00 (CET)
  - Summer (DST): UTC+02:00 (CEST)
- Postal code: 24410
- ^{1} French Land Register data, which excludes lakes, ponds, glaciers > 1 km^{2} (0.386 sq mi or 247 acres) and river estuaries.

La Jemaye (French pronunciation: [la ʒəmaj]; Occitan: La Jamaia) is a former commune in the Dordogne department in Nouvelle-Aquitaine in southwestern France. On 1 January 2017, it was merged into the new commune La Jemaye-Ponteyraud.

== See also ==
- Communes of the Dordogne department
