= Château de Saint-Geniès (Dordogne) =

Château in Nouvelle-Aquitaine, France

Coordinates: 44°59′39″N 1°15′02″E

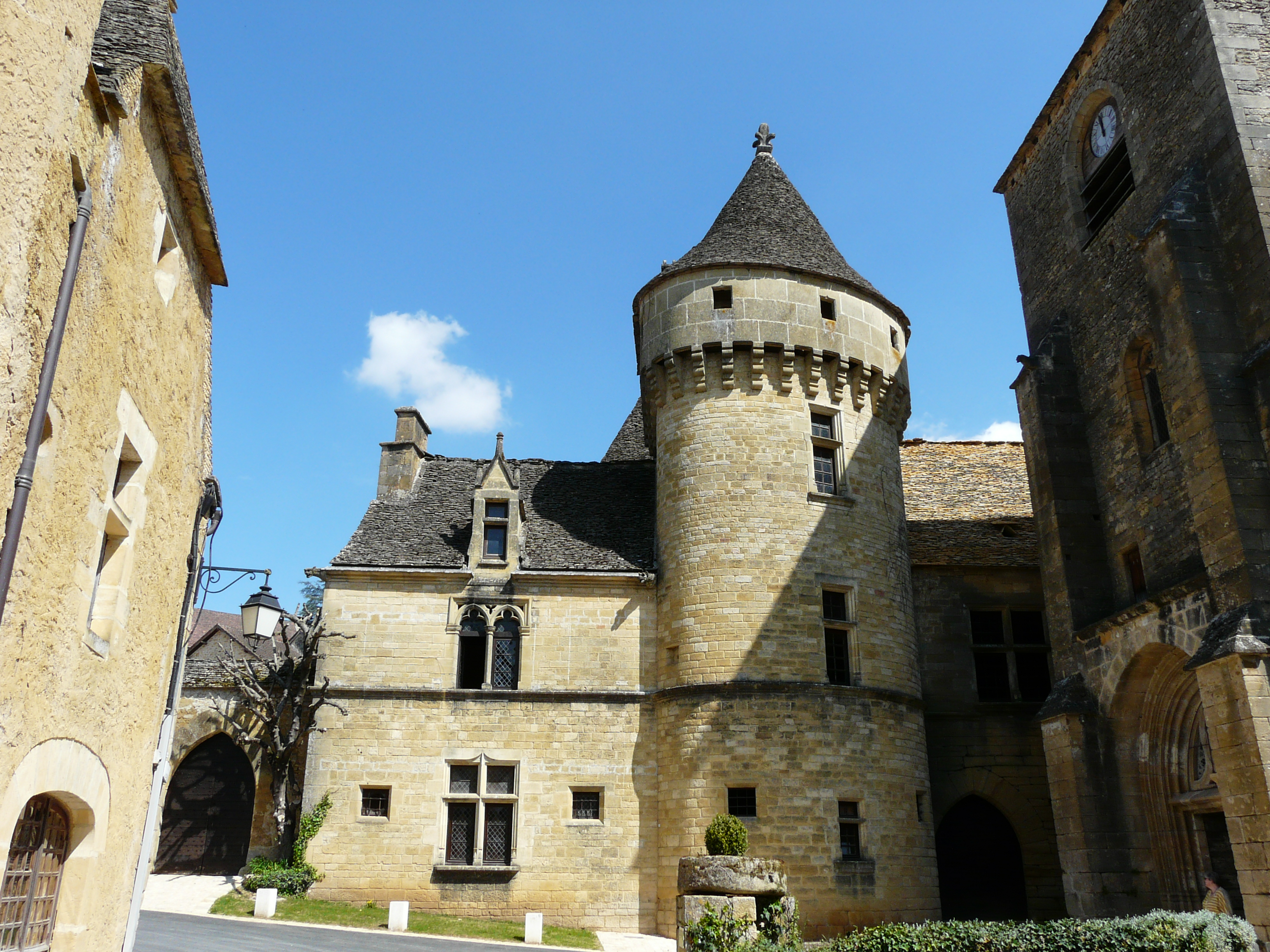
Château de Saint-Geniès

The Château de Saint-Geniès is a château in Saint-Geniès, Dordogne, Nouvelle-Aquitaine, France.

Principally constructed in the 13th and 16th centuries, parts of it have been classified as a monument historique since 1976.
