= Saint Wulfric =

Saint Wulfric may refer to:

- Wulfric of Holme, 10th-century saint
- Wulfric of Haselbury, 12th-century saint
