= Grèzes =

Grèzes is the name of several communes in France:

- Grèzes, Dordogne
- Grèzes, Haute-Loire
- Grèzes, Lot
- Grèzes, Lozère
