= December 9 (Eastern Orthodox liturgics) =

Day in the Eastern Orthodox liturgical calendar

Eastern Orthodox liturgical calendar
December 8	December 9	December 10
December 9 O.S. ≍ December 22 N.S. December 9 N.S ≍ November 26 O.S.

An Eastern Orthodox cross

December 9 in Eastern Orthodox liturgical calendars is a feast day and a day of commemoration of saints and martyrs. Although some Orthodox churches use the Revised Julian Calendar and others use the traditional Julian calendar, the fixed commemorations for their respective December 9 are broadly the same, no matter which calendar is used. (Note: Despite the dates being the same, the days to which they refer typically differ by 13 days. The notation Old Style or O.S. is sometimes used to indicate a date in the traditional Julian Calendar (the "Old Calendar"). The notation New Style or N.S. indicates a date in the Revised Julian calendar (the "New Calendar").)

== Feasts ==
- The Conception by St. Anna of the Most Holy Theotokos.

== Saints ==
- Prophetess Anna (Hannah), mother of the Prophet Samuel (1100 BC)
- Martyr Easios, tortured and beheaded (c. 284-305) (Note: He is unknown in the Synaxarion of St. Nicodemus and absent in the Menaia. However his memory is preserved in Parisian Codex 1621. The biography of this martyr is similar to that of the martyr Euplos (Efplus) (August 11), and it is not impossible that due to a scribal error that Euplos became Easios.)
- Saint Bassa (Vassa), Patrician and Igumenia of a female monastery in Jerusalem, where she also founded the Monastery of Saint Menas, whose Abbot was the Bishop of Jamnia, Stephanos (5th century) (Note: Her memory is preserved in the Jerusalemitic Canonarion, pg.120.) (see also December 7 - Russian)
- Martyr Sositheus of Persia, by the sword (553)
- Saint Sophronius the Archbishop of Cyprus (6th century) (see also: December 8)
- Martyr Narses (Nerses) of Persia, by the sword
- Martyr Isaac
- Saint Stephen "the New Light" of Constantinople (912) (Note: The Monk Stephen the New-Radiant was born at Constantinople and received a fine education. Under Patriarch Methodios (82-846) Stephen accepted monastic tonsure and entered amongst the clergy at one of the Constantinople churches. Later he went into seclusion and over a span of 50 years he constantly increased his ascetic efforts. Towards the end of his life the monk acquired from the Lord a great grace, shining in the constellation of the Saints like to the ancient ascetics of the Orthodox Church of old, so that he came to be called the "New-Radiant". According to the prologue-accounts of the Saints, he died in the year 912.)

== Pre-Schism Western saints ==
- Saint Syrus, first Bishop and main patron-saint of Pavia in Italy (c. 1st century)
- Virgin-Martyr Valeria (Valerie) of Limoges or Aquitaine, by tradition she was converted by Saint Martial of Limoges in France and beheaded (1st-3rd century)
- Saint Nectarius of Auvergne (c. 300)
- Virgin Martyr Leocadia (Locaie) of Toledo, Spain (c. 303)
- Saint Proculus of Verona, Bishop of Verona in Italy, a confessor during the persecution of Diocletian, reposed in peace (c. 320)
- Martyrs Peter, Successus, Bassian, Primitivus and 20 other Companions, in North Africa
- Saint Cyprian, a monk at Périgueux in France, who ended his life as a hermit on the banks of the Dordogne (586)
- Saint Augard, hermit at Saint-Augard-en-Paule in Brittany (6th century)
- Saint Restitutus, Bishop of Carthage in North Africa and Martyr
- Saint Balda, third Abbess of Jouarre in France (7th century)
- Saint Budoc (Budeaux), born in Brittany, became Abbot of Youghal in Ireland, then Bishop of Dol in Brittany (7th century?)
- Saint Ethelgiva (Æthelgifu), the daughter of King Alfred the Great, became first Abbess of Shaftesbury (896) (Note: "ST. ETHELGIVA, or ÆTHELGIFU, was the daughter of the great King Alfred and his saintly wife Ethelwida. Recognising her vocation to the religious state, the King built and endowed the monastery at Shaftesbury for her reception. She was appointed Abbess, and after a life of eminent holiness, there ended her days about the year 896.")
- Saint Egbert, Bishop of Trier in Germany (993)
- Saint Wulfric (also known as Wolfeius), a hermit at St Benet Hulme in Norfolk in England (c. 1000)
- Saint Enguerrammus (Angilram) 'the Wise', monk and Abbot of Saint Riquier in France (1045)

== Post-Schism Orthodox saints ==
- Saint Anthimus of Sofia, Hieromonk and Elder of Mount Athos, Fool for Christ (1867)

=== New martyrs and confessors ===
- New Hieromartyr Vladimir Vinogradov, Priest (1919)
- New Hieromartyr Vladimir Dzhurinsky, Priest, and Virgin Martyr Ephrosia Dzhurinsky (1920)
- New Hieromartyrs Basil Yagodin, Protopresbyter, and Alexander Buravtsev, Priest (1937)
- New Hieromartyr Paul Levashov, Archpriest of Gomel (disappeared 1937)
- New Hieromartyr Sergius Mechev, Priest of Moscow (1941)

== Other commemorations ==
- Commemoration of the Founding of the Church of the Resurrection at Jerusalem (335)
- Unexpected Joy Icon of the Mother of God
- Repose of Archimandrite Theodosius of Tismana and Sophroniev Monasteries, fellow-struggler of Saint Paisius Velichkovsky (1802)

== Icon gallery ==
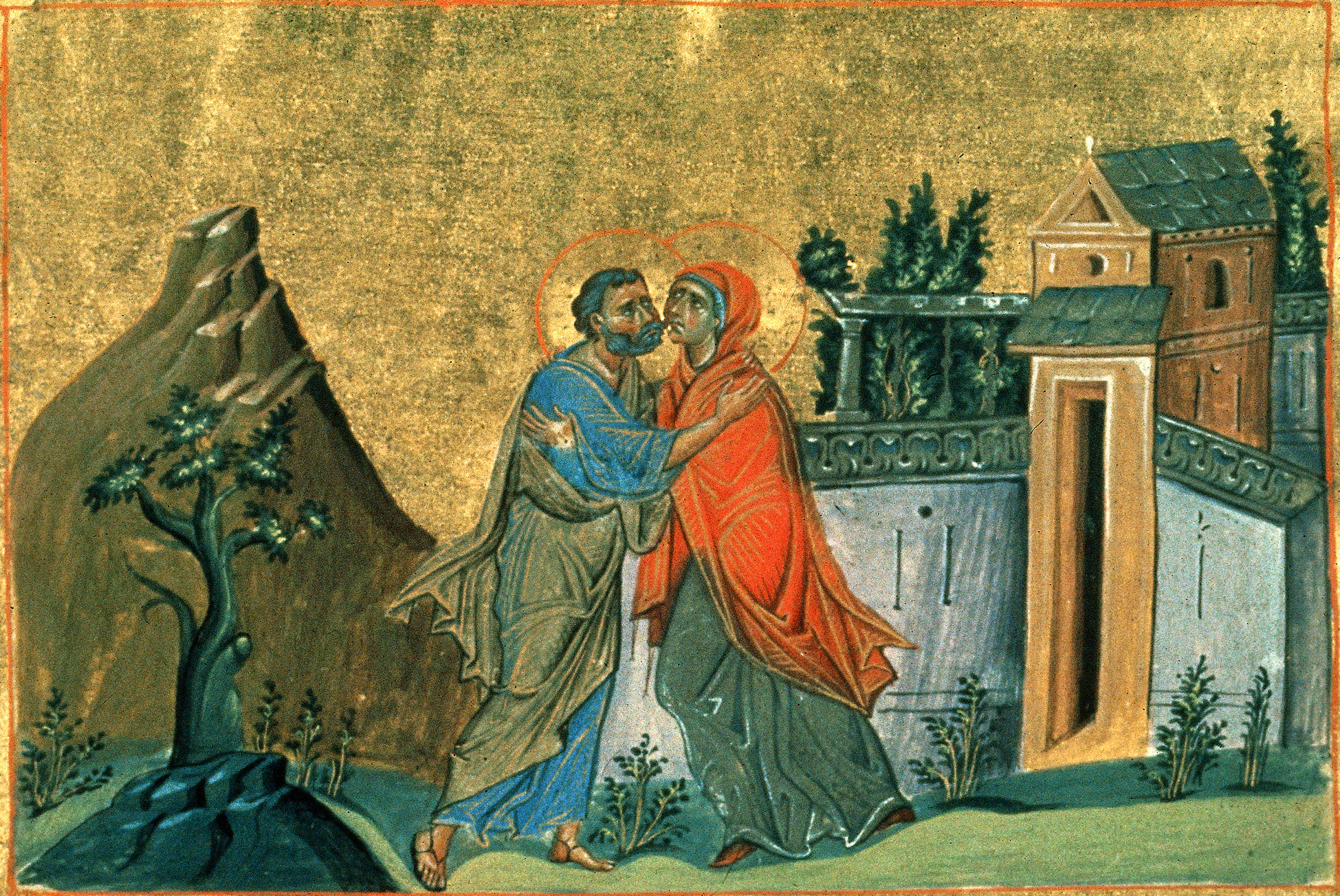
Holy and Righteous Ancestors of God Joachim and Anna (Meeting at the Golden gate).
(Menologion of Basil II, 10th century).

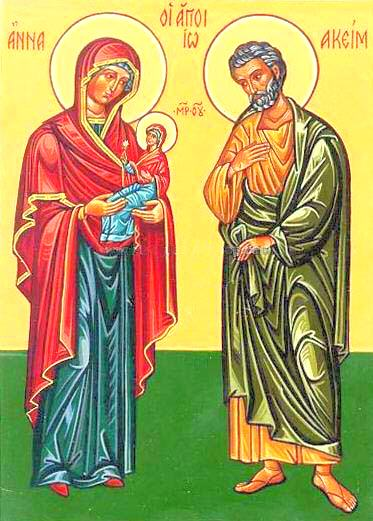
The Holy and Righteous Ancestors of God Joachim and Anna.

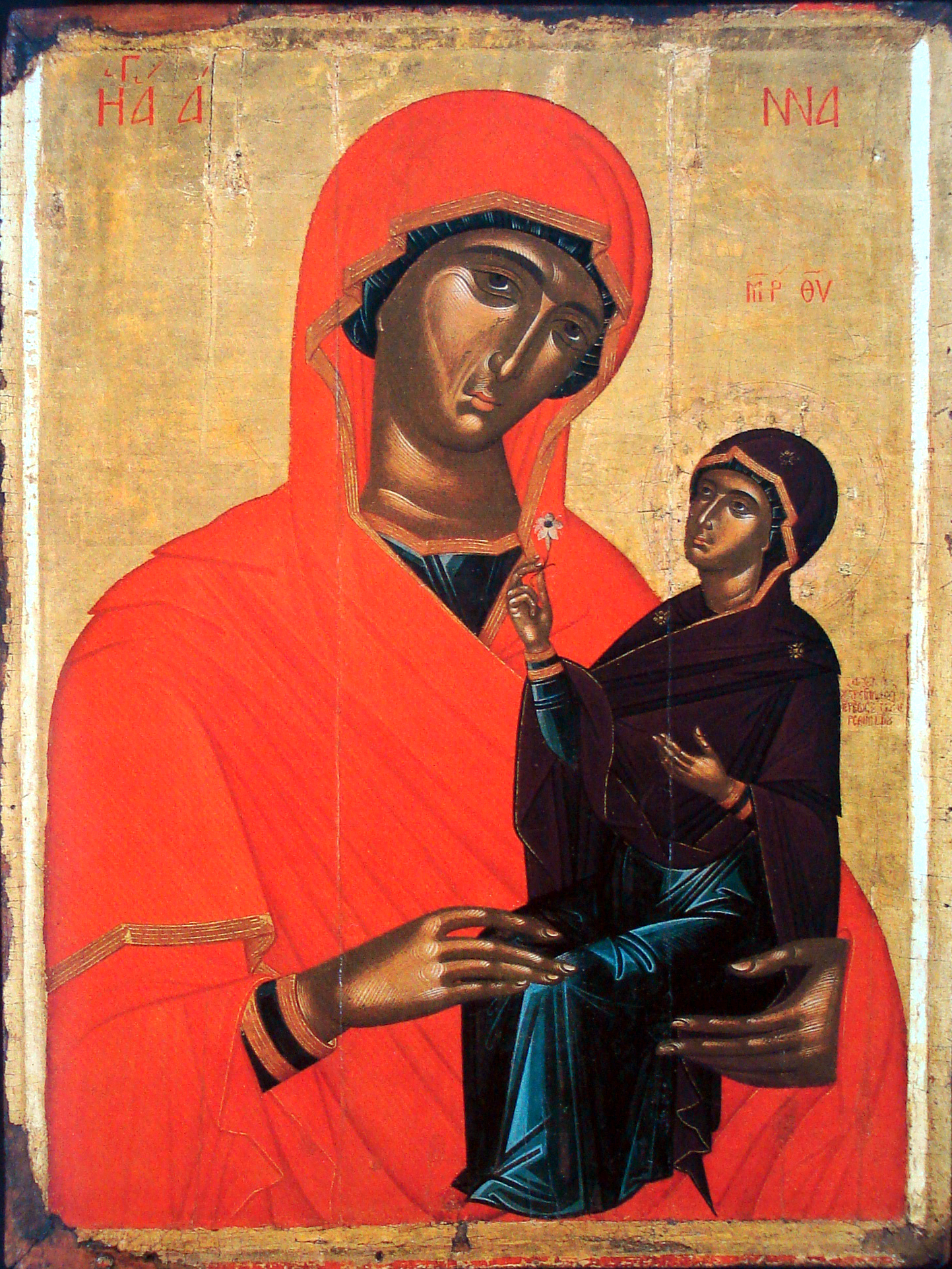
Saint Anne with the Virgin Mary.
(Angelos Akotanos, 15th century).

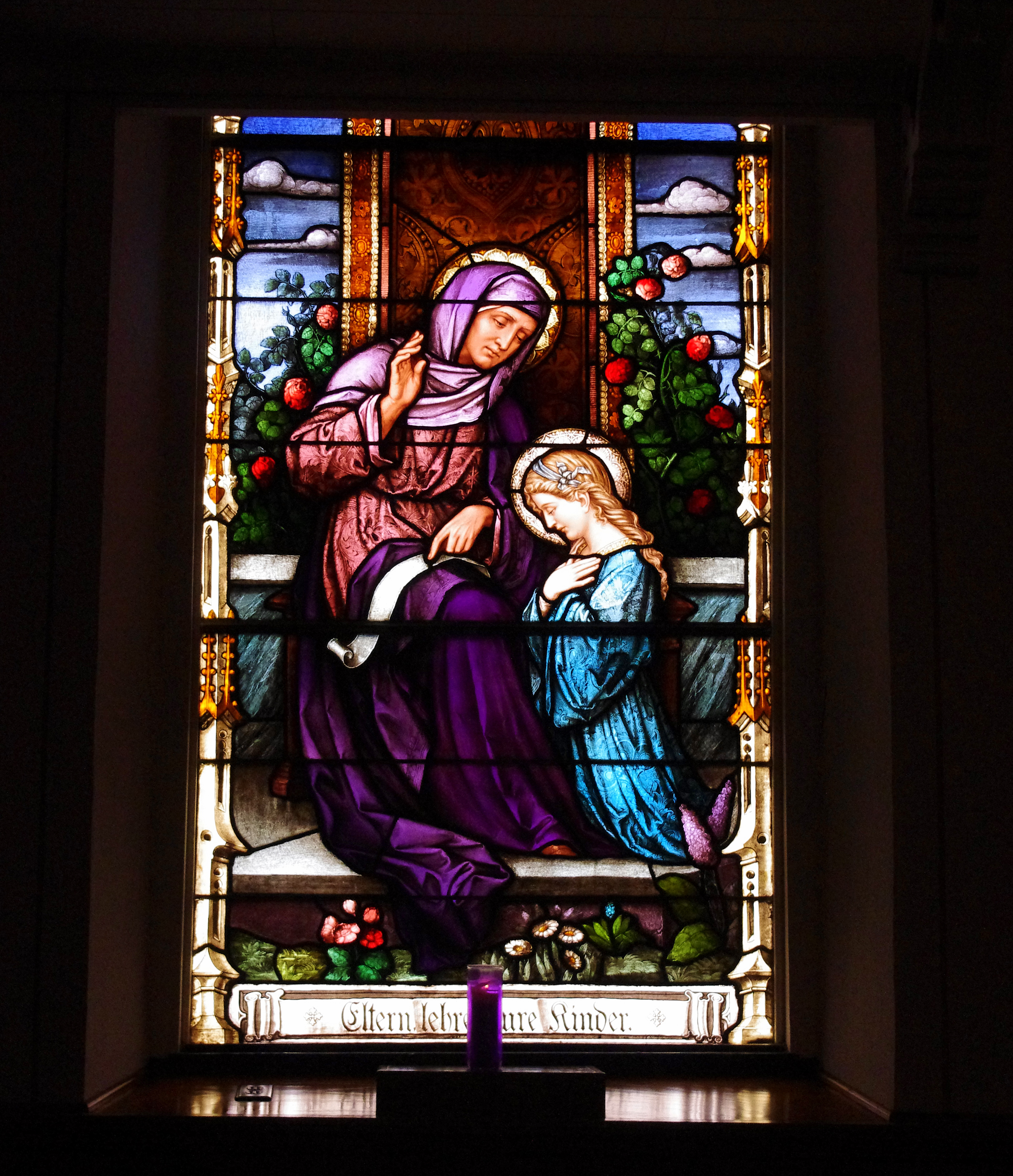
Stained glass of St. Anne and the child St. Mary.
(St. John the Baptist, Vincennes, Indiana).

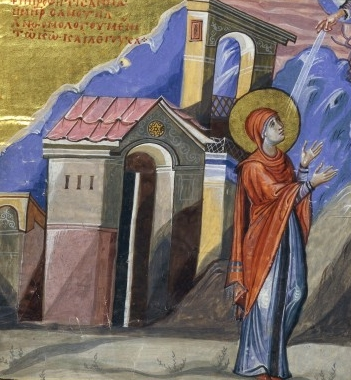
Prophetess Anna (Hannah), mother of Prophet Samuel. (Paris Psalter, 10th century).

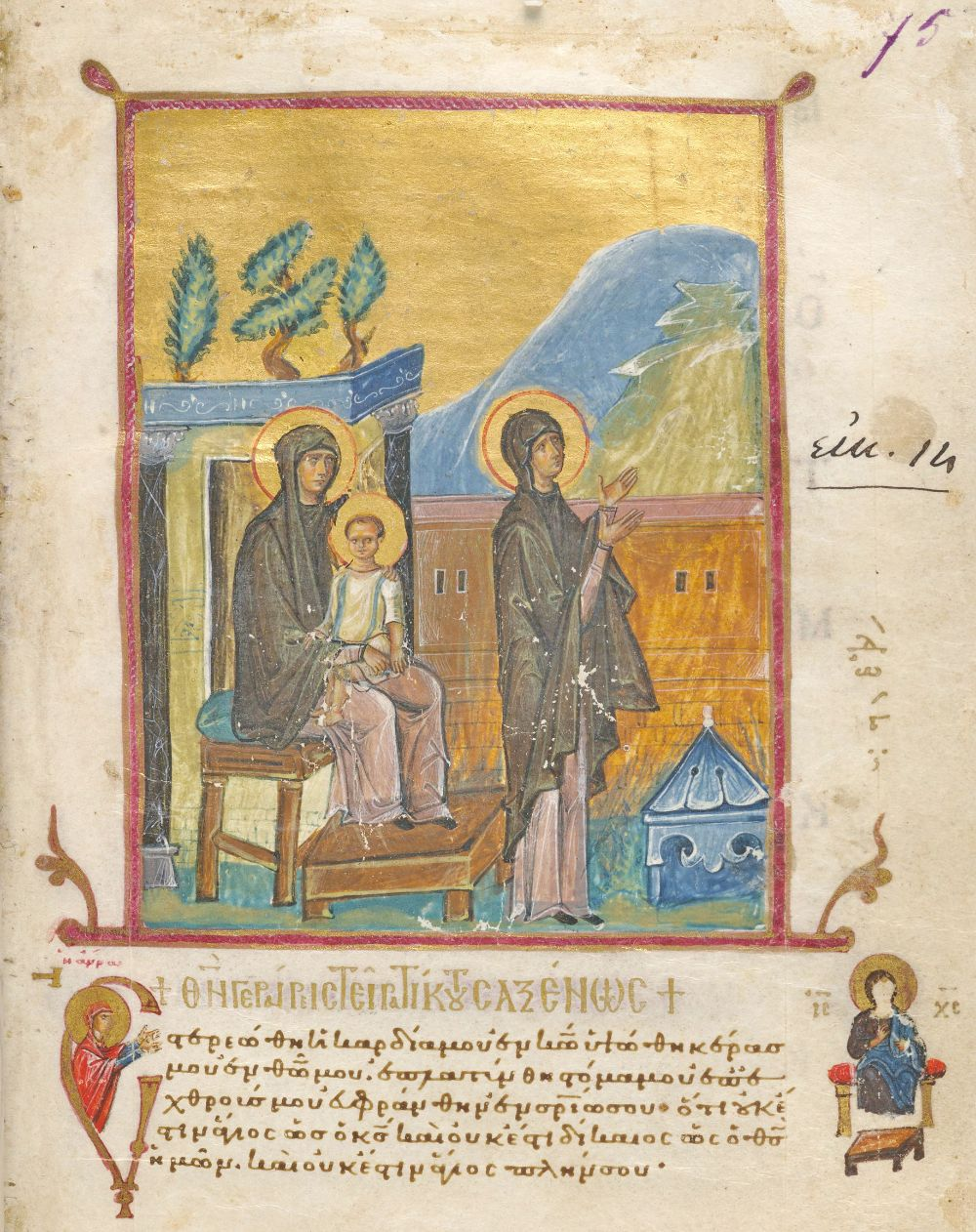
Prophetess Anna (Hannah) and Samuel.

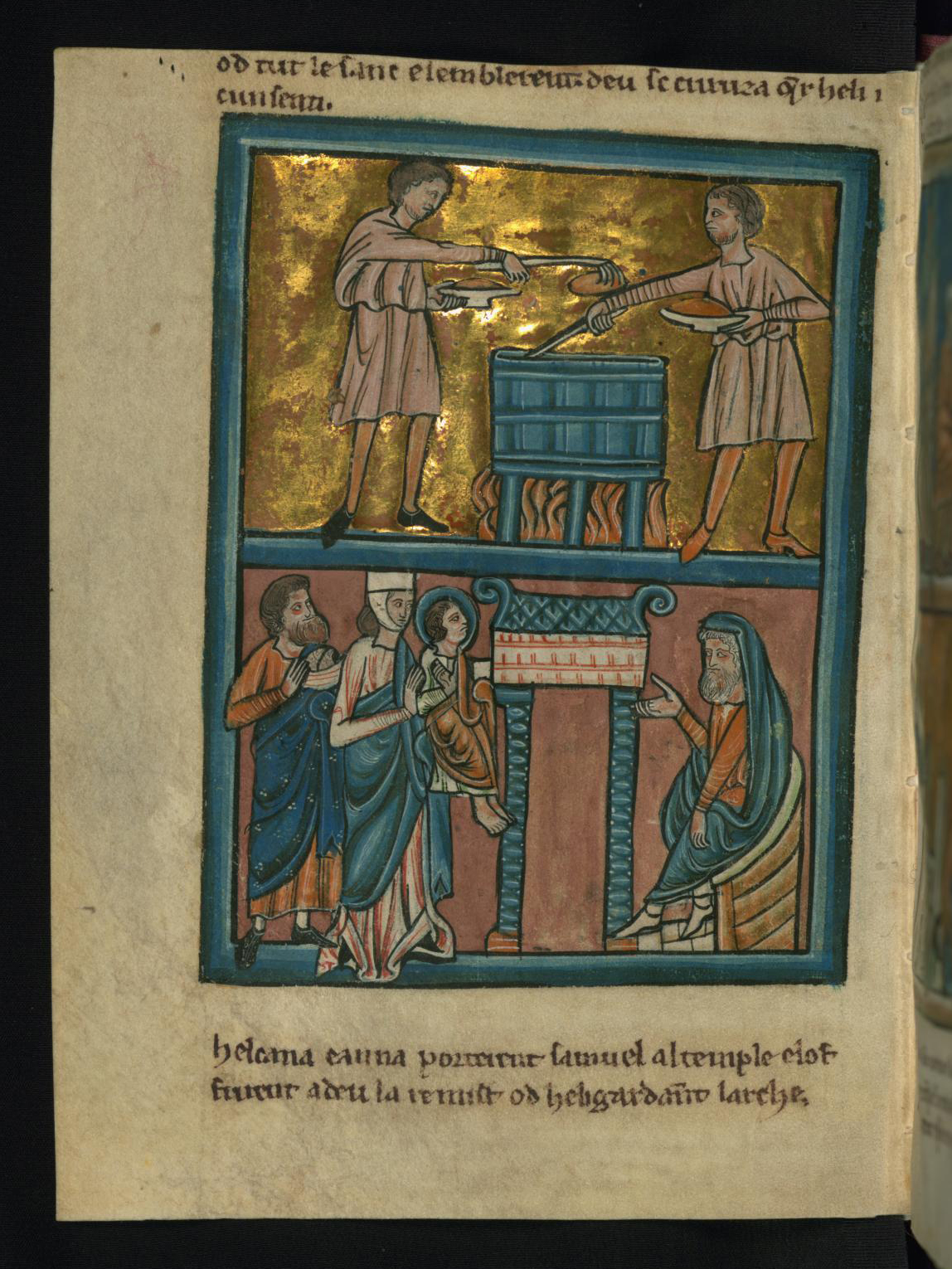
Bottom: When Samuel was weaned, Hannah and Elkanah brought him to the temple. (William de Brailes, c. 1250).

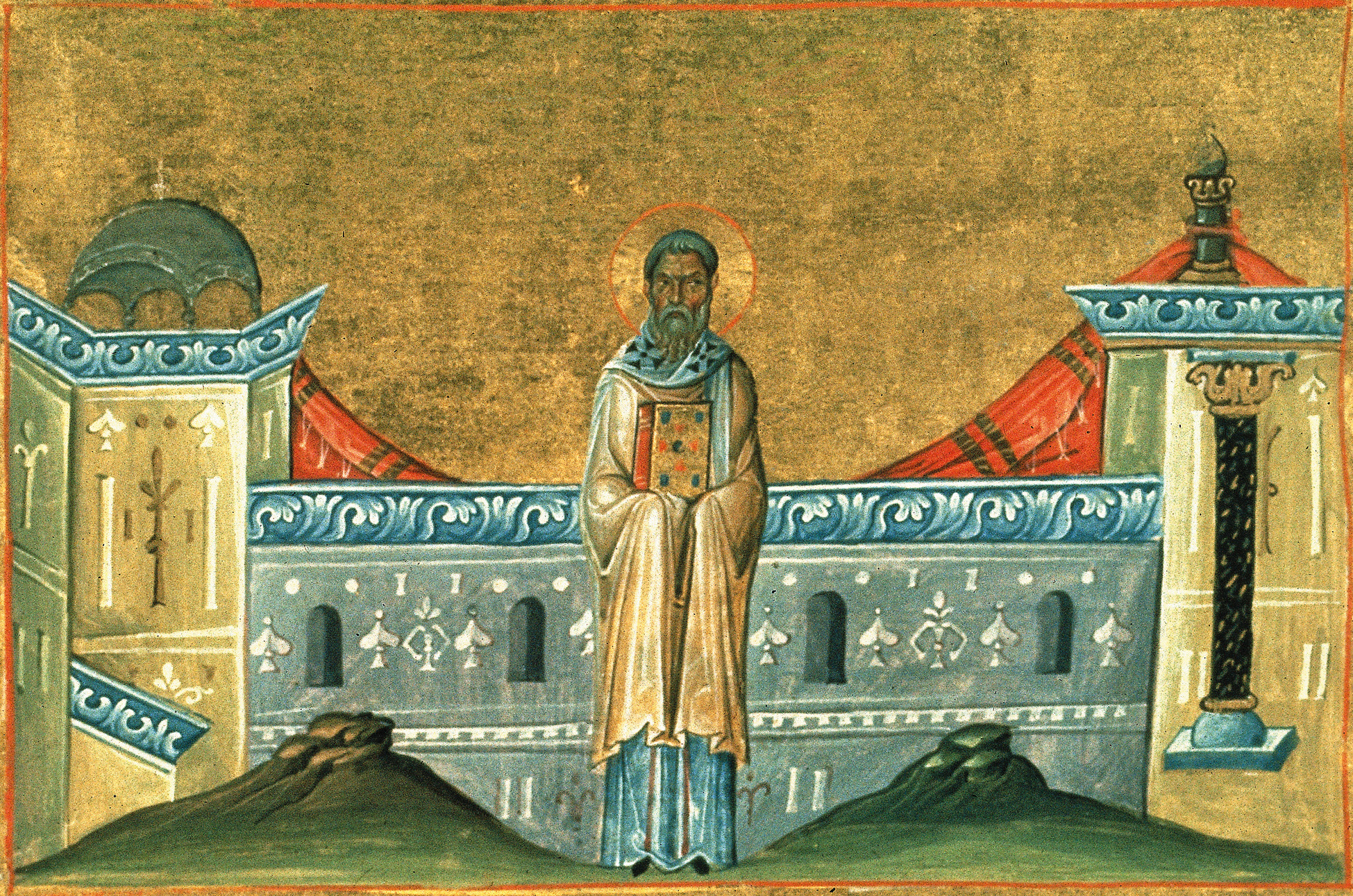
St. Sophronius, Archbishop of Cyprus.
(Menologion of Basil II, 10th century).

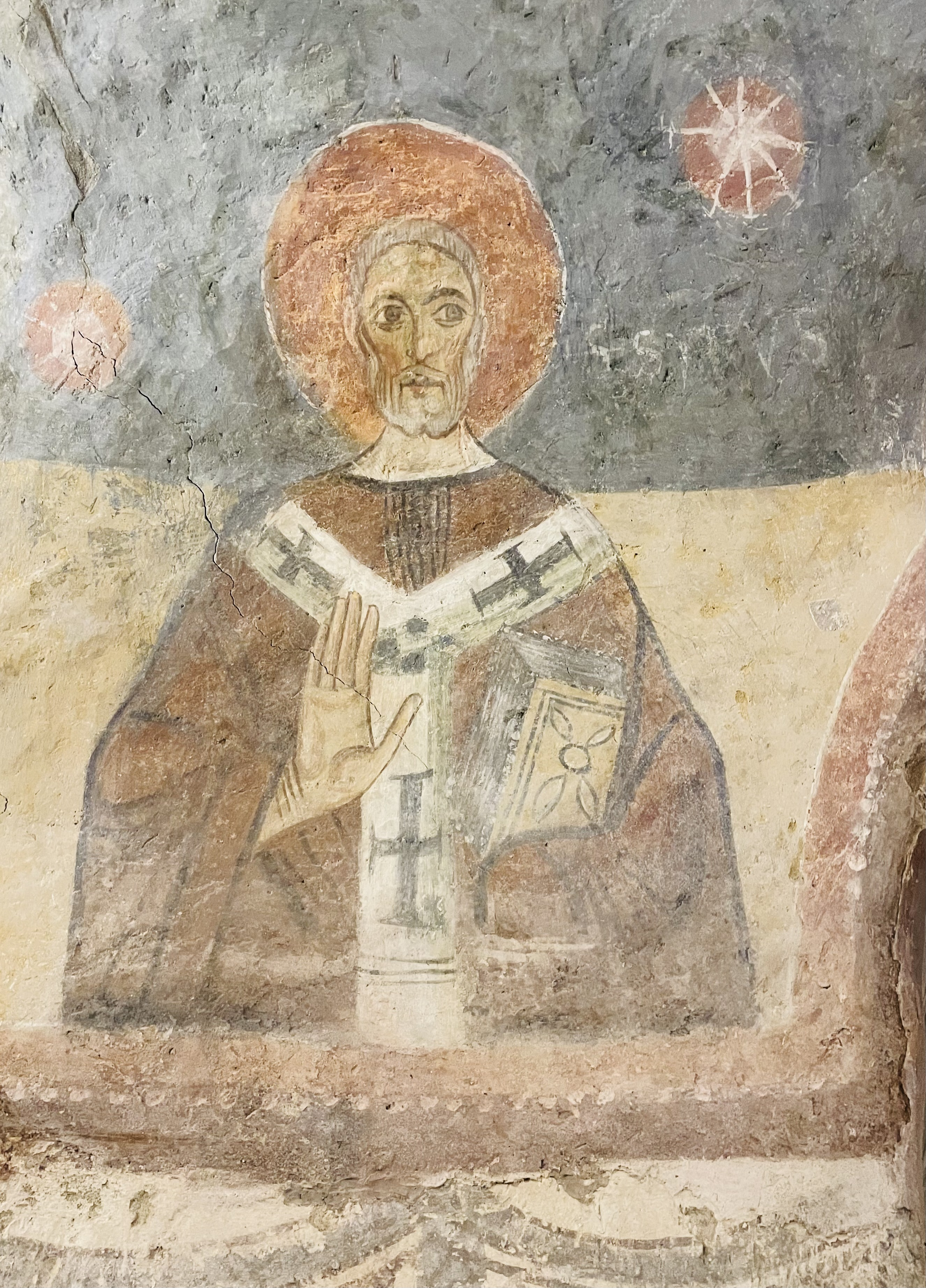
St. Syrus of Pavia, first Bishop and patron-saint of Pavia, Italy.

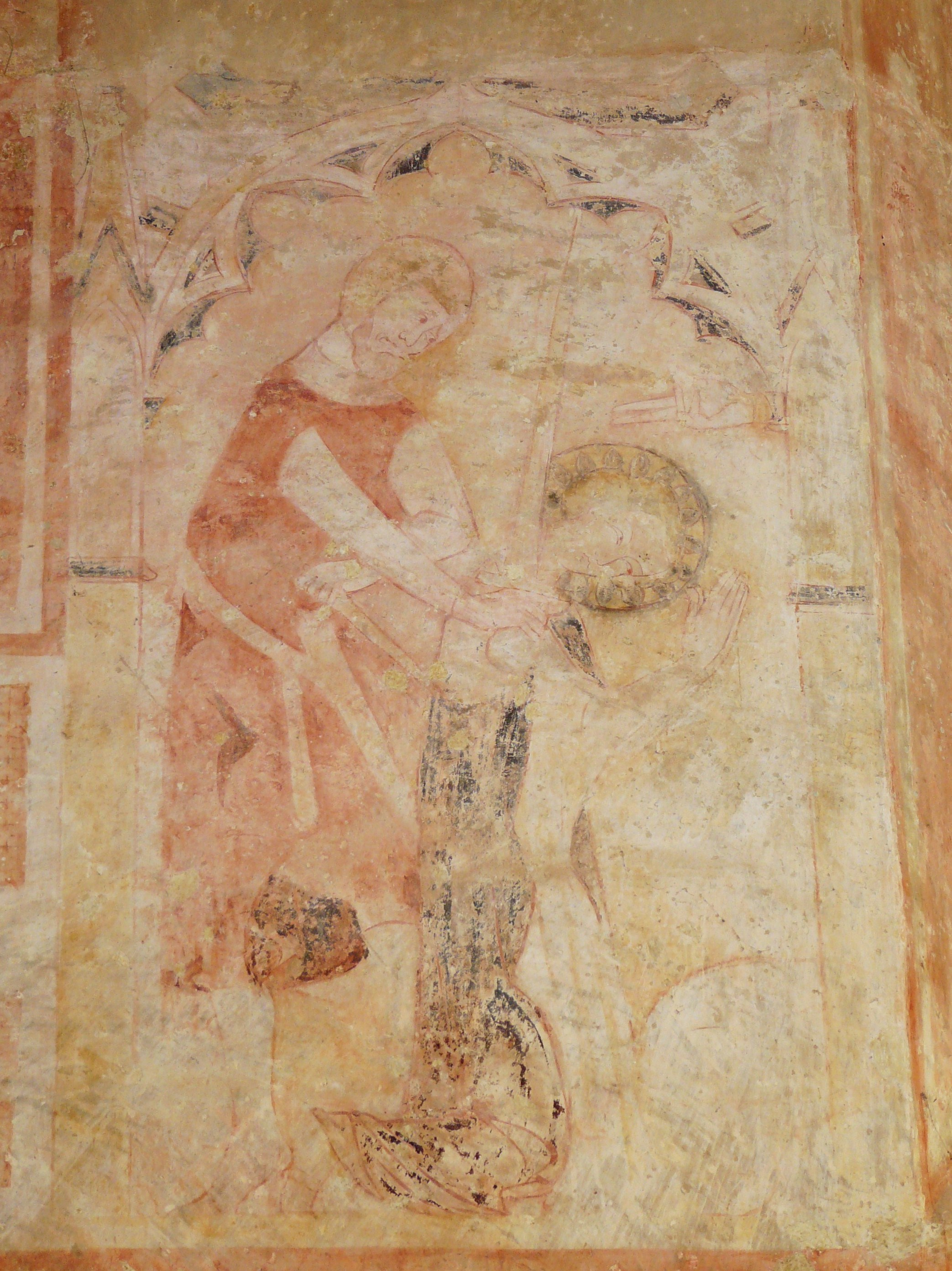
The Beheading of St. Valerie of Limoges. (Fresco of the first bay north, Cheylat chapel, Saint-Geniès, Dordogne, France).

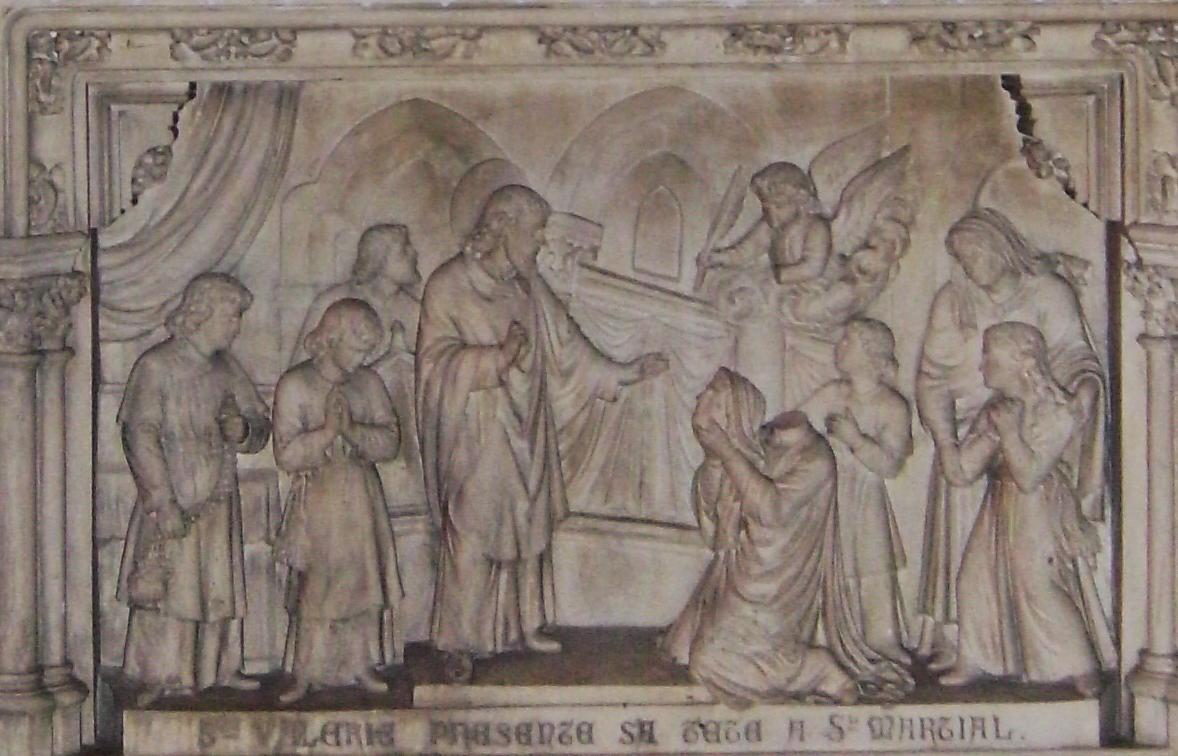
Close-up of altar relief: St. Valerie of Limoges presents her own head to her confessor, St. Martial. (Altar in St. Michel des Lions, Limoges).

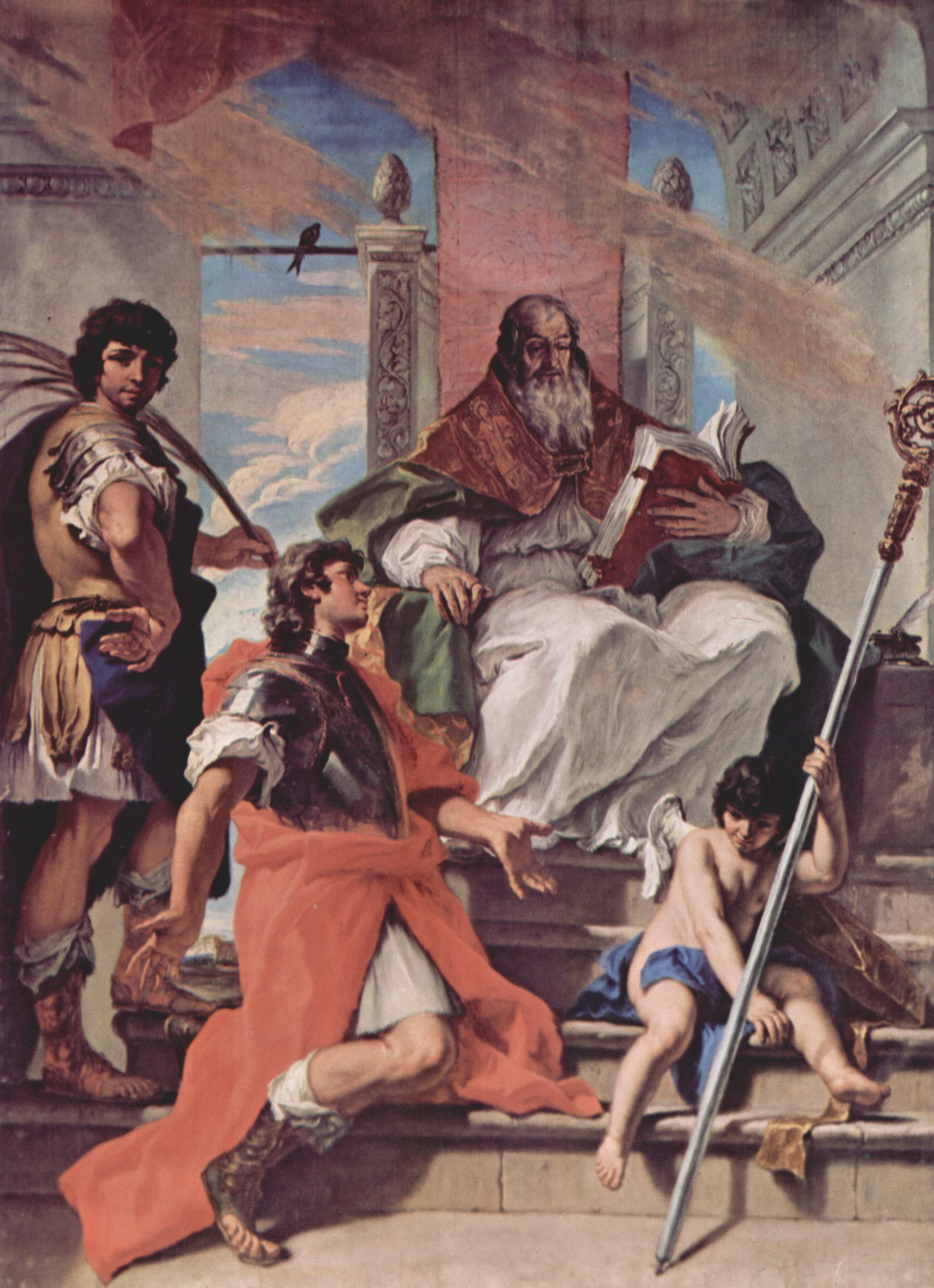
Saints Firmus and Rusticus of Verona with an angel. Saint Proculus of Verona is seated. (Sebastiano Ricci, 1704).

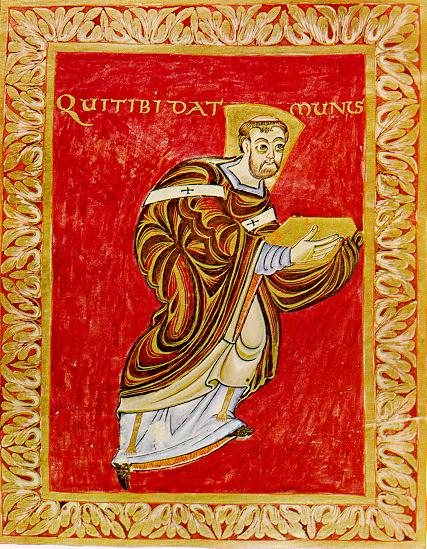
St. Egbert, Bishop of Trier in Germany.
(Egbert Psalter).

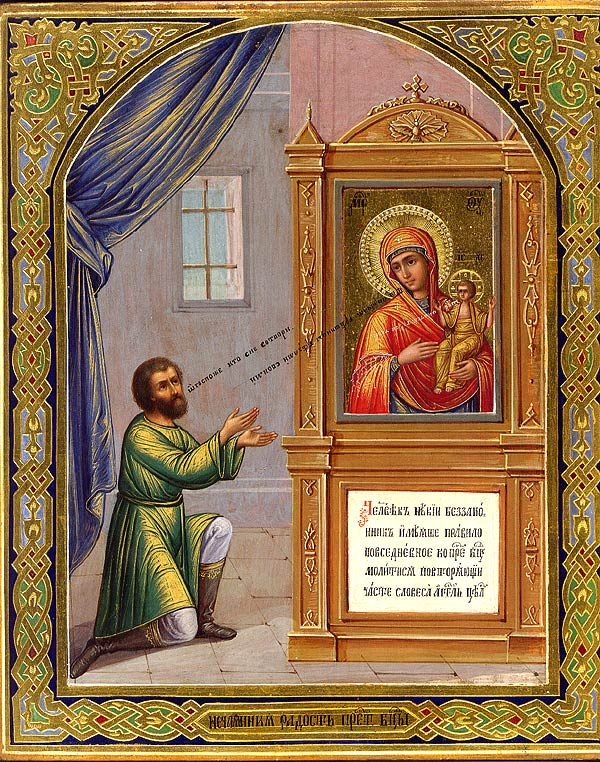
Icon of the Most Holy Theotokos "Unexpected Joy" (19th century).

== Sources ==
- December 9/22. Orthodox Calendar (PRAVOSLAVIE.RU).
- December 22 / December 9. HOLY TRINITY RUSSIAN ORTHODOX CHURCH (A parish of the Patriarchate of Moscow).
- December 9. OCA - The Lives of the Saints.
- The Autonomous Orthodox Metropolia of Western Europe and the Americas (ROCOR). St. Hilarion Calendar of Saints for the year of our Lord 2004. St. Hilarion Press (Austin, TX). p. 92.
- December 9. Latin Saints of the Orthodox Patriarchate of Rome.
- The Roman Martyrology. Transl. by the Archbishop of Baltimore. Last Edition, According to the Copy Printed at Rome in 1914. Revised Edition, with the Imprimatur of His Eminence Cardinal Gibbons. Baltimore: John Murphy Company, 1916. pp. 378–379.

Greek Sources

- Great Synaxaristes: (in Greek) 9 ΔΕΚΕΜΒΡΙΟΥ. ΜΕΓΑΣ ΣΥΝΑΞΑΡΙΣΤΗΣ.
- (in Greek) Συναξαριστής. 9 Δεκεμβρίου. ECCLESIA.GR. (H ΕΚΚΛΗΣΙΑ ΤΗΣ ΕΛΛΑΔΟΣ).

Russian Sources

- (in Russian) 22 декабря (9 декабря). Православная Энциклопедия под редакцией Патриарха Московского и всея Руси Кирилла (электронная версия). (Orthodox Encyclopedia - Pravenc.ru).
- (in Russian) 9 декабря (ст.ст.) 22 декабря 2014 (нов. ст.). Русская Православная Церковь Отдел внешних церковных связей. (DECR).
