= Chavagnac, Dordogne =

Chavagnac
- Part of Les Coteaux Périgourdins
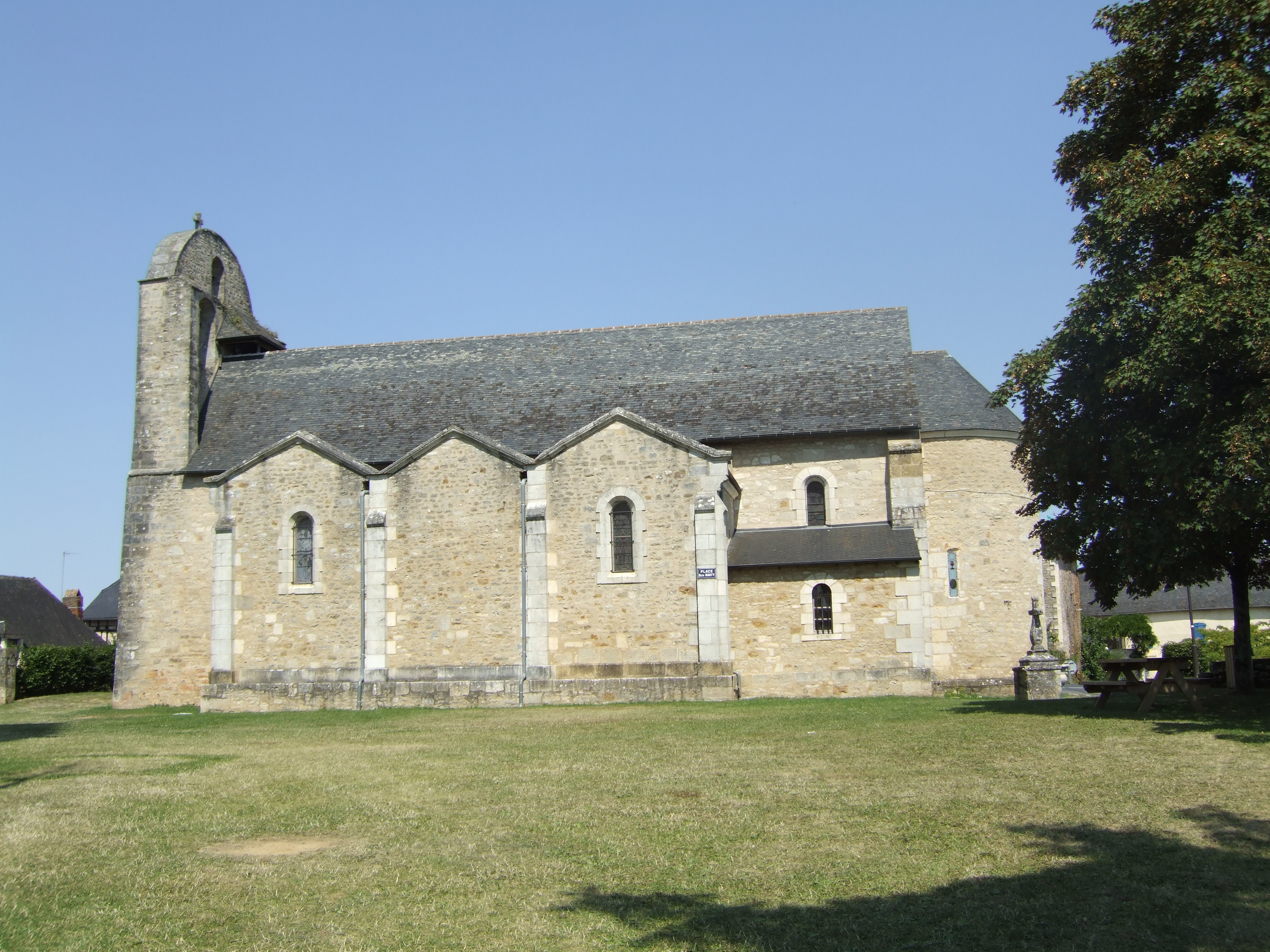
- Location of Chavagnac
- Location within France Location within Nouvelle-Aquitaine
- Coordinates: 45°05′24″N 1°22′22″E
- Country: France
- Region: Nouvelle-Aquitaine
- Department: Dordogne
- Arrondissement: Sarlat-la-Canéda
- Canton: Terrasson-Lavilledieu
- Commune: Les Coteaux Périgourdins
- Area^{1}: 13.59 km^{2} (5.25 sq mi)
- Elevation: 318 m (1,043 ft)
- Highest elevation: 354 m (1,161 ft)
- Lowest elevation: 136 m (446 ft)
- Population (2023): 363
  - Density: 26.7/km^{2} (69.2/sq mi)
- Time zone: UTC+01:00 (CET)
  - Summer (DST): UTC+02:00 (CEST)
- Postal code: 24120
- ^{1} French Land Register data, which excludes lakes, ponds, glaciers > 1 km^{2} (0.386 sq mi or 247 acres) and river estuaries.

Chavagnac (French pronunciation: [ʃavaɲak]; Occitan: Chavanhac) is a former commune in the Dordogne department in Nouvelle-Aquitaine in southwestern France. On 1 January 2017, it was merged into the new commune Les Coteaux Périgourdins.

== See also ==
- Communes of the Dordogne department
