= Daniel L'Homond =

French storyteller and author (1954–2026)

- Born: 13 June 1954; Pau, France
- Died: 22 April 2026 (aged 71); Saint-Julien-de-Lampon, France
- Education: Bordeaux Montaigne University
- Occupations: Storyteller; Author

Daniel L'Homond (French: [danjˈɛl ˈɛl'omˈɔ̃]; 13 June 1954 – 22 April 2026) was a French storyteller and author.

A graduate of Bordeaux Montaigne University, he was best known for his Périgord accent in his stories, as well as his Occitan influences in his speaking.

L'Homond died in Saint-Julien-de-Lampon on 22 April 2026, at the age of 71.

== Publications ==
- Encore en guerre (1982)
- Périgord Noir, Pyrénées (1992)
- Lo Renat e la loba (1993)
- Sacré Quotidien (1994)
- Le Bestiaire (1996)
- Les lieux disent (1997)
- Dernières nouvelles (2000)
- Anthologie du haïku en France (2001)
- Contes de la Préhistoire (2004)
- Légendaire du Périgord (2005)
- Tour de France multicolore des contes (2006)
- Vide-Grenier (2007)
- Petite Mythologie Portative du Périgord (2009)
