= Pazayac =

- Commune
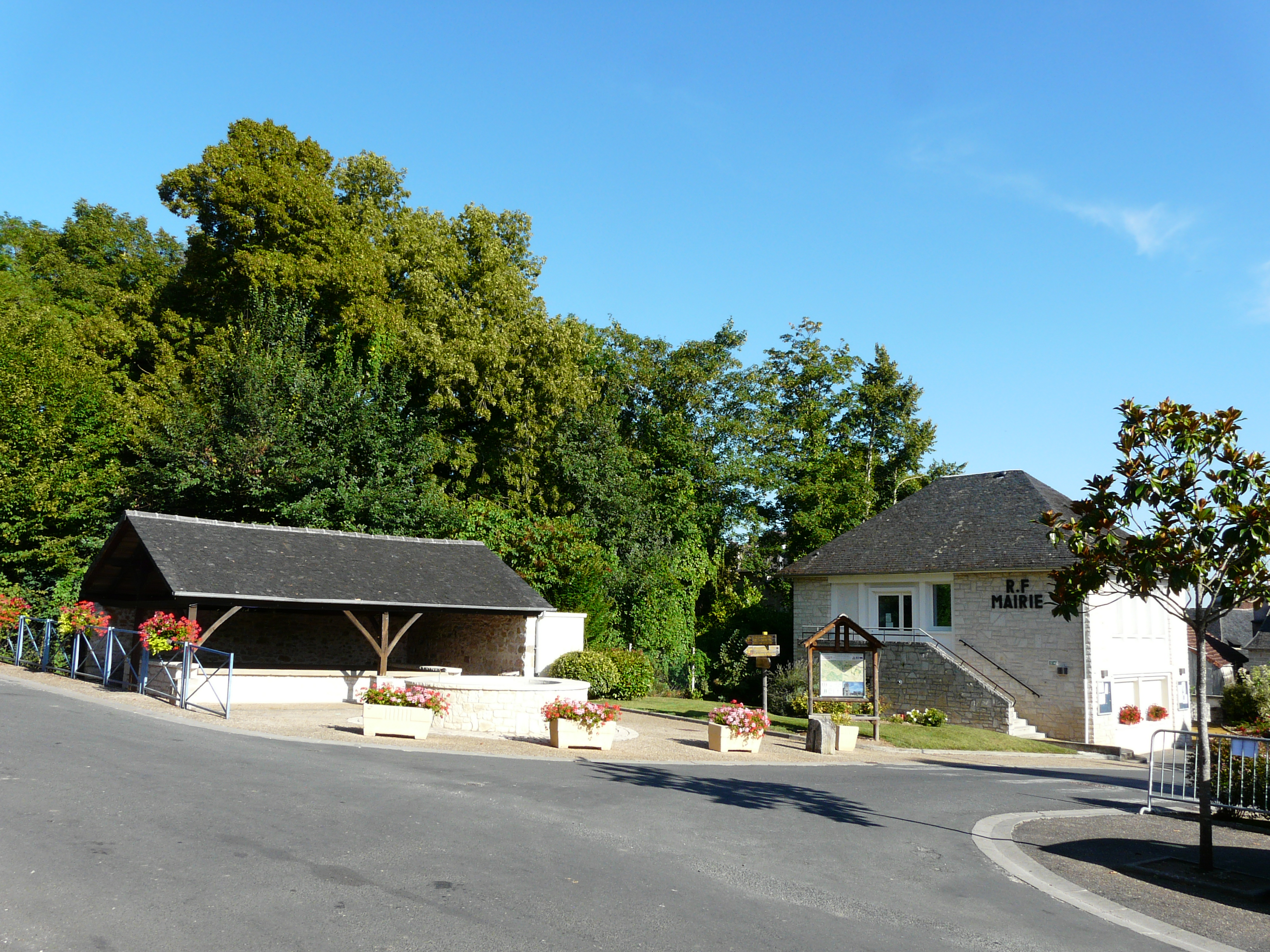
- The wash house and town hall in Pazayac

- Coat of arms
- Location of Pazayac
- Location within France Location within Nouvelle-Aquitaine
- Coordinates: 45°07′19″N 1°22′50″E
- Country: France
- Region: Nouvelle-Aquitaine
- Department: Dordogne
- Arrondissement: Sarlat-la-Canéda
- Canton: Terrasson-Lavilledieu

Government
  - Mayor (2020–2026): Jean Dumontet
- Area^{1}: 6.84 km^{2} (2.64 sq mi)
- Elevation: 119 m (390 ft)
- Highest elevation: 306 m (1,004 ft)
- Lowest elevation: 88 m (289 ft)
- Population (2023): 811
  - Density: 119/km^{2} (307/sq mi)
- Time zone: UTC+01:00 (CET)
  - Summer (DST): UTC+02:00 (CEST)
- INSEE/Postal code: 24321 /24120
- ^{1} French Land Register data, which excludes lakes, ponds, glaciers > 1 km^{2} (0.386 sq mi or 247 acres) and river estuaries.

Pazayac (French pronunciation: [pazajak]; Occitan: Pasaiac) is a commune in the Dordogne department in Nouvelle-Aquitaine in southwestern France.

== Population ==
Historical population
| Year | Pop. | ±% p.a. |
|---|---|---|
| 1968 | 411 | — |
| 1975 | 625 | +6.17% |
| 1982 | 627 | +0.05% |
| 1990 | 640 | +0.26% |
| 1999 | 574 | −1.20% |
| 2007 | 828 | +4.69% |
| 2012 | 847 | +0.45% |
| 2017 | 880 | +0.77% |
| 2023 | 811 | −1.35% |
Source: INSEE

== See also ==
- Communes of the Dordogne department
