= La Cassagne =

- Commune
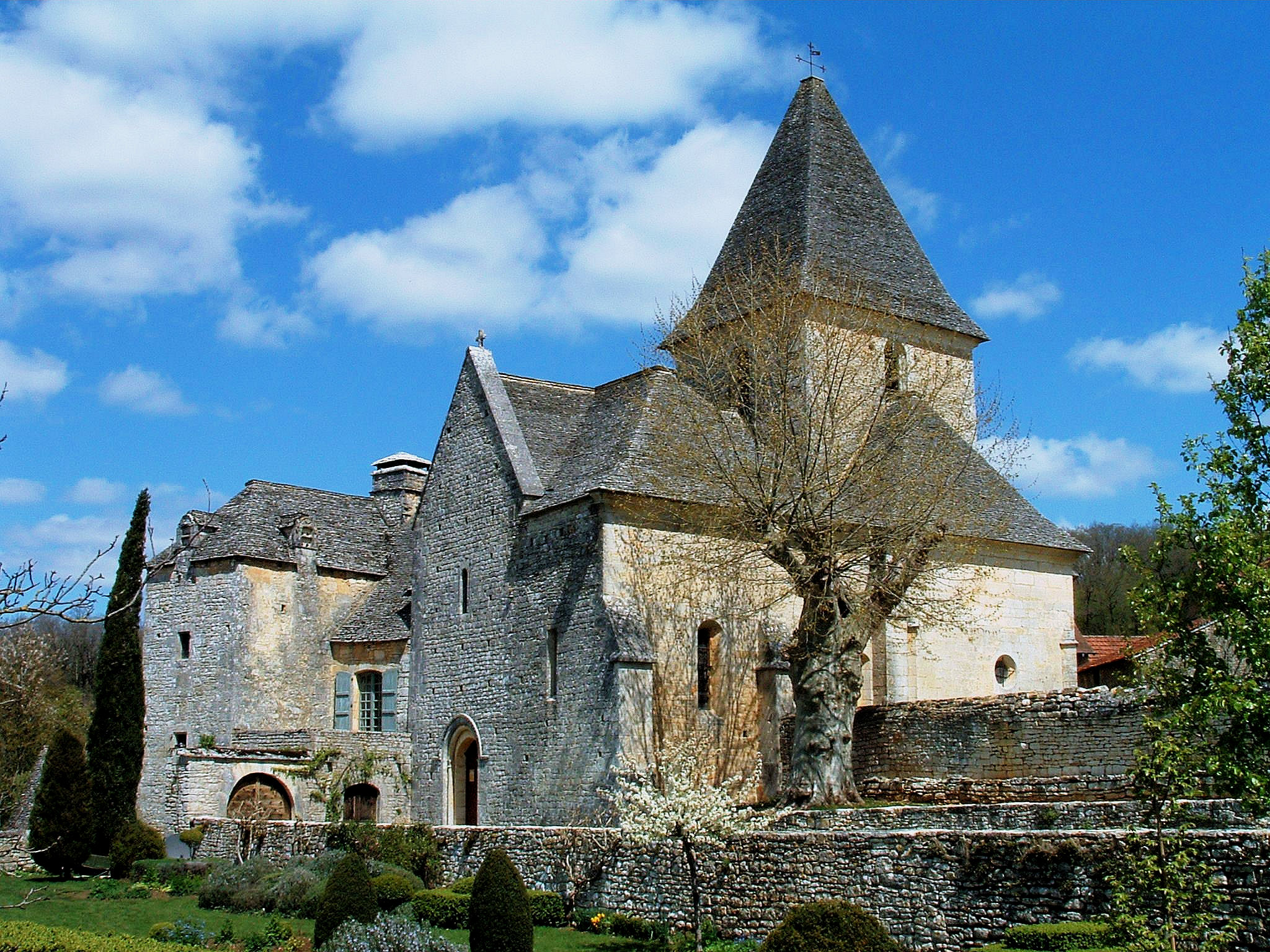
- The priory in La Cassagne
- Location of La Cassagne
- Location within France Location within Nouvelle-Aquitaine
- Coordinates: 45°02′47″N 1°19′08″E
- Country: France
- Region: Nouvelle-Aquitaine
- Department: Dordogne
- Arrondissement: Sarlat-la-Canéda
- Canton: Terrasson-Lavilledieu
- Intercommunality: Terrassonnais en Périgord Noir Thenon Hautefort

Government
  - Mayor (2020–2026): Sébastien Luneau
- Area^{1}: 14.85 km^{2} (5.73 sq mi)
- Elevation: 276 m (906 ft)
- Highest elevation: 303 m (994 ft)
- Lowest elevation: 106 m (348 ft)
- Population (2023): 149
  - Density: 10.0/km^{2} (26.0/sq mi)
- Time zone: UTC+01:00 (CET)
  - Summer (DST): UTC+02:00 (CEST)
- INSEE/Postal code: 24085 /24120
- ^{1} French Land Register data, which excludes lakes, ponds, glaciers > 1 km^{2} (0.386 sq mi or 247 acres) and river estuaries.

La Cassagne (French pronunciation: [la kasaɲ]; Occitan: La Cassanha) is a commune in the Dordogne department in Nouvelle-Aquitaine in southwestern France.

== Population ==
Historical population
Year	Pop.	±% p.a.
1968	132	—
1975	113	−2.20%
1982	112	−0.13%
1990	120	+0.87%
1999	123	+0.27%
2007	150	+2.51%
2012	154	+0.53%
2017	151	−0.39%
2023	149	−0.22%
Source: INSEE

== See also ==
- Communes of the Dordogne department
