= Grèzes, Dordogne =

Grèzes
- Part of Les Coteaux Périgourdins
- Location of Grèzes
- Location within France Location within Nouvelle-Aquitaine
- Coordinates: 45°06′15″N 1°22′02″E
- Country: France
- Region: Nouvelle-Aquitaine
- Department: Dordogne
- Arrondissement: Sarlat-la-Canéda
- Canton: Terrasson-Lavilledieu
- Commune: Les Coteaux Périgourdins
- Area^{1}: 5.88 km^{2} (2.27 sq mi)
- Elevation: 320 m (1,050 ft)
- Highest elevation: 357 m (1,171 ft)
- Lowest elevation: 112 m (367 ft)
- Population (2023): 191
  - Density: 32.5/km^{2} (84.1/sq mi)
- Time zone: UTC+01:00 (CET)
  - Summer (DST): UTC+02:00 (CEST)
- Postal code: 24120
- ^{1} French Land Register data, which excludes lakes, ponds, glaciers > 1 km^{2} (0.386 sq mi or 247 acres) and river estuaries.

Grèzes (French pronunciation: [ɡʁɛz]; Occitan: Gresas) is a former commune in the Dordogne department in Nouvelle-Aquitaine in southwestern France. On 1 January 2017, it was merged into the new commune Les Coteaux Périgourdins.

== See also ==
- Communes of the Dordogne department
