= La Dornac =

- Commune
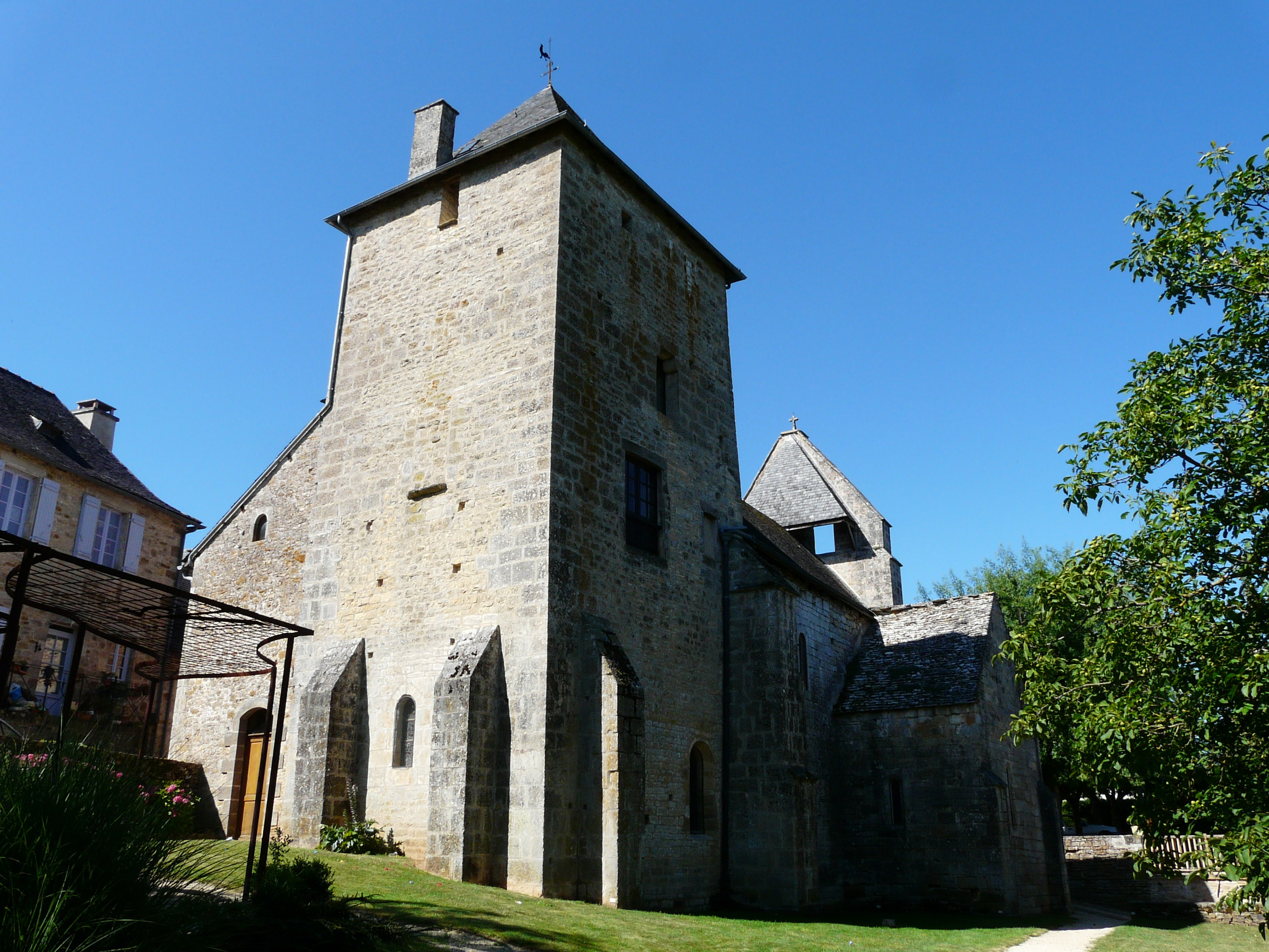
- The church in La Dornac
- Location of La Dornac
- Location within France Location within Nouvelle-Aquitaine
- Coordinates: 45°04′58″N 1°21′38″E
- Country: France
- Region: Nouvelle-Aquitaine
- Department: Dordogne
- Arrondissement: Sarlat-la-Canéda
- Canton: Terrasson-Lavilledieu
- Intercommunality: Terrassonnais en Périgord Noir Thenon Hautefort

Government
  - Mayor (2020–2026): Jean-Pierre Verdier
- Area^{1}: 15.86 km^{2} (6.12 sq mi)
- Elevation: 300 m (980 ft)
- Highest elevation: 324 m (1,063 ft)
- Lowest elevation: 136 m (446 ft)
- Population (2023): 407
  - Density: 25.7/km^{2} (66.5/sq mi)
- Time zone: UTC+01:00 (CET)
  - Summer (DST): UTC+02:00 (CEST)
- INSEE/Postal code: 24153 /24120
- ^{1} French Land Register data, which excludes lakes, ponds, glaciers > 1 km^{2} (0.386 sq mi or 247 acres) and river estuaries.

La Dornac (French pronunciation: [la dɔʁnak]; Occitan: Ladornac) is a commune in the Dordogne department in Nouvelle-Aquitaine in southwestern France.

== Population ==
Historical population
| Year | Pop. | ±% p.a. |
|---|---|---|
| 1968 | 301 | — |
| 1975 | 268 | −1.65% |
| 1982 | 261 | −0.38% |
| 1990 | 266 | +0.24% |
| 1999 | 302 | +1.42% |
| 2007 | 374 | +2.71% |
| 2012 | 414 | +2.05% |
| 2017 | 397 | −0.84% |
| 2023 | 407 | +0.42% |
Source: INSEE

== See also ==
- Communes of the Dordogne department
