= Simeyrols =

- Commune
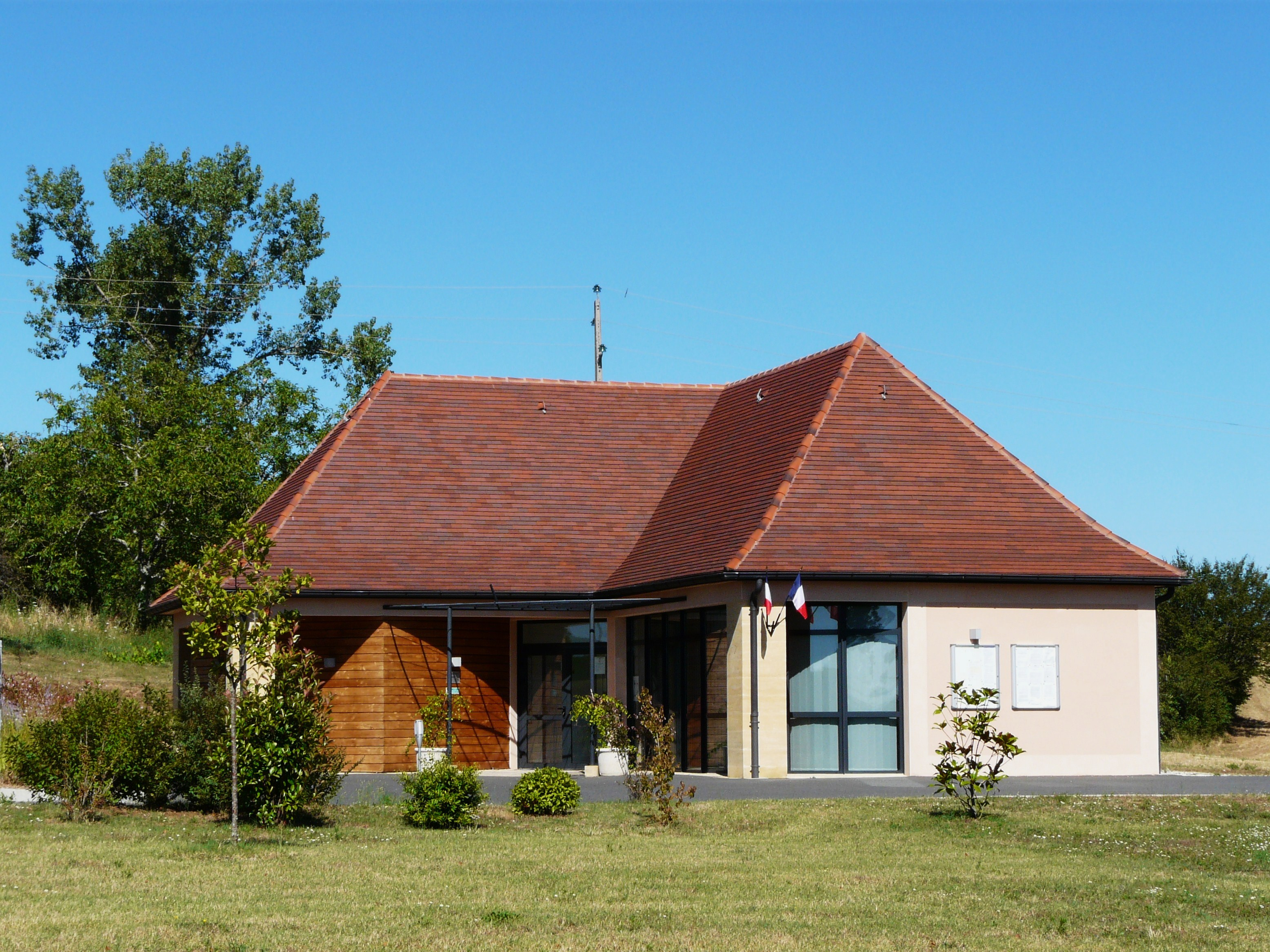
- The town hall in Simeyrols

- Coat of arms
- Location of Simeyrols
- Location within France Location within Nouvelle-Aquitaine
- Coordinates: 44°54′28″N 1°20′23″E
- Country: France
- Region: Nouvelle-Aquitaine
- Department: Dordogne
- Arrondissement: Sarlat-la-Canéda
- Canton: Terrasson-Lavilledieu

Government
  - Mayor (2020–2026): Jean-Pierre Planche
- Area^{1}: 9.26 km^{2} (3.58 sq mi)
- Elevation: 200 m (660 ft)
- Highest elevation: 286 m (938 ft)
- Lowest elevation: 134 m (440 ft)
- Population (2023): 256
  - Density: 27.6/km^{2} (71.6/sq mi)
- Time zone: UTC+01:00 (CET)
  - Summer (DST): UTC+02:00 (CEST)
- INSEE/Postal code: 24535 /24370
- ^{1} French Land Register data, which excludes lakes, ponds, glaciers > 1 km^{2} (0.386 sq mi or 247 acres) and river estuaries.

Simeyrols is a commune in the Dordogne department in Nouvelle-Aquitaine in southwestern France.

== Population ==
Historical population
Year	Pop.	±% p.a.
1968	160	—
1975	180	+1.70%
1982	162	−1.49%
1990	185	+1.67%
1999	189	+0.24%
2007	221	+1.97%
2012	255	+2.90%
2017	258	+0.23%
2023	256	−0.13%
Source: INSEE

== See also ==
- Communes of the Dordogne département
