= Prats-de-Carlux =

- Commune
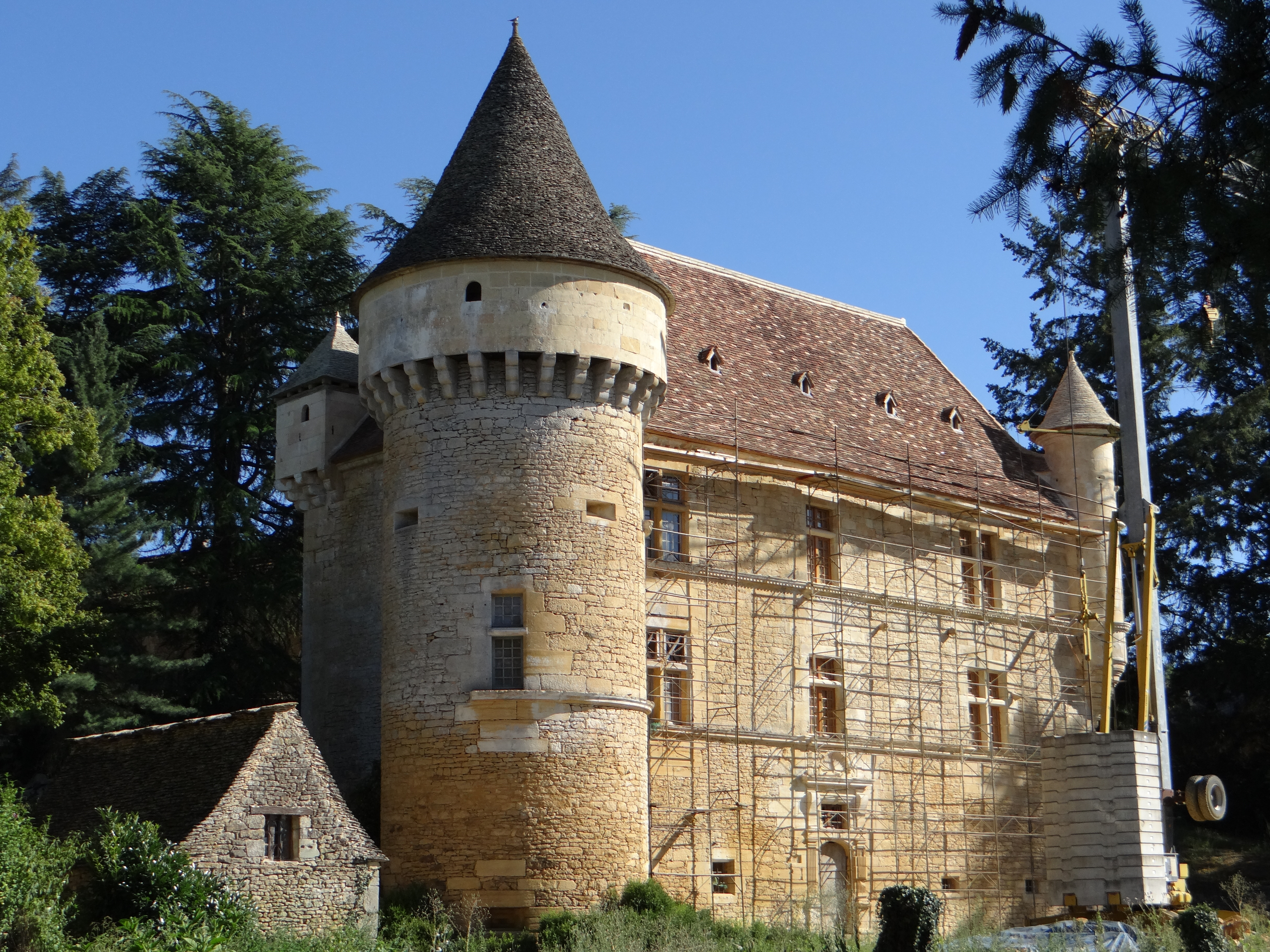
- Chateau of Le Sirey

- Coat of arms
- Location of Prats-de-Carlux
- Location within France Location within Nouvelle-Aquitaine
- Coordinates: 44°54′27″N 1°19′02″E
- Country: France
- Region: Nouvelle-Aquitaine
- Department: Dordogne
- Arrondissement: Sarlat-la-Canéda
- Canton: Terrasson-Lavilledieu

Government
  - Mayor (2020–2026): Jean-Michel Barreau
- Area^{1}: 13.00 km^{2} (5.02 sq mi)
- Elevation: 145 m (476 ft)
- Highest elevation: 248 m (814 ft)
- Lowest elevation: 97 m (318 ft)
- Population (2023): 491
  - Density: 37.8/km^{2} (97.8/sq mi)
- Time zone: UTC+01:00 (CET)
  - Summer (DST): UTC+02:00 (CEST)
- INSEE/Postal code: 24336 /24370
- ^{1} French Land Register data, which excludes lakes, ponds, glaciers > 1 km^{2} (0.386 sq mi or 247 acres) and river estuaries.

Prats-de-Carlux (French pronunciation: [pʁa də kaʁly]; Occitan: Prats de Carluç) is a commune in the Dordogne department in Nouvelle-Aquitaine in southwestern France.

== Population ==
Historical population
| Year | Pop. | ±% p.a. |
|---|---|---|
| 1968 | 354 | — |
| 1975 | 323 | −1.30% |
| 1982 | 437 | +4.41% |
| 1990 | 420 | −0.49% |
| 1999 | 420 | +0.00% |
| 2007 | 506 | +2.36% |
| 2012 | 515 | +0.35% |
| 2017 | 547 | +1.21% |
| 2023 | 491 | −1.78% |
Source: INSEE

== See also ==
- Communes of the Dordogne department
