= Saint-Crépin-et-Carlucet =

- Commune
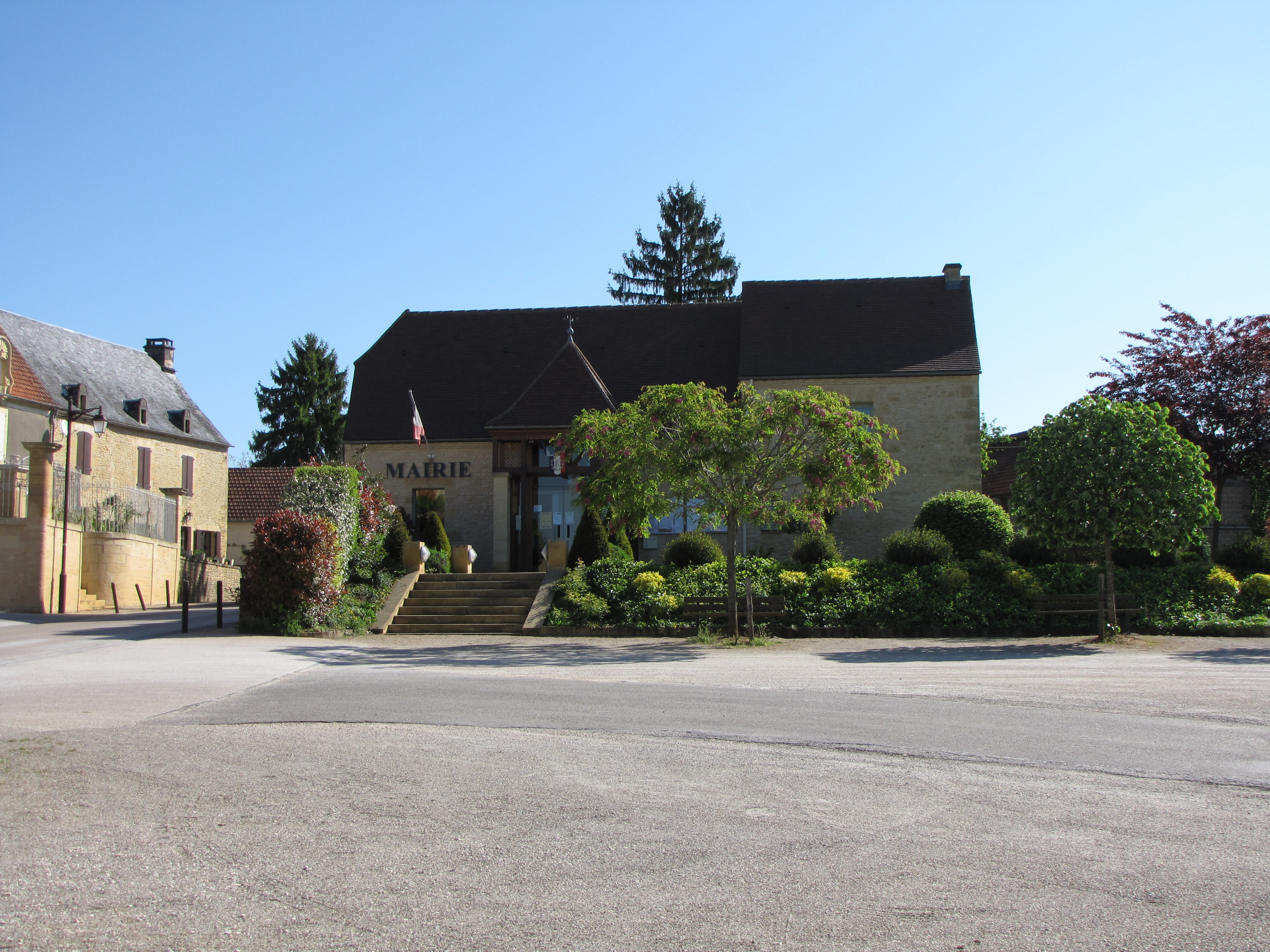
- The town hall in Saint-Crépin-et-Carlucet

- Coat of arms
- Location of Saint-Crépin-et-Carlucet
- Location within France Location within Nouvelle-Aquitaine
- Coordinates: 44°57′53″N 1°16′30″E
- Country: France
- Region: Nouvelle-Aquitaine
- Department: Dordogne
- Arrondissement: Sarlat-la-Canéda
- Canton: Terrasson-Lavilledieu

Government
  - Mayor (2020–2026): Alain Vilatte
- Area^{1}: 18.51 km^{2} (7.15 sq mi)
- Elevation: 270 m (890 ft)
- Highest elevation: 303 m (994 ft)
- Lowest elevation: 141 m (463 ft)
- Population (2023): 536
  - Density: 29.0/km^{2} (75.0/sq mi)
- Time zone: UTC+01:00 (CET)
  - Summer (DST): UTC+02:00 (CEST)
- INSEE/Postal code: 24392 /24590
- ^{1} French Land Register data, which excludes lakes, ponds, glaciers > 1 km^{2} (0.386 sq mi or 247 acres) and river estuaries.

Saint-Crépin-et-Carlucet (French pronunciation: [sɛ̃ kʁepɛ̃ e kaʁlysɛ]; Occitan: Sent Crespin e Carlucet) is a commune in the Dordogne department in Nouvelle-Aquitaine in southwestern France.

== Population ==
Historical population
Year	Pop.	±% p.a.
1968	331	—
1975	321	−0.44%
1982	310	−0.50%
1990	372	+2.31%
1999	407	+1.00%
2007	486	+2.24%
2012	531	+1.79%
2017	520	−0.42%
2023	536	+0.51%
Source: INSEE

== See also ==
- Communes of the Dordogne department
