= Carlux =

- Commune
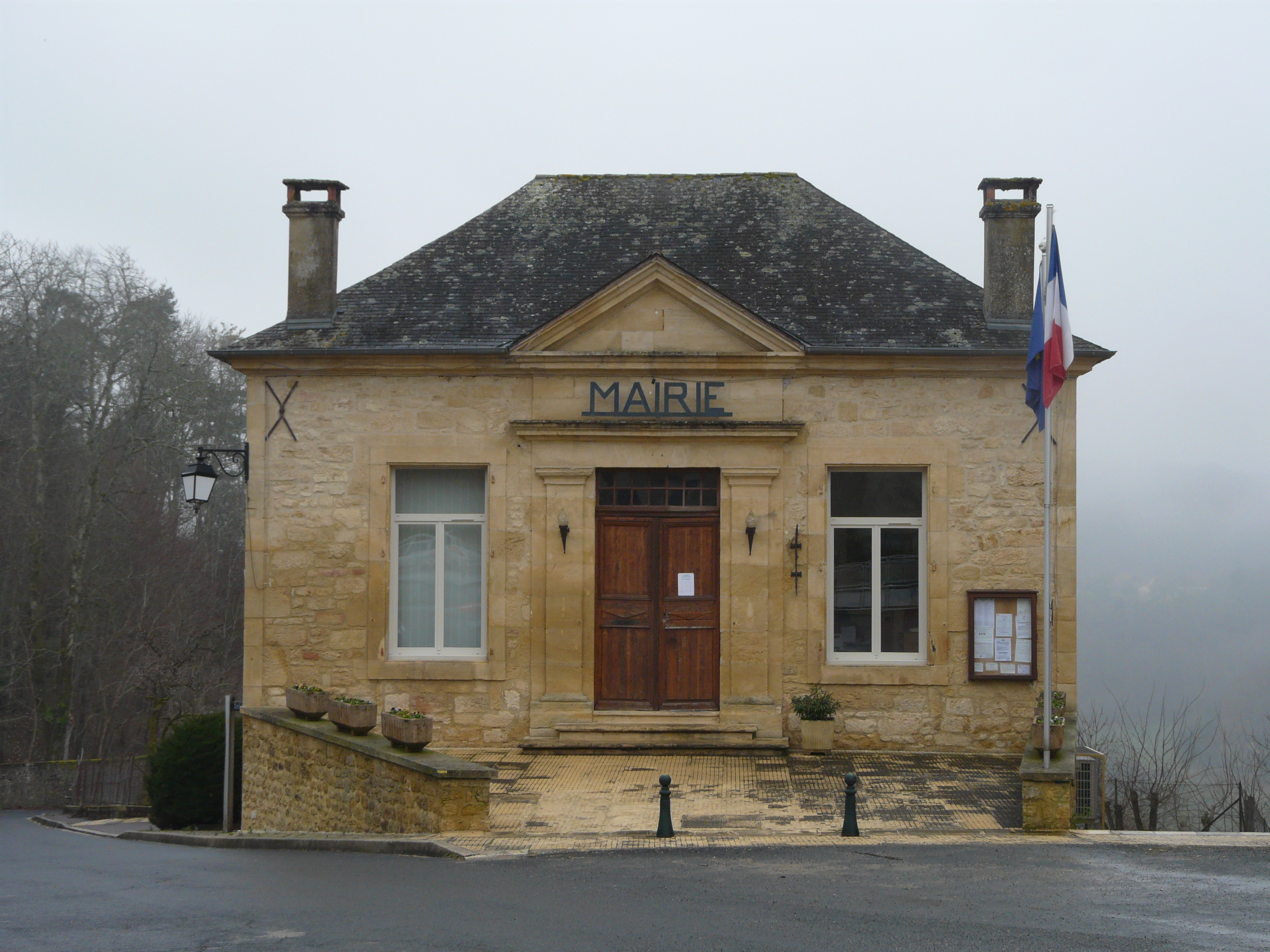
- The town hall in Carlux

- Coat of arms
- Location of Carlux
- Location within France Location within Nouvelle-Aquitaine
- Coordinates: 44°53′05″N 1°21′15″E
- Country: France
- Region: Nouvelle-Aquitaine
- Department: Dordogne
- Arrondissement: Sarlat-la-Canéda
- Canton: Terrasson-Lavilledieu

Government
  - Mayor (2020–2026): André Alard
- Area^{1}: 13.31 km^{2} (5.14 sq mi)
- Elevation: 187 m (614 ft)
- Highest elevation: 254 m (833 ft)
- Lowest elevation: 78 m (256 ft)
- Population (2023): 671
  - Density: 50.4/km^{2} (131/sq mi)
- Time zone: UTC+01:00 (CET)
  - Summer (DST): UTC+02:00 (CEST)
- INSEE/Postal code: 24081 /24370
- ^{1} French Land Register data, which excludes lakes, ponds, glaciers > 1 km^{2} (0.386 sq mi or 247 acres) and river estuaries.

Carlux (French pronunciation: [kaʁly]; Occitan: Carluç) is a commune in the Dordogne department in Nouvelle-Aquitaine in southwestern France.

== Population ==
Historical population
Year	Pop.	±% p.a.
1968	549	—
1975	514	−0.94%
1982	565	+1.36%
1990	594	+0.63%
1999	624	+0.55%
2007	642	+0.36%
2012	635	−0.22%
2017	629	−0.19%
2023	671	+1.08%
Source: INSEE

The village of Carlux has a centrally located 'bourg' (fortification ruin) that dates back to the 12th century, which is currently (June 2013) in the process of repair/restoration, and many other clearly historically and/or architecturally interesting buildings.

As of June 2013, it has a bakery (boulangerie), a butcher/caterer (boucher/traiteur) and a grocery store (épicerie), plus three restaurants (one first class, one very nice if simple and another which claims to be a peasant 'halle'). All seem to be well frequented.

Also located in just outside the village is the Domaine des Bequignolles, a quality chocolate factory with a direct sale (vente directe) counter.

Tha annual village festival (fête) is normally the weekend of the first week in June.

== Notable people ==
- Pierre-Paul Grassé (1895–1985), zoologist, died in Carlux

== See also ==
- Communes of the Dordogne department
