= Borrèze =

- Commune
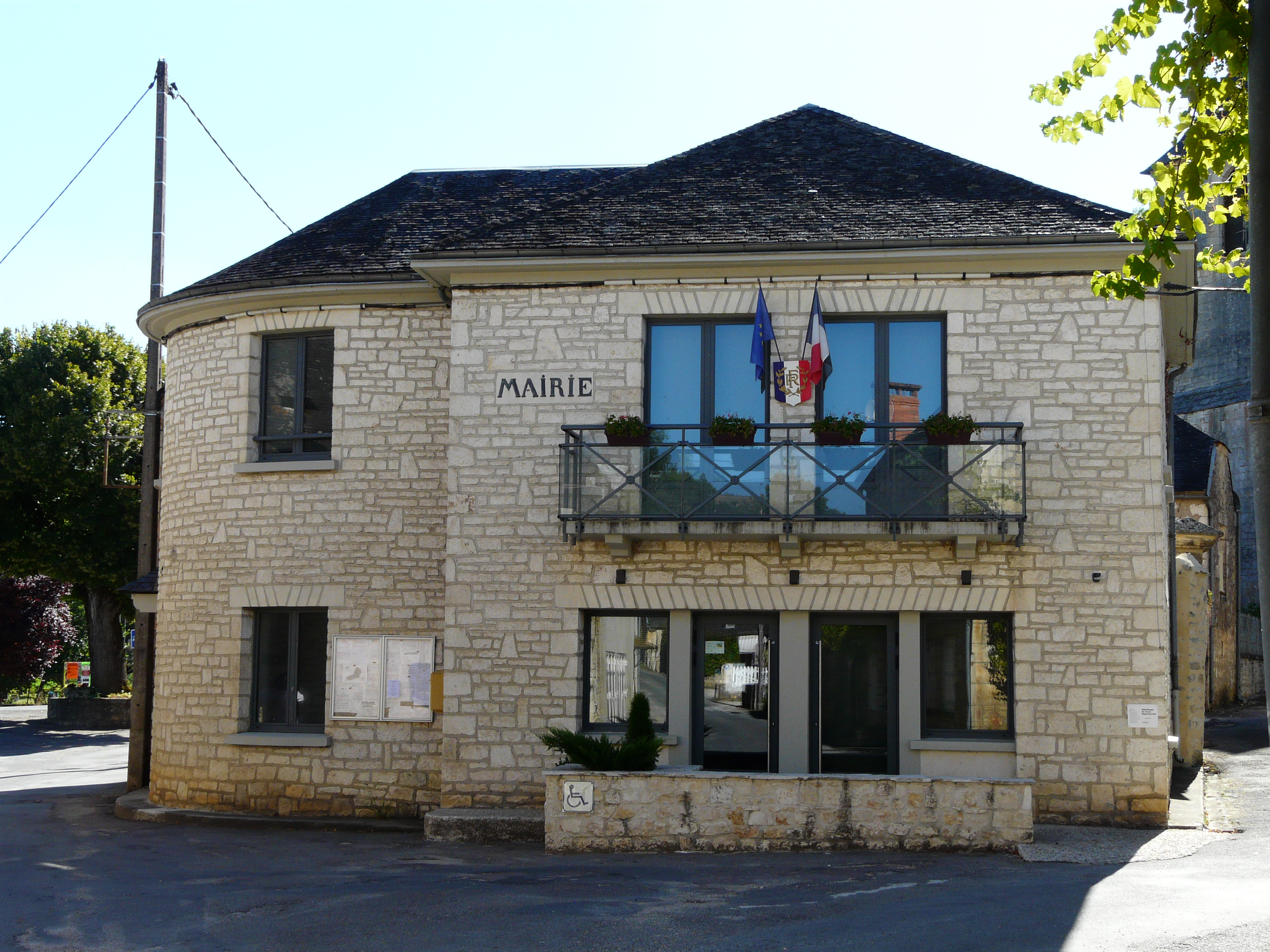
- The town hall in Borrèze

- Coat of arms
- Location of Borrèze
- Location within France Location within Nouvelle-Aquitaine
- Coordinates: 44°57′20″N 1°23′21″E
- Country: France
- Region: Nouvelle-Aquitaine
- Department: Dordogne
- Arrondissement: Sarlat-la-Canéda
- Canton: Terrasson-Lavilledieu

Government
  - Mayor (2020–2026): Thierry Chassaing
- Area^{1}: 27.37 km^{2} (10.57 sq mi)
- Elevation: 150 m (490 ft)
- Highest elevation: 348 m (1,142 ft)
- Lowest elevation: 120 m (390 ft)
- Population (2023): 354
  - Density: 12.9/km^{2} (33.5/sq mi)
- Time zone: UTC+01:00 (CET)
  - Summer (DST): UTC+02:00 (CEST)
- INSEE/Postal code: 24050 /24590
- ^{1} French Land Register data, which excludes lakes, ponds, glaciers > 1 km^{2} (0.386 sq mi or 247 acres) and river estuaries.

Borrèze (French pronunciation: [bɔʁɛz]; Occitan: Boresa) is a commune in the Dordogne department in southwestern France.

== Population ==
Historical population
Year	Pop.	±% p.a.
1968	398	—
1975	356	−1.58%
1982	331	−1.03%
1990	305	−1.02%
1999	303	−0.07%
2007	350	+1.82%
2012	347	−0.17%
2017	342	−0.29%
2023	354	+0.58%
Source: INSEE

== See also ==
- Communes of the Dordogne département
