= Jayac =

- Commune
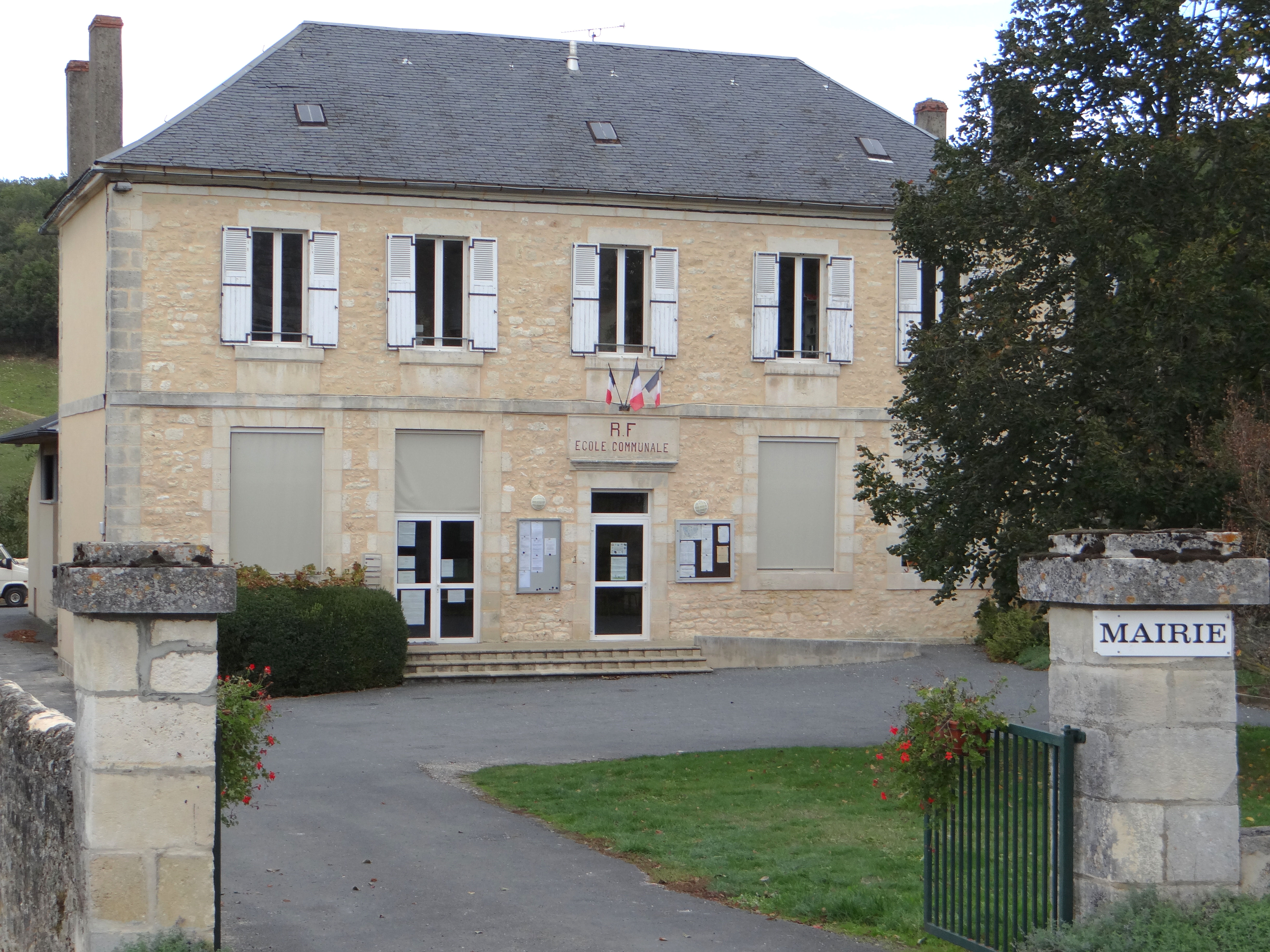
- Town hall
- Location of Jayac
- Location within France Location within Nouvelle-Aquitaine
- Coordinates: 45°01′55″N 1°20′41″E
- Country: France
- Region: Nouvelle-Aquitaine
- Department: Dordogne
- Arrondissement: Sarlat-la-Canéda
- Canton: Terrasson-Lavilledieu

Government
  - Mayor (2020–2026): Francis Jagourd
- Area^{1}: 17.77 km^{2} (6.86 sq mi)
- Elevation: 258 m (846 ft)
- Highest elevation: 338 m (1,109 ft)
- Lowest elevation: 173 m (568 ft)
- Population (2023): 191
  - Density: 10.7/km^{2} (27.8/sq mi)
- Time zone: UTC+01:00 (CET)
  - Summer (DST): UTC+02:00 (CEST)
- INSEE/Postal code: 24215 /24590
- ^{1} French Land Register data, which excludes lakes, ponds, glaciers > 1 km^{2} (0.386 sq mi or 247 acres) and river estuaries.

Jayac (French pronunciation: [ʒajak]; Occitan: Jaiac) is a commune in the Dordogne department in Nouvelle-Aquitaine in southwestern France.

== Population ==
Historical population
Year	Pop.	±% p.a.
1968	264	—
1975	248	−0.89%
1982	219	−1.76%
1990	194	−1.50%
1999	180	−0.83%
2007	186	+0.41%
2012	181	−0.54%
2017	175	−0.67%
2023	191	+1.47%
Source: INSEE

== See also ==
- Communes of the Dordogne department
