= Paulin, Dordogne =

Paulin
- Commune
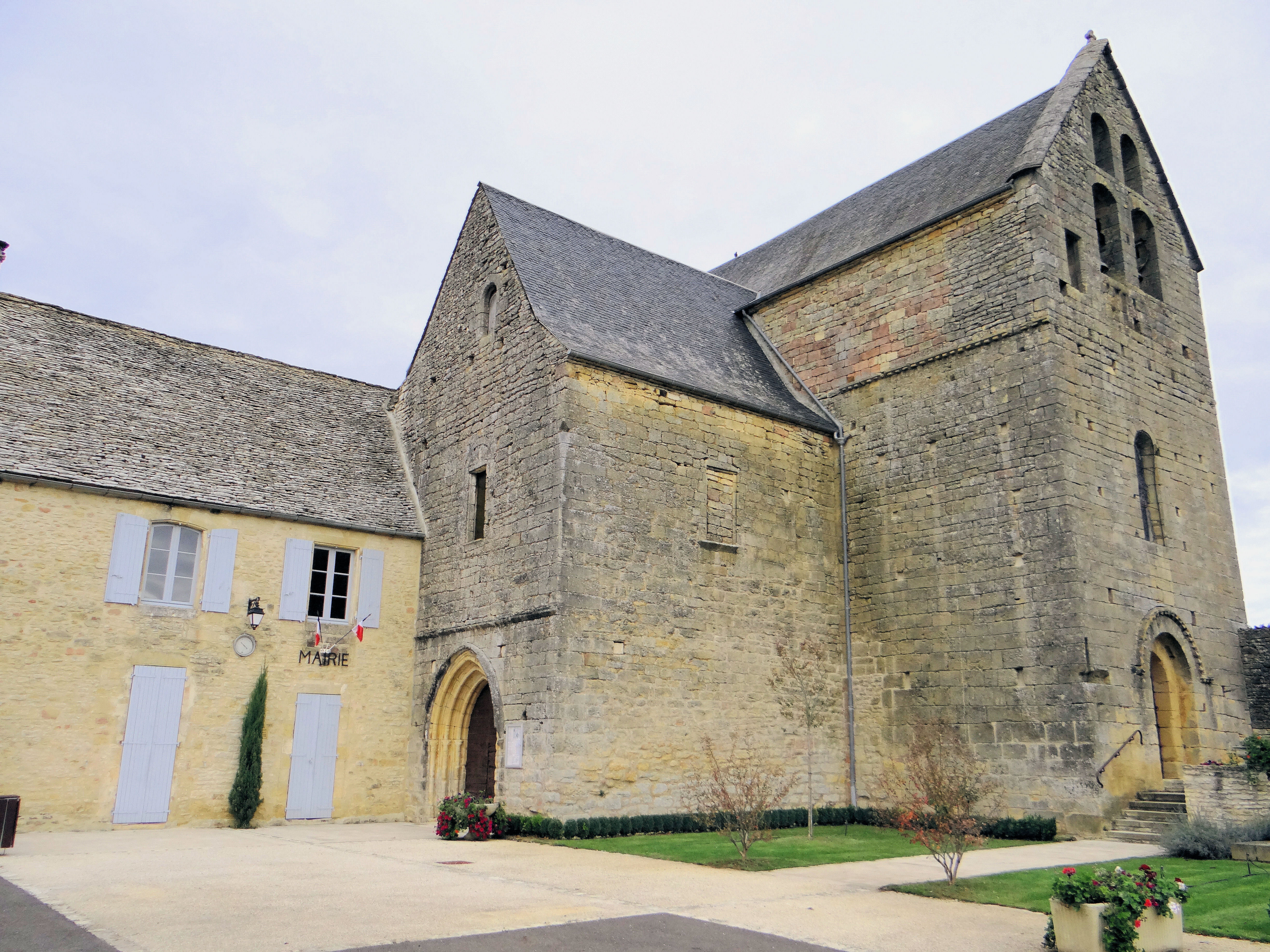
- The town hall and church in Paulin
- Location of Paulin
- Location within France Location within Nouvelle-Aquitaine
- Coordinates: 45°00′10″N 1°20′54″E
- Country: France
- Region: Nouvelle-Aquitaine
- Department: Dordogne
- Arrondissement: Sarlat-la-Canéda
- Canton: Terrasson-Lavilledieu

Government
  - Mayor (2020–2026): Michel Mariel
- Area^{1}: 11.43 km^{2} (4.41 sq mi)
- Elevation: 200 m (660 ft)
- Population (2023): 246
  - Density: 21.5/km^{2} (55.7/sq mi)
- Time zone: UTC+01:00 (CET)
  - Summer (DST): UTC+02:00 (CEST)
- INSEE/Postal code: 24317 /24590
- ^{1} French Land Register data, which excludes lakes, ponds, glaciers > 1 km^{2} (0.386 sq mi or 247 acres) and river estuaries.

Paulin (French pronunciation: [polɛ̃]; Occitan: Paulinh) is a commune in the Dordogne department in Nouvelle-Aquitaine in southwestern France.

== Population ==
Historical population
Year	Pop.	±% p.a.
1968	346	—
1975	293	−2.35%
1982	269	−1.21%
1990	258	−0.52%
1999	268	+0.42%
2007	274	+0.28%
2012	273	−0.07%
2017	259	−1.05%
2023	246	−0.85%
Source: INSEE

== See also ==
- Communes of the Dordogne department
