= Calviac-en-Périgord =

- Commune
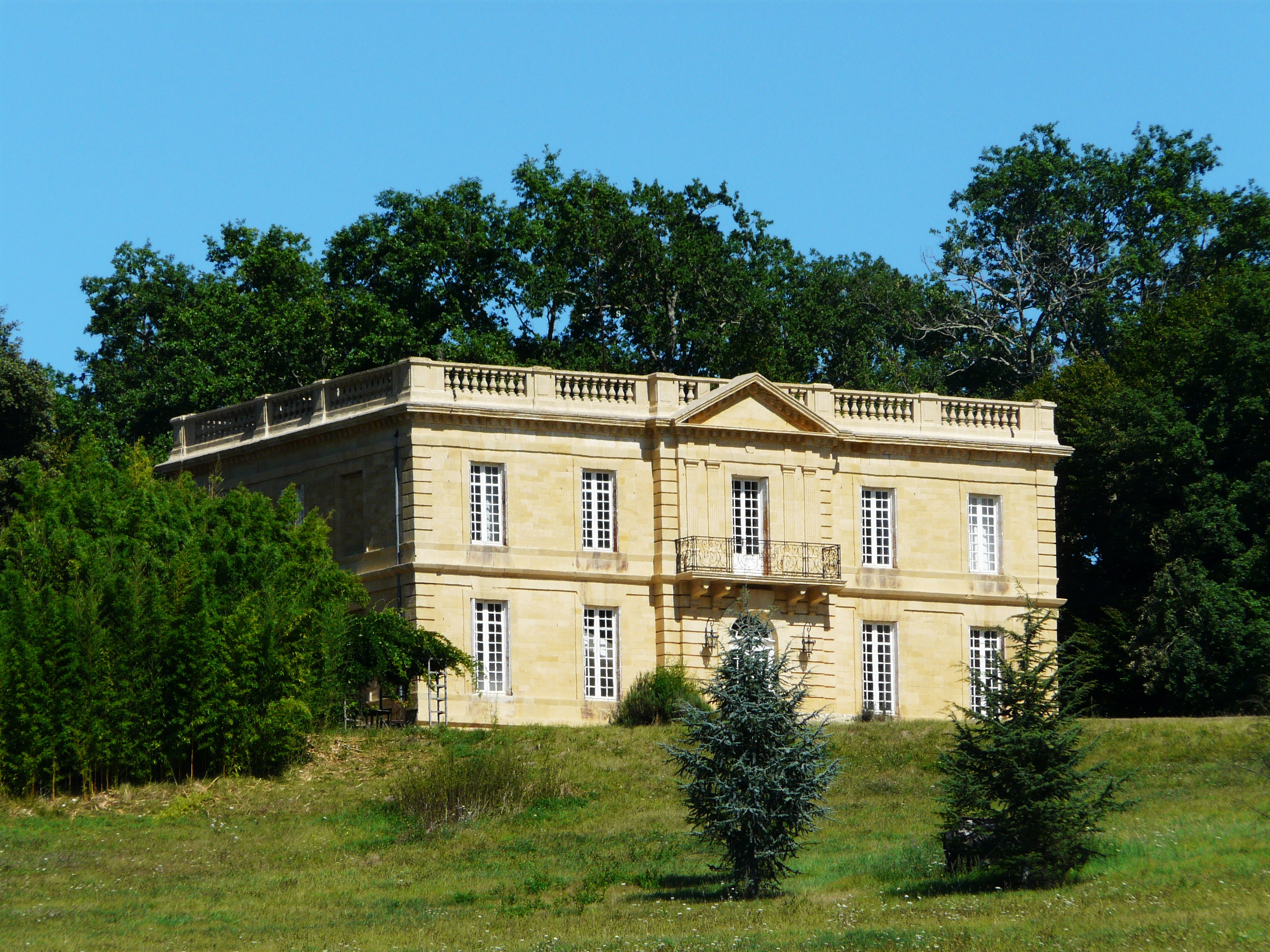
- Chateau
- Location of Calviac-en-Périgord
- Location within France Location within Nouvelle-Aquitaine
- Coordinates: 44°51′20″N 1°20′03″E
- Country: France
- Region: Nouvelle-Aquitaine
- Department: Dordogne
- Arrondissement: Sarlat-la-Canéda
- Canton: Terrasson-Lavilledieu
- Intercommunality: Pays de Fénelon

Government
  - Mayor (2020–2026): Jean-Paul Ségalat
- Area^{1}: 14.52 km^{2} (5.61 sq mi)
- Elevation: 86 m (282 ft)
- Highest elevation: 245 m (804 ft)
- Lowest elevation: 60 m (200 ft)
- Population (2023): 546
  - Density: 37.6/km^{2} (97.4/sq mi)
- Time zone: UTC+01:00 (CET)
  - Summer (DST): UTC+02:00 (CEST)
- INSEE/Postal code: 24074 /24370
- ^{1} French Land Register data, which excludes lakes, ponds, glaciers > 1 km^{2} (0.386 sq mi or 247 acres) and river estuaries.

Calviac-en-Périgord (French pronunciation: [kalvjak ɑ̃ peʁiɡɔʁ], literally Calviac in Périgord; Occitan: Calviac de Perigòrd) is a commune of the Dordogne department in Nouvelle-Aquitaine and is situated in southwest France.

== Population ==
Historical population
Year	Pop.	±% p.a.
1968	406	—
1975	404	−0.07%
1982	425	+0.73%
1990	441	+0.46%
1999	468	+0.66%
2007	514	+1.18%
2012	483	−1.24%
2017	510	+1.09%
2023	546	+1.14%
Source: INSEE

== See also ==
- Communes of the Dordogne department
