= Nadaillac =

- Commune
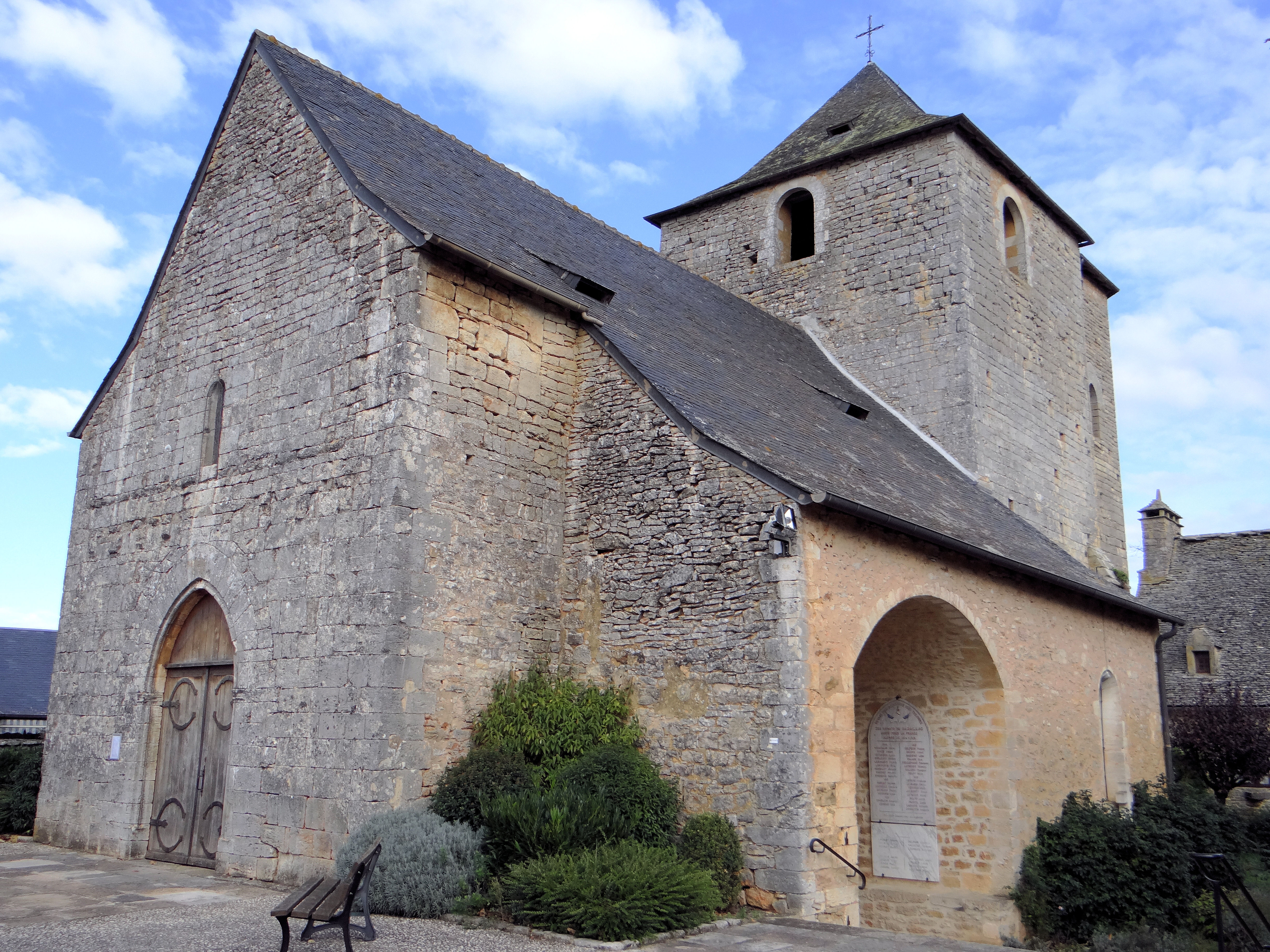
- The church in Nadaillac

- Coat of arms
- Location of Nadaillac
- Location within France Location within Nouvelle-Aquitaine
- Coordinates: 45°02′23″N 1°23′55″E
- Country: France
- Region: Nouvelle-Aquitaine
- Department: Dordogne
- Arrondissement: Sarlat-la-Canéda
- Canton: Terrasson-Lavilledieu
- Intercommunality: Pays de Fénelon

Government
  - Mayor (2020–2026): Jean-Claude Veyssière
- Area^{1}: 26.90 km^{2} (10.39 sq mi)
- Elevation: 205 m (673 ft)
- Highest elevation: 351 m (1,152 ft)
- Lowest elevation: 193 m (633 ft)
- Population (2023): 372
  - Density: 13.8/km^{2} (35.8/sq mi)
- Time zone: UTC+01:00 (CET)
  - Summer (DST): UTC+02:00 (CEST)
- INSEE/Postal code: 24301 /24590
- ^{1} French Land Register data, which excludes lakes, ponds, glaciers > 1 km^{2} (0.386 sq mi or 247 acres) and river estuaries.

Nadaillac (French pronunciation: [nadajak]; Occitan: Nadalhac) is a commune in the Dordogne department in Nouvelle-Aquitaine in southwestern France.

== Population ==
Historical population
Year	Pop.	±% p.a.
1968	308	—
1975	296	−0.57%
1982	304	+0.38%
1990	285	−0.80%
1999	341	+2.01%
2007	339	−0.07%
2012	341	+0.12%
2017	376	+1.97%
2023	372	−0.18%
Source: INSEE

== See also ==
- Communes of the Dordogne department
