= Archignac =

- Commune
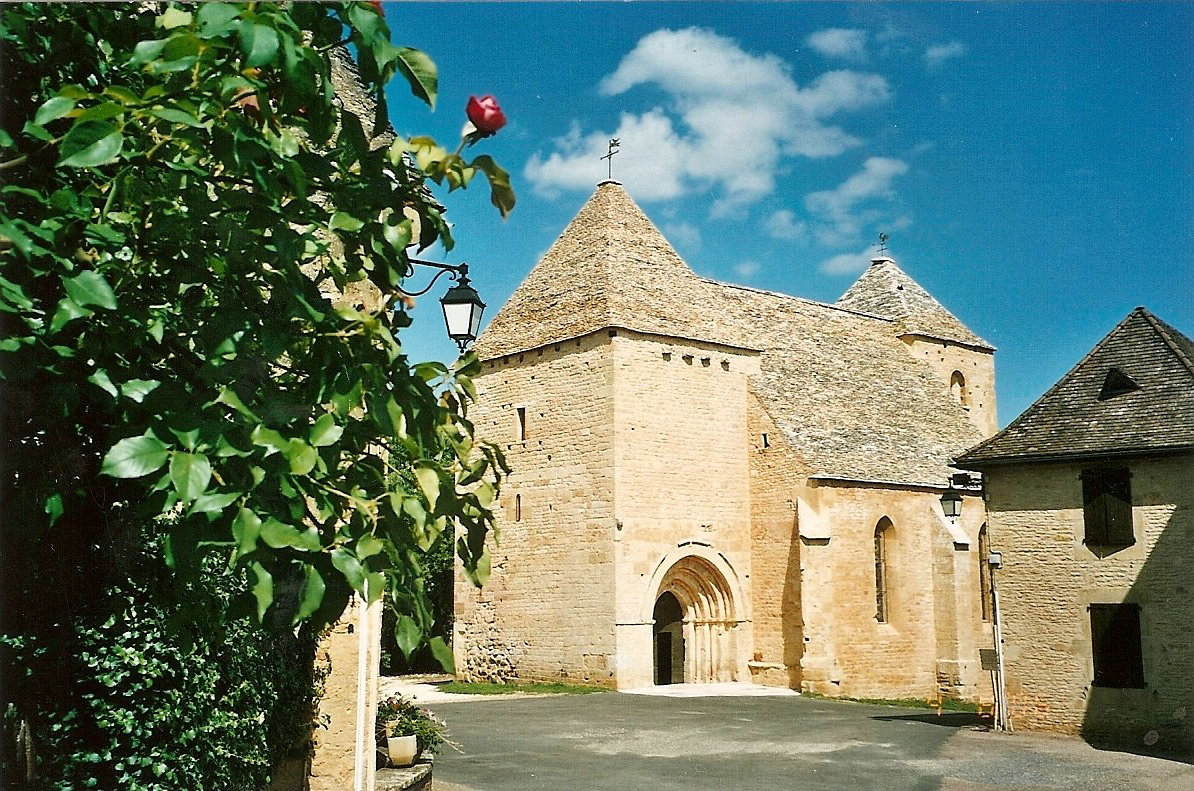
- The church in Archignac
- Location of Archignac
- Location within France Location within Nouvelle-Aquitaine
- Coordinates: 45°00′43″N 1°18′46″E
- Country: France
- Region: Nouvelle-Aquitaine
- Department: Dordogne
- Arrondissement: Sarlat-la-Canéda
- Canton: Terrasson-Lavilledieu

Government
  - Mayor (2020–2026): Alain Laporte
- Area^{1}: 22.90 km^{2} (8.84 sq mi)
- Elevation: 300 m (980 ft)
- Highest elevation: 323 m (1,060 ft)
- Lowest elevation: 157 m (515 ft)
- Population (2023): 409
  - Density: 17.9/km^{2} (46.3/sq mi)
- Time zone: UTC+01:00 (CET)
  - Summer (DST): UTC+02:00 (CEST)
- INSEE/Postal code: 24012 /24590
- ^{1} French Land Register data, which excludes lakes, ponds, glaciers > 1 km^{2} (0.386 sq mi or 247 acres) and river estuaries.

Archignac (French pronunciation: [aʁʃiɲak]; Occitan: Archinhac) is a commune in the Dordogne department in Nouvelle-Aquitaine in southwestern France.

== Population ==
Historical population
Year	Pop.	±% p.a.
1968	352	—
1975	318	−1.44%
1982	309	−0.41%
1990	302	−0.29%
1999	297	−0.19%
2007	328	+1.25%
2012	337	+0.54%
2017	363	+1.50%
2023	409	+2.01%
Source: INSEE

== See also ==
- Communes of the Dordogne department
