= Veyrignac =

- Commune
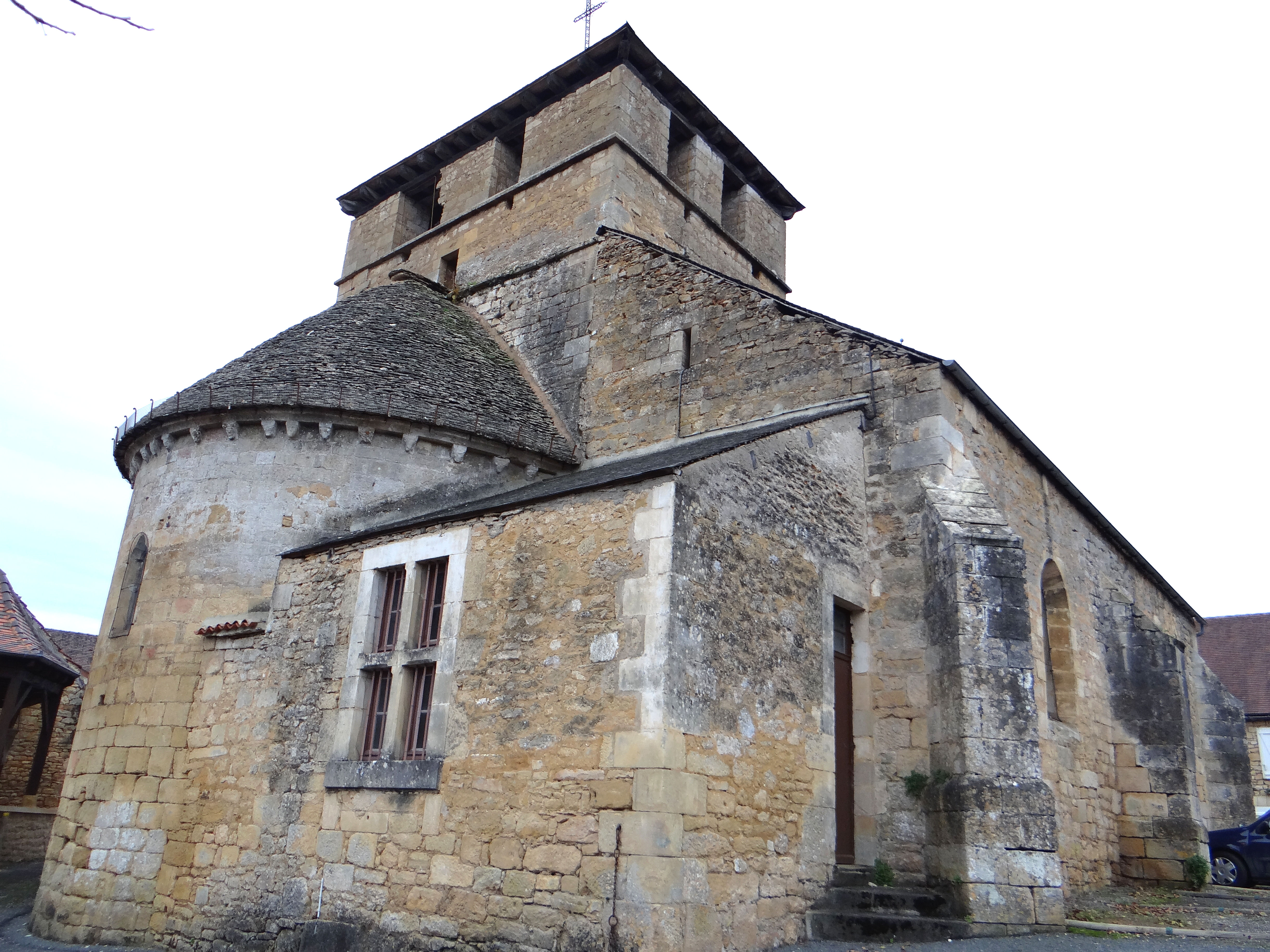
- The church in Veyrignac
- Location of Veyrignac
- Location within France Location within Nouvelle-Aquitaine
- Coordinates: 44°49′59″N 1°18′37″E
- Country: France
- Region: Nouvelle-Aquitaine
- Department: Dordogne
- Arrondissement: Sarlat-la-Canéda
- Canton: Terrasson-Lavilledieu
- Intercommunality: Pays de Fénelon

Government
  - Mayor (2020–2026): Lisette Gendre
- Area^{1}: 9.54 km^{2} (3.68 sq mi)
- Elevation: 123 m (404 ft)
- Highest elevation: 217 m (712 ft)
- Lowest elevation: 60 m (200 ft)
- Population (2023): 326
  - Density: 34.2/km^{2} (88.5/sq mi)
- Time zone: UTC+01:00 (CET)
  - Summer (DST): UTC+02:00 (CEST)
- INSEE/Postal code: 24574 /24370
- ^{1} French Land Register data, which excludes lakes, ponds, glaciers > 1 km^{2} (0.386 sq mi or 247 acres) and river estuaries.

Veyrignac (French pronunciation: [veʁiɲak]; Occitan: Veirinhac) is a commune in the Dordogne department in Nouvelle-Aquitaine in southwestern France.

== Population ==
Historical population
| Year | Pop. | ±% p.a. |
|---|---|---|
| 1968 | 221 | — |
| 1975 | 222 | +0.06% |
| 1982 | 233 | +0.69% |
| 1990 | 213 | −1.12% |
| 1999 | 233 | +1.00% |
| 2007 | 292 | +2.86% |
| 2012 | 330 | +2.48% |
| 2017 | 335 | +0.30% |
| 2023 | 326 | −0.45% |
Source: INSEE

== See also ==
- Communes of the Dordogne department
