= Les Coteaux Périgourdins =

- Commune
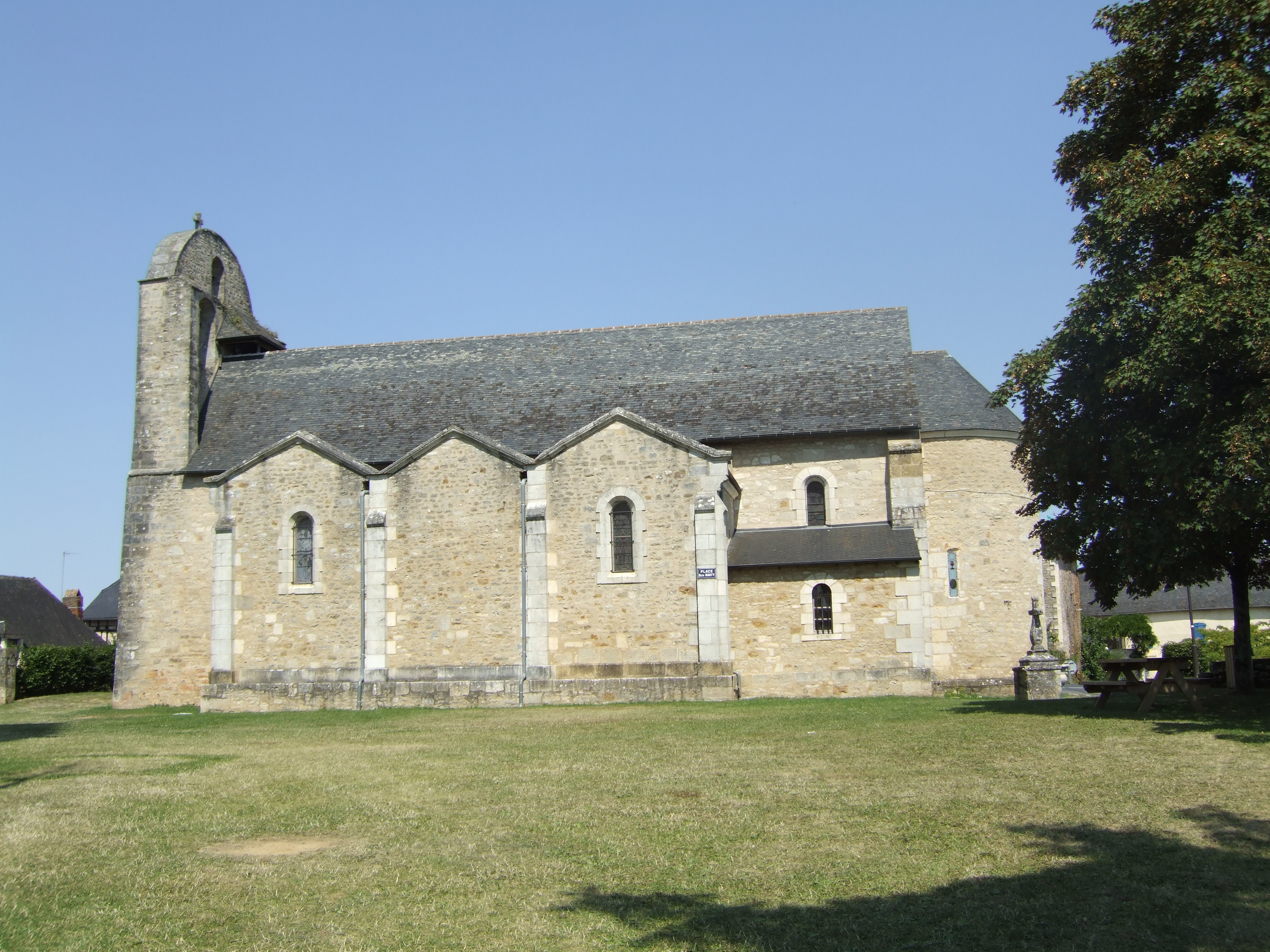
- The church in Chavagnac
- Location of Les Coteaux Périgourdins
- Location within France Location within Nouvelle-Aquitaine
- Coordinates: 45°05′24″N 1°22′23″E
- Country: France
- Region: Nouvelle-Aquitaine
- Department: Dordogne
- Arrondissement: Sarlat-la-Canéda
- Canton: Terrasson-Lavilledieu
- Intercommunality: Terrassonnais en Périgord noir Thenon Hautefort

Government
  - Mayor (2020–2026): Jean-Marie Chanquoi
- Area^{1}: 19.47 km^{2} (7.52 sq mi)
- Population (2023): 554
  - Density: 28.5/km^{2} (73.7/sq mi)
- Time zone: UTC+01:00 (CET)
  - Summer (DST): UTC+02:00 (CEST)
- INSEE/Postal code: 24117 /24120
- ^{1} French Land Register data, which excludes lakes, ponds, glaciers > 1 km^{2} (0.386 sq mi or 247 acres) and river estuaries.

Les Coteaux Périgourdins (French pronunciation: [le kɔto peʁiɡuʁdɛ̃]; Occitan: Los Termes Perigòrds) is a commune in the department of Dordogne, southwestern France. The municipality was established on 1 January 2017 by merger of the former communes of Chavagnac (the seat) and Grèzes.

== See also ==
- Communes of the Dordogne department
