= Wulfric of Holme =

Tenth-century hermit and saint

Saint Wulfric
- Died: 9 December c. 1020; St Benet's Abbey, East Anglia, England
- Venerated in: Eastern Orthodox Church, Roman Catholic Church, Anglican Communion
- Canonized: Pre-Congregation
- Major shrine: St Benet's Abbey
- Feast: 9 December

Saint Wulfric of Holme (Latin: Wolfeius) was a tenth-century hermit and saint from Norfolk. His feast date is December 9.

After the monastery of St. Benet’s at Holme (founded AD 820 by Saint Suneman) was destroyed by Danes, who massacred Saint Suneman and his fellow monks in 870AD, Saint Wulfric rebuilt the monastery in 960 AD.

He gathered seven other monastics and governed this community for 60 years. Wulfric won the favour of King Cnut whilst living nearby in Horning. Around 1020 King Cnut granted the community his property in Horning and the villages of Ludham and Neatishead, and confirmed his gift in Winchester where Cnut’s official, Maynard, who had previously slandered Wulfric and his companions, is said to have had his neck broken by divine intervention.

A note written by William Worcestre during a visit to the monastery in 1479 states that "the holy Wolfeius, the first hermit of this monastery" was found on the list of those commemorated on the 9th of December.

Saint Wulfric would therefore have died on the 9th of December around c. 1020. He is venerated as a Saint in both the Orthodox Church and the Roman and Protestant churches of the west.
