= Saint-Julien-de-Lampon =

- Commune
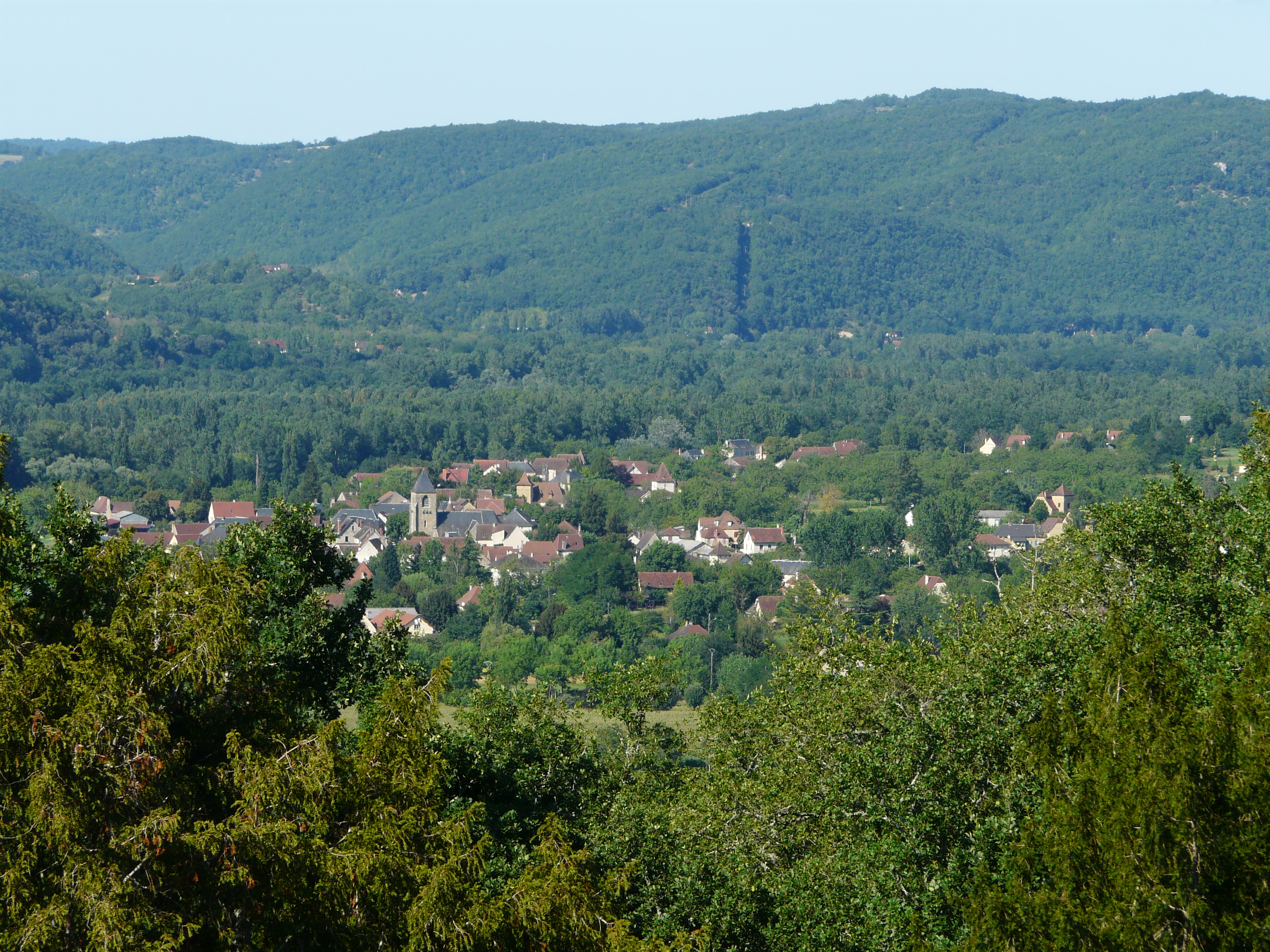
- A general view of Saint-Julien-de-Lampon

- Coat of arms
- Location of Saint-Julien-de-Lampon
- Location within France Location within Nouvelle-Aquitaine
- Coordinates: 44°51′43″N 1°21′50″E
- Country: France
- Region: Nouvelle-Aquitaine
- Department: Dordogne
- Arrondissement: Sarlat-la-Canéda
- Canton: Terrasson-Lavilledieu

Government
  - Mayor (2020–2026): Huguette Villard
- Area^{1}: 13.24 km^{2} (5.11 sq mi)
- Elevation: 80 m (260 ft)
- Highest elevation: 252 m (827 ft)
- Lowest elevation: 62 m (203 ft)
- Population (2023): 660
  - Density: 50/km^{2} (130/sq mi)
- Time zone: UTC+01:00 (CET)
  - Summer (DST): UTC+02:00 (CEST)
- INSEE/Postal code: 24432 /24370
- ^{1} French Land Register data, which excludes lakes, ponds, glaciers > 1 km^{2} (0.386 sq mi or 247 acres) and river estuaries.

Saint-Julien-de-Lampon (French pronunciation: [sɛ̃ ʒyljɛ̃ də lɑ̃pɔ̃]; Occitan: Sent Júlia de Lamponh) is a commune in the Dordogne department in Nouvelle-Aquitaine in southwestern France.

== Population ==
Historical population
Year	Pop.	±% p.a.
1968	516	—
1975	522	+0.17%
1982	552	+0.80%
1990	586	+0.75%
1999	576	−0.19%
2007	590	+0.30%
2012	623	+1.09%
2017	626	+0.10%
2023	660	+0.89%
Source: INSEE

== See also ==
- Communes of the Dordogne department
