= Saint-Geniès, Dordogne =

Saint-Geniès
- Commune
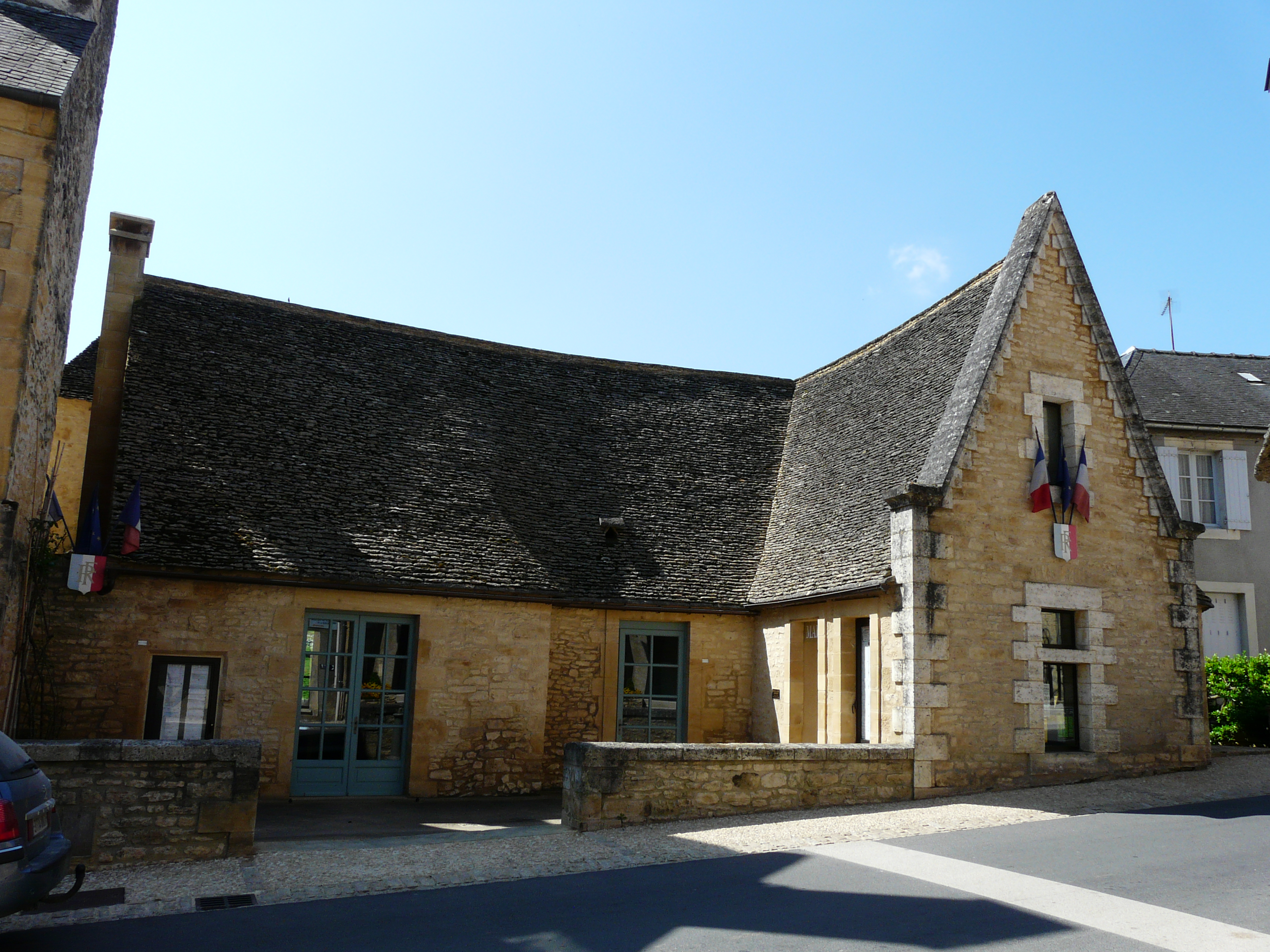
- The town hall in Saint-Geniès

- Coat of arms
- Location of Saint-Geniès
- Location within France Location within Nouvelle-Aquitaine
- Coordinates: 44°59′42″N 1°15′09″E
- Country: France
- Region: Nouvelle-Aquitaine
- Department: Dordogne
- Arrondissement: Sarlat-la-Canéda
- Canton: Terrasson-Lavilledieu

Government
  - Mayor (2020–2026): Michel Lajugie
- Area^{1}: 33.59 km^{2} (12.97 sq mi)
- Elevation: 222 m (728 ft)
- Highest elevation: 303 m (994 ft)
- Lowest elevation: 149 m (489 ft)
- Population (2023): 926
  - Density: 27.6/km^{2} (71.4/sq mi)
- Time zone: UTC+01:00 (CET)
  - Summer (DST): UTC+02:00 (CEST)
- INSEE/Postal code: 24412 /24590
- ^{1} French Land Register data, which excludes lakes, ponds, glaciers > 1 km^{2} (0.386 sq mi or 247 acres) and river estuaries.

Saint-Geniès (French pronunciation: [sɛ̃ ʒənjɛs]; Occitan: Sent Giniés) is a commune in the Dordogne department in Nouvelle-Aquitaine in southwestern France.

== Population ==
Historical population
Year	Pop.	±% p.a.
1968	765	—
1975	731	−0.65%
1982	702	−0.58%
1990	735	+0.58%
1999	815	+1.15%
2007	955	+2.00%
2012	986	+0.64%
2017	939	−0.97%
2023	926	−0.23%
Source: INSEE

== See also ==
- Communes of the Dordogne department
