= Canton of Terrasson-Lavilledieu =

Coordinates: 45.13°N 1.30°E

The canton of Terrasson-Lavilledieu is an administrative division of the Dordogne department, southwestern France. Its borders were modified at the French canton reorganisation which came into effect in March 2015. Its seat is in Terrasson-Lavilledieu.

It consists of the following communes:

1. Archignac
2. Borrèze
3. Calviac-en-Périgord
4. Carlux
5. Carsac-Aillac
6. La Cassagne
7. Condat-sur-Vézère
8. Les Coteaux Périgourdins
9. La Dornac
10. La Feuillade
11. Jayac
12. Nadaillac
13. Paulin
14. Pazayac
15. Pechs-de-l'Espérance
16. Prats-de-Carlux
17. Saint-Crépin-et-Carlucet
18. Sainte-Mondane
19. Saint-Geniès
20. Saint-Julien-de-Lampon
21. Salignac-Eyvigues
22. Simeyrols
23. Terrasson-Lavilledieu
24. Veyrignac
