= Canton of Thenon =

Coordinates: 45°09′N 1°02′E

Thenon
- Former canton
- Interactive map of Thenon
- Country: France
- Region: Nouvelle-Aquitaine
- Department: Dordogne
- No. of communes: {{{nbcomm}}}
- Disbanded: 2015
- Area: 193.84 km^{2} (74.84 sq mi)
- Population (2012): 4,420
  - Density: 22.8/km^{2} (59.1/sq mi)

The Canton of Thenon is a canton of the Dordogne département, in France. It was disbanded following the French canton reorganisation which came into effect in March 2015. It had 4,420 inhabitants (2012). The lowest point is 112 m in the commune of La Boissière-d'Ans, the highest point is in Azerat at 317 m, the average elevation is 209 m. The most populated commune was Thenon with 1,280 inhabitants (2012).

== Communes ==
The canton comprised the following communes:

- Ajat
- Azerat
- Bars
- La Boissière-d'Ans
- Brouchaud
- Fossemagne
- Gabillou
- Limeyrat
- Montagnac-d'Auberoche
- Sainte-Orse
- Thenon

== Population history ==
Year	Population
1962	3,945
1968	4,225
1975	4,193
1982	4,115
1990	4,226
1999	4,021

== See also ==
- Cantons of the Dordogne department
