= Beauregard-de-Terrasson =

- Commune
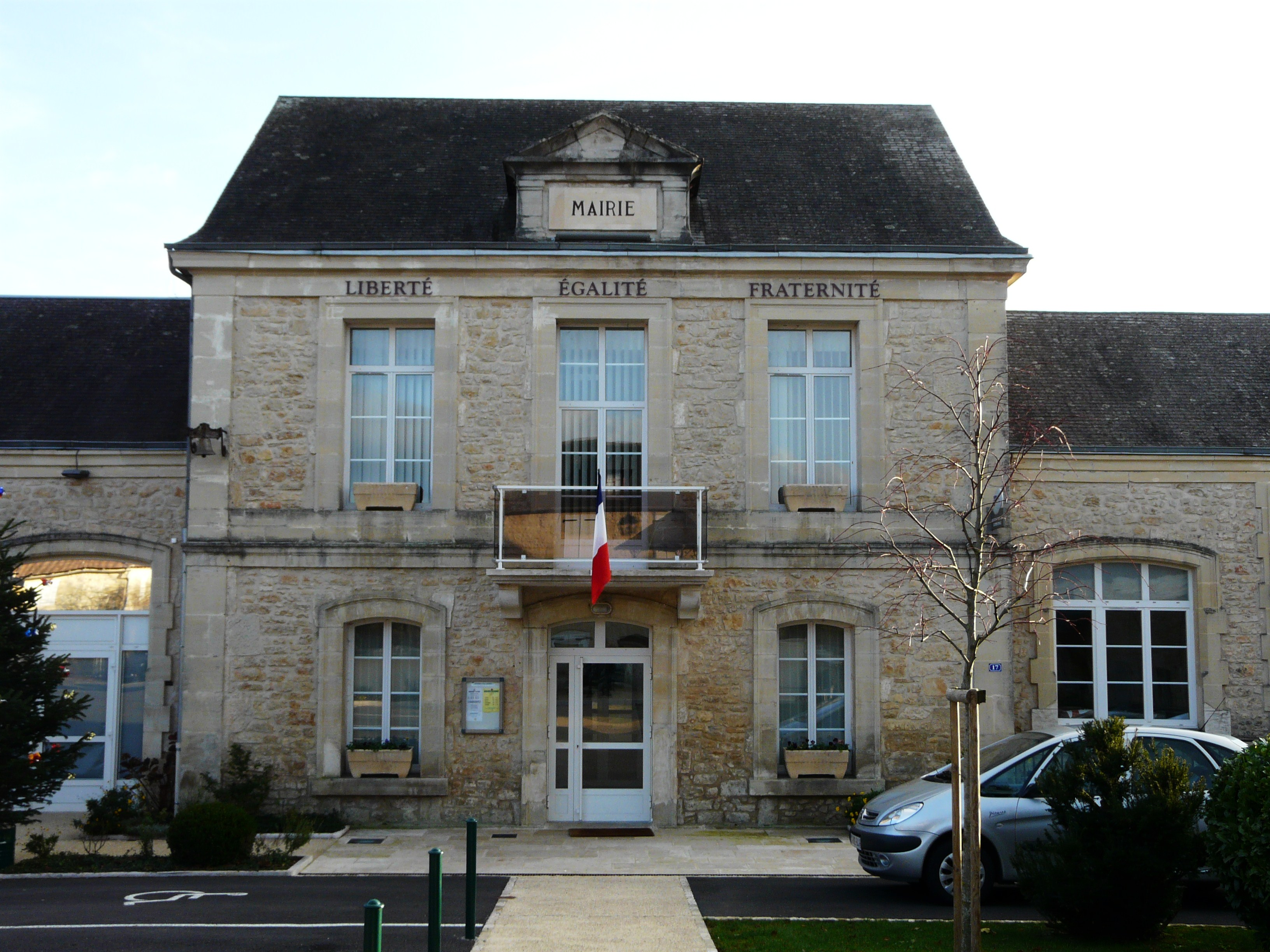
- The town hall in Beauregard-de-Terrasson

- Coat of arms
- Location of Beauregard-de-Terrasson
- Location within France Location within Nouvelle-Aquitaine
- Coordinates: 45°08′57″N 1°13′49″E
- Country: France
- Region: Nouvelle-Aquitaine
- Department: Dordogne
- Arrondissement: Sarlat-la-Canéda
- Canton: Haut-Périgord Noir

Government
  - Mayor (2020–2026): Lionel Armaghanian
- Area^{1}: 7.97 km^{2} (3.08 sq mi)
- Elevation: 248 m (814 ft)
- Highest elevation: 291 m (955 ft)
- Lowest elevation: 112 m (367 ft)
- Population (2023): 731
  - Density: 91.7/km^{2} (238/sq mi)
- Time zone: UTC+01:00 (CET)
  - Summer (DST): UTC+02:00 (CEST)
- INSEE/Postal code: 24030 /24120
- ^{1} French Land Register data, which excludes lakes, ponds, glaciers > 1 km^{2} (0.386 sq mi or 247 acres) and river estuaries.

Beauregard-de-Terrasson (French pronunciation: [boʁɡaʁ də tɛʁasɔ̃], literally Beauregard of Terrasson; Occitan: Beuregard de Terrasson) is a commune in the Dordogne department in southwestern France.

== Population ==
Historical population
Year	Pop.	±% p.a.
1968	436	—
1975	533	+2.91%
1982	575	+1.09%
1990	653	+1.60%
1999	654	+0.02%
2007	690	+0.67%
2012	713	+0.66%
2017	703	−0.28%
2023	731	+0.65%
Source: INSEE

== See also ==
- Communes of the Dordogne department
