= Sainte-Eulalie-d'Ans =

- Commune
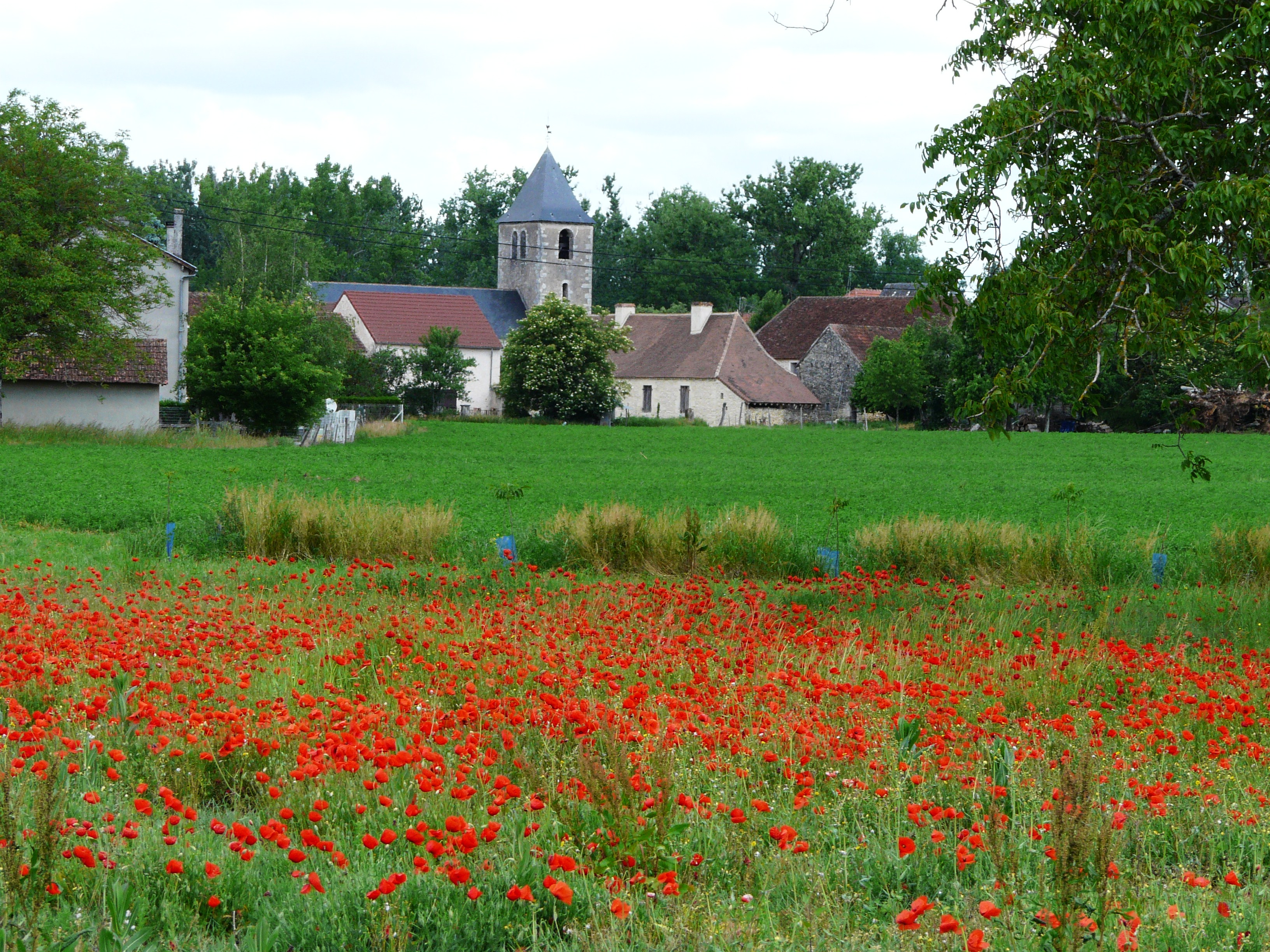
- A general view of Sainte-Eulalie-d'Ans
- Location of Sainte-Eulalie-d'Ans
- Location within France Location within Nouvelle-Aquitaine
- Coordinates: 45°14′52″N 1°01′09″E
- Country: France
- Region: Nouvelle-Aquitaine
- Department: Dordogne
- Arrondissement: Sarlat-la-Canéda
- Canton: Haut-Périgord Noir

Government
  - Mayor (2020–2026): Bernard Durand
- Area^{1}: 11.83 km^{2} (4.57 sq mi)
- Elevation: 130 m (430 ft)
- Highest elevation: 262 m (860 ft)
- Lowest elevation: 122 m (400 ft)
- Population (2023): 298
  - Density: 25.2/km^{2} (65.2/sq mi)
- Time zone: UTC+01:00 (CET)
  - Summer (DST): UTC+02:00 (CEST)
- INSEE/Postal code: 24401 /24640
- ^{1} French Land Register data, which excludes lakes, ponds, glaciers > 1 km^{2} (0.386 sq mi or 247 acres) and river estuaries.

Sainte-Eulalie-d'Ans (French pronunciation: [sɛ̃t ølali dɑ̃s]; Occitan: Senta Eulàlia d'Ans) is a commune in the Dordogne department in Nouvelle-Aquitaine in southwestern France.

It is located on the river Auvézère, about 30 km east of Périgueux and 50 km north of Sarlat-la-Canéda.

It is one of several French communities named after Saint Eulalia.

== Population ==
Historical population
Year	Pop.	±% p.a.
1968	376	—
1975	362	−0.54%
1982	311	−2.15%
1990	304	−0.28%
1999	269	−1.35%
2007	300	+1.37%
2012	287	−0.88%
2017	288	+0.07%
2023	298	+0.57%
Source: INSEE

== See also ==
- Communes of the Dordogne department
