= Boisseuilh =

- Commune
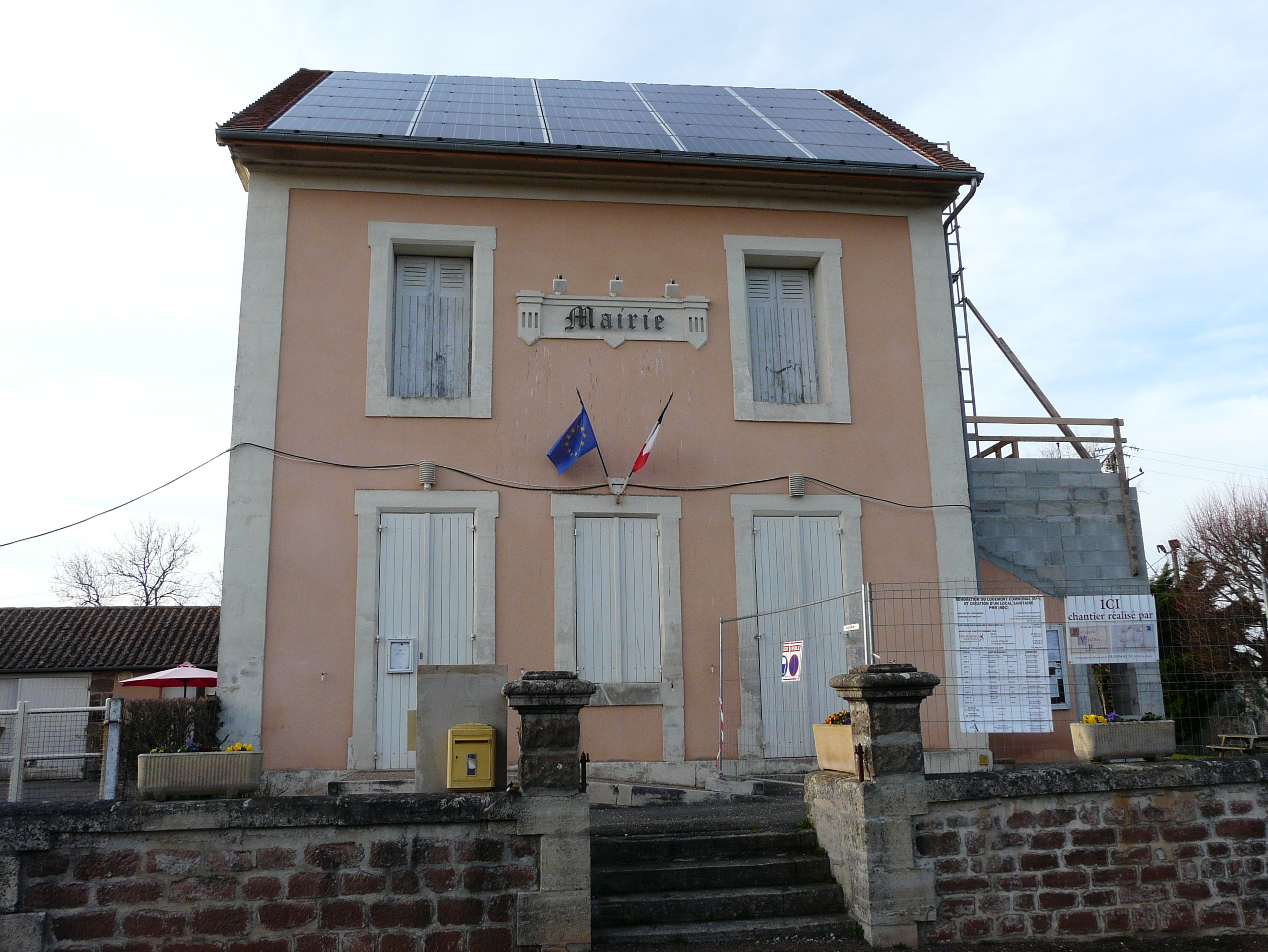
- The town hall in Boisseuilh
- Location of Boisseuilh
- Location within France Location within Nouvelle-Aquitaine
- Coordinates: 45°17′21″N 1°10′44″E
- Country: France
- Region: Nouvelle-Aquitaine
- Department: Dordogne
- Arrondissement: Sarlat-la-Canéda
- Canton: Haut-Périgord Noir

Government
  - Mayor (2020–2026): Gérard Mercier
- Area^{1}: 11.90 km^{2} (4.59 sq mi)
- Elevation: 270 m (890 ft)
- Highest elevation: 266 m (873 ft)
- Lowest elevation: 153 m (502 ft)
- Population (2023): 110
  - Density: 9.2/km^{2} (24/sq mi)
- Time zone: UTC+01:00 (CET)
  - Summer (DST): UTC+02:00 (CEST)
- INSEE/Postal code: 24046 /24390
- ^{1} French Land Register data, which excludes lakes, ponds, glaciers > 1 km^{2} (0.386 sq mi or 247 acres) and river estuaries.

Boisseuilh (French pronunciation: [bwasœj]; Occitan: Boissuelh) is a commune in the Dordogne department in southwestern France.

== Population ==
Historical population
Year	Pop.	±% p.a.
1968	184	—
1975	178	−0.47%
1982	169	−0.74%
1990	113	−4.91%
1999	114	+0.10%
2007	127	+1.36%
2012	116	−1.80%
2017	120	+0.68%
2023	110	−1.44%
Source: INSEE

== See also ==
- Communes of the Dordogne département
