= Villac =

- Commune
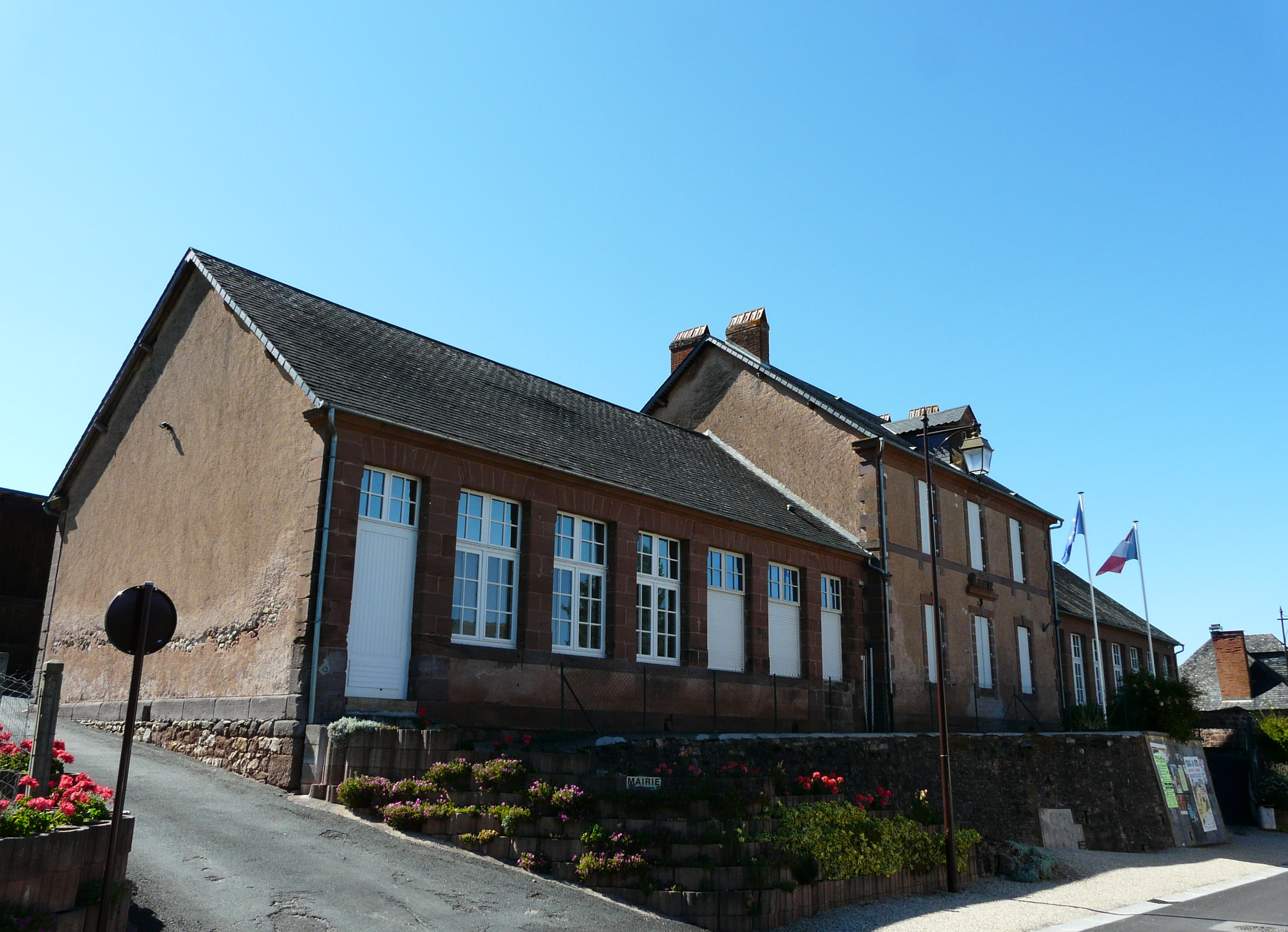
- The town hall in Villac

- Coat of arms
- Location of Villac
- Location within France Location within Nouvelle-Aquitaine
- Coordinates: 45°11′16″N 1°15′19″E
- Country: France
- Region: Nouvelle-Aquitaine
- Department: Dordogne
- Arrondissement: Sarlat-la-Canéda
- Canton: Haut-Périgord Noir

Government
  - Mayor (2020–2026): Laurent Pellerin
- Area^{1}: 20.61 km^{2} (7.96 sq mi)
- Elevation: 146 m (479 ft)
- Highest elevation: 330 m (1,080 ft)
- Lowest elevation: 126 m (413 ft)
- Population (2023): 295
  - Density: 14.3/km^{2} (37.1/sq mi)
- Time zone: UTC+01:00 (CET)
  - Summer (DST): UTC+02:00 (CEST)
- INSEE/Postal code: 24580 /24120
- ^{1} French Land Register data, which excludes lakes, ponds, glaciers > 1 km^{2} (0.386 sq mi or 247 acres) and river estuaries.

Villac is a commune in the Dordogne department in Nouvelle-Aquitaine in southwestern France.

== Population ==
Historical population
Year	Pop.	±% p.a.
1968	371	—
1975	275	−4.19%
1982	276	+0.05%
1990	252	−1.13%
1999	225	−1.25%
2007	232	+0.38%
2012	255	+1.91%
2017	266	+0.85%
2023	295	+1.74%
Source: INSEE

== See also ==
- Communes of the Dordogne department
