= Arrondissement of Sarlat-la-Canéda =

Coordinates: 44.88°N 1.22°E

Sarlat-la-Canéda
- Arrondissement
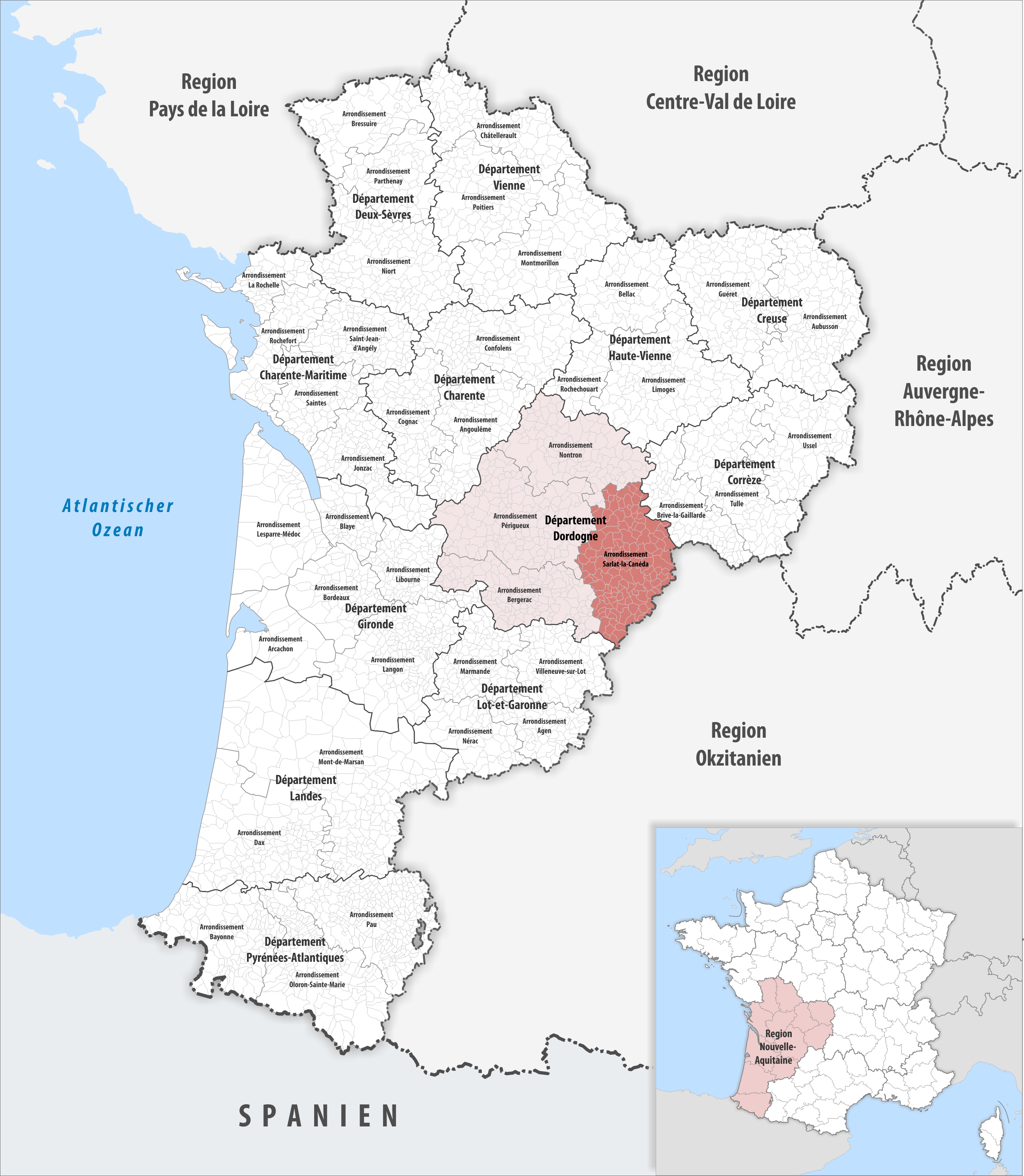
- Location within the region Nouvelle-Aquitaine
- Country: France
- Region: Nouvelle-Aquitaine
- Department: Dordogne
- No. of communes: {{{nbcomm}}}
- Area: 2,273.1 km^{2} (877.6 sq mi)
- Population (2023): 81,931
  - Density: 36.044/km^{2} (93.353/sq mi)
- INSEE code: 244

The arrondissement of Sarlat-la-Canéda is an arrondissement in France in the Dordogne department in the Nouvelle-Aquitaine region. It has 136 communes. Its population is 81,203 (2021), and its area is 2,273.1 km^{2} (877.6 sq mi).

== Composition ==
The communes of the arrondissement of Sarlat-la-Canéda, and their INSEE codes, are:

1. Ajat (24004)
2. Allas-les-Mines (24006)
3. Archignac (24012)
4. Aubas (24014)
5. Audrix (24015)
6. Auriac-du-Périgord (24018)
7. Azerat (24019)
8. La Bachellerie (24020)
9. Badefols-d'Ans (24021)
10. Bars (24025)
11. Beauregard-de-Terrasson (24030)
12. Berbiguières (24036)
13. Besse (24039)
14. Beynac-et-Cazenac (24040)
15. Boisseuilh (24046)
16. Borrèze (24050)
17. Bouzic (24063)
18. Le Bugue (24067)
19. Calviac-en-Périgord (24074)
20. Campagnac-lès-Quercy (24075)
21. Campagne (24076)
22. Carlux (24081)
23. Carsac-Aillac (24082)
24. Carves (24084)
25. La Cassagne (24085)
26. Castelnaud-la-Chapelle (24086)
27. Castels et Bézenac (24087)
28. Cénac-et-Saint-Julien (24091)
29. La Chapelle-Aubareil (24106)
30. La Chapelle-Saint-Jean (24113)
31. Châtres (24116)
32. Chourgnac (24121)
33. Cladech (24122)
34. Coly-Saint-Amand (24364)
35. Condat-sur-Vézère (24130)
36. Les Coteaux Périgourdins (24117)
37. Coubjours (24136)
38. Coux-et-Bigaroque-Mouzens (24142)
39. Daglan (24150)
40. Doissat (24151)
41. Domme (24152)
42. La Dornac (24153)
43. Les Eyzies (24172)
44. Fanlac (24174)
45. Les Farges (24175)
46. La Feuillade (24179)
47. Fleurac (24183)
48. Florimont-Gaumier (24184)
49. Fossemagne (24188)
50. Gabillou (24192)
51. Granges-d'Ans (24202)
52. Grives (24206)
53. Groléjac (24207)
54. Hautefort (24210)
55. Jayac (24215)
56. Journiac (24217)
57. Le Lardin-Saint-Lazare (24229)
58. Larzac (24230)
59. Lavaur (24232)
60. Limeuil (24240)
61. Limeyrat (24241)
62. Loubejac (24245)
63. Marcillac-Saint-Quentin (24252)
64. Marnac (24254)
65. Marquay (24255)
66. Mauzens-et-Miremont (24261)
67. Mazeyrolles (24263)
68. Meyrals (24268)
69. Monplaisant (24293)
70. Montagnac-d'Auberoche (24284)
71. Montignac-Lascaux (24291)
72. Nabirat (24300)
73. Nadaillac (24301)
74. Nailhac (24302)
75. Orliac (24313)
76. Paulin (24317)
77. Pays-de-Belvès (24035)
78. Pazayac (24321)
79. Pechs-de-l'Espérance (24325)
80. Peyrignac (24324)
81. Peyzac-le-Moustier (24326)
82. Plazac (24330)
83. Prats-de-Carlux (24336)
84. Prats-du-Périgord (24337)
85. Proissans (24341)
86. La Roque-Gageac (24355)
87. Rouffignac-Saint-Cernin-de-Reilhac (24356)
88. Sagelat (24360)
89. Saint-André-d'Allas (24366)
90. Saint-Aubin-de-Nabirat (24375)
91. Saint-Avit-de-Vialard (24377)
92. Saint-Cernin-de-l'Herm (24386)
93. Saint-Chamassy (24388)
94. Saint-Crépin-et-Carlucet (24392)
95. Saint-Cybranet (24395)
96. Saint-Cyprien (24396)
97. Sainte-Eulalie-d'Ans (24401)
98. Sainte-Foy-de-Belvès (24406)
99. Sainte-Mondane (24470)
100. Sainte-Nathalène (24471)
101. Sainte-Orse (24473)
102. Sainte-Trie (24507)
103. Saint-Félix-de-Reillac-et-Mortemart (24404)
104. Saint-Geniès (24412)
105. Saint-Germain-de-Belvès (24416)
106. Saint-Julien-de-Lampon (24432)
107. Saint-Laurent-la-Vallée (24438)
108. Saint-Léon-sur-Vézère (24443)
109. Saint-Martial-de-Nabirat (24450)
110. Saint-Pardoux-et-Vielvic (24478)
111. Saint-Pompont (24488)
112. Saint-Rabier (24491)
113. Saint-Vincent-de-Cosse (24510)
114. Saint-Vincent-le-Paluel (24512)
115. Salignac-Eyvigues (24516)
116. Salles-de-Belvès (24517)
117. Sarlat-la-Canéda (24520)
118. Savignac-de-Miremont (24524)
119. Sergeac (24531)
120. Simeyrols (24535)
121. Siorac-en-Périgord (24538)
122. Tamniès (24544)
123. Teillots (24545)
124. Temple-Laguyon (24546)
125. Terrasson-Lavilledieu (24547)
126. Thenon (24550)
127. Thonac (24552)
128. Tourtoirac (24555)
129. Tursac (24559)
130. Valojoulx (24563)
131. Veyrignac (24574)
132. Veyrines-de-Domme (24575)
133. Vézac (24577)
134. Villac (24580)
135. Villefranche-du-Périgord (24585)
136. Vitrac (24587)

== History ==
The arrondissement of Sarlat-la-Canéda was created in 1800. At the January 2017 reorganisation of the arrondissements of Dordogne, it gained 22 communes from the arrondissement of Périgueux and one commune from the arrondissement of Bergerac.

As a result of the reorganisation of the cantons of France which came into effect in 2015, the borders of the cantons are no longer related to the borders of the arrondissements. The cantons of the arrondissement of Sarlat-la-Canéda were, as of January 2015:

1. Belvès
2. Le Bugue
3. Carlux
4. Domme
5. Montignac
6. Saint-Cyprien
7. Salignac-Eyvigues
8. Sarlat-la-Canéda
9. Terrasson-Lavilledieu
10. Villefranche-du-Périgord
