= Châtres, Dordogne =

Châtres
- Commune
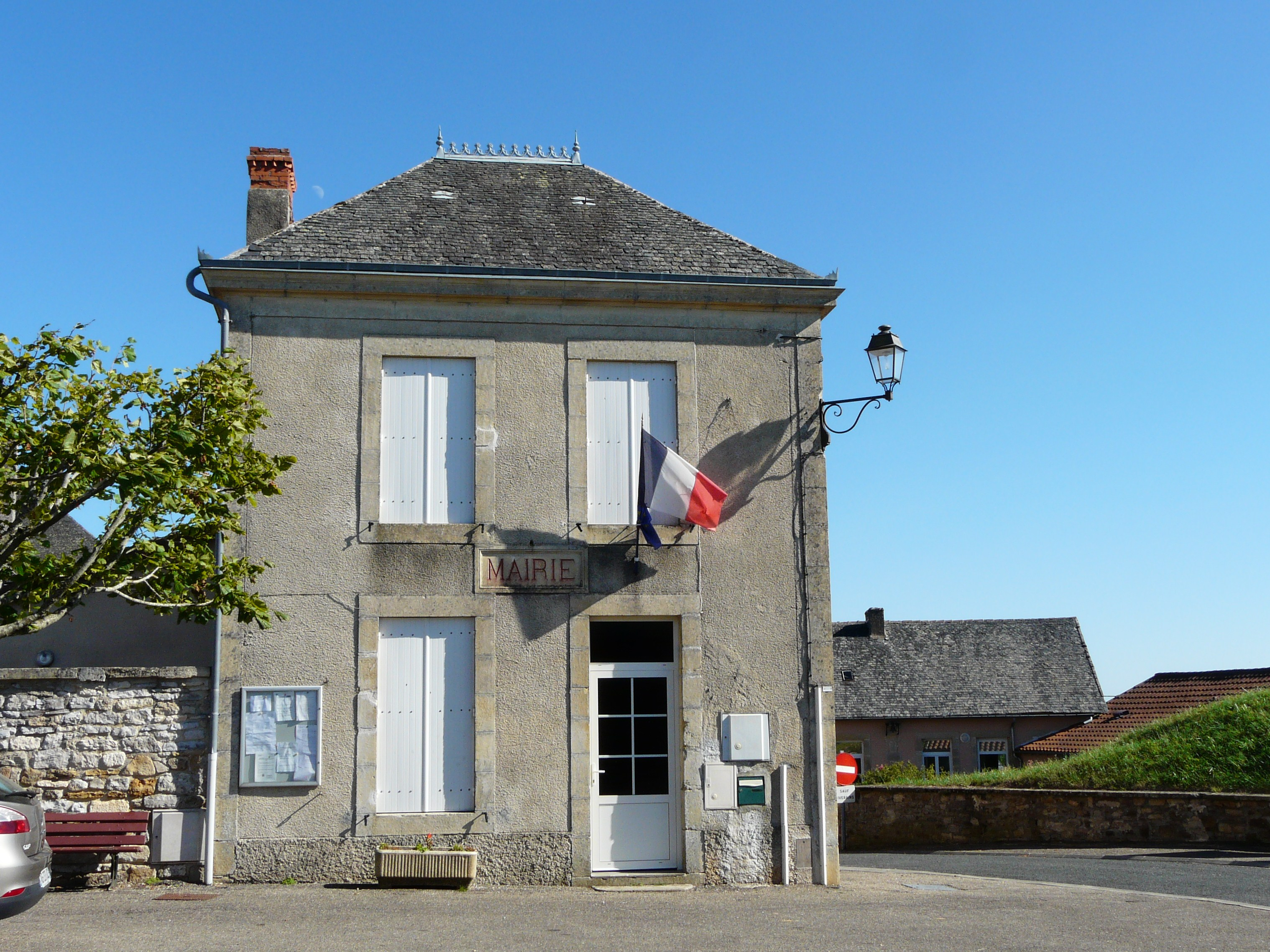
- The town hall in Châtres
- Location of Châtres
- Location within France Location within Nouvelle-Aquitaine
- Coordinates: 45°11′11″N 1°11′54″E
- Country: France
- Region: Nouvelle-Aquitaine
- Department: Dordogne
- Arrondissement: Sarlat-la-Canéda
- Canton: Haut-Périgord Noir

Government
  - Mayor (2020–2026): Bernadette Merlin
- Area^{1}: 12.20 km^{2} (4.71 sq mi)
- Elevation: 320 m (1,050 ft)
- Highest elevation: 334 m (1,096 ft)
- Lowest elevation: 157 m (515 ft)
- Population (2023): 180
  - Density: 15/km^{2} (38/sq mi)
- Time zone: UTC+01:00 (CET)
  - Summer (DST): UTC+02:00 (CEST)
- INSEE/Postal code: 24116 /24120
- ^{1} French Land Register data, which excludes lakes, ponds, glaciers > 1 km^{2} (0.386 sq mi or 247 acres) and river estuaries.

Châtres (French pronunciation: [ʃatʁ]; Occitan: En Chastre) is a commune in the Dordogne department in Nouvelle-Aquitaine in southwestern France.

== Population ==
Historical population
Year	Pop.	±% p.a.
1968	226	—
1975	187	−2.67%
1982	173	−1.11%
1990	181	+0.57%
1999	161	−1.29%
2007	166	+0.38%
2012	190	+2.74%
2017	194	+0.42%
2023	180	−1.24%
Source: INSEE

== See also ==
- Communes of the Dordogne department
