= La Chapelle-Saint-Jean =

- Commune
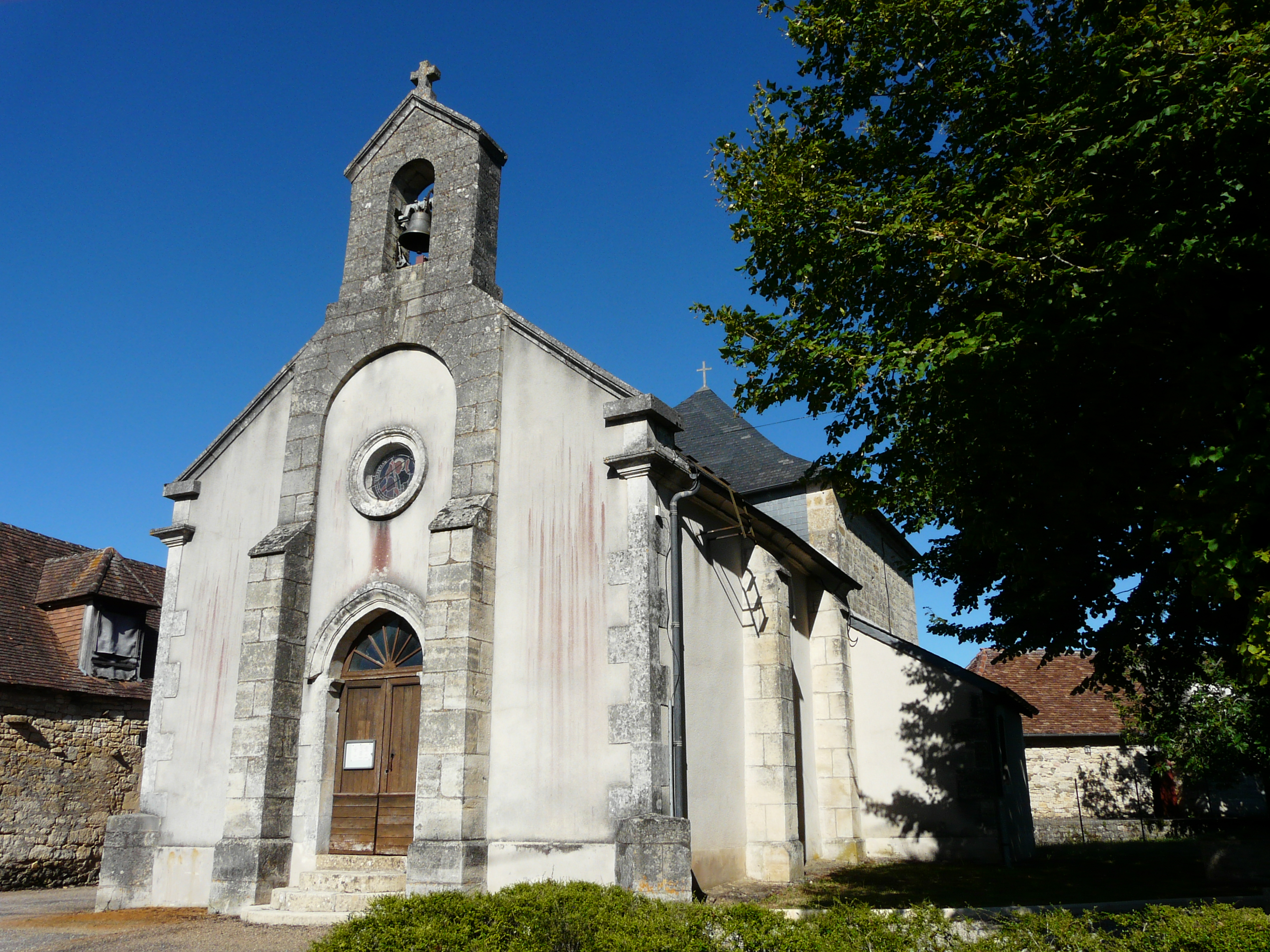
- The church in La Chapelle-Saint-Jean
- Location of La Chapelle-Saint-Jean
- Location within France Location within Nouvelle-Aquitaine
- Coordinates: 45°11′44″N 1°09′48″E
- Country: France
- Region: Nouvelle-Aquitaine
- Department: Dordogne
- Arrondissement: Sarlat-la-Canéda
- Canton: Haut-Périgord Noir

Government
  - Mayor (2020–2026): Daniel Boutot
- Area^{1}: 3.70 km^{2} (1.43 sq mi)
- Elevation: 320 m (1,050 ft)
- Highest elevation: 356 m (1,168 ft)
- Lowest elevation: 204 m (669 ft)
- Population (2023): 82
  - Density: 22/km^{2} (57/sq mi)
- Time zone: UTC+01:00 (CET)
  - Summer (DST): UTC+02:00 (CEST)
- INSEE/Postal code: 24113 /24390
- ^{1} French Land Register data, which excludes lakes, ponds, glaciers > 1 km^{2} (0.386 sq mi or 247 acres) and river estuaries.

La Chapelle-Saint-Jean (French pronunciation: [la ʃapɛl sɛ̃ ʒɑ̃]; Limousin: La Chapela Sent Joan) is a commune in the Dordogne department in Nouvelle-Aquitaine in southwestern France.

== Population ==
Historical population
Year	Pop.	±% p.a.
1968	67	—
1975	62	−1.10%
1982	74	+2.56%
1990	69	−0.87%
1999	62	−1.18%
2007	76	+2.58%
2012	94	+4.34%
2017	91	−0.65%
2023	82	−1.72%
Source: INSEE

== See also ==
- Communes of the Dordogne department
