= Temple-Laguyon =

- Commune
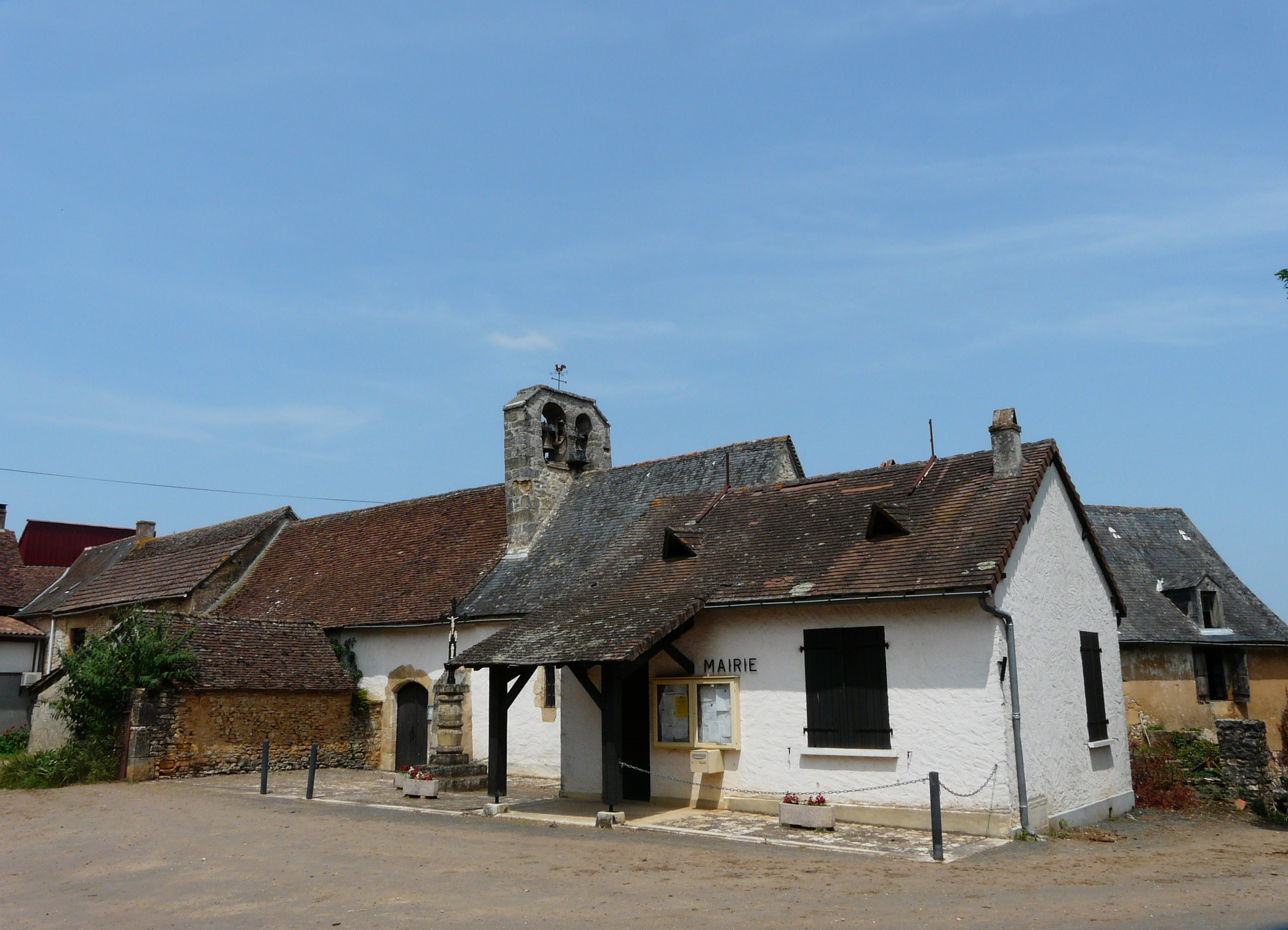
- The church and town hall in Temple-Laguyon
- Location of Temple-Laguyon
- Location within France Location within Nouvelle-Aquitaine
- Coordinates: 45°14′05″N 1°06′02″E
- Country: France
- Region: Nouvelle-Aquitaine
- Department: Dordogne
- Arrondissement: Sarlat-la-Canéda
- Canton: Haut-Périgord Noir

Government
  - Mayor (2020–2026): Jean-Michel Lagorce
- Area^{1}: 2.94 km^{2} (1.14 sq mi)
- Elevation: 226 m (741 ft)
- Highest elevation: 275 m (902 ft)
- Lowest elevation: 180 m (590 ft)
- Population (2023): 34
  - Density: 12/km^{2} (30/sq mi)
- Time zone: UTC+01:00 (CET)
  - Summer (DST): UTC+02:00 (CEST)
- INSEE/Postal code: 24546 /24390
- ^{1} French Land Register data, which excludes lakes, ponds, glaciers > 1 km^{2} (0.386 sq mi or 247 acres) and river estuaries.

Temple-Laguyon (French pronunciation: [tɑ̃pl laɡɥijɔ̃]; Occitan: Lo Temple de Laguion) is a commune in the Dordogne department in Nouvelle-Aquitaine in southwestern France.

== Population ==
Historical population
Year	Pop.	±% p.a.
1968	58	—
1975	54	−1.02%
1982	52	−0.54%
1990	47	−1.26%
1999	43	−0.98%
2007	39	−1.21%
2012	47	+3.80%
2017	41	−2.69%
2023	34	−3.07%
Source: INSEE

== See also ==
- Communes of the Dordogne department
