= Saint-Rabier =

- Commune
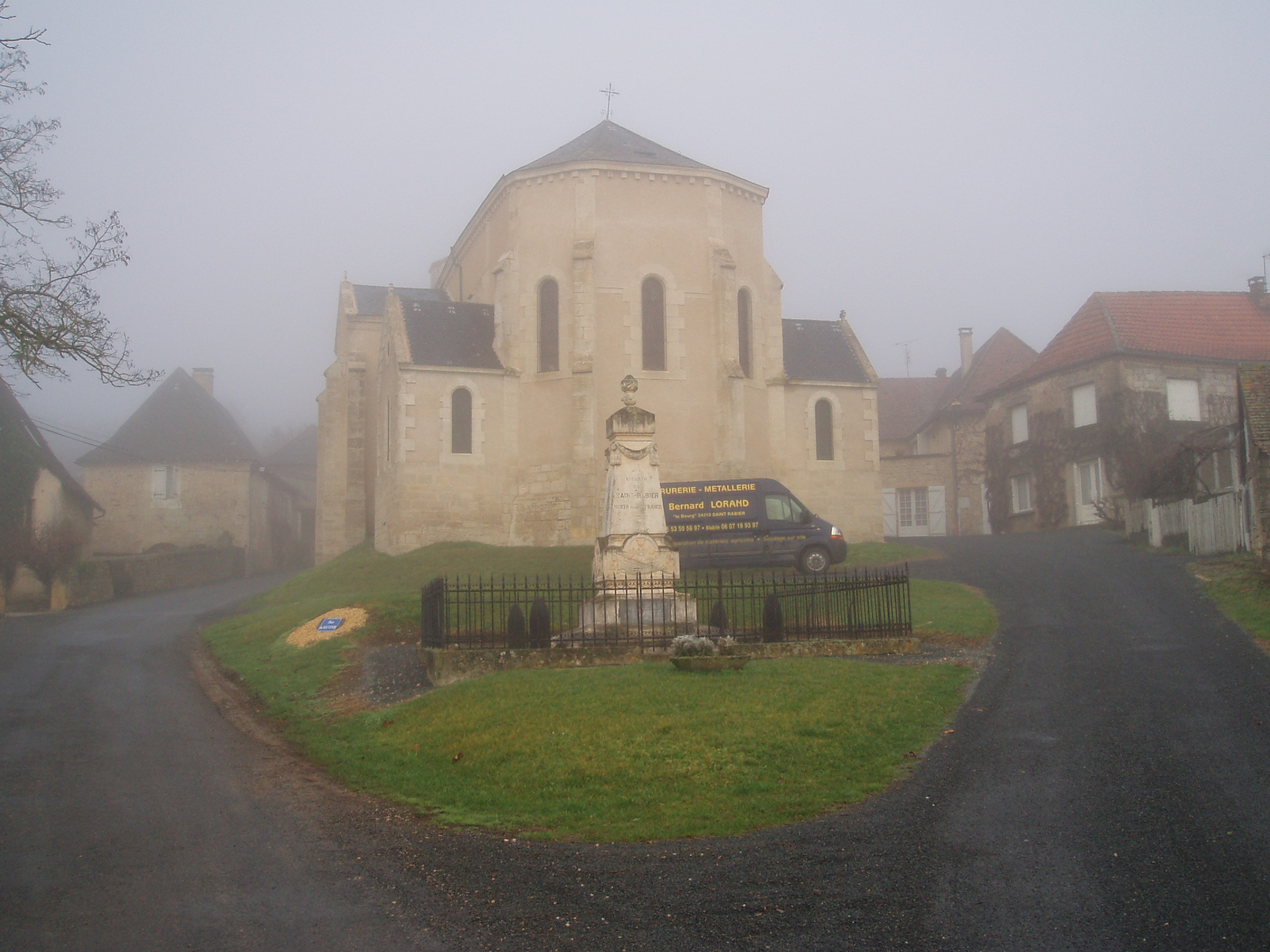
- The church in Saint-Rabier

- Coat of arms
- Location of Saint-Rabier
- Location within France Location within Nouvelle-Aquitaine
- Coordinates: 45°10′16″N 1°09′08″E
- Country: France
- Region: Nouvelle-Aquitaine
- Department: Dordogne
- Arrondissement: Sarlat-la-Canéda
- Canton: Haut-Périgord Noir

Government
  - Mayor (2020–2026): Claude Delpy
- Area^{1}: 15.87 km^{2} (6.13 sq mi)
- Elevation: 212 m (696 ft)
- Highest elevation: 341 m (1,119 ft)
- Lowest elevation: 117 m (384 ft)
- Population (2023): 538
  - Density: 33.9/km^{2} (87.8/sq mi)
- Time zone: UTC+01:00 (CET)
  - Summer (DST): UTC+02:00 (CEST)
- INSEE/Postal code: 24491 /24210
- ^{1} French Land Register data, which excludes lakes, ponds, glaciers > 1 km^{2} (0.386 sq mi or 247 acres) and river estuaries.

Saint-Rabier (pronounced [sɛ̃.ʁa.bje]; Occitan: Sent Rabier) is a commune in the Dordogne department in Nouvelle-Aquitaine in southwestern France.

It was recorded as Sanctus Riberius in Medieval Latin.

== Population ==
Historical population
Year	Pop.	±% p.a.
1968	576	—
1975	518	−1.50%
1982	580	+1.63%
1990	573	−0.15%
1999	502	−1.46%
2007	545	+1.03%
2012	585	+1.43%
2017	585	+0.00%
2023	538	−1.39%
Source: INSEE

== See also ==
- Communes of the Dordogne department
