= Tourtoirac =

- Commune
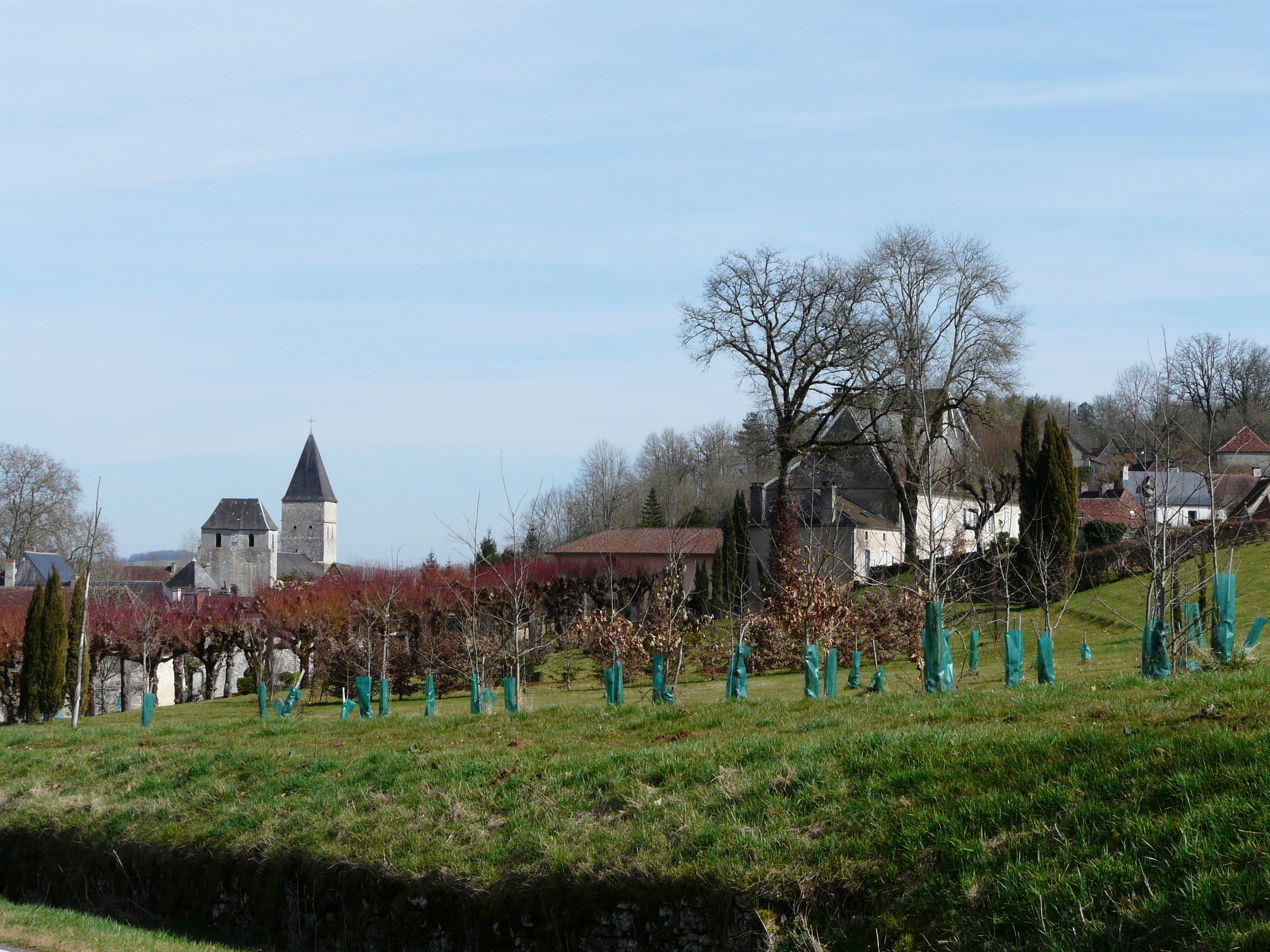
- A general view of Tourtoirac
- Location of Tourtoirac
- Location within France Location within Nouvelle-Aquitaine
- Coordinates: 45°16′17″N 1°03′31″E
- Country: France
- Region: Nouvelle-Aquitaine
- Department: Dordogne
- Arrondissement: Sarlat-la-Canéda
- Canton: Haut-Périgord Noir

Government
  - Mayor (2020–2026): Dominique Durand
- Area^{1}: 25.43 km^{2} (9.82 sq mi)
- Elevation: 110 m (360 ft)
- Highest elevation: 286 m (938 ft)
- Lowest elevation: 125 m (410 ft)
- Population (2023): 636
  - Density: 25.0/km^{2} (64.8/sq mi)
- Time zone: UTC+01:00 (CET)
  - Summer (DST): UTC+02:00 (CEST)
- INSEE/Postal code: 24555 /24390
- ^{1} French Land Register data, which excludes lakes, ponds, glaciers > 1 km^{2} (0.386 sq mi or 247 acres) and river estuaries.

Tourtoirac (French pronunciation: [tuʁtwaʁak]; Occitan: Tortoirac) is a commune in the Dordogne department in Nouvelle-Aquitaine in southwestern France.

== History ==
On May 6, 2024, 82 graves in the local cemetery were defaced with offensive graffiti, including hate speech, references to political figures, and Islamic connotations. The Périgueux prosecutor's office has indicated a potential connection between this act and a series of similar incidents that began in the previous year involving graffiti on calvaries in the same region. Authorities are investigating to determine if the perpetrators were affiliated with Islamists or extreme right activists.

== Population ==
Historical population
Year	Pop.	±% p.a.
1968	849	—
1975	754	−1.68%
1982	756	+0.04%
1990	654	−1.80%
1999	612	−0.73%
2007	633	+0.42%
2012	654	+0.65%
2017	644	−0.31%
2023	636	−0.21%
Source: INSEE

== See also ==
- Communes of the Dordogne department
