= Teillots =

- Commune
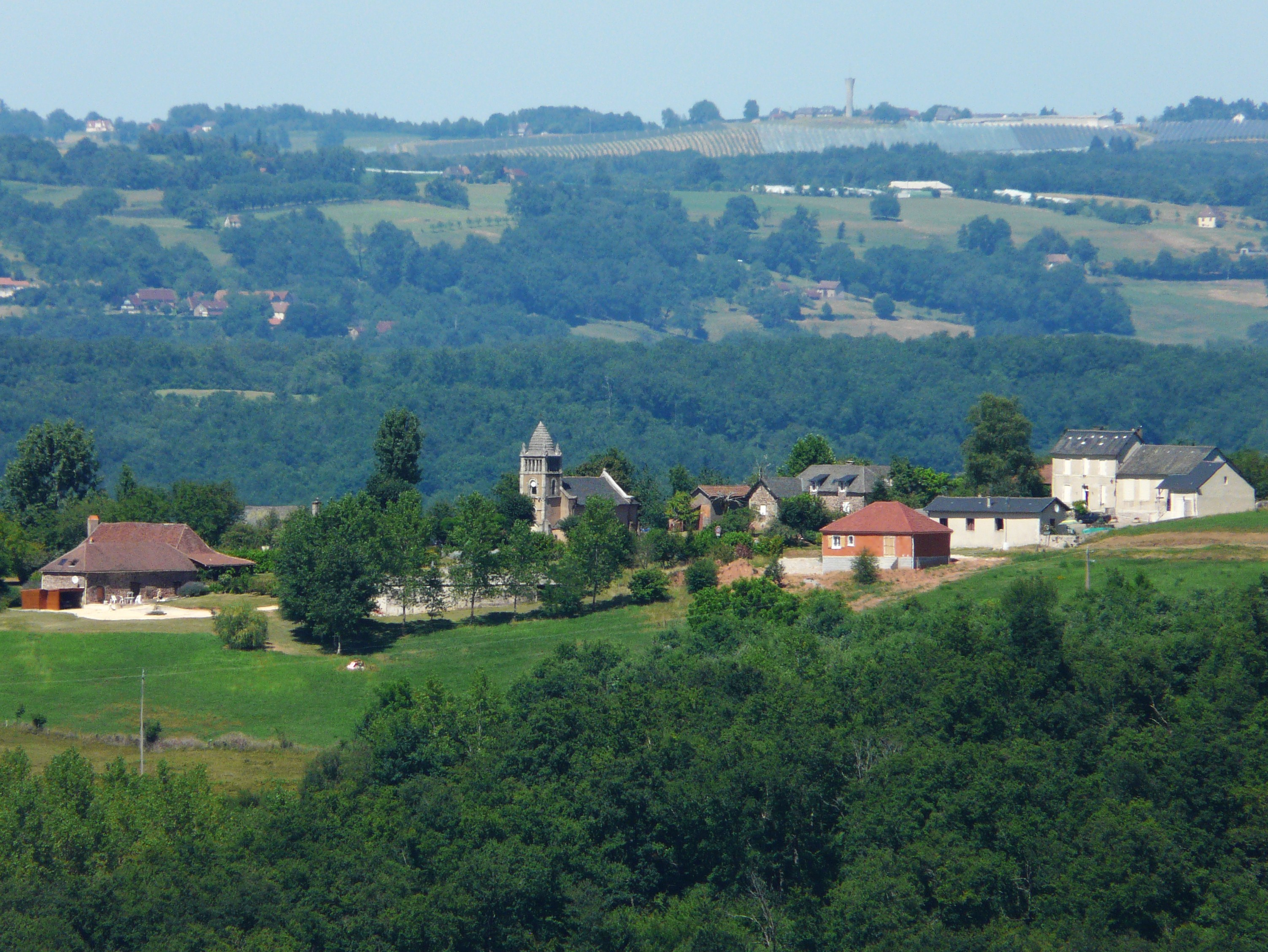
- A general view of Teillots
- Location of Teillots
- Location within France Location within Nouvelle-Aquitaine
- Coordinates: 45°15′30″N 1°13′18″E
- Country: France
- Region: Nouvelle-Aquitaine
- Department: Dordogne
- Arrondissement: Sarlat-la-Canéda
- Canton: Haut-Périgord Noir

Government
  - Mayor (2020–2026): Mattia Trentemont
- Area^{1}: 10.02 km^{2} (3.87 sq mi)
- Elevation: 283 m (928 ft)
- Highest elevation: 302 m (991 ft)
- Lowest elevation: 164 m (538 ft)
- Population (2023): 100
  - Density: 10/km^{2} (26/sq mi)
- Time zone: UTC+01:00 (CET)
  - Summer (DST): UTC+02:00 (CEST)
- INSEE/Postal code: 24545 /24390
- ^{1} French Land Register data, which excludes lakes, ponds, glaciers > 1 km^{2} (0.386 sq mi or 247 acres) and river estuaries.

Teillots is a commune in the Dordogne department in Nouvelle-Aquitaine in southwestern France.

== Population ==
Historical population
Year	Pop.	±% p.a.
1968	152	—
1975	132	−2.00%
1982	131	−0.11%
1990	123	−0.78%
1999	137	+1.20%
2007	129	−0.75%
2012	103	−4.40%
2017	102	−0.19%
2023	100	−0.33%
Source: INSEE

== See also ==
- Communes of the Dordogne department
