= Coubjours =

- Commune
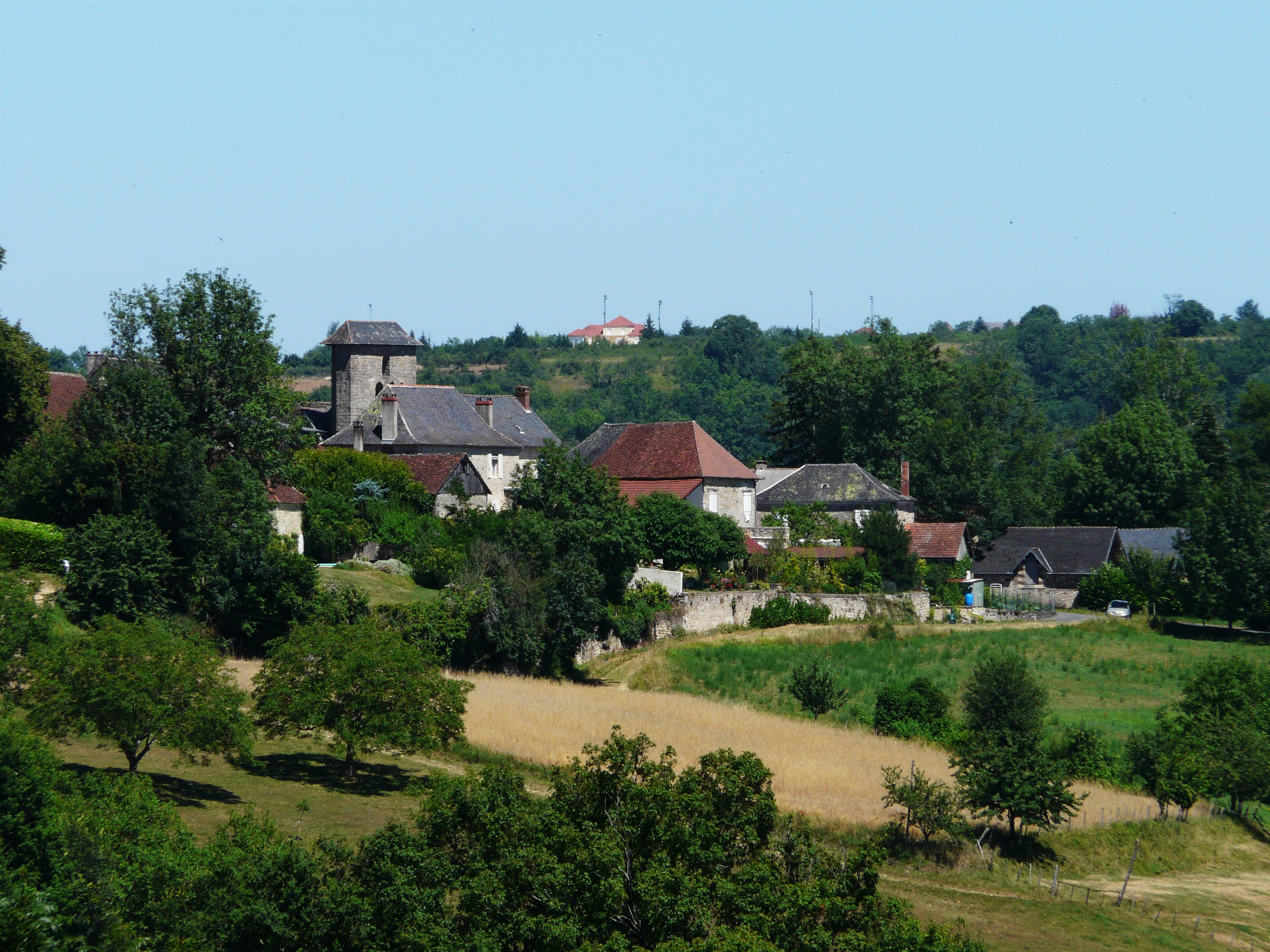
- A general view of Coubjours
- Location of Coubjours
- Location within France Location within Nouvelle-Aquitaine
- Coordinates: 45°14′54″N 1°15′30″E
- Country: France
- Region: Nouvelle-Aquitaine
- Department: Dordogne
- Arrondissement: Sarlat-la-Canéda
- Canton: Haut-Périgord Noir

Government
  - Mayor (2020–2026): Jean-Michel Lagorse
- Area^{1}: 9.55 km^{2} (3.69 sq mi)
- Elevation: 183 m (600 ft)
- Highest elevation: 337 m (1,106 ft)
- Lowest elevation: 171 m (561 ft)
- Population (2023): 109
  - Density: 11.4/km^{2} (29.6/sq mi)
- Time zone: UTC+01:00 (CET)
  - Summer (DST): UTC+02:00 (CEST)
- INSEE/Postal code: 24136 /24390
- ^{1} French Land Register data, which excludes lakes, ponds, glaciers > 1 km^{2} (0.386 sq mi or 247 acres) and river estuaries.

Coubjours (French pronunciation: [kuʒuʁ]; Occitan: Cojors) is a commune in the Dordogne department in Nouvelle-Aquitaine in southwestern France.

== Population ==
Historical population
Year	Pop.	±% p.a.
1968	236	—
1975	205	−1.99%
1982	183	−1.61%
1990	175	−0.56%
1999	153	−1.48%
2007	146	−0.58%
2012	157	+1.46%
2017	128	−4.00%
2023	109	−2.64%
Source: INSEE

== See also ==
- Communes of the Dordogne department
