= Nailhac =

- Commune
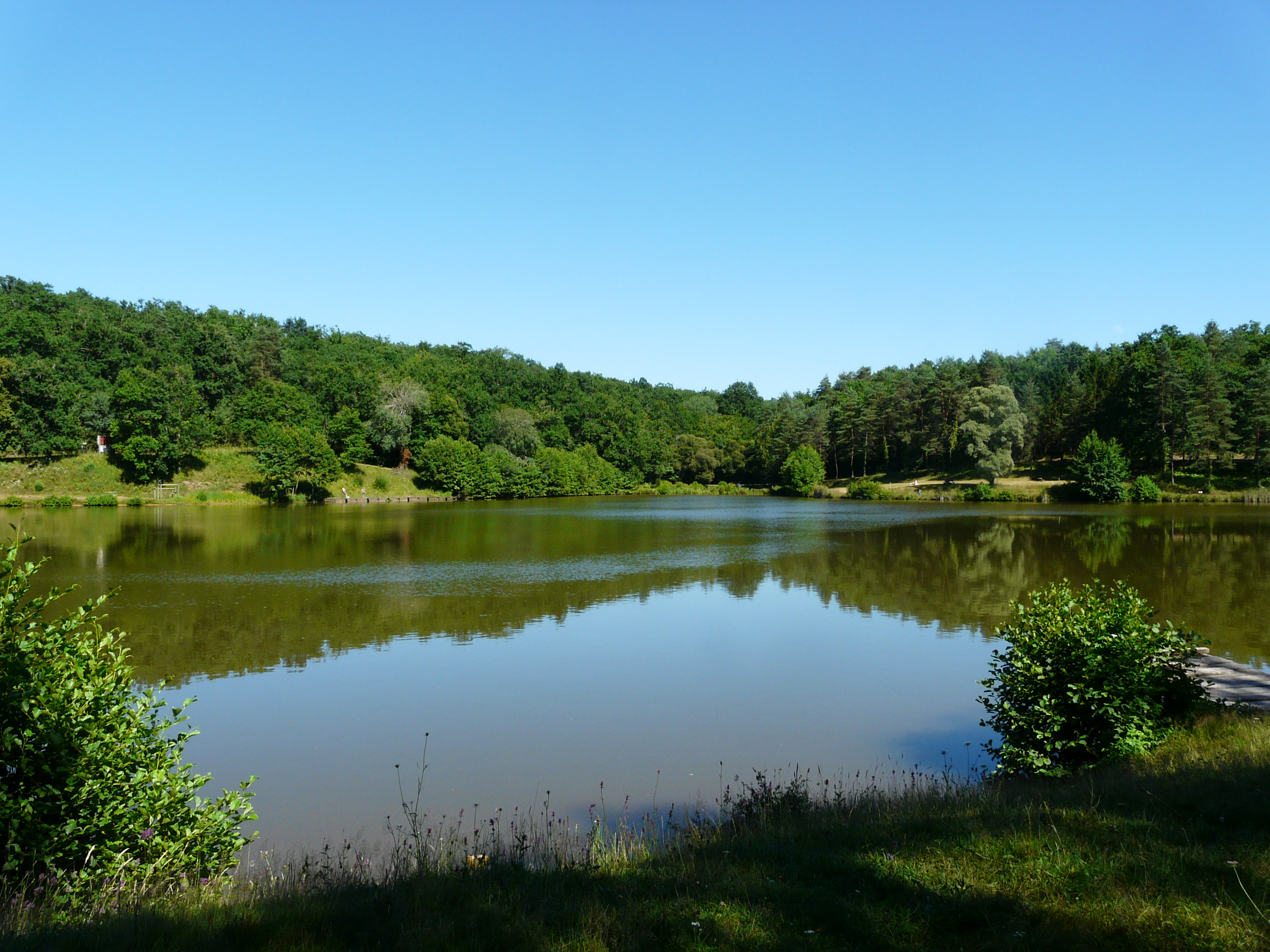
- Nailhac seen across L'Etang du coucou
- Location of Nailhac
- Location within France Location within Nouvelle-Aquitaine
- Coordinates: 45°13′40″N 1°09′12″E
- Country: France
- Region: Nouvelle-Aquitaine
- Department: Dordogne
- Arrondissement: Sarlat-la-Canéda
- Canton: Haut-Périgord Noir
- Intercommunality: Terrassonnais en Périgord Noir Thenon Hautefort

Government
  - Mayor (2020–2026): Francis Aumettre
- Area^{1}: 19.35 km^{2} (7.47 sq mi)
- Elevation: 225 m (738 ft)
- Highest elevation: 357 m (1,171 ft)
- Lowest elevation: 161 m (528 ft)
- Population (2023): 289
  - Density: 14.9/km^{2} (38.7/sq mi)
- Time zone: UTC+01:00 (CET)
  - Summer (DST): UTC+02:00 (CEST)
- INSEE/Postal code: 24302 /24390
- ^{1} French Land Register data, which excludes lakes, ponds, glaciers > 1 km^{2} (0.386 sq mi or 247 acres) and river estuaries.

Nailhac (French pronunciation: [najak]; Occitan: Nalhac) is a commune in the Dordogne department in Nouvelle-Aquitaine in southwestern France.

== Population ==
Historical population
Year	Pop.	±% p.a.
1968	429	—
1975	378	−1.79%
1982	345	−1.30%
1990	299	−1.77%
1999	281	−0.69%
2007	277	−0.18%
2012	298	+1.47%
2017	333	+2.25%
2023	289	−2.33%
Source: INSEE

== See also ==
- Communes of the Dordogne department
