= Peyrignac =

- Commune
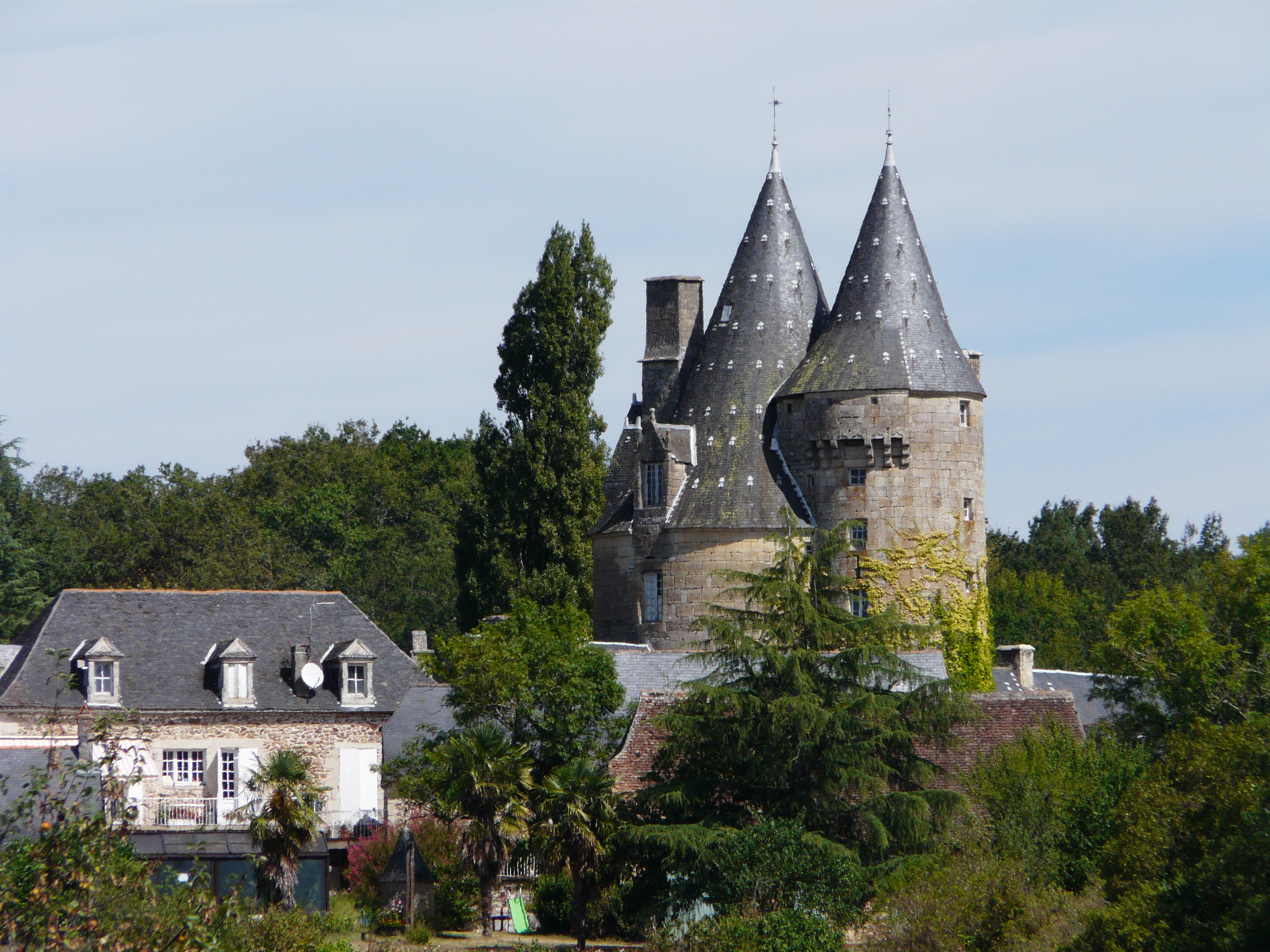
- Chateau of Chapoulie

- Coat of arms
- Location of Peyrignac
- Location within France Location within Nouvelle-Aquitaine
- Coordinates: 45°09′24″N 1°11′32″E
- Country: France
- Region: Nouvelle-Aquitaine
- Department: Dordogne
- Arrondissement: Sarlat-la-Canéda
- Canton: Haut-Périgord Noir
- Intercommunality: Terrassonnais en Périgord Noir Thenon Hautefort

Government
  - Mayor (2020–2026): Marie-Claire Boulinguez
- Area^{1}: 6.30 km^{2} (2.43 sq mi)
- Elevation: 200 m (660 ft)
- Highest elevation: 308 m (1,010 ft)
- Lowest elevation: 107 m (351 ft)
- Population (2023): 577
  - Density: 91.6/km^{2} (237/sq mi)
- Time zone: UTC+01:00 (CET)
  - Summer (DST): UTC+02:00 (CEST)
- INSEE/Postal code: 24324 /24210
- ^{1} French Land Register data, which excludes lakes, ponds, glaciers > 1 km^{2} (0.386 sq mi or 247 acres) and river estuaries.

Peyrignac (French pronunciation: [peʁiɲak]; Occitan: Pairinhac) is a commune in the Dordogne department in Nouvelle-Aquitaine in southwestern France.

== Population ==
Historical population
Year	Pop.	±% p.a.
1968	311	—
1975	357	+1.99%
1982	389	+1.23%
1990	372	−0.56%
1999	394	+0.64%
2007	503	+3.10%
2012	538	+1.35%
2017	580	+1.51%
2023	577	−0.09%
Source: INSEE

== See also ==
- Communes of the Dordogne department
