= Ajat =

- Commune
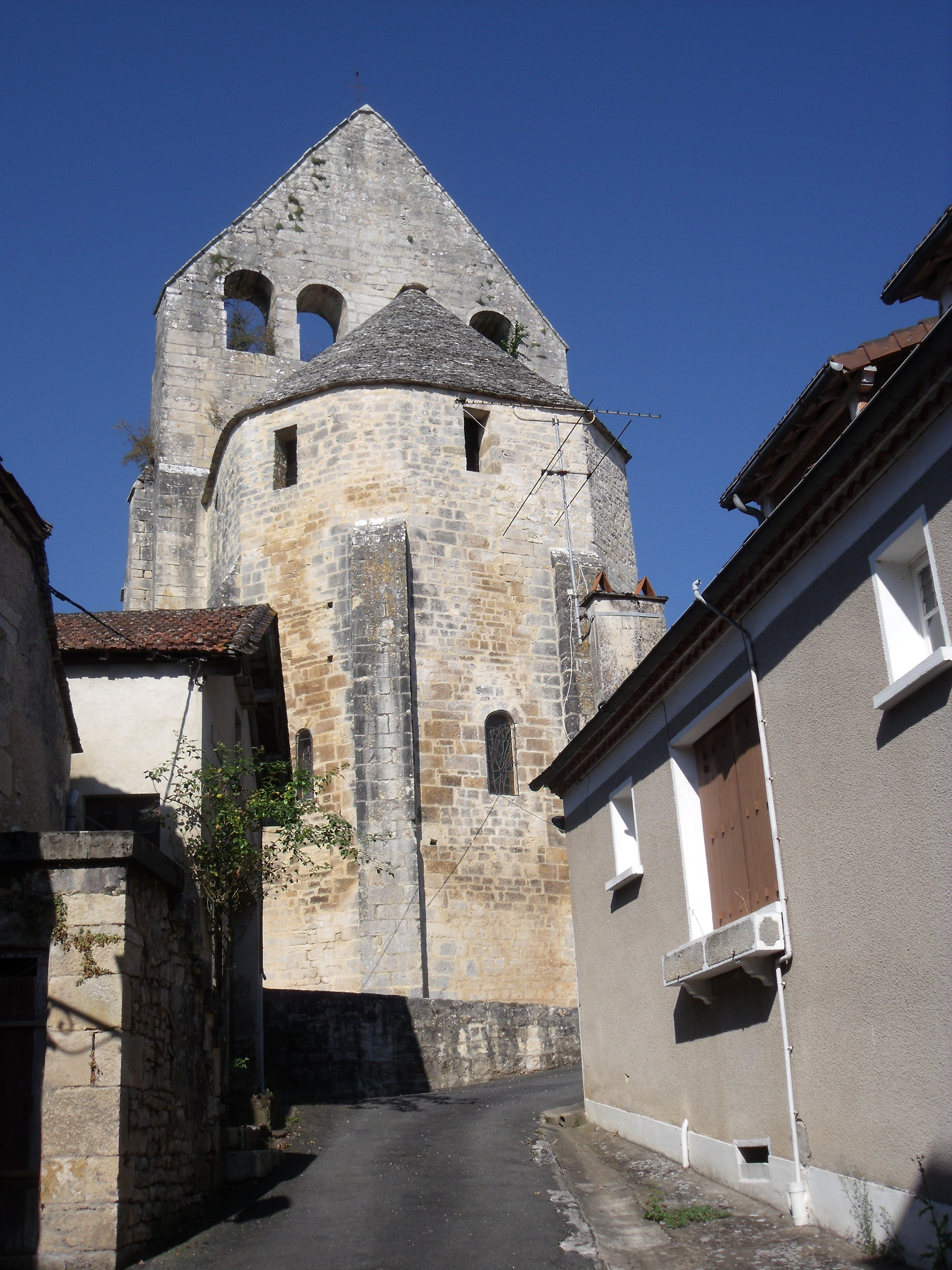
- St. Martin's church in Ajat

- Coat of arms
- Location of Ajat
- Location within France Location within Nouvelle-Aquitaine
- Coordinates: 45°09′26″N 1°01′01″E
- Country: France
- Region: Nouvelle-Aquitaine
- Department: Dordogne
- Arrondissement: Sarlat-la-Canéda
- Canton: Haut-Périgord noir
- Intercommunality: Terrassonnais en Périgord Noir Thenon Hautefort

Government
  - Mayor (2020–2026): Didier Clerjoux
- Area^{1}: 21.95 km^{2} (8.47 sq mi)
- Highest elevation: 284 m (932 ft)
- Lowest elevation: 148 m (486 ft)
- Population (2023): 307
  - Density: 14.0/km^{2} (36.2/sq mi)
- Time zone: UTC+01:00 (CET)
  - Summer (DST): UTC+02:00 (CEST)
- INSEE/Postal code: 24004 /24210
- ^{1} French Land Register data, which excludes lakes, ponds, glaciers > 1 km^{2} (0.386 sq mi or 247 acres) and river estuaries.

Ajat (French pronunciation: [aʒa]; Occitan: Ajac d'Aubaròcha) is a commune in the Dordogne department in Nouvelle-Aquitaine in southwestern France.

== History and geography ==
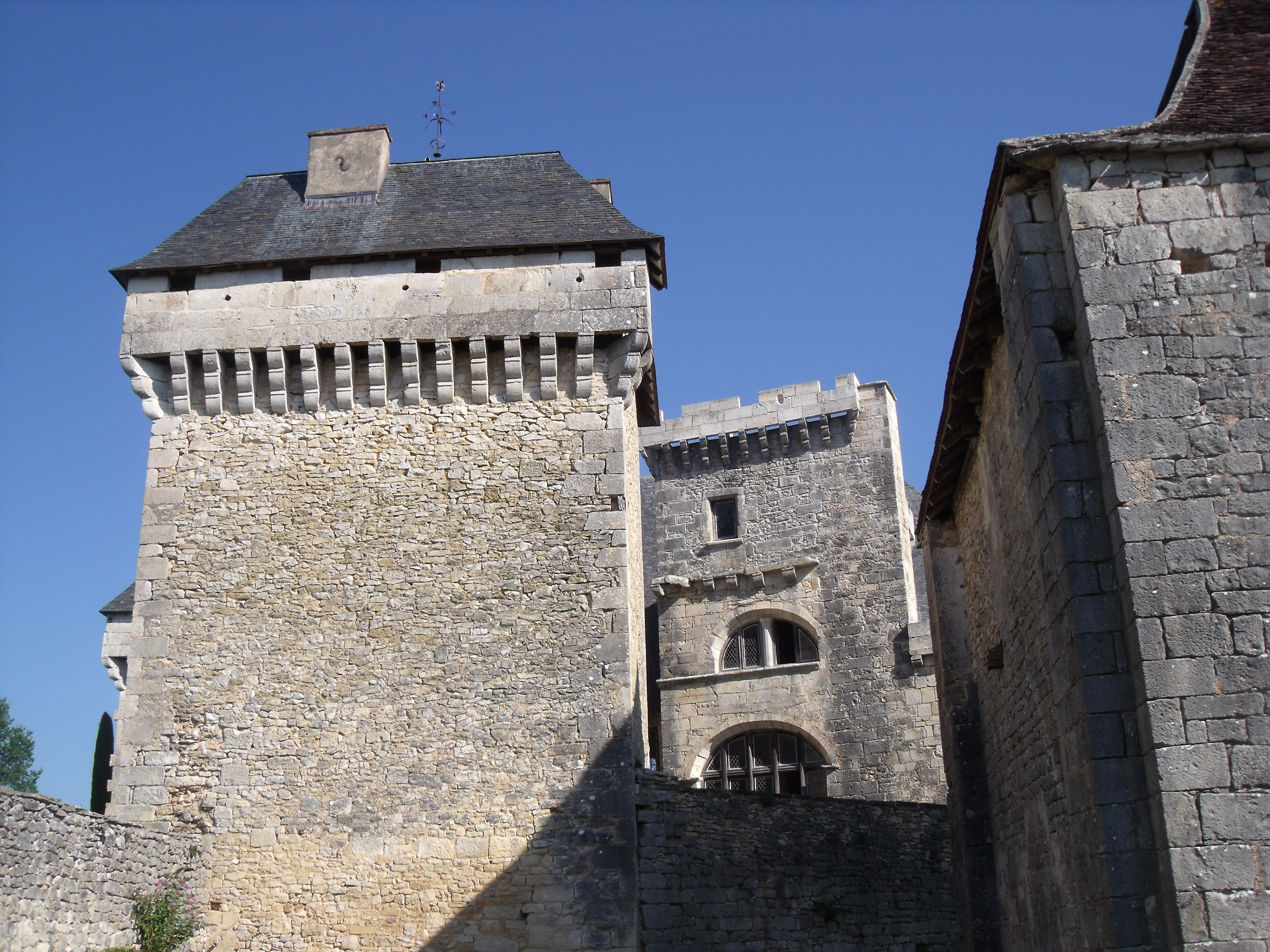
Château d'Ajat

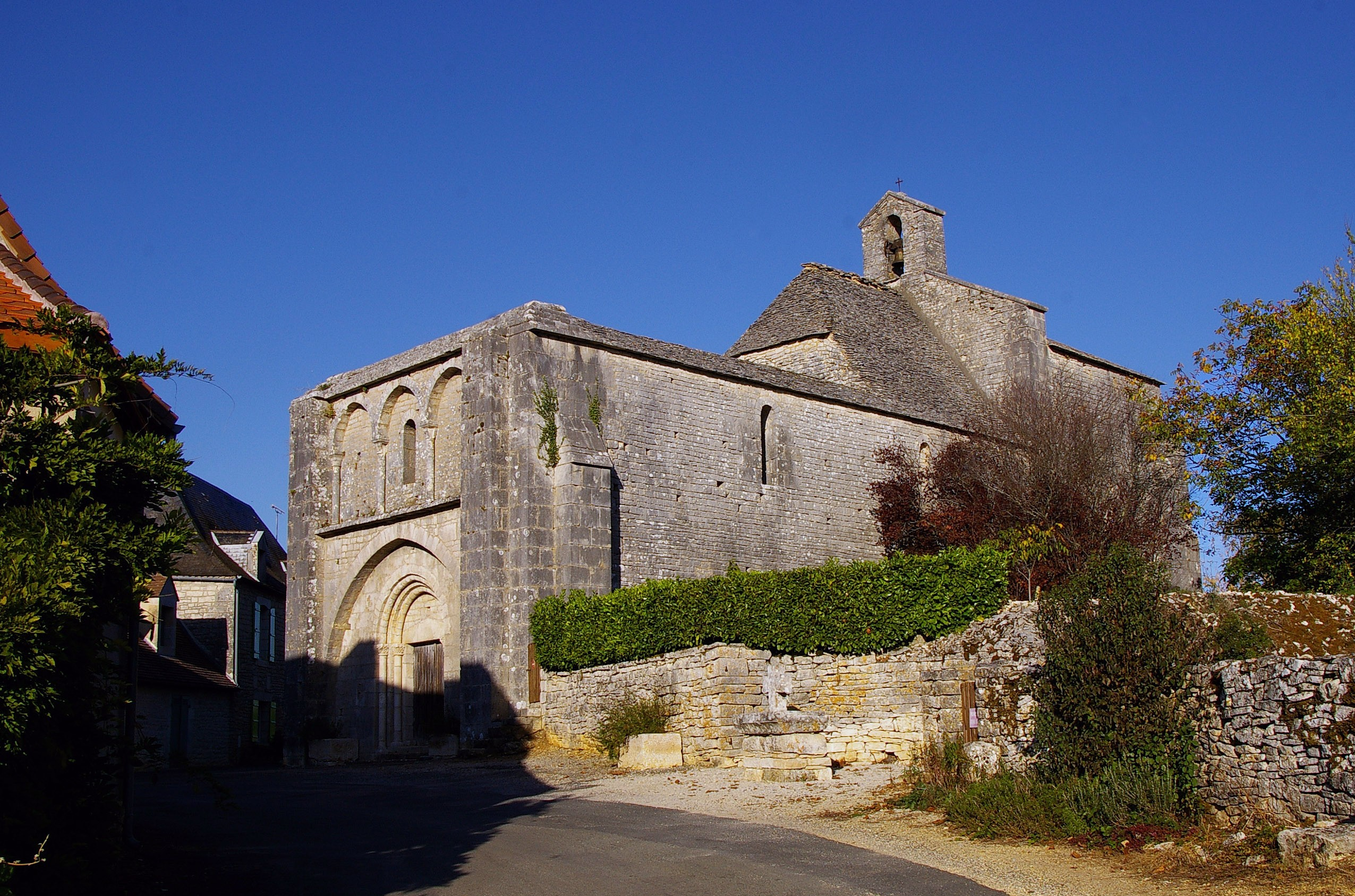
Eglise Saint-Barthélemy de Beauzens

The village of Ajat, set on a hill rising agricultural fields and woodland, is built around the historically important church, the Eglise Saint Martin which dates from the 12th century. François de Hautefort is buried there. The castle dates to the fifteenth century (with part from the fourteenth) and was once connected to the church via a wooden bridge. A coat of arms of the Hautefort barony is visible.

In a document dating from 1158 (the Cartulaire Cadouin) the name 'Abzacum' is mentioned for the first time, describing a farm dating back to the Gallo-Roman era. A Roman road linking Vesunna (Périgueux) and Lugdunum (Lyon) ran by or close to the town. In the Middle Ages, the name became 'Abzac', one of the oldest family names in Périgord. The town was on a secondary route for pilgrims following the Way of St. James to Santiago de Compostela, and a house dating to 1527 was a relay point. In the thirteenth century Ajat's church was occupied by the Knights Templar, before the order was disbanded. By the 16th century Ajat was under the control of the Hautefort barony, based in a town to the east.

The Ajat commune has limestone woodland classified in the French system as being of special scientific interest (SSSI). The town has a public swimming pool in the summer months, and there is an occasional restaurant in the grounds of the castle. A small shop has now closed. Surrounding hamlets include Beauzens and Les Fouilloux, the latter consisting of only six dwellings. The commune of Beauzens joined Ajat in the late 1700s. The Church of St. Bartholomew in Beauzens (Eglise Saint-Barthélemy de Beauzens) dates to 1000, making it one of the oldest in the region. It has a Romanesque facade.

Although the commune has seen little population increase, there is some new building and in recent years there has been some refurbishment of older properties for use as second homes and tourist stays. The nearest town with shopping and public facilities is Thenon.

== Population ==
Residents are known as Ajacois in French. Ajat is home to the French artist Jeylina Ever.

Historical population
Year	Pop.	±% p.a.
1968	306	—
1975	301	−0.24%
1982	297	−0.19%
1990	275	−0.96%
1999	281	+0.24%
2007	304	+0.99%
2012	341	+2.32%
2017	317	−1.45%
2023	307	−0.53%
Source: INSEE

== See also ==
- Communes of the Dordogne département
