= Badefols-d'Ans =

- Commune
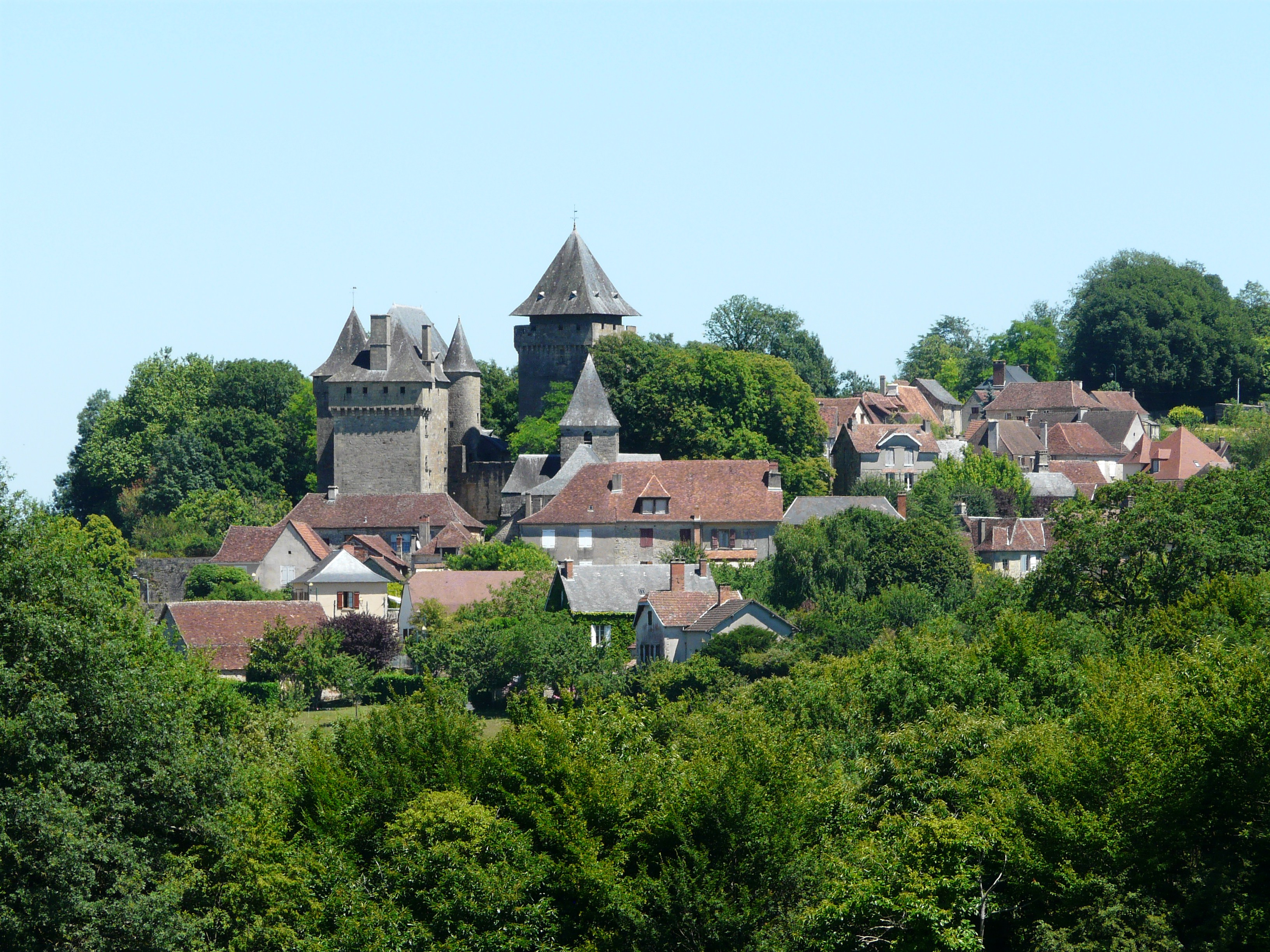
- A general view of Badefols-d'Ans

- Coat of arms
- Location of Badefols-d'Ans
- Location within France Location within Nouvelle-Aquitaine
- Coordinates: 45°13′51″N 1°11′54″E
- Country: France
- Region: Nouvelle-Aquitaine
- Department: Dordogne
- Arrondissement: Sarlat-la-Canéda
- Canton: Haut-Périgord Noir

Government
  - Mayor (2020–2026): Sylviane Grandchamp
- Area^{1}: 18.34 km^{2} (7.08 sq mi)
- Elevation: 293 m (961 ft)
- Highest elevation: 348 m (1,142 ft)
- Lowest elevation: 165 m (541 ft)
- Population (2023): 421
  - Density: 23.0/km^{2} (59.5/sq mi)
- Time zone: UTC+01:00 (CET)
  - Summer (DST): UTC+02:00 (CEST)
- INSEE/Postal code: 24021 /24390
- ^{1} French Land Register data, which excludes lakes, ponds, glaciers > 1 km^{2} (0.386 sq mi or 247 acres) and river estuaries.

Badefols-d'Ans (French pronunciation: [badfɔl dɑ̃s]; Occitan: Badafòu d'Ans) is a commune in the Dordogne department in southwestern France.

== Population ==
Historical population
Year	Pop.	±% p.a.
1968	545	—
1975	518	−0.72%
1982	511	−0.19%
1990	451	−1.55%
1999	457	+0.15%
2007	464	+0.19%
2012	453	−0.48%
2017	404	−2.26%
2023	421	+0.69%
Source: INSEE

== See also ==
- Communes of the Dordogne department
