= Canton of Haut-Périgord Noir =

Coordinates: 45.14°N 1.07°E

The canton of Haut-Périgord Noir is an administrative division of the Dordogne department, southwestern France. It was created at the French canton reorganisation which came into effect in March 2015. Its seat is in Thenon.

It consists of the following communes:

1. Ajat
2. Auriac-du-Périgord
3. Azerat
4. La Bachellerie
5. Badefols-d'Ans
6. Bars
7. Bassillac et Auberoche (partly)
8. Beauregard-de-Terrasson
9. Boisseuilh
10. La Chapelle-Saint-Jean
11. Châtres
12. Chourgnac
13. Coubjours
14. Fossemagne
15. Gabillou
16. Granges-d'Ans
17. Hautefort
18. Le Lardin-Saint-Lazare
19. Limeyrat
20. Montagnac-d'Auberoche
21. Nailhac
22. Peyrignac
23. Sainte-Eulalie-d'Ans
24. Sainte-Orse
25. Sainte-Trie
26. Saint-Rabier
27. Teillots
28. Temple-Laguyon
29. Thenon
30. Tourtoirac
31. Villac
