= Auriac-du-Périgord =

- Commune
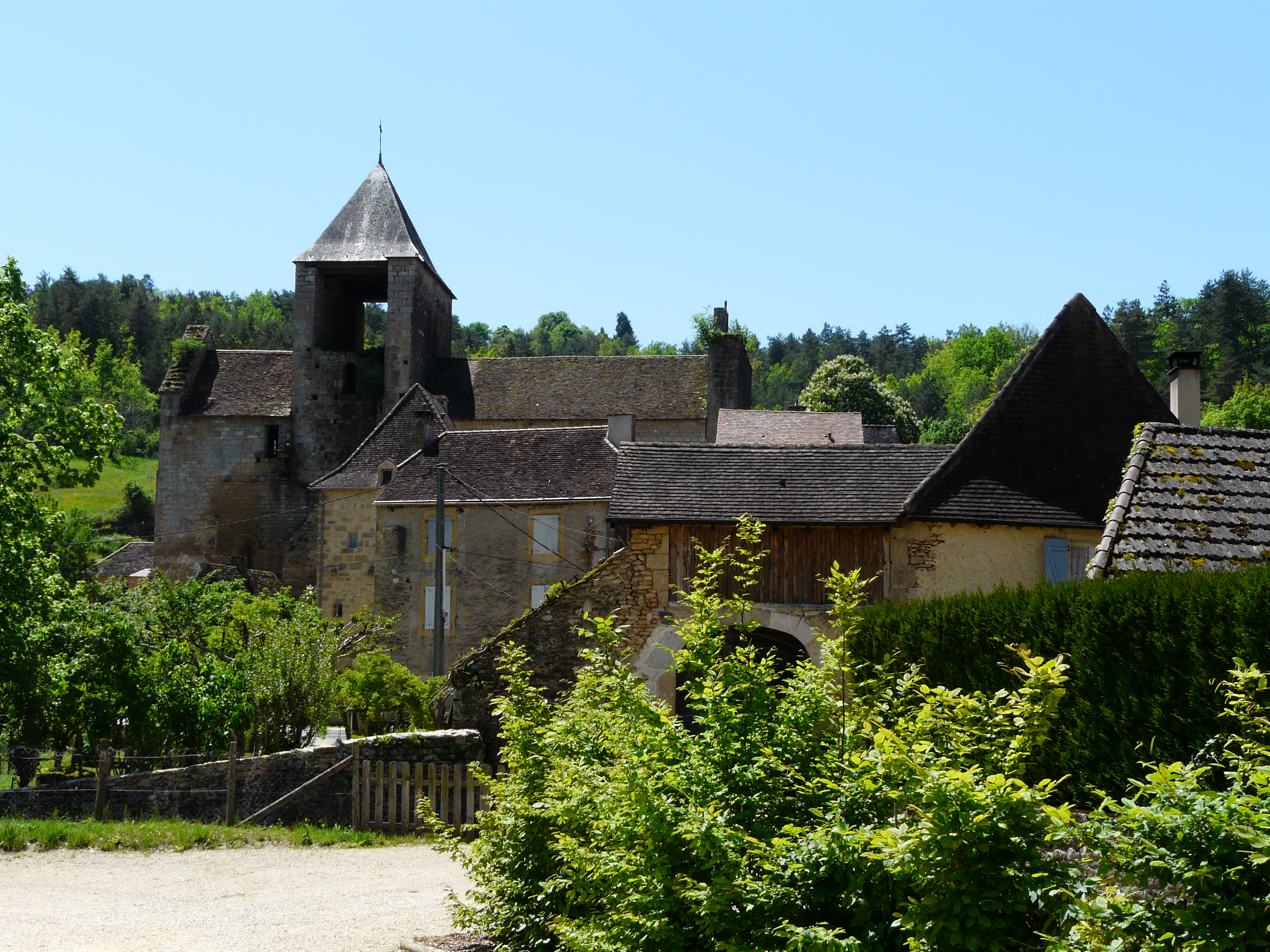
- The church and surroundings in Auriac-du-Périgord
- Location of Auriac-du-Périgord
- Location within France Location within Nouvelle-Aquitaine
- Coordinates: 45°06′26″N 1°08′15″E
- Country: France
- Region: Nouvelle-Aquitaine
- Department: Dordogne
- Arrondissement: Sarlat-la-Canéda
- Canton: Haut-Périgord Noir
- Intercommunality: CC Terrassonnais Périgord Noir Thenon Hautefort

Government
  - Mayor (2020–2026): Dominique Duruy
- Area^{1}: 18.63 km^{2} (7.19 sq mi)
- Elevation: 90 m (300 ft)
- Highest elevation: 293 m (961 ft)
- Lowest elevation: 93 m (305 ft)
- Population (2023): 397
  - Density: 21.3/km^{2} (55.2/sq mi)
- Time zone: UTC+01:00 (CET)
  - Summer (DST): UTC+02:00 (CEST)
- INSEE/Postal code: 24018 /24290
- ^{1} French Land Register data, which excludes lakes, ponds, glaciers > 1 km^{2} (0.386 sq mi or 247 acres) and river estuaries.

Auriac-du-Périgord (French pronunciation: [oʁjak dy peʁiɡɔʁ], literally Auriac of the Périgord; Occitan: Auriac de Perigòrd) is a commune in the Dordogne department in Nouvelle-Aquitaine in southwestern France.

== Population ==
Historical population
Year	Pop.	±% p.a.
1968	338	—
1975	316	−0.96%
1982	333	+0.75%
1990	377	+1.56%
1999	398	+0.60%
2007	413	+0.46%
2012	411	−0.10%
2017	383	−1.40%
2023	397	+0.60%
Source: INSEE

== See also ==
- Communes of the Dordogne department
