= Le Lardin-Saint-Lazare =

- Commune
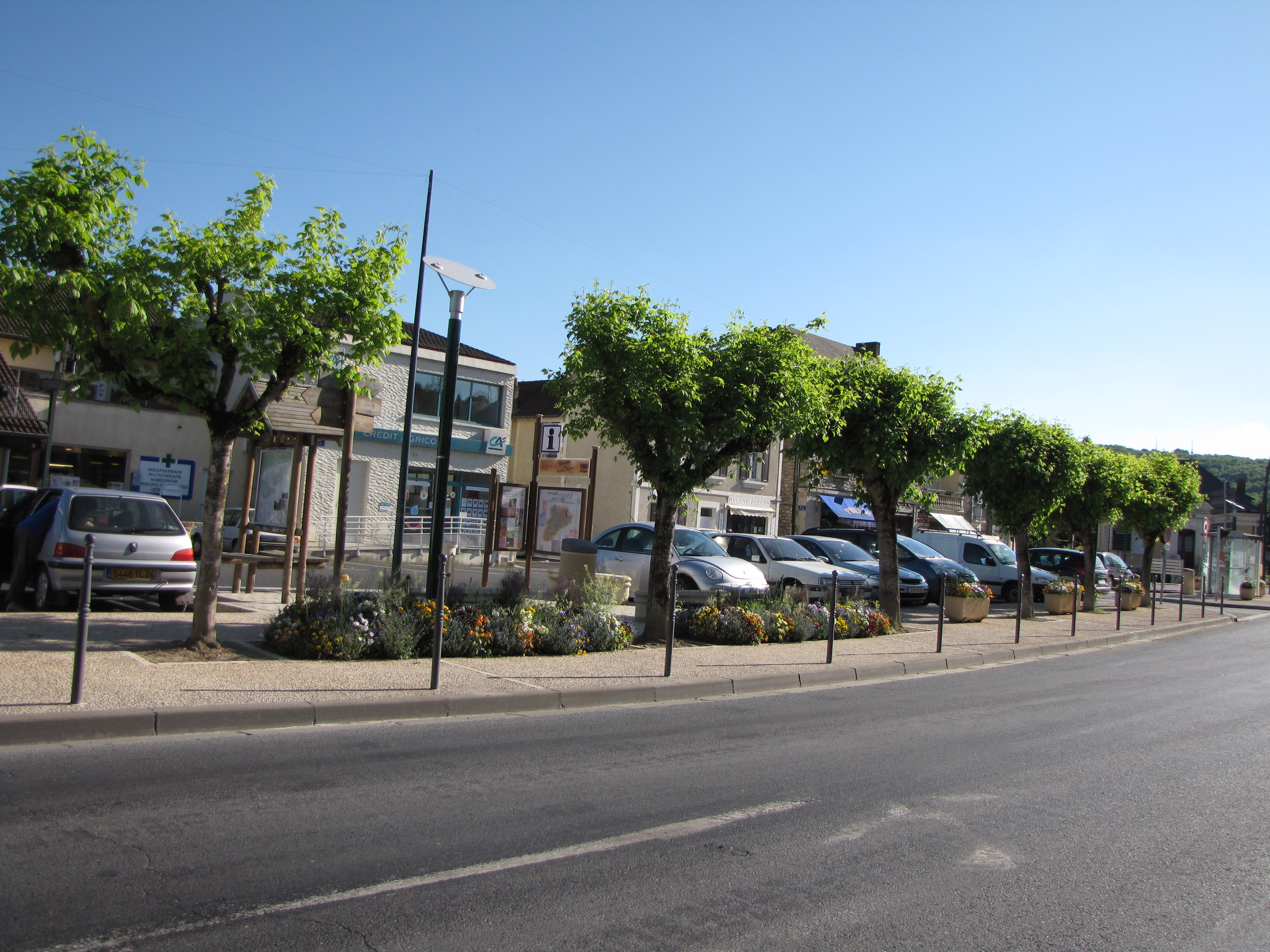
- A view within Le Lardin

- Coat of arms
- Location of Le Lardin-Saint-Lazare
- Location within France Location within Nouvelle-Aquitaine
- Coordinates: 45°07′50″N 1°13′39″E
- Country: France
- Region: Nouvelle-Aquitaine
- Department: Dordogne
- Arrondissement: Sarlat-la-Canéda
- Canton: Haut-Périgord Noir

Government
  - Mayor (2020–2026): Francine Bourra
- Area^{1}: 10.85 km^{2} (4.19 sq mi)
- Elevation: 86 m (282 ft)
- Highest elevation: 246 m (807 ft)
- Lowest elevation: 79 m (259 ft)
- Population (2023): 1,672
  - Density: 154.1/km^{2} (399.1/sq mi)
- Time zone: UTC+01:00 (CET)
  - Summer (DST): UTC+02:00 (CEST)
- INSEE/Postal code: 24229 /24570
- ^{1} French Land Register data, which excludes lakes, ponds, glaciers > 1 km^{2} (0.386 sq mi or 247 acres) and river estuaries.

Le Lardin-Saint-Lazare (Occitan: Lo Bacò Sant Lazari) is a commune in the Dordogne department in Nouvelle-Aquitaine in southwestern France. Condat-Le Lardin station has rail connections to Bordeaux, Périgueux and Brive-la-Gaillarde.

== Population ==
Historical population
Year	Pop.	±% p.a.
1968	1,761	—
1975	1,982	+1.70%
1982	2,037	+0.39%
1990	2,047	+0.06%
1999	1,846	−1.14%
2007	1,974	+0.84%
2012	1,862	−1.16%
2017	1,753	−1.20%
2023	1,672	−0.79%
Source: INSEE

== See also ==
- Communes of the Dordogne department
