= Fossemagne =

- Commune
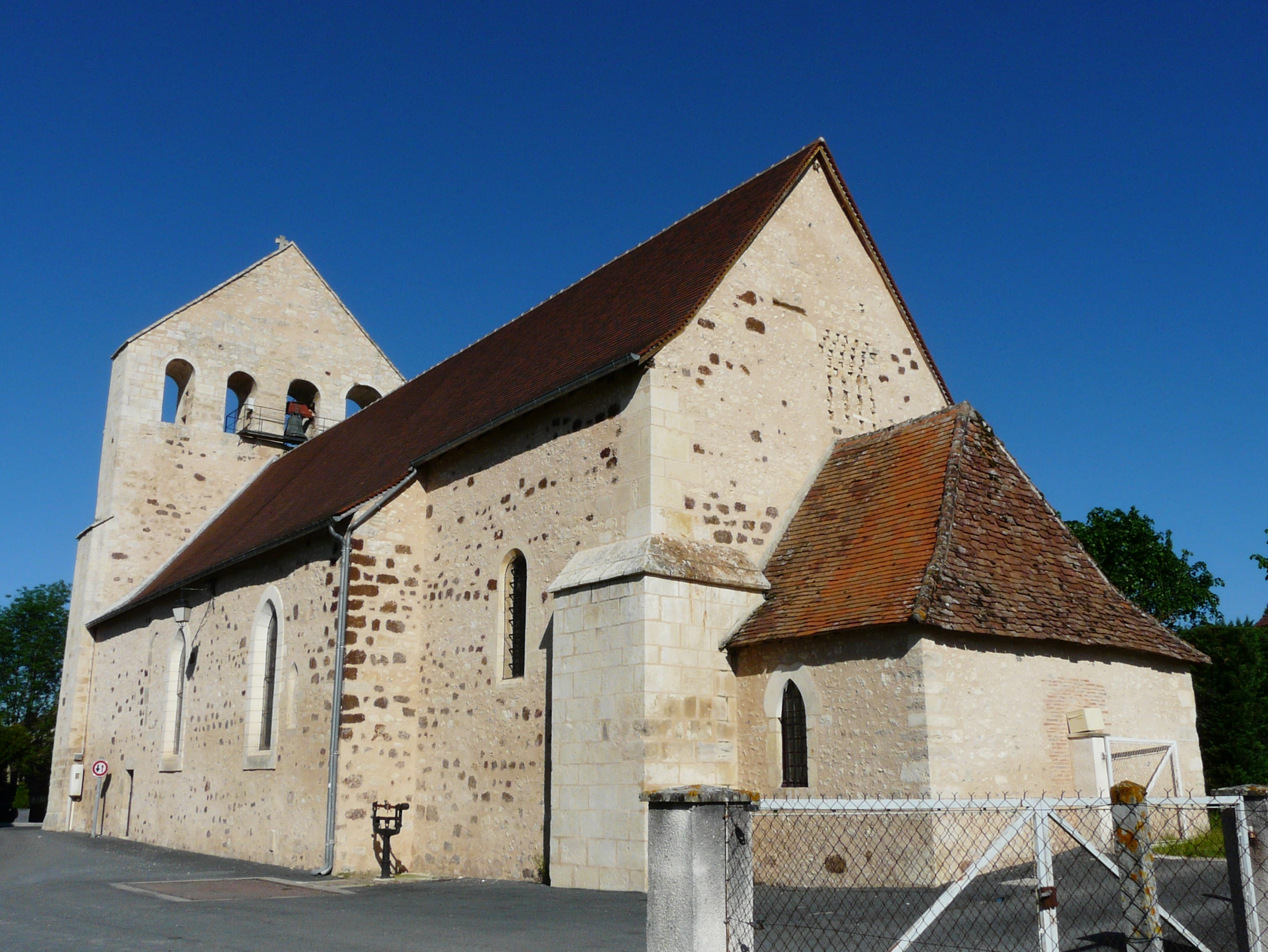
- The church in Fossemagne
- Location of Fossemagne
- Location within France Location within Nouvelle-Aquitaine
- Coordinates: 45°07′40″N 0°59′10″E
- Country: France
- Region: Nouvelle-Aquitaine
- Department: Dordogne
- Arrondissement: Sarlat-la-Canéda
- Canton: Haut-Périgord Noir

Government
  - Mayor (2020–2026): Annie Delage
- Area^{1}: 21.88 km^{2} (8.45 sq mi)
- Highest elevation: 282 m (925 ft)
- Lowest elevation: 173 m (568 ft)
- Population (2023): 556
  - Density: 25.4/km^{2} (65.8/sq mi)
- Time zone: UTC+01:00 (CET)
  - Summer (DST): UTC+02:00 (CEST)
- INSEE/Postal code: 24188 /24210
- ^{1} French Land Register data, which excludes lakes, ponds, glaciers > 1 km^{2} (0.386 sq mi or 247 acres) and river estuaries.

Fossemagne (French pronunciation: [fosmaɲ]; Occitan: Fòssamanha) is a commune in the Dordogne département in Nouvelle-Aquitaine in southwestern France.

== Population ==
Historical population
Year	Pop.	±% p.a.
1968	556	—
1975	505	−1.37%
1982	544	+1.07%
1990	535	−0.21%
1999	528	−0.15%
2007	596	+1.53%
2012	612	+0.53%
2017	537	−2.58%
2023	556	+0.58%
Source: INSEE

== See also ==
- Communes of the Dordogne department
