= Gabillou =

- Commune
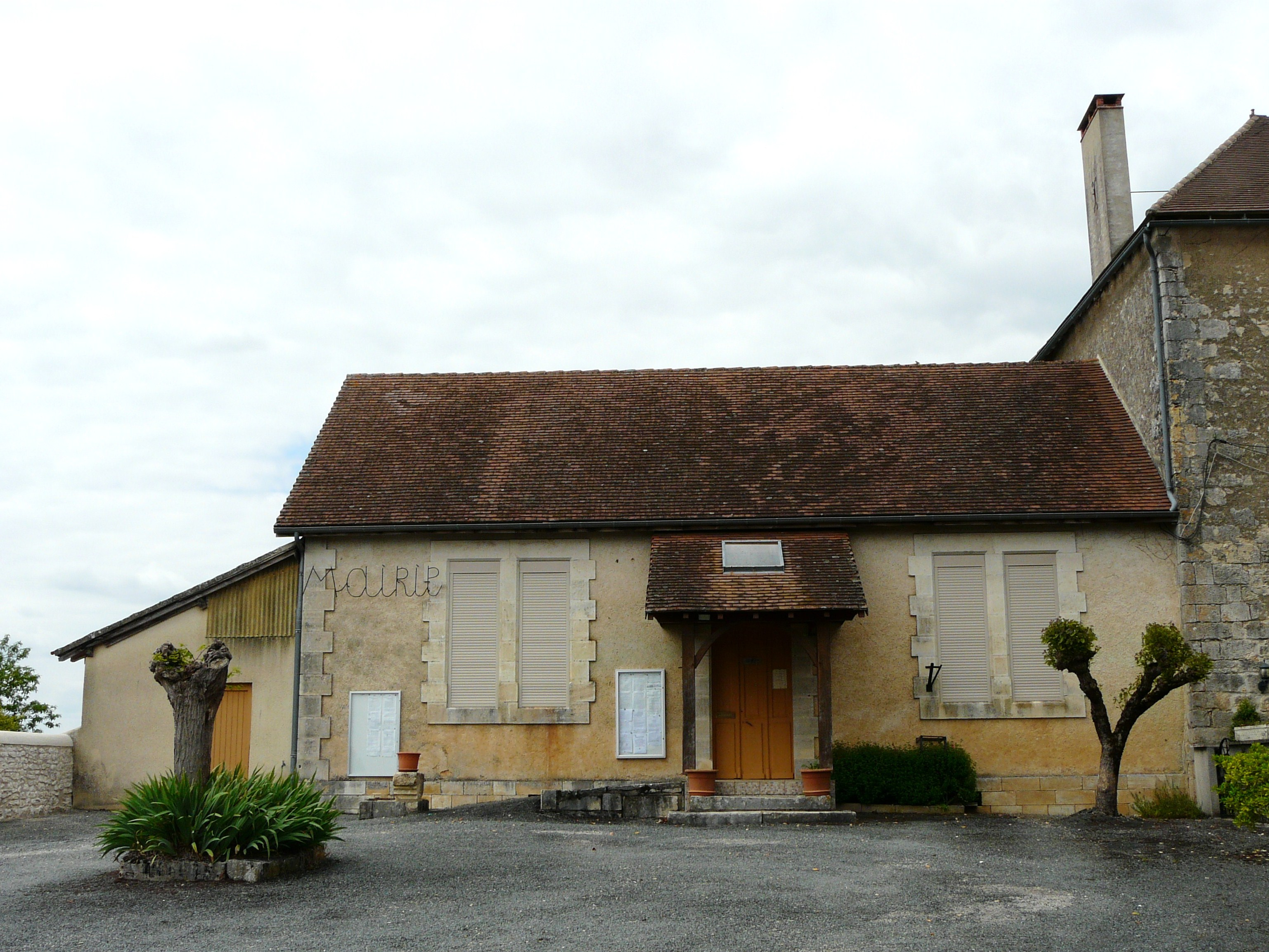
- The town hall in Gabillou
- Location of Gabillou
- Location within France Location within Nouvelle-Aquitaine
- Coordinates: 45°12′24″N 1°02′08″E
- Country: France
- Region: Nouvelle-Aquitaine
- Department: Dordogne
- Arrondissement: Sarlat-la-Canéda
- Canton: Haut-Périgord Noir
- Intercommunality: Terrassonnais en Périgord Noir Thenon Hautefort

Government
  - Mayor (2020–2026): Gaston Grand
- Area^{1}: 7.92 km^{2} (3.06 sq mi)
- Elevation: 221 m (725 ft)
- Highest elevation: 238 m (781 ft)
- Lowest elevation: 145 m (476 ft)
- Population (2023): 95
  - Density: 12/km^{2} (31/sq mi)
- Time zone: UTC+01:00 (CET)
  - Summer (DST): UTC+02:00 (CEST)
- INSEE/Postal code: 24192 /24210
- ^{1} French Land Register data, which excludes lakes, ponds, glaciers > 1 km^{2} (0.386 sq mi or 247 acres) and river estuaries.

Gabillou (French pronunciation: [ɡabiju]; Occitan: Gabilhon) is a commune in the Dordogne department in Nouvelle-Aquitaine in southwestern France.

== Population ==
Historical population
Year	Pop.	±% p.a.
1968	130	—
1975	97	−4.10%
1982	94	−0.45%
1990	104	+1.27%
1999	89	−1.72%
2007	102	+1.72%
2012	92	−2.04%
2017	94	+0.43%
2023	95	+0.18%
Source: INSEE

== See also ==
- Communes of the Dordogne department
