= Montagnac-d'Auberoche =

- Commune
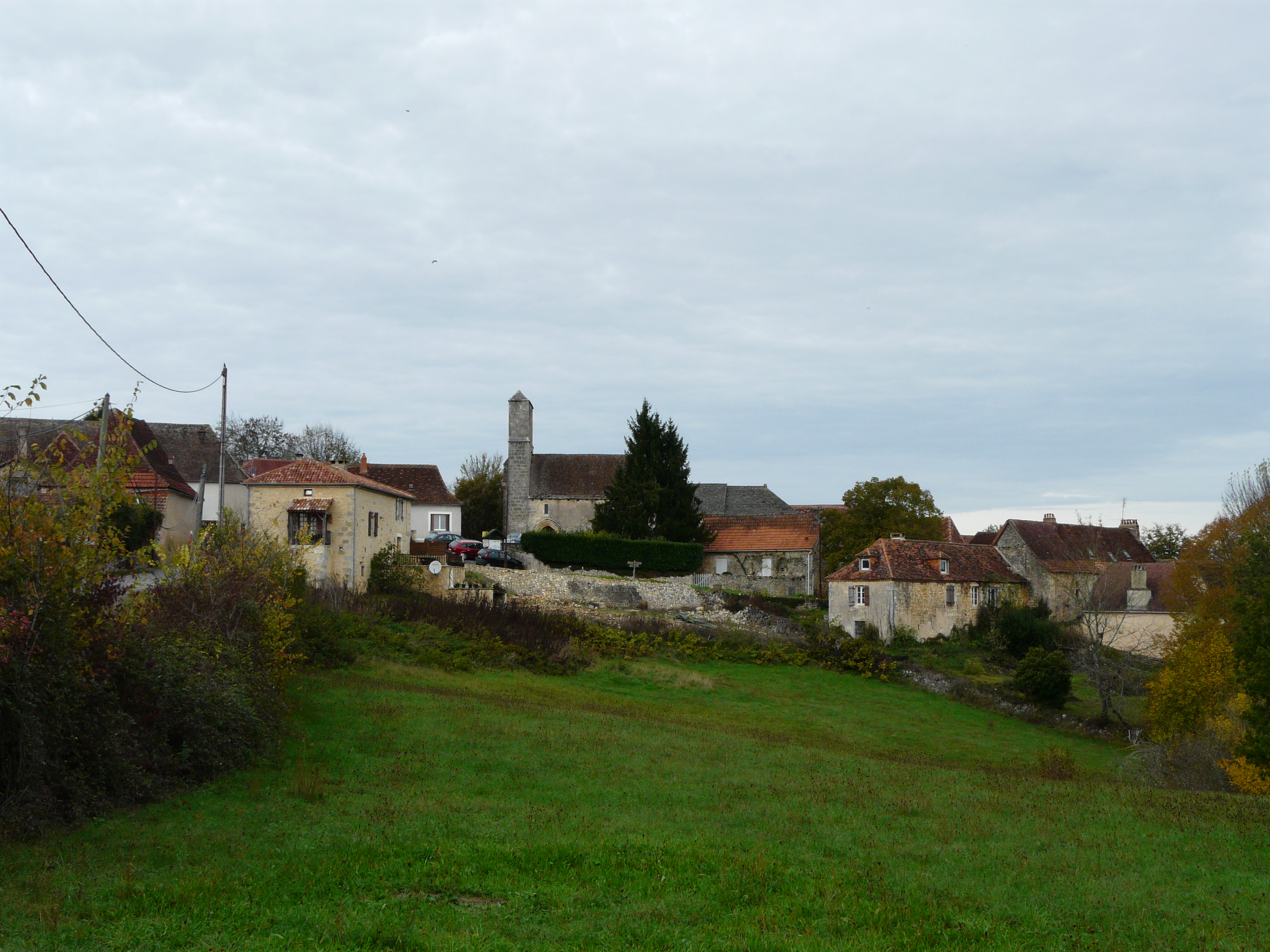
- A general view of Montagnac-d'Auberoche

- Coat of arms
- Location of Montagnac-d'Auberoche
- Location within France Location within Nouvelle-Aquitaine
- Coordinates: 45°11′15″N 0°57′23″E
- Country: France
- Region: Nouvelle-Aquitaine
- Department: Dordogne
- Arrondissement: Sarlat-la-Canéda
- Canton: Haut-Périgord Noir

Government
  - Mayor (2020–2026): Alexandra Dumas
- Area^{1}: 10.02 km^{2} (3.87 sq mi)
- Highest elevation: 255 m (837 ft)
- Lowest elevation: 128 m (420 ft)
- Population (2023): 137
  - Density: 13.7/km^{2} (35.4/sq mi)
- Time zone: UTC+01:00 (CET)
  - Summer (DST): UTC+02:00 (CEST)
- INSEE/Postal code: 24284 /24210
- ^{1} French Land Register data, which excludes lakes, ponds, glaciers > 1 km^{2} (0.386 sq mi or 247 acres) and river estuaries.

Montagnac-d'Auberoche (French pronunciation: [mɔ̃taɲak dobʁɔʃ]; Occitan: Montanhac d'Aubaròcha) is a commune in the Dordogne department in Nouvelle-Aquitaine in southwestern France. The village is situated on a hill near the river Auvézère, 19 km east of Périgueux.

== Population ==
Historical population
| Year | Pop. | ±% p.a. |
|---|---|---|
| 1968 | 102 | — |
| 1975 | 96 | −0.86% |
| 1982 | 99 | +0.44% |
| 1990 | 111 | +1.44% |
| 1999 | 105 | −0.62% |
| 2007 | 130 | +2.71% |
| 2012 | 145 | +2.21% |
| 2017 | 146 | +0.14% |
| 2023 | 137 | −1.05% |
Source: INSEE

== See also ==
- Communes of the Dordogne department
