= Limeyrat =

- Commune
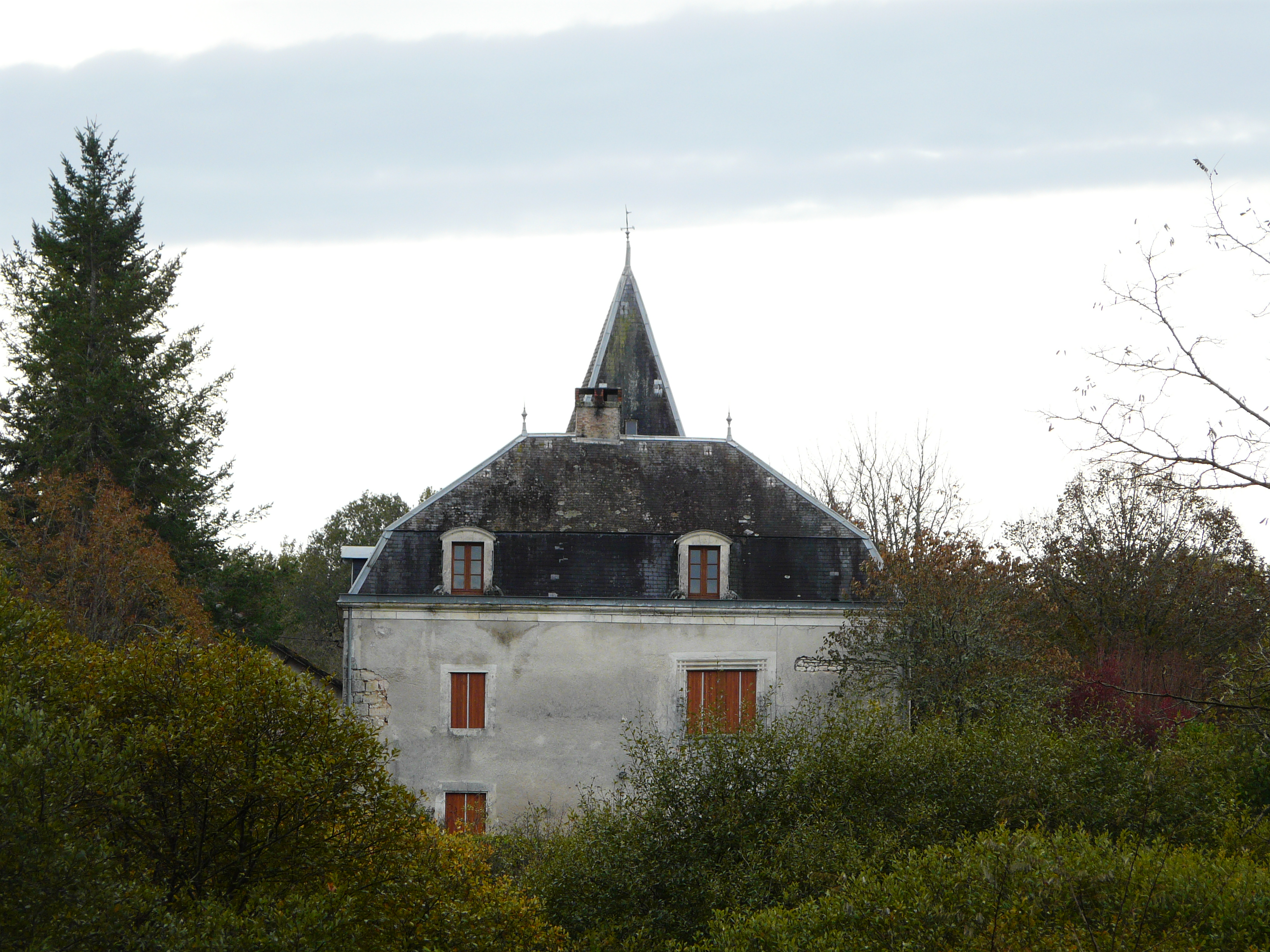
- Chateau

- Coat of arms
- Location of Limeyrat
- Location within France Location within Nouvelle-Aquitaine
- Coordinates: 45°09′41″N 0°58′54″E
- Country: France
- Region: Nouvelle-Aquitaine
- Department: Dordogne
- Arrondissement: Sarlat-la-Canéda
- Canton: Haut-Périgord Noir

Government
  - Mayor (2020–2026): Claude Sautier
- Area^{1}: 19.72 km^{2} (7.61 sq mi)
- Highest elevation: 266 m (873 ft)
- Lowest elevation: 143 m (469 ft)
- Population (2023): 424
  - Density: 21.5/km^{2} (55.7/sq mi)
- Time zone: UTC+01:00 (CET)
  - Summer (DST): UTC+02:00 (CEST)
- INSEE/Postal code: 24241 /24210
- ^{1} French Land Register data, which excludes lakes, ponds, glaciers > 1 km^{2} (0.386 sq mi or 247 acres) and river estuaries.

Limeyrat (French pronunciation: [limeʁa]; Occitan: Limeirac) is a commune in the Dordogne department in Nouvelle-Aquitaine in southwestern France.

== Population ==
Historical population
Year	Pop.	±% p.a.
1968	343	—
1975	394	+2.00%
1982	408	+0.50%
1990	427	+0.57%
1999	436	+0.23%
2007	447	+0.31%
2012	454	+0.31%
2017	445	−0.40%
2023	424	−0.80%
Source: INSEE

== See also ==
- Communes of the Dordogne department
