= Bars, Dordogne =

Bars
- Commune
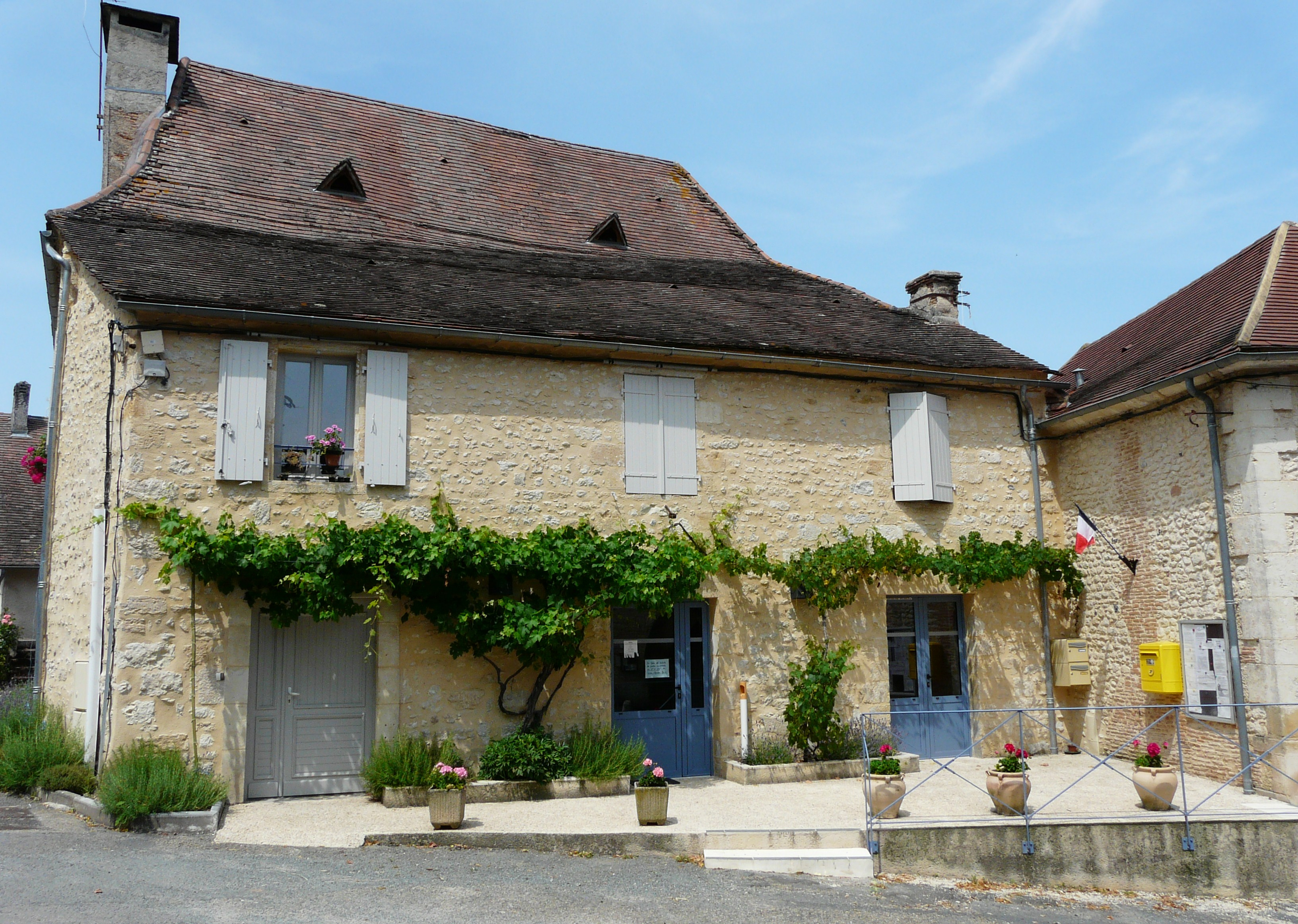
- The town hall in Bars

- Coat of arms
- Location of Bars
- Location within France Location within Nouvelle-Aquitaine
- Coordinates: 45°06′00″N 1°03′50″E
- Country: France
- Region: Nouvelle-Aquitaine
- Department: Dordogne
- Arrondissement: Sarlat-la-Canéda
- Canton: Haut-Périgord Noir
- Intercommunality: Terrassonnais en Périgord Noir Thenon Hautefort

Government
  - Mayor (2026–32): Fabienne Saulière
- Area^{1}: 22.58 km^{2} (8.72 sq mi)
- Highest elevation: 276 m (906 ft)
- Lowest elevation: 137 m (449 ft)
- Population (2023): 246
  - Density: 10.9/km^{2} (28.2/sq mi)
- Time zone: UTC+01:00 (CET)
  - Summer (DST): UTC+02:00 (CEST)
- INSEE/Postal code: 24025 /24210
- ^{1} French Land Register data, which excludes lakes, ponds, glaciers > 1 km^{2} (0.386 sq mi or 247 acres) and river estuaries.

Bars (Occitan language: Barç) is a commune in the Dordogne department in southwestern France.

== Population ==
Historical population
Year	Pop.	±% p.a.
1968	319	—
1975	254	−3.20%
1982	228	−1.53%
1990	217	−0.62%
1999	214	−0.15%
2007	239	+1.39%
2012	226	−1.11%
2017	243	+1.46%
2023	246	+0.20%
Source: INSEE

== See also ==
- Communes of the Dordogne department
