= Thenon =

- Commune
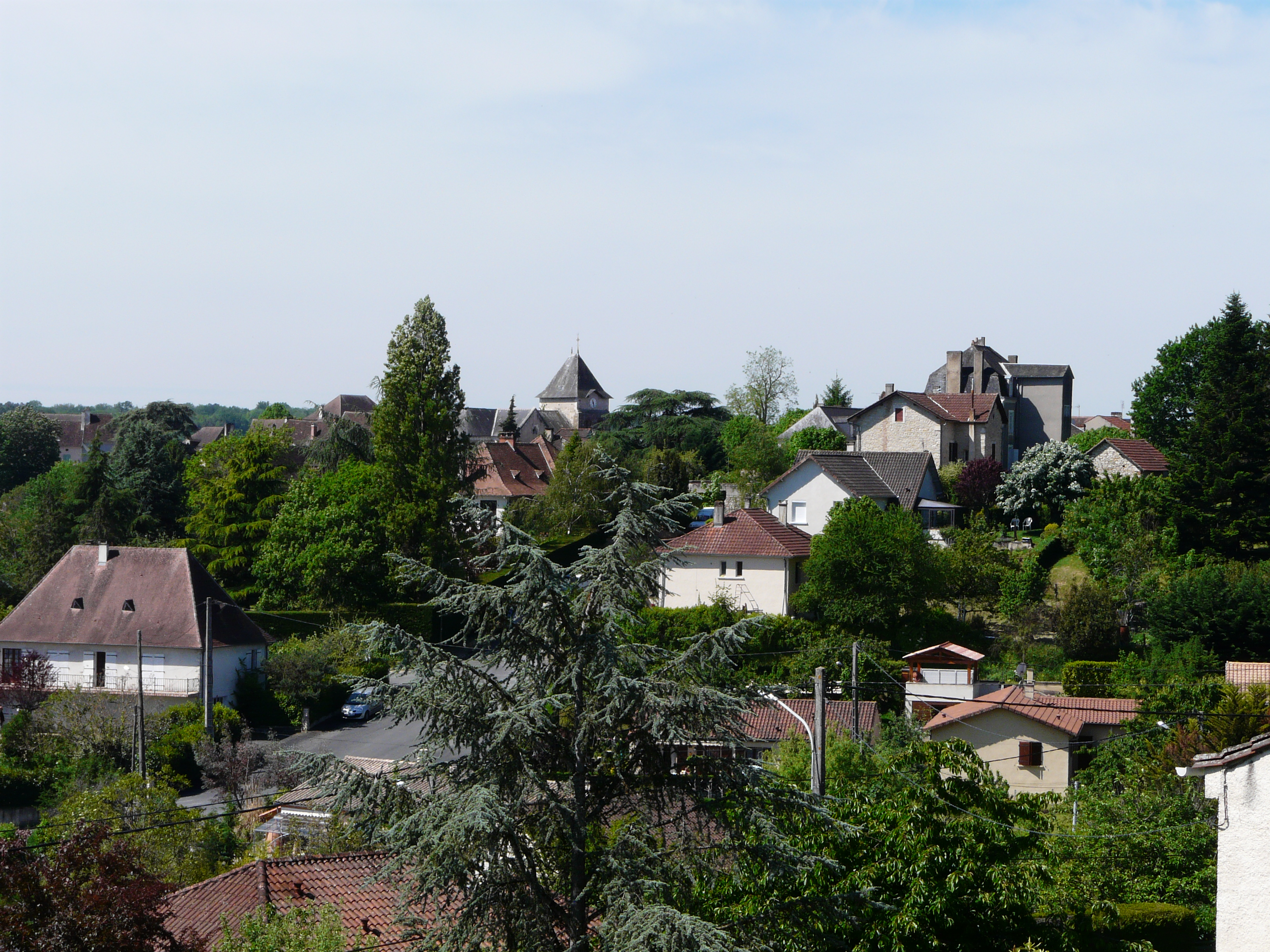
- A general view of Thenon

- Coat of arms
- Location of Thenon
- Location within France Location within Nouvelle-Aquitaine
- Coordinates: 45°08′18″N 1°04′18″E
- Country: France
- Region: Nouvelle-Aquitaine
- Department: Dordogne
- Arrondissement: Sarlat-la-Canéda
- Canton: Haut-Périgord Noir

Government
  - Mayor (2020–2026): Jean-Luc Blanchard
- Area^{1}: 25.92 km^{2} (10.01 sq mi)
- Highest elevation: 285 m (935 ft)
- Lowest elevation: 136 m (446 ft)
- Population (2023): 1,282
  - Density: 49.46/km^{2} (128.1/sq mi)
- Time zone: UTC+01:00 (CET)
  - Summer (DST): UTC+02:00 (CEST)
- INSEE/Postal code: 24550 /24210
- ^{1} French Land Register data, which excludes lakes, ponds, glaciers > 1 km^{2} (0.386 sq mi or 247 acres) and river estuaries.

Thenon (French pronunciation: [tənɔ̃]; Occitan: Tenon) is a commune in the Dordogne department in Nouvelle-Aquitaine in southwestern France.

== Geography ==
The market town of Thenon is situated on the main road between Brive la Gaillarde (40 km east) and Périgueux (33 km west), surrounded by farmland and forests. The northern edge of Thenon is set on a prominent ridge. Its recent history is strongly linked to the road network. The D6089 road passes through Thenon and continues west to Bordeaux on the coast. For many years, Thenon was blighted by this road, a frequently congested main haulage and tourist route. Heavy road traffic nonetheless brought stopovers and tourists, retail trade, and demand for accommodation and restaurants. But in the mid-2000s, the east-west A89/E70 toll road (la Transeuropéenne) was opened, passing north of Thenon and funnelling the major traffic flow away from the town. Thenon station is several kilometers north of the town centre and has rail connections to Bordeaux, Périgueux and Brive-la-Gaillarde. Thenon was not given an exit (sortie) close by; thus, it is now bypassed.

== Climate ==
On average, Thenon experiences 34 days per year with a minimum temperature below 0 °C (32.0 °F), 0.4 days per year with a minimum temperature below −10 °C (14.0 °F), 2.5 days per year with a maximum temperature below 0 °C (32.0 °F), and 19.9 days per year with a maximum temperature above 30 °C (86.0 °F). The record high temperature was 39.0 °C (102.2 °F) on 25 July 2019 and 7 August 2020, while the record low temperature was −14.3 °C (6.3 °F) on 9 February 2012.

Climate data for Thenon, France, 1991–2020 normals, extremes 2006–present
Month	Jan	Feb	Mar	Apr	May	Jun	Jul	Aug	Sep	Oct	Nov	Dec	Year
Record high °C (°F)	17.4 (63.3)	24.1 (75.4)	25.3 (77.5)	28.0 (82.4)	30.7 (87.3)	37.2 (99.0)	39.0 (102.2)	39.0 (102.2)	35.1 (95.2)	29.9 (85.8)	23.3 (73.9)	17.8 (64.0)	39.0 (102.2)
Mean daily maximum °C (°F)	8.3 (46.9)	10.2 (50.4)	13.7 (56.7)	17.6 (63.7)	20.3 (68.5)	24.1 (75.4)	26.7 (80.1)	26.2 (79.2)	23.3 (73.9)	18.4 (65.1)	12.6 (54.7)	9.3 (48.7)	17.6 (63.6)
Daily mean °C (°F)	5.3 (41.5)	6.2 (43.2)	9.1 (48.4)	12.4 (54.3)	15.0 (59.0)	18.6 (65.5)	20.7 (69.3)	20.2 (68.4)	17.7 (63.9)	13.9 (57.0)	9.2 (48.6)	6.1 (43.0)	12.9 (55.2)
Mean daily minimum °C (°F)	2.3 (36.1)	2.2 (36.0)	4.5 (40.1)	7.2 (45.0)	9.8 (49.6)	13.1 (55.6)	14.7 (58.5)	14.3 (57.7)	12.0 (53.6)	9.3 (48.7)	5.8 (42.4)	3.0 (37.4)	8.2 (46.7)
Record low °C (°F)	−8.4 (16.9)	−14.3 (6.3)	−5.8 (21.6)	−3.3 (26.1)	0.4 (32.7)	4.9 (40.8)	7.7 (45.9)	6.9 (44.4)	2.9 (37.2)	−1.9 (28.6)	−7.3 (18.9)	−9.2 (15.4)	−14.3 (6.3)
Average precipitation mm (inches)	92.5 (3.64)	73.7 (2.90)	85.0 (3.35)	75.0 (2.95)	83.9 (3.30)	83.3 (3.28)	42.9 (1.69)	59.9 (2.36)	53.4 (2.10)	76.4 (3.01)	90.5 (3.56)	90.6 (3.57)	907.1 (35.71)
Average precipitation days (≥ 1.0 mm)	13.1	10.9	13.2	10.7	10.3	9.9	6.5	7.5	8.0	9.9	12.9	11.4	124.3
Source: Meteociel

== History ==
Prehistory and history are described for the Aquitaine region, which has some of Europe's most important prehistoric cave dwellings.

The region was a strong centre of resistance against Germany in World War II. The nearby village of Rouffignac-Saint-Cernin-de-Reilhac was almost destroyed as an act of retribution after French partisans captured two German soldiers.

== Economy ==
The high street of Thenon (Av. de la 4eme République) passes north–south and is the scene of a weekly market and some shops. To the southern end is the cultural heart, the Place Pasteur with a church, older buildings (some medieval), a marketplace (shown here) and a small château dating from the 12th century (captured briefly by the English in 1439, retaken by Charles II's troops). Only part of the castle remains. Over the last 25 years, the main street has hosted at least three supermarkets, a grocer, a butcher, bars, a hardware store, 2 boulangeries, a bank and 2 chemists. However, with the reduced traffic on the D6089, the High Street has 'died' and most of its retail outlets have closed, except the boulangeries and chemists. The Mairie has offered subsidised rent to businesses willing to reoccupy the vacant stores, with some success as of 2015 when the bar/cafe was again reopened as a cooperative. A medium-sized supermarket on the now-quiet D6089 west of town has become the main retail store, with the bar and bank opposite in modern premises, and local residents feel that these closures and relocations have lost much. In addition, some commercial activity in Thenon has been lost because of the 1990s/2000s boom in French second homes, from which this region benefited through high property prices and more consumers and tax income, which has subsided. There is a primary school and middle school, the Collège Suzanne Lacore. The nearest high school is in Terrasson, 16.5 km away.

The region has a strong farming heritage, but little industrial activity or service occupations (a large paper mill east at Le Lardin). With poor soils, walnut trees, figs, and sheep are common, with few vineyards and cereals. Tertiary sector jobs are found mainly in Périgueux, 35 km away, or in the slightly larger towns like Montignac on the Vézère River, 14 km to the southeast (the nearest town to the Lascaux caves). The beautiful countryside around the town is steep and rolling, with farms interspersed with woodlands, in which the local population continues to hunt enthusiastically for rabbits, wild boar and deer. Tourism peaks in the summer when the weekly market is a little more animated and the etang (lake) below the town hosts swimming and a cafe.

The estate agent advertises in both French and English, and there are a few English and Dutch summer homes and year-round residents, mainly located outside the town in the surrounding villages. Property prices have not increased in recent years. The cheaper property prices attract overseas migrants compared to the Vézère and Dordogne villages to the south.

== Population ==
Historical population
Year	Pop.	±% p.a.
1968	1,096	—
1975	1,253	+1.93%
1982	1,259	+0.07%
1990	1,339	+0.77%
1999	1,205	−1.16%
2007	1,291	+0.87%
2012	1,280	−0.17%
2017	1,263	−0.27%
2023	1,282	+0.25%
Source: INSEE

== See also ==
- Communes of the Dordogne department
