= Veyrines =

Veyrines may refer to:

- Veyrines-de-Vergt, a commune in the Dordogne
- Veyrines-de-Domme, a commune in the Dordogne
- Tour de Veyrines in Mérignac, Gironde
- Église Sainte-Marie de Veyrines, a church in Saint-Symphorien-de-Mahun
