= Saint-Aubin-de-Nabirat =

- Commune
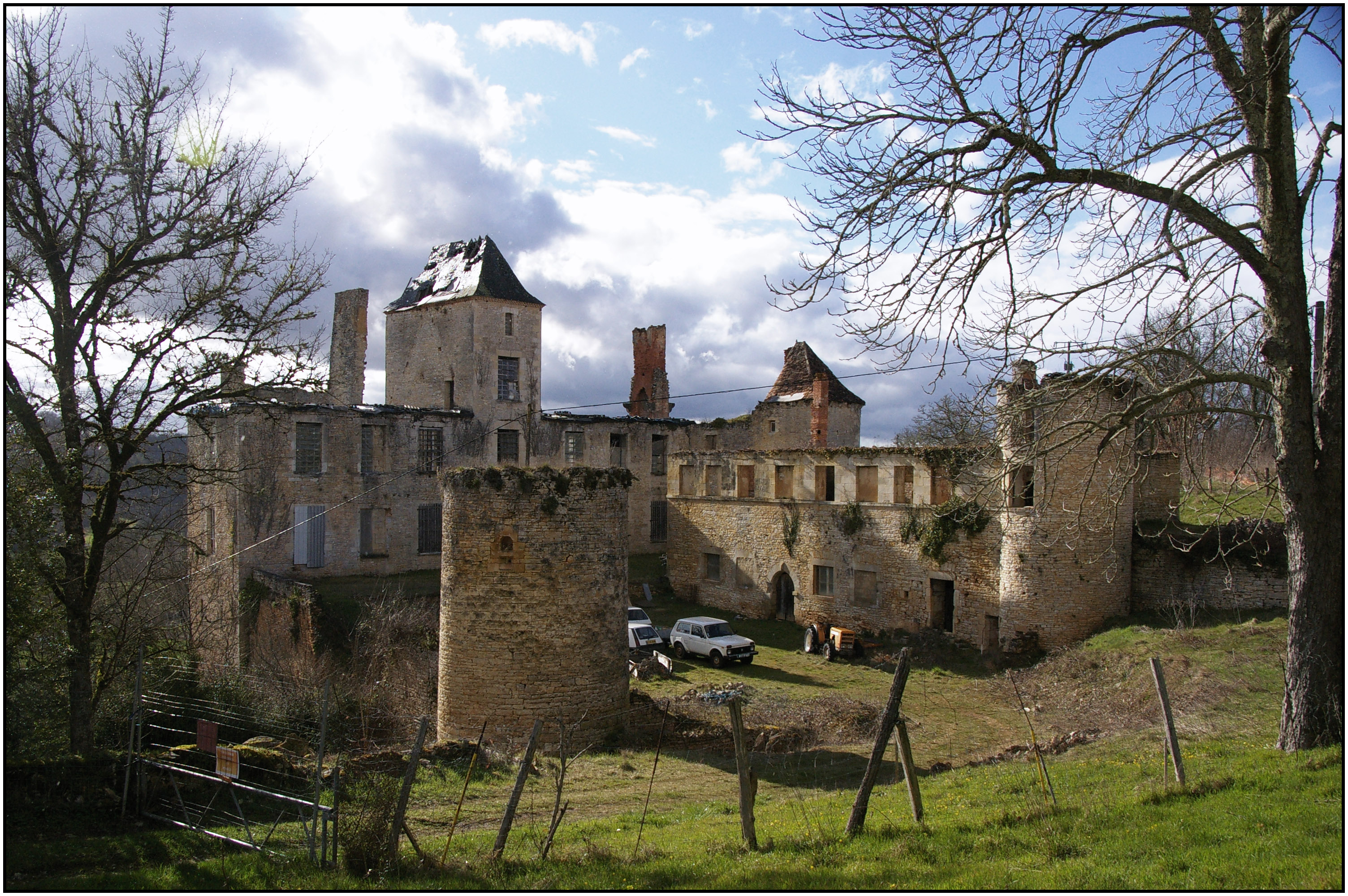
- The chateau ruins in Saint-Aubin-de-Nabirat
- Location of Saint-Aubin-de-Nabirat
- Location within France Location within Nouvelle-Aquitaine
- Coordinates: 44°43′55″N 1°17′22″E
- Country: France
- Region: Nouvelle-Aquitaine
- Department: Dordogne
- Arrondissement: Sarlat-la-Canéda
- Canton: Vallée Dordogne

Government
  - Mayor (2020–2026): Christian Garrigou
- Area^{1}: 6.49 km^{2} (2.51 sq mi)
- Elevation: 212 m (696 ft)
- Highest elevation: 230 m (750 ft)
- Lowest elevation: 125 m (410 ft)
- Population (2023): 160
  - Density: 25/km^{2} (64/sq mi)
- Time zone: UTC+01:00 (CET)
  - Summer (DST): UTC+02:00 (CEST)
- INSEE/Postal code: 24375 /24250
- ^{1} French Land Register data, which excludes lakes, ponds, glaciers > 1 km^{2} (0.386 sq mi or 247 acres) and river estuaries.

Saint-Aubin-de-Nabirat (French pronunciation: [sɛ̃.t‿obɛ̃ də nabiʁa], literally Saint-Aubin of Nabirat; Occitan: Sent Aubin de Nabirac) is a commune in the Dordogne department in Nouvelle-Aquitaine in southwestern France.

== Geography ==
The river Céou forms all of the commune's southern border.

== Population ==
Historical population
Year	Pop.	±% p.a.
1968	138	—
1975	111	−3.06%
1982	122	+1.36%
1990	124	+0.20%
1999	119	−0.46%
2007	126	+0.72%
2012	133	+1.09%
2017	143	+1.46%
2023	160	+1.89%
Source: INSEE

== See also ==
- Communes of the Dordogne department
