= Lavaur =

Lavaur is the name of several communes in France:

- Lavaur, Dordogne, in the Dordogne département
- Lavaur, Tarn, in the Tarn département
