= Saint-Cernin-de-l'Herm =

- Commune
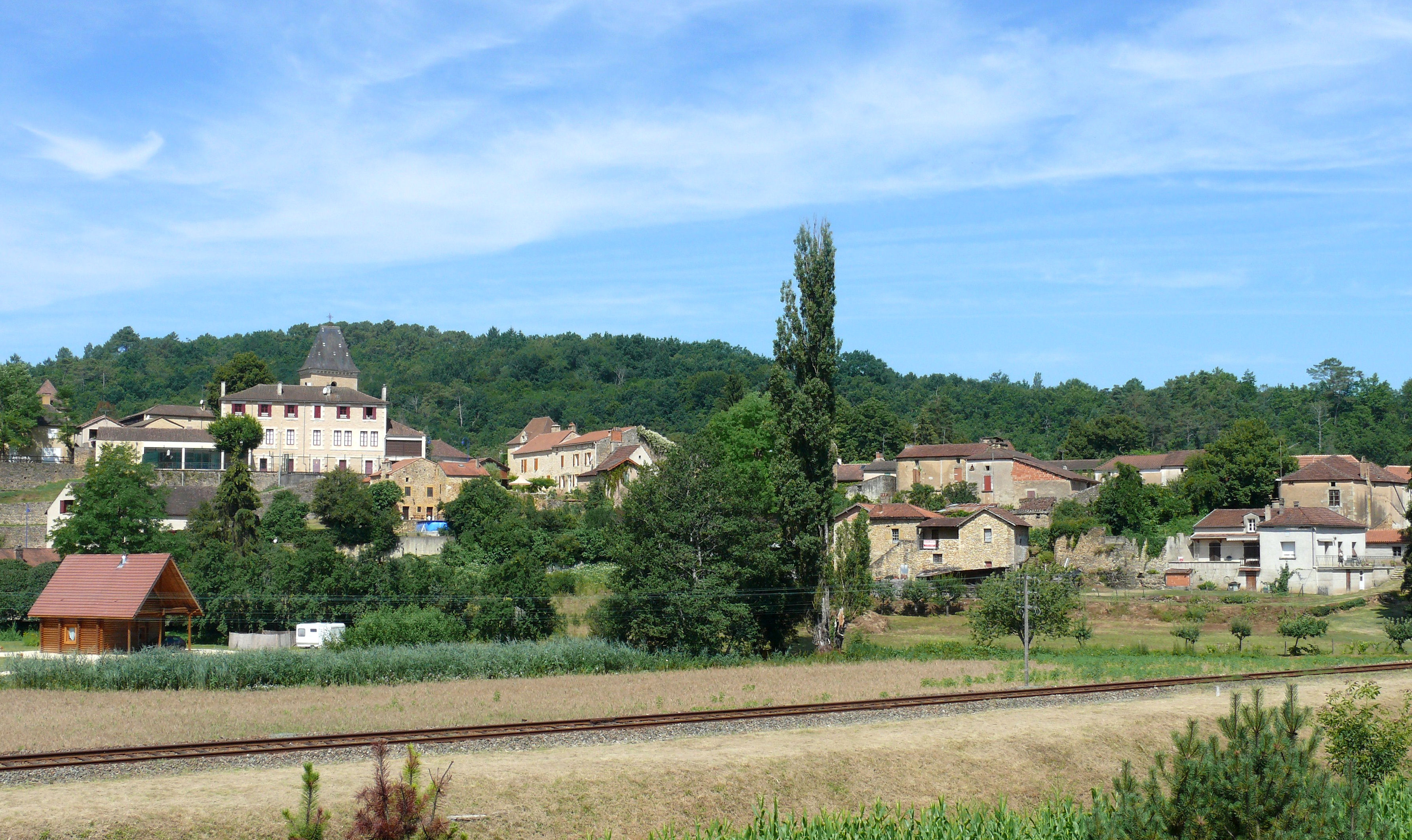
- A general view of Saint-Cernin-de-l'Herm
- Location of Saint-Cernin-de-l'Herm
- Location within France Location within Nouvelle-Aquitaine
- Coordinates: 44°38′29″N 1°02′06″E
- Country: France
- Region: Nouvelle-Aquitaine
- Department: Dordogne
- Arrondissement: Sarlat-la-Canéda
- Canton: Vallée Dordogne

Government
  - Mayor (2020–2026): Daniel Conchou
- Area^{1}: 16.25 km^{2} (6.27 sq mi)
- Elevation: 166 m (545 ft)
- Highest elevation: 306 m (1,004 ft)
- Lowest elevation: 146 m (479 ft)
- Population (2023): 193
  - Density: 11.9/km^{2} (30.8/sq mi)
- Time zone: UTC+01:00 (CET)
  - Summer (DST): UTC+02:00 (CEST)
- INSEE/Postal code: 24386 /24550
- ^{1} French Land Register data, which excludes lakes, ponds, glaciers > 1 km^{2} (0.386 sq mi or 247 acres) and river estuaries.

Saint-Cernin-de-l'Herm (French pronunciation: [sɛ̃ sɛʁnɛ̃ də lɛʁm]; Occitan: Sent Sarnin de l'Èrm) is a commune in the Dordogne department in Nouvelle-Aquitaine in southwestern France.

== Population ==
Historical population
Year	Pop.	±% p.a.
1968	305	—
1975	273	−1.57%
1982	249	−1.31%
1990	222	−1.42%
1999	230	+0.39%
2007	255	+1.30%
2012	230	−2.04%
2017	234	+0.35%
2023	193	−3.16%
Source: INSEE

== See also ==
- Communes of the Dordogne department
