= Besse, Dordogne =

Besse
- Commune
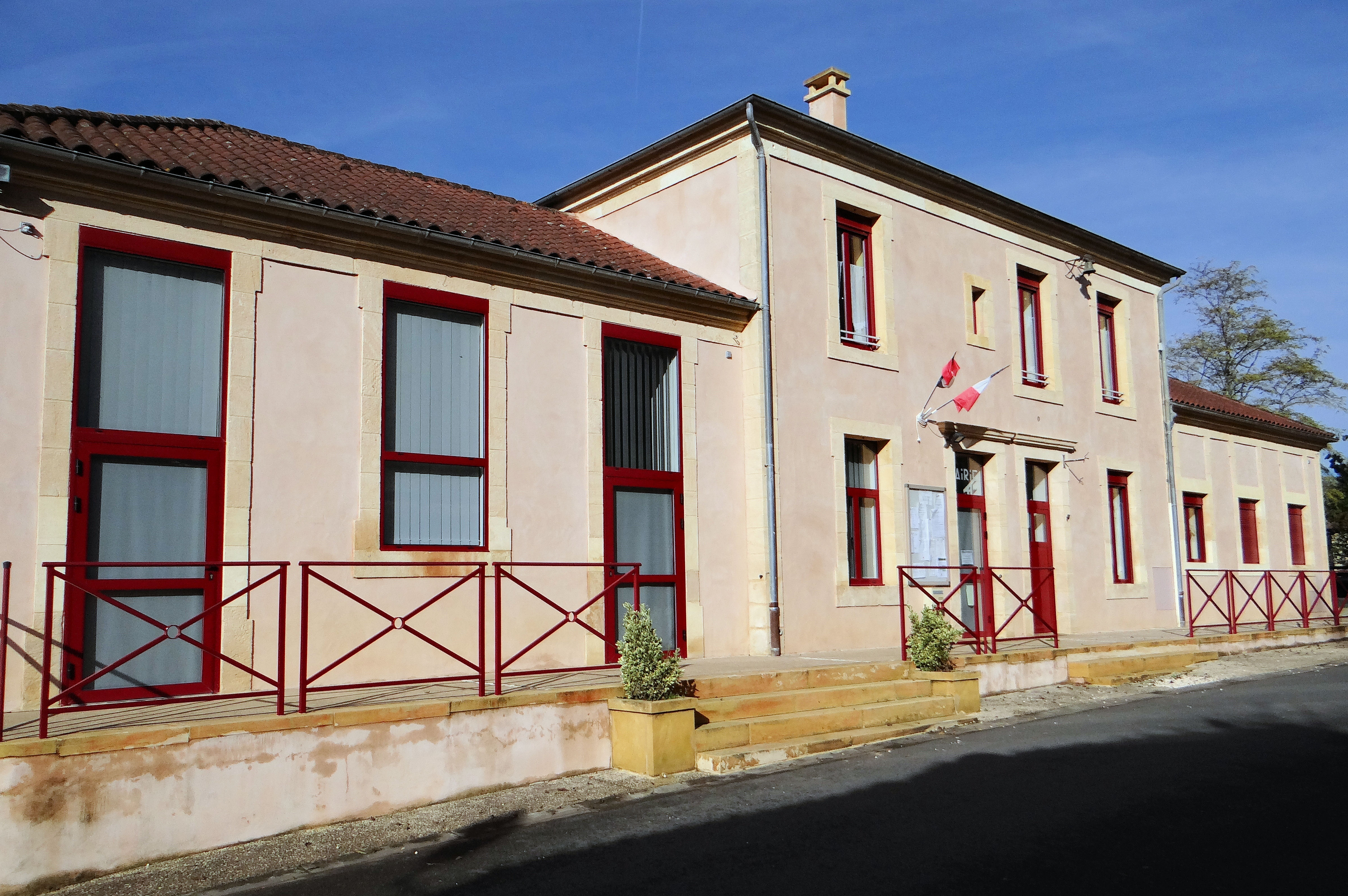
- The town hall in Besse
- Location of Besse
- Location within France Location within Nouvelle-Aquitaine
- Coordinates: 44°40′11″N 1°06′25″E
- Country: France
- Region: Nouvelle-Aquitaine
- Department: Dordogne
- Arrondissement: Sarlat-la-Canéda
- Canton: Vallée Dordogne

Government
  - Mayor (2020–2026): Francis Malvy
- Area^{1}: 16.2 km^{2} (6.3 sq mi)
- Elevation: 270 m (890 ft)
- Highest elevation: 345 m (1,132 ft)
- Lowest elevation: 170 m (560 ft)
- Population (2023): 148
  - Density: 9.14/km^{2} (23.7/sq mi)
- Time zone: UTC+01:00 (CET)
  - Summer (DST): UTC+02:00 (CEST)
- INSEE/Postal code: 24039 /24550
- ^{1} French Land Register data, which excludes lakes, ponds, glaciers > 1 km^{2} (0.386 sq mi or 247 acres) and river estuaries.

Besse (French pronunciation: [bɛs]; Occitan: Beça) is a commune in the Dordogne department in southwestern France.

== Church ==
The church of St Martin, Besse, dates from the late 11th century. It was part of a Benedictine priory, replaced by Augustines in the 13th century, and was constructed by the old château of Besse.

What remains now is the part of the nave closest to the transept, and the West façade with the porch. The rest of the nave was built during the 12th century with a guard room above. The walls are pierced with loopholes for the archers and other defensive measures during the Hundred Years' War. The English were repulsed but by 1454 church and village were in a state of abandon. The lord of the village, Raymond-Bernard de Gauléjac brought new tenants in from Quercy and Rouergue.

The church became the parish church in the 14thc. The transept and the choir date from the 15th century. In the following century, the church depended on the canonical chapter of Biron. In 1648, the church was restored with materials from the old château.

In 1961, paintings were discovered in the South transept.

The West façade and the porch

Porch

This is the most remarkable part of the church. The porch comprises two decorated Romanesque voussures ornées below an archivolt, resting on colonnettes and framed by lateral dosserets which mount to the height of the imposts. These colonnettes continue below the l'archivolt to a corniche supported by corbels forming the base of a triangular fronton decorated with lozenges.

The themes of the porch sculpture, expressing the messianic Redemption, are read from left to right:

- Isaiah, standing with a book in his hands, recoils from a vision of an angel bearing a glowing charcoal towards his lips,
- A Seraph with three pairs of wings and showing the palms of his hands
- Adam and Eve, naked, standing by the Tree of Life, hide their sex. Adam looks back to listen to Jehovah who has a halo and holds out his hand. On the left is inscribed: ADA VBI ES and on the right: XI RINVS
- Adam and Eve are clothed as a result of their sin; the serpent twined itself around the Tree of Life.
- A stag gallops before a hunter. A small person can be seen between its antlers. This illustrates the legende of Saint Eustace. This represents the Quest for God.
- Saint Michel, standing with a shield, slays the dragon.
- An angel plunges towards the person seated on a chair and seizes his hands; this is the Deliverance of Saint Peter-in-Chains.

In the centre, two angels raise a small seated man. An inscription says: (A)NGELUS DOMIN(I)...AN...S...N...EL...(P)ETRUS O...E. This refers to Saint Peter the Exorcist, os Saint Peter in Chains, of whom the Golden Legends says that when he suffered martyrdom one of the executioners saw his souls ascending to Heaven borne by two angels.

The murals in the South transept

These late 16thc paintings, discovered in 1961, were restored without the authorisation of the Department of Historic Monuments. They were probably not done with sufficient attention to the necessary minutiae, and are not all visible.

On the West wall, Christ mocked by four soldiers, a scene of martyrdom.

On the South wall, right of the window, the Arrest of Christ in the garden of Gethsemane with the Kiss of Judas. To the right, the dead Christ.

== Population ==
Historical population
Year	Pop.	±% p.a.
1968	191	—
1975	207	+1.16%
1982	183	−1.75%
1990	171	−0.84%
1999	163	−0.53%
2007	151	−0.95%
2012	156	+0.65%
2017	156	+0.00%
2023	148	−0.87%
Source: INSEE

== See also ==
- Communes of the Dordogne département

== Bibliography ==
- Jean Secret - Périgord roman - Zodiaque (collection "la nuit des temps" n°27) - La Pierre-qui-Vire - 2e édition - 1979
- Pierre Dubourg-Noves - Besse, église Saint-Martin dans Congrès archéologique de France. 137e session. Périgord Noir. 1979 - pp. 245–254 Société Française d'Archéologie - Paris - 1982
- Françoise Auricoste, La bastide de Villefranche du Périgord, capitale de la châtaigneraie (1261-1800), tome II : 1500-1800, p. 61-66, Éditions du Roc de Bourzac, Bayac, 1994 (ISBN 2-87624-058-0).
