= Saint-Pardoux-et-Vielvic =

- Commune
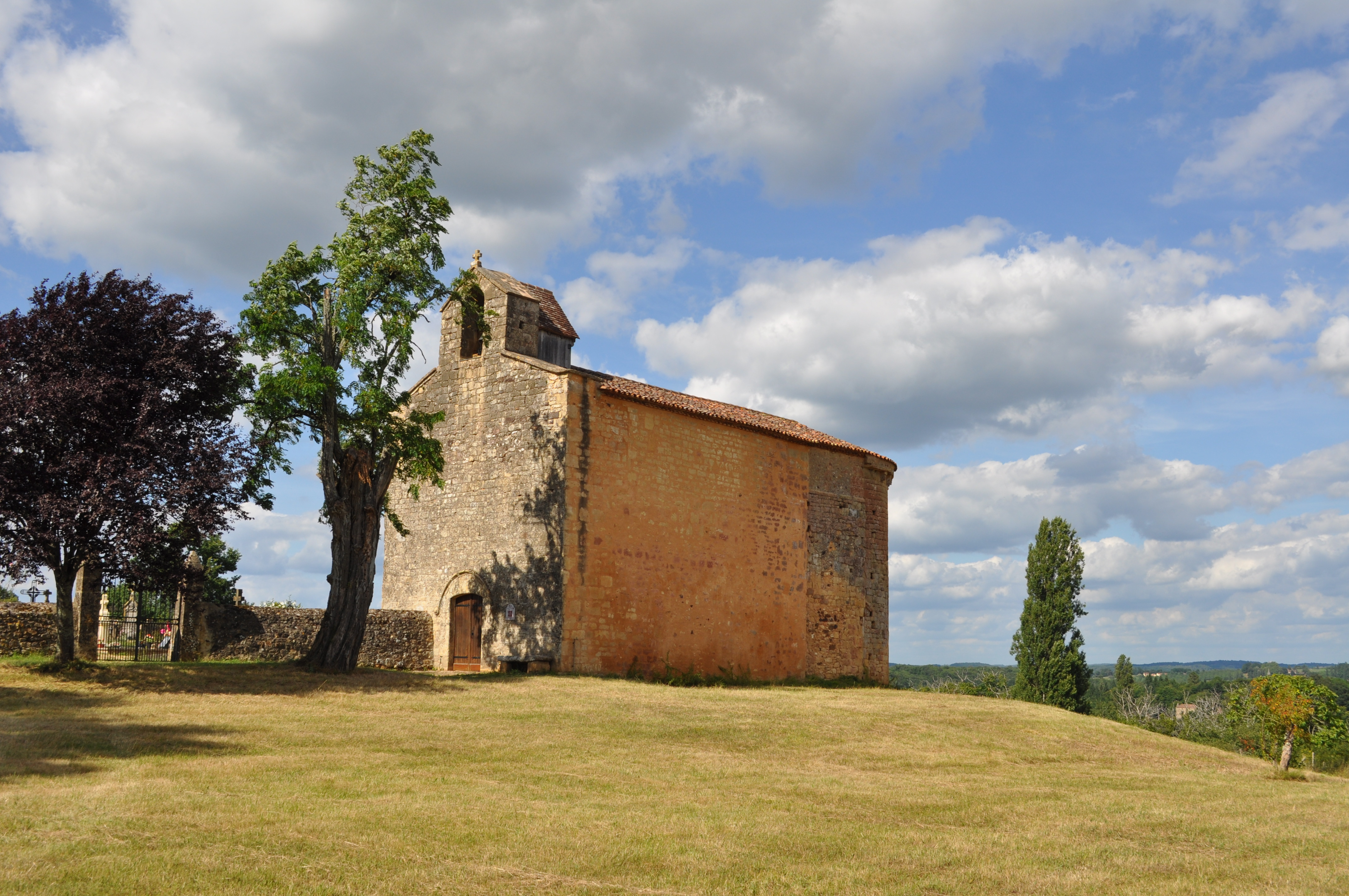
- The church of Saint Barnabé in Saint-Pardoux-et-Vielvic
- Location of Saint-Pardoux-et-Vielvic
- Location within France Location within Nouvelle-Aquitaine
- Coordinates: 44°46′11″N 0°59′11″E
- Country: France
- Region: Nouvelle-Aquitaine
- Department: Dordogne
- Arrondissement: Sarlat-la-Canéda
- Canton: Vallée Dordogne

Government
  - Mayor (2020–2026): Jean-Claude Malaurie
- Area^{1}: 14.23 km^{2} (5.49 sq mi)
- Elevation: 220 m (720 ft)
- Highest elevation: 246 m (807 ft)
- Lowest elevation: 91 m (299 ft)
- Population (2023): 188
  - Density: 13.2/km^{2} (34.2/sq mi)
- Time zone: UTC+01:00 (CET)
  - Summer (DST): UTC+02:00 (CEST)
- INSEE/Postal code: 24478 /24170
- ^{1} French Land Register data, which excludes lakes, ponds, glaciers > 1 km^{2} (0.386 sq mi or 247 acres) and river estuaries.

Saint-Pardoux-et-Vielvic (French pronunciation: [sɛ̃ paʁdu e vjɛlvik]; Languedocien: Sent Perdon e Vièlhvic or Sent Pardol e Vièlh Vic) is a commune in the Dordogne department in Nouvelle-Aquitaine in southwestern France.

== Population ==
Historical population
Year	Pop.	±% p.a.
1968	168	—
1975	140	−2.57%
1982	135	−0.52%
1990	136	+0.09%
1999	142	+0.48%
2007	184	+3.29%
2012	198	+1.48%
2017	211	+1.28%
2023	188	−1.91%
Source: INSEE

== See also ==
- Communes of the Dordogne department
