= Mazeyrolles =

- Commune
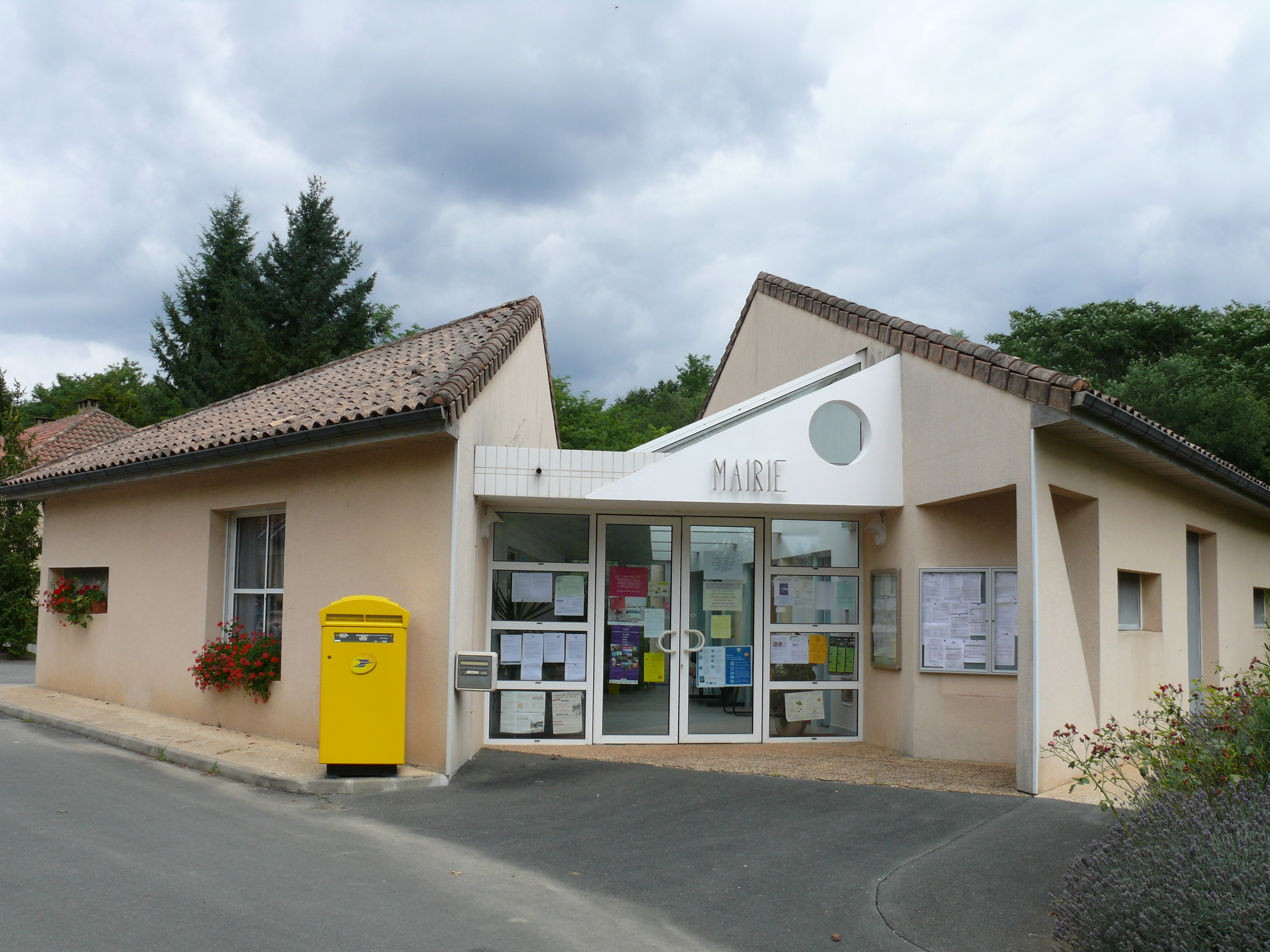
- The town hall in Mazeyrolles
- Location of Mazeyrolles
- Location within France Location within Nouvelle-Aquitaine
- Coordinates: 44°41′18″N 1°01′11″E
- Country: France
- Region: Nouvelle-Aquitaine
- Department: Dordogne
- Arrondissement: Sarlat-la-Canéda
- Canton: Vallée Dordogne

Government
  - Mayor (2021–2026): Régis Loez
- Area^{1}: 29.65 km^{2} (11.45 sq mi)
- Elevation: 211 m (692 ft)
- Highest elevation: 308 m (1,010 ft)
- Lowest elevation: 169 m (554 ft)
- Population (2023): 307
  - Density: 10.4/km^{2} (26.8/sq mi)
- Time zone: UTC+01:00 (CET)
  - Summer (DST): UTC+02:00 (CEST)
- INSEE/Postal code: 24263 /24550
- ^{1} French Land Register data, which excludes lakes, ponds, glaciers > 1 km^{2} (0.386 sq mi or 247 acres) and river estuaries.

Mazeyrolles (French pronunciation: [mazeʁɔl]; Occitan: Maseiròlas) is a commune in the Dordogne department in Nouvelle-Aquitaine in southwestern France.

== Population ==
Historical population
Year	Pop.	±% p.a.
1968	442	—
1975	389	−1.81%
1982	378	−0.41%
1990	380	+0.07%
1999	343	−1.13%
2007	359	+0.57%
2012	342	−0.97%
2017	305	−2.26%
2023	307	+0.11%
Source: INSEE

== See also ==
- Communes of the Dordogne department
