= Saint-Germain-de-Belvès =

- Commune
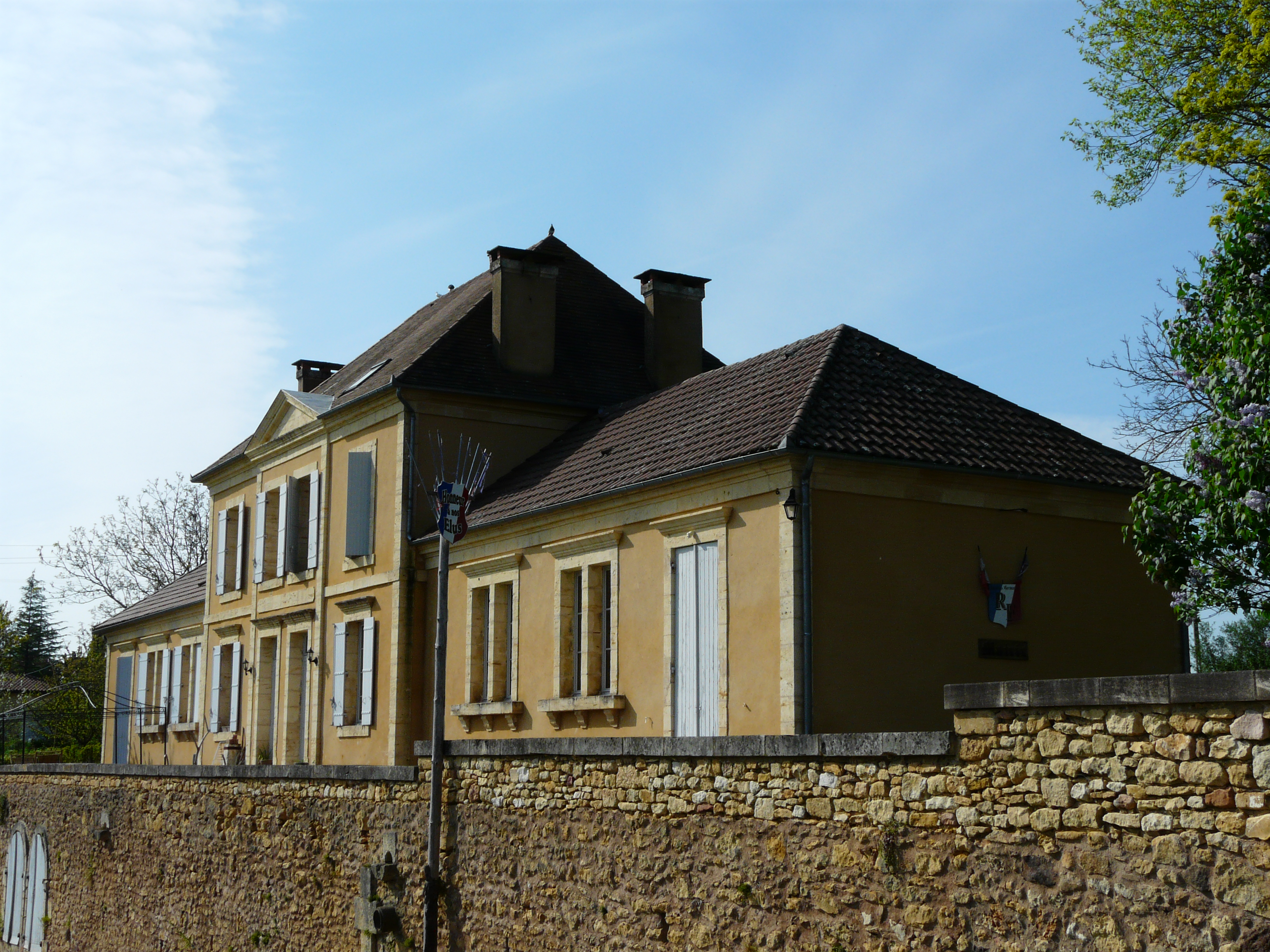
- The town hall in Saint-Germain-de-Belvès
- Location of Saint-Germain-de-Belvès
- Location within France Location within Nouvelle-Aquitaine
- Coordinates: 44°48′21″N 1°03′00″E
- Country: France
- Region: Nouvelle-Aquitaine
- Department: Dordogne
- Arrondissement: Sarlat-la-Canéda
- Canton: Vallée Dordogne

Government
  - Mayor (2020–2026): Jean-Pierre Passerieux
- Area^{1}: 7.19 km^{2} (2.78 sq mi)
- Elevation: 250 m (820 ft)
- Highest elevation: 266 m (873 ft)
- Lowest elevation: 70 m (230 ft)
- Population (2023): 180
  - Density: 25/km^{2} (65/sq mi)
- Time zone: UTC+01:00 (CET)
  - Summer (DST): UTC+02:00 (CEST)
- INSEE/Postal code: 24416 /24170
- ^{1} French Land Register data, which excludes lakes, ponds, glaciers > 1 km^{2} (0.386 sq mi or 247 acres) and river estuaries.

Saint-Germain-de-Belvès (French pronunciation: [sɛ̃ ʒɛʁmɛ̃ də bɛlvɛs], literally Saint-Germain of Belvès; Occitan: Sent German de Belvés) is a commune in the Dordogne department in Nouvelle-Aquitaine in southwestern France.

== Population ==
Historical population
| Year | Pop. | ±% p.a. |
|---|---|---|
| 1968 | 144 | — |
| 1975 | 124 | −2.11% |
| 1982 | 107 | −2.08% |
| 1990 | 108 | +0.12% |
| 1999 | 139 | +2.84% |
| 2007 | 137 | −0.18% |
| 2012 | 176 | +5.14% |
| 2017 | 176 | +0.00% |
| 2023 | 180 | +0.38% |
Source: INSEE

== See also ==
- Communes of the Dordogne department
