= Sainte-Foy-de-Belvès =

- Commune
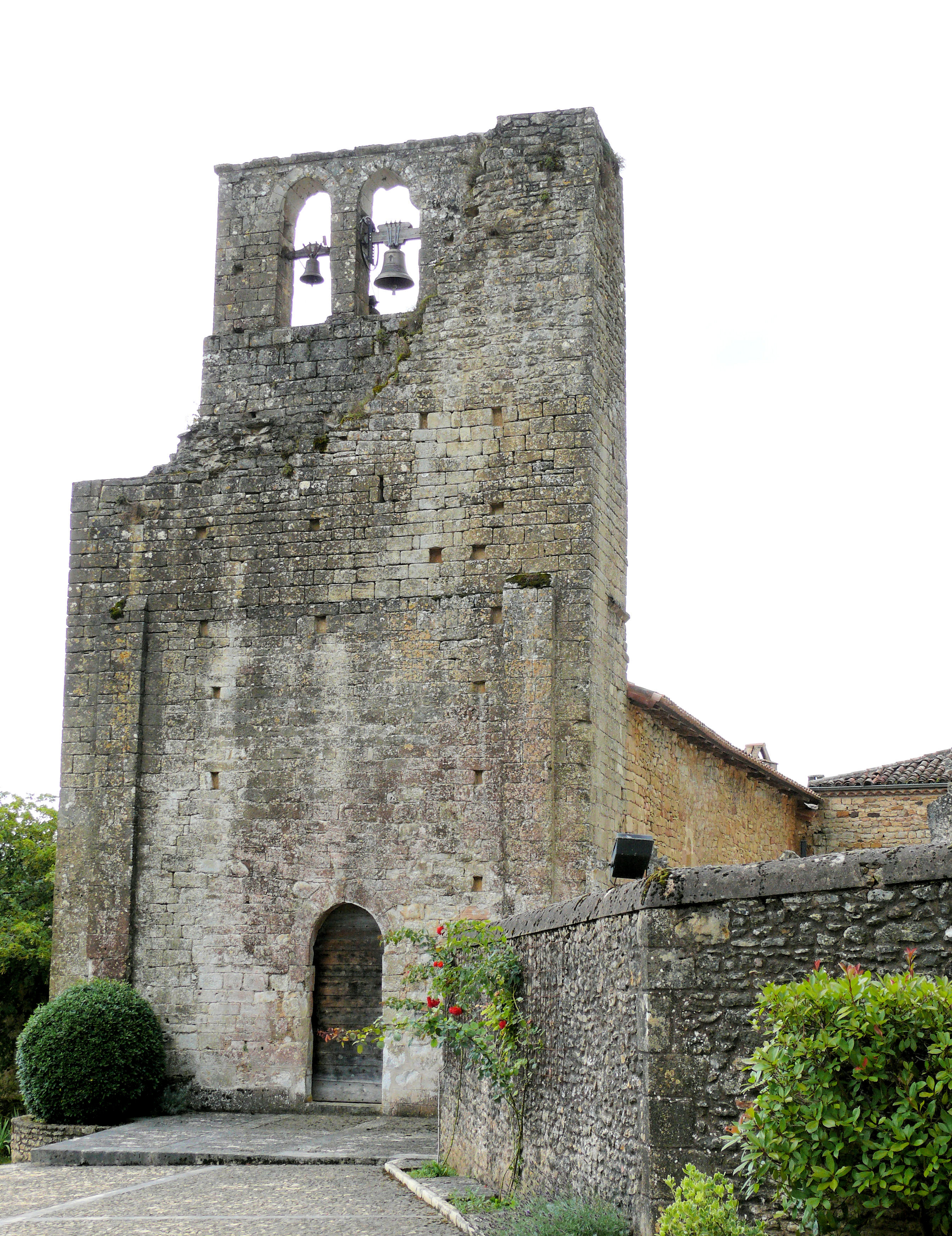
- The church in Sainte-Foy-de-Belvès
- Location of Sainte-Foy-de-Belvès
- Location within France Location within Nouvelle-Aquitaine
- Coordinates: 44°44′06″N 1°02′09″E
- Country: France
- Region: Nouvelle-Aquitaine
- Department: Dordogne
- Arrondissement: Sarlat-la-Canéda
- Canton: Vallée Dordogne

Government
  - Mayor (2020–2026): Maryse Durand
- Area^{1}: 7.41 km^{2} (2.86 sq mi)
- Elevation: 250 m (820 ft)
- Highest elevation: 304 m (997 ft)
- Lowest elevation: 111 m (364 ft)
- Population (2023): 142
  - Density: 19.2/km^{2} (49.6/sq mi)
- Time zone: UTC+01:00 (CET)
  - Summer (DST): UTC+02:00 (CEST)
- INSEE/Postal code: 24406 /24170
- ^{1} French Land Register data, which excludes lakes, ponds, glaciers > 1 km^{2} (0.386 sq mi or 247 acres) and river estuaries.

Sainte-Foy-de-Belvès (French pronunciation: [sɛ̃t fwa də bɛlvɛs], literally Sainte-Foy of Belvès; Occitan: Senta Fe de Belvés) is a commune in the Dordogne department in Nouvelle-Aquitaine in southwestern France.

== Population ==
Historical population
Year	Pop.	±% p.a.
1968	176	—
1975	154	−1.89%
1982	173	+1.68%
1990	166	−0.51%
1999	124	−3.19%
2007	128	+0.40%
2012	134	+0.92%
2017	139	+0.74%
2023	142	+0.36%
Source: INSEE

== See also ==
- Communes of the Dordogne department
