= Marnac =

- Commune
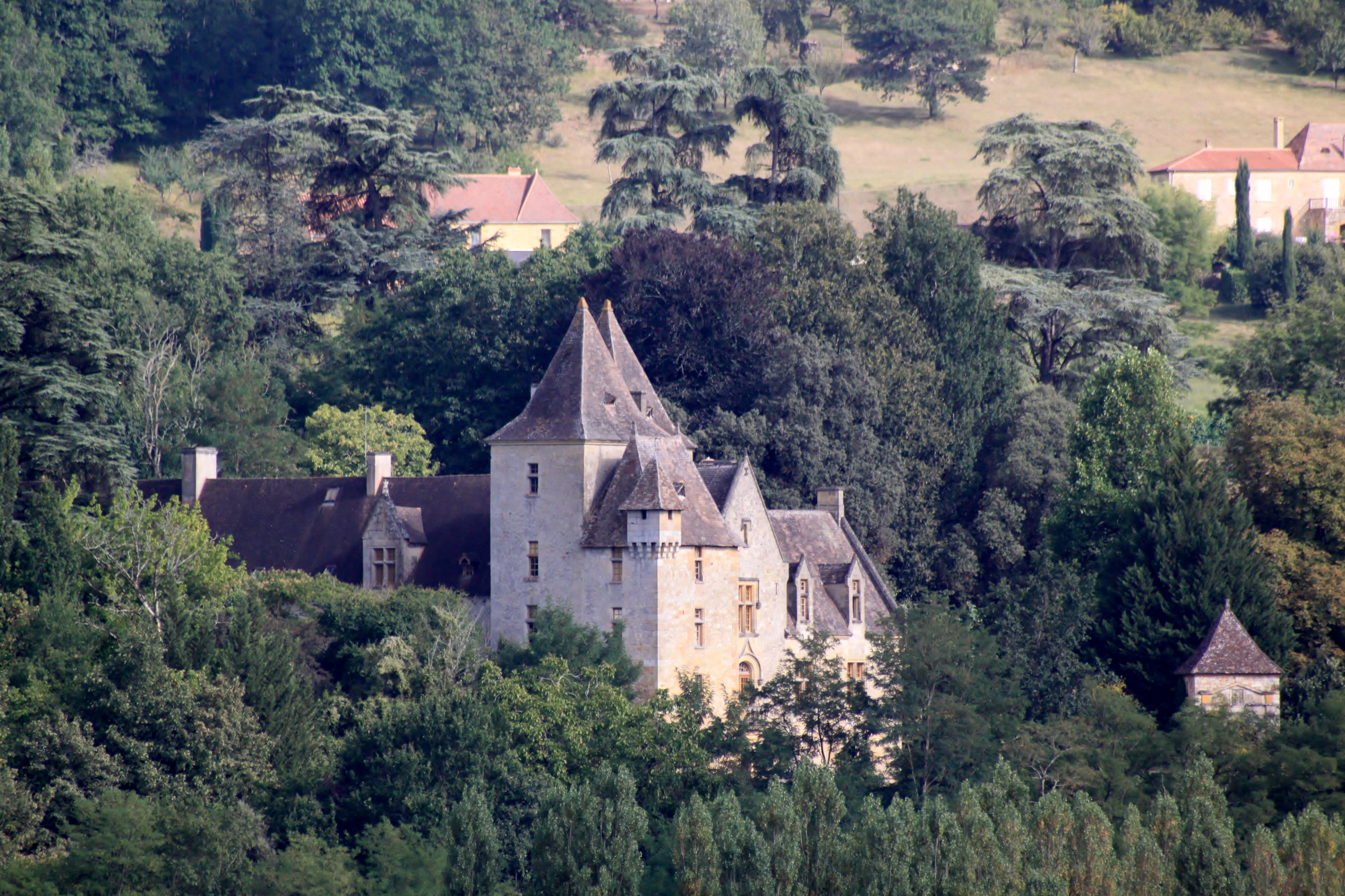
- Chateau of Betou

- Coat of arms
- Location of Marnac
- Location within France Location within Nouvelle-Aquitaine
- Coordinates: 44°50′16″N 1°01′36″E
- Country: France
- Region: Nouvelle-Aquitaine
- Department: Dordogne
- Arrondissement: Sarlat-la-Canéda
- Canton: Vallée Dordogne

Government
  - Mayor (2020–2026): Jean-Paul Mouillac
- Area^{1}: 7.92 km^{2} (3.06 sq mi)
- Elevation: 120 m (390 ft)
- Highest elevation: 260 m (850 ft)
- Lowest elevation: 50 m (160 ft)
- Population (2023): 187
  - Density: 23.6/km^{2} (61.2/sq mi)
- Time zone: UTC+01:00 (CET)
  - Summer (DST): UTC+02:00 (CEST)
- INSEE/Postal code: 24254 /24220
- ^{1} French Land Register data, which excludes lakes, ponds, glaciers > 1 km^{2} (0.386 sq mi or 247 acres) and river estuaries.

Marnac (French pronunciation: [maʁnak]) is a commune in the Dordogne department in Nouvelle-Aquitaine in southwestern France.

== Population ==
Historical population
Year	Pop.	±% p.a.
1968	196	—
1975	161	−2.77%
1982	175	+1.20%
1990	185	+0.70%
1999	192	+0.41%
2007	193	+0.06%
2012	187	−0.63%
2017	188	+0.11%
2023	187	−0.09%
Source: INSEE

== See also ==
- Communes of the Dordogne department
