= Grives =

- Commune
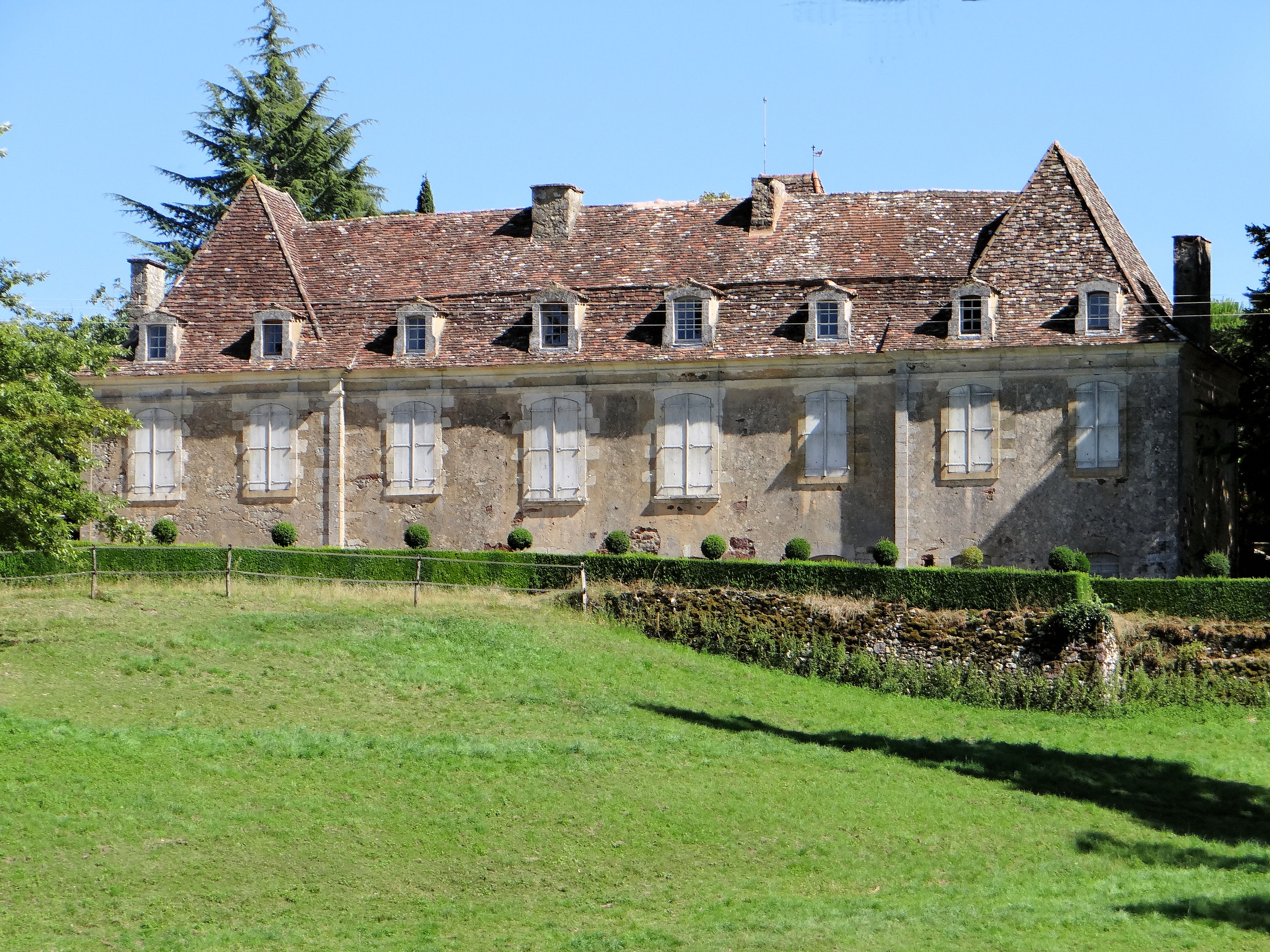
- Chartreuse du Breuil
- Location of Grives
- Location within France Location within Nouvelle-Aquitaine
- Coordinates: 44°45′59″N 1°04′39″E
- Country: France
- Region: Nouvelle-Aquitaine
- Department: Dordogne
- Arrondissement: Sarlat-la-Canéda
- Canton: Vallée Dordogne

Government
  - Mayor (2020–2026): Sébastien Fongauffier
- Area^{1}: 8.12 km^{2} (3.14 sq mi)
- Elevation: 148 m (486 ft)
- Highest elevation: 287 m (942 ft)
- Lowest elevation: 132 m (433 ft)
- Population (2023): 106
  - Density: 13.1/km^{2} (33.8/sq mi)
- Time zone: UTC+01:00 (CET)
  - Summer (DST): UTC+02:00 (CEST)
- INSEE/Postal code: 24206 /24170
- ^{1} French Land Register data, which excludes lakes, ponds, glaciers > 1 km^{2} (0.386 sq mi or 247 acres) and river estuaries.

Grives (French pronunciation: [ɡʁiv]; Occitan: Grivas) is a commune in the Dordogne department in Nouvelle-Aquitaine in southwestern France.

== Population ==
Historical population
Year	Pop.	±% p.a.
1968	183	—
1975	144	−3.37%
1982	128	−1.67%
1990	129	+0.10%
1999	135	+0.51%
2007	122	−1.26%
2012	127	+0.81%
2017	120	−1.13%
2023	106	−2.05%
Source: INSEE

== See also ==
- Communes of the Dordogne department
