= Salles-de-Belvès =

- Commune
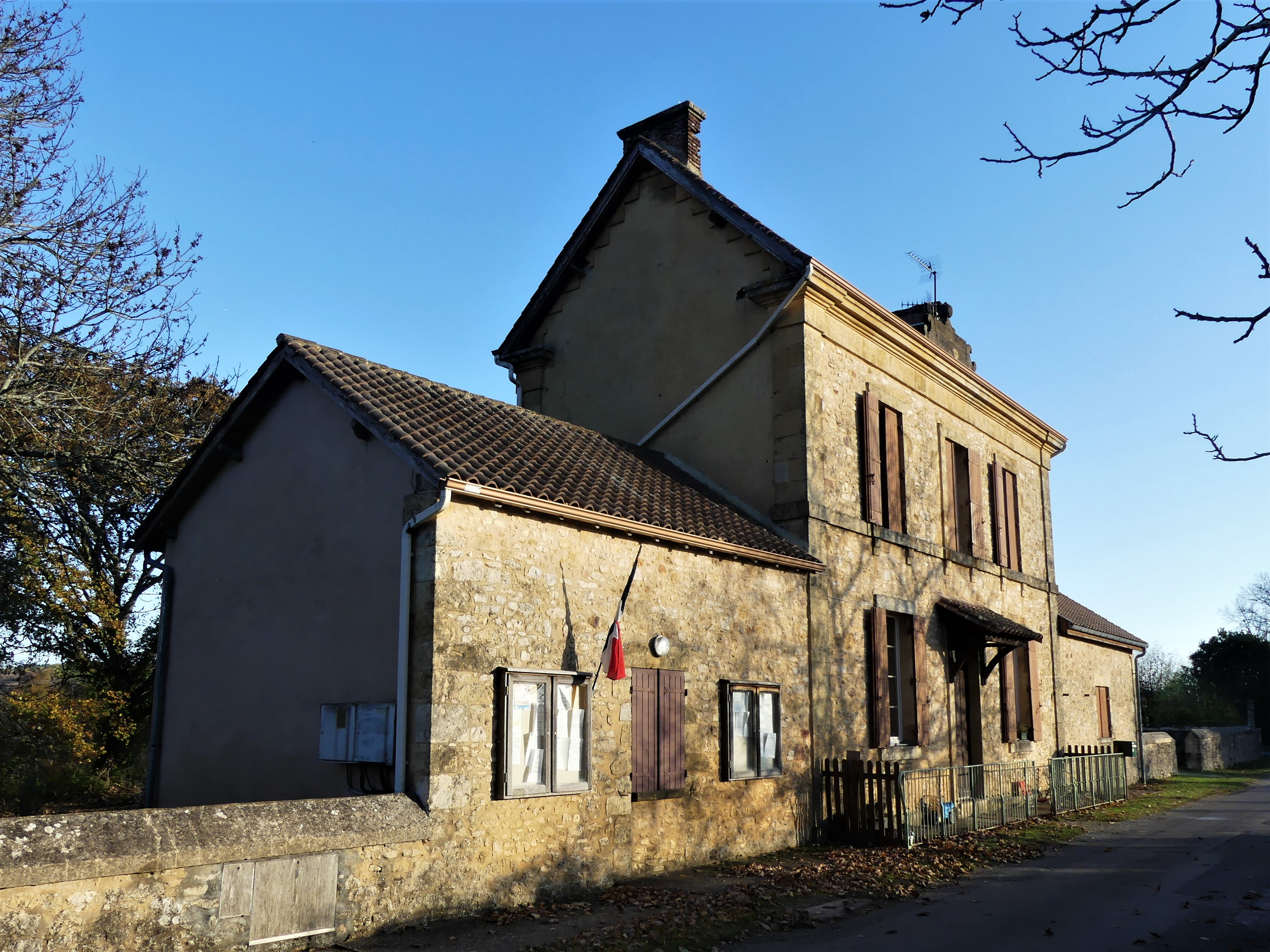
- The town hall in Salles-de-Belvès
- Location of Salles-de-Belvès
- Location within France Location within Nouvelle-Aquitaine
- Coordinates: 44°42′41″N 1°00′00″E
- Country: France
- Region: Nouvelle-Aquitaine
- Department: Dordogne
- Arrondissement: Sarlat-la-Canéda
- Canton: Vallée Dordogne

Government
  - Mayor (2020–2026): Georges Dejonghe
- Area^{1}: 8.76 km^{2} (3.38 sq mi)
- Elevation: 227 m (745 ft)
- Highest elevation: 297 m (974 ft)
- Lowest elevation: 132 m (433 ft)
- Population (2023): 78
  - Density: 8.9/km^{2} (23/sq mi)
- Time zone: UTC+01:00 (CET)
  - Summer (DST): UTC+02:00 (CEST)
- INSEE/Postal code: 24517 /24170
- ^{1} French Land Register data, which excludes lakes, ponds, glaciers > 1 km^{2} (0.386 sq mi or 247 acres) and river estuaries.

Salles-de-Belvès (French pronunciation: [sal də bɛlvɛs], literally Salles of Belvès; Occitan: Salas de Belvés) is a commune in the Dordogne department in Nouvelle-Aquitaine in southwestern France.

== Population ==
Historical population
Year	Pop.	±% p.a.
1968	74	—
1975	77	+0.57%
1982	84	+1.25%
1990	68	−2.61%
1999	54	−2.53%
2007	67	+2.73%
2012	78	+3.09%
2017	71	−1.86%
2023	78	+1.58%
Source: INSEE

== See also ==
- Communes of the Dordogne department
