= Prats-du-Périgord =

- Commune
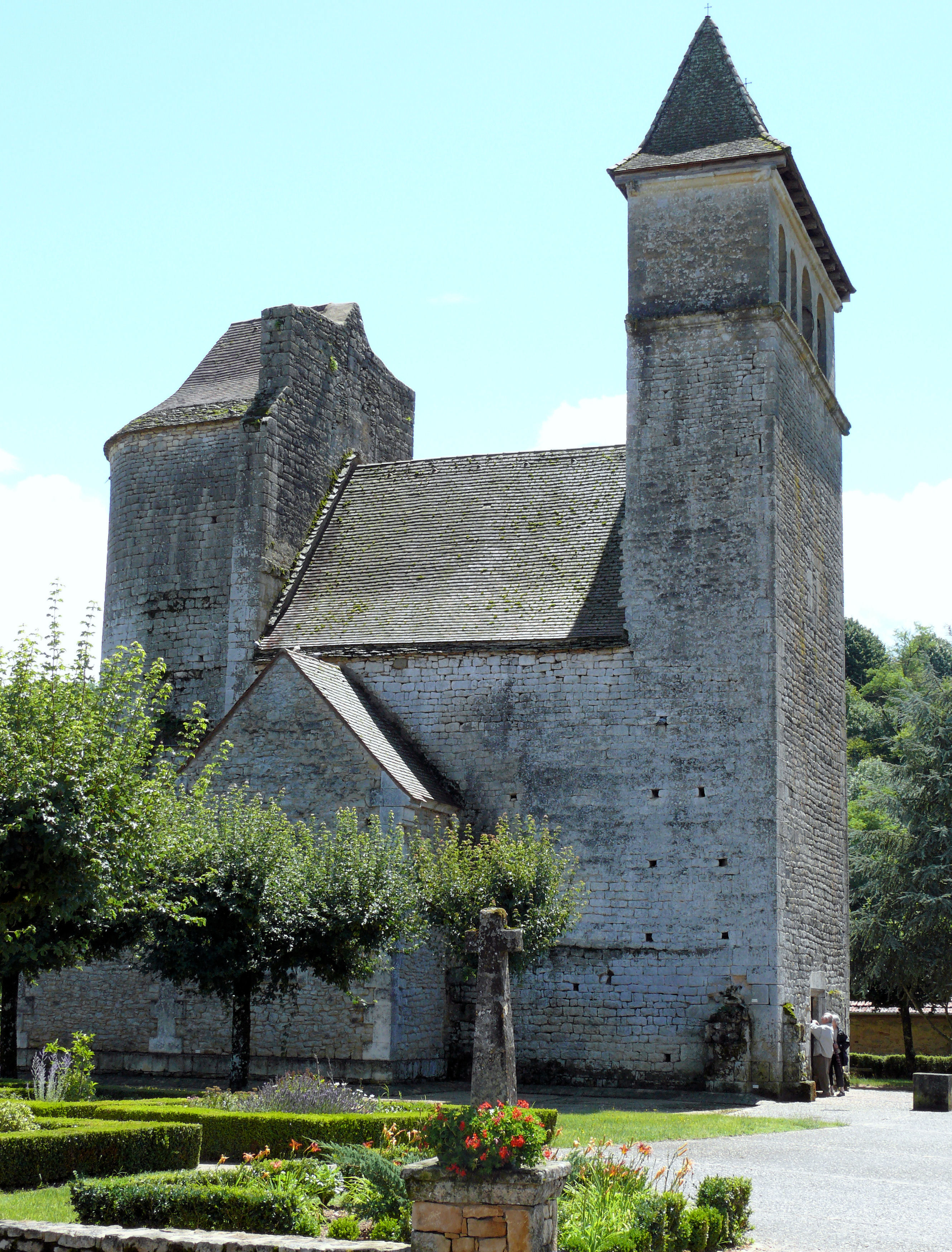
- The church in Prats-du-Périgord
- Location of Prats-du-Périgord
- Location within France Location within Nouvelle-Aquitaine
- Coordinates: 44°41′34″N 1°04′05″E
- Country: France
- Region: Nouvelle-Aquitaine
- Department: Dordogne
- Arrondissement: Sarlat-la-Canéda
- Canton: Vallée Dordogne

Government
  - Mayor (2020–2026): Christian Eymery
- Area^{1}: 10.99 km^{2} (4.24 sq mi)
- Elevation: 210 m (690 ft)
- Highest elevation: 305 m (1,001 ft)
- Lowest elevation: 178 m (584 ft)
- Population (2023): 143
  - Density: 13.0/km^{2} (33.7/sq mi)
- Time zone: UTC+01:00 (CET)
  - Summer (DST): UTC+02:00 (CEST)
- INSEE/Postal code: 24337 /24550
- ^{1} French Land Register data, which excludes lakes, ponds, glaciers > 1 km^{2} (0.386 sq mi or 247 acres) and river estuaries.

Prats-du-Périgord (French pronunciation: [pʁa dy peʁiɡɔʁ]; Occitan: Prats de Perigòrd) is a commune in the Dordogne department in Nouvelle-Aquitaine in southwest France.

== Population ==
Historical population
Year	Pop.	±% p.a.
1968	238	—
1975	197	−2.66%
1982	212	+1.05%
1990	199	−0.79%
1999	183	−0.93%
2007	166	−1.21%
2012	151	−1.88%
2017	147	−0.54%
2023	143	−0.46%
Source: INSEE

== Local culture and heritage ==
=== Places and monuments ===
==== Église Saint-Maurice de Prats-du-Périgord ====
The main part of the church was built in 12th and 13th centuries as part of a commandery of the Knights Hospitaller order. The entrance is a through a tall flat bell-tower with four bell openings into the church's nave. The chevet-apse is extremely high and is fortified with murder holes or meurtrière. The church is the property of the municipality and was registered as a historical monument on 24 June 1948.

== See also ==
- Communes of the Dordogne department
