= Orliac =

- Commune
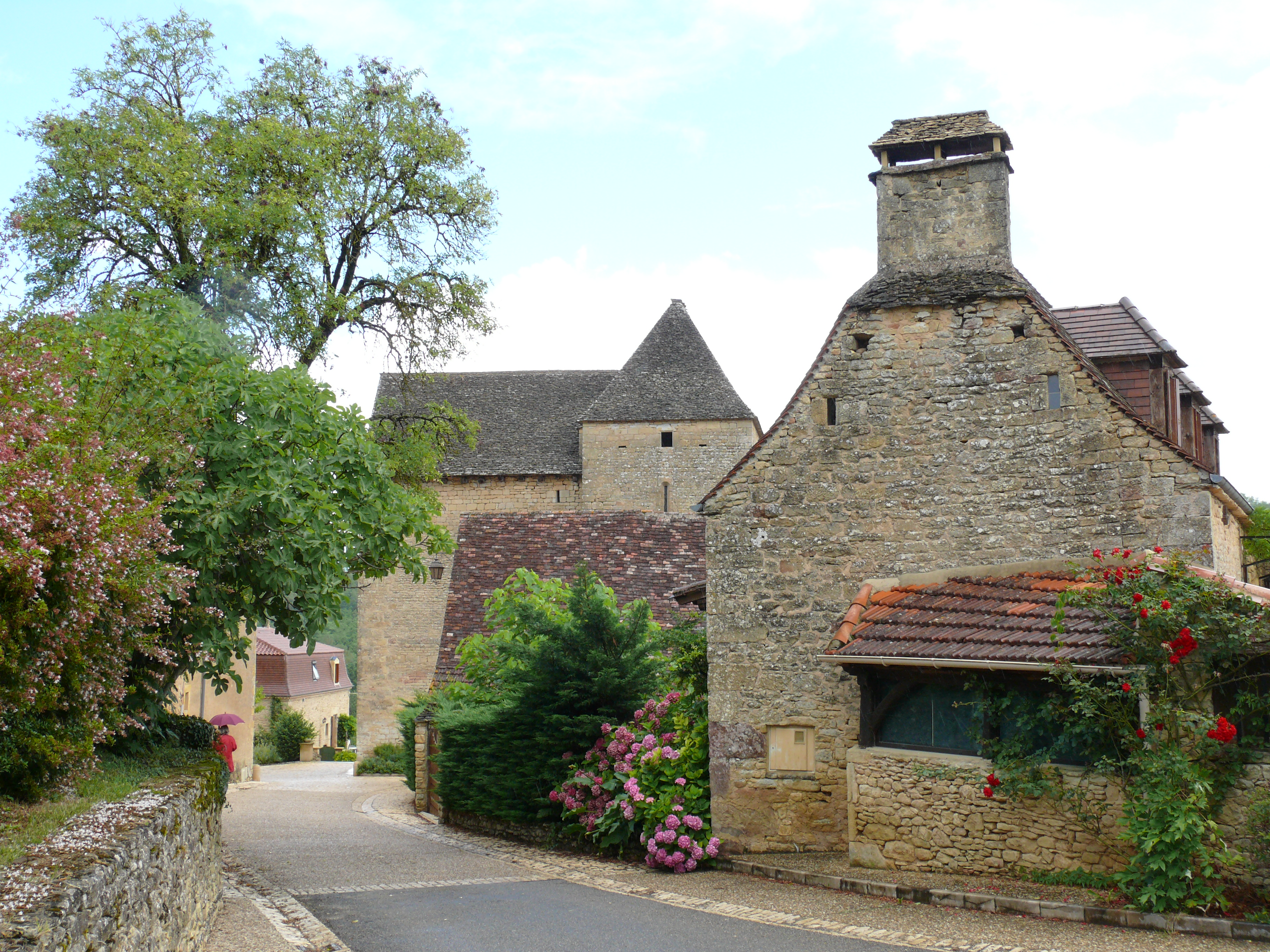
- A general view of Orliac
- Location of Orliac
- Location within France Location within Nouvelle-Aquitaine
- Coordinates: 44°43′01″N 1°04′08″E
- Country: France
- Region: Nouvelle-Aquitaine
- Department: Dordogne
- Arrondissement: Sarlat-la-Canéda
- Canton: Vallée Dordogne
- Intercommunality: Domme-Villefranche du Périgord

Government
  - Mayor (2020–2026): Christian Ventelou
- Area^{1}: 10.54 km^{2} (4.07 sq mi)
- Elevation: 224 m (735 ft)
- Highest elevation: 305 m (1,001 ft)
- Lowest elevation: 139 m (456 ft)
- Population (2023): 43
  - Density: 4.1/km^{2} (11/sq mi)
- Time zone: UTC+01:00 (CET)
  - Summer (DST): UTC+02:00 (CEST)
- INSEE/Postal code: 24313 /24170
- ^{1} French Land Register data, which excludes lakes, ponds, glaciers > 1 km^{2} (0.386 sq mi or 247 acres) and river estuaries.

Orliac (French pronunciation: [ɔʁljak]; Occitan: Orlhac) is a commune in the Dordogne department in Nouvelle-Aquitaine in southwestern France.

== Population ==
Historical population
Year	Pop.	±% p.a.
1968	73	—
1975	87	+2.54%
1982	77	−1.73%
1990	72	−0.84%
1999	51	−3.76%
2007	50	−0.25%
2012	60	+3.71%
2017	60	+0.00%
2023	43	−5.40%
Source: INSEE

== See also ==
- Communes of the Dordogne department
