= Campagnac-lès-Quercy =

- Commune
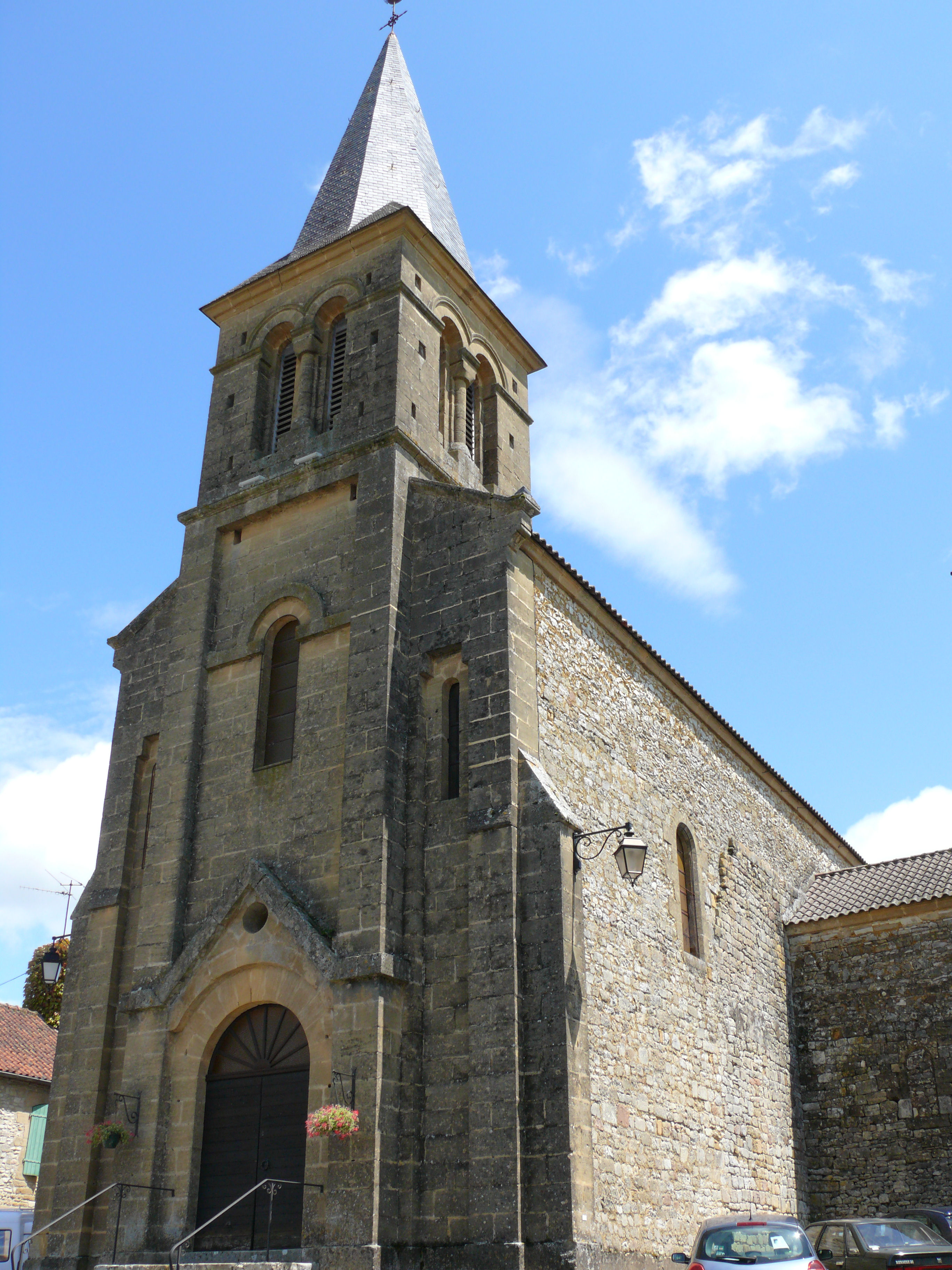
- The church in Campagnac-lès-Quercy

- Coat of arms
- Location of Campagnac-lès-Quercy
- Location within France Location within Nouvelle-Aquitaine
- Coordinates: 44°41′44″N 1°10′27″E
- Country: France
- Region: Nouvelle-Aquitaine
- Department: Dordogne
- Arrondissement: Sarlat-la-Canéda
- Canton: Vallée Dordogne

Government
  - Mayor (2020–2026): Daniel Maury
- Area^{1}: 19.67 km^{2} (7.59 sq mi)
- Elevation: 290 m (950 ft)
- Highest elevation: 345 m (1,132 ft)
- Lowest elevation: 135 m (443 ft)
- Population (2023): 323
  - Density: 16.4/km^{2} (42.5/sq mi)
- Time zone: UTC+01:00 (CET)
  - Summer (DST): UTC+02:00 (CEST)
- INSEE/Postal code: 24075 /24550
- ^{1} French Land Register data, which excludes lakes, ponds, glaciers > 1 km^{2} (0.386 sq mi or 247 acres) and river estuaries.

Campagnac-lès-Quercy (French pronunciation: [kɑ̃paɲak lɛ kɛʁsi], literally Campagnac near Quercy; Occitan: Campanhac prèp Carcin) is a commune in the southern Dordogne department in Nouvelle-Aquitaine in southwestern France. It is located about 30 km south of Sarlat-la-Canéda, close to the border with Lot-et-Garonne.

== Population ==
Historical population
Year	Pop.	±% p.a.
1968	395	—
1975	350	−1.71%
1982	316	−1.45%
1990	305	−0.44%
1999	293	−0.44%
2007	309	+0.67%
2012	296	−0.86%
2017	304	+0.53%
2023	323	+1.02%
Source: INSEE

== See also ==
- Communes of the Dordogne department
