= Sagelat =

- Commune
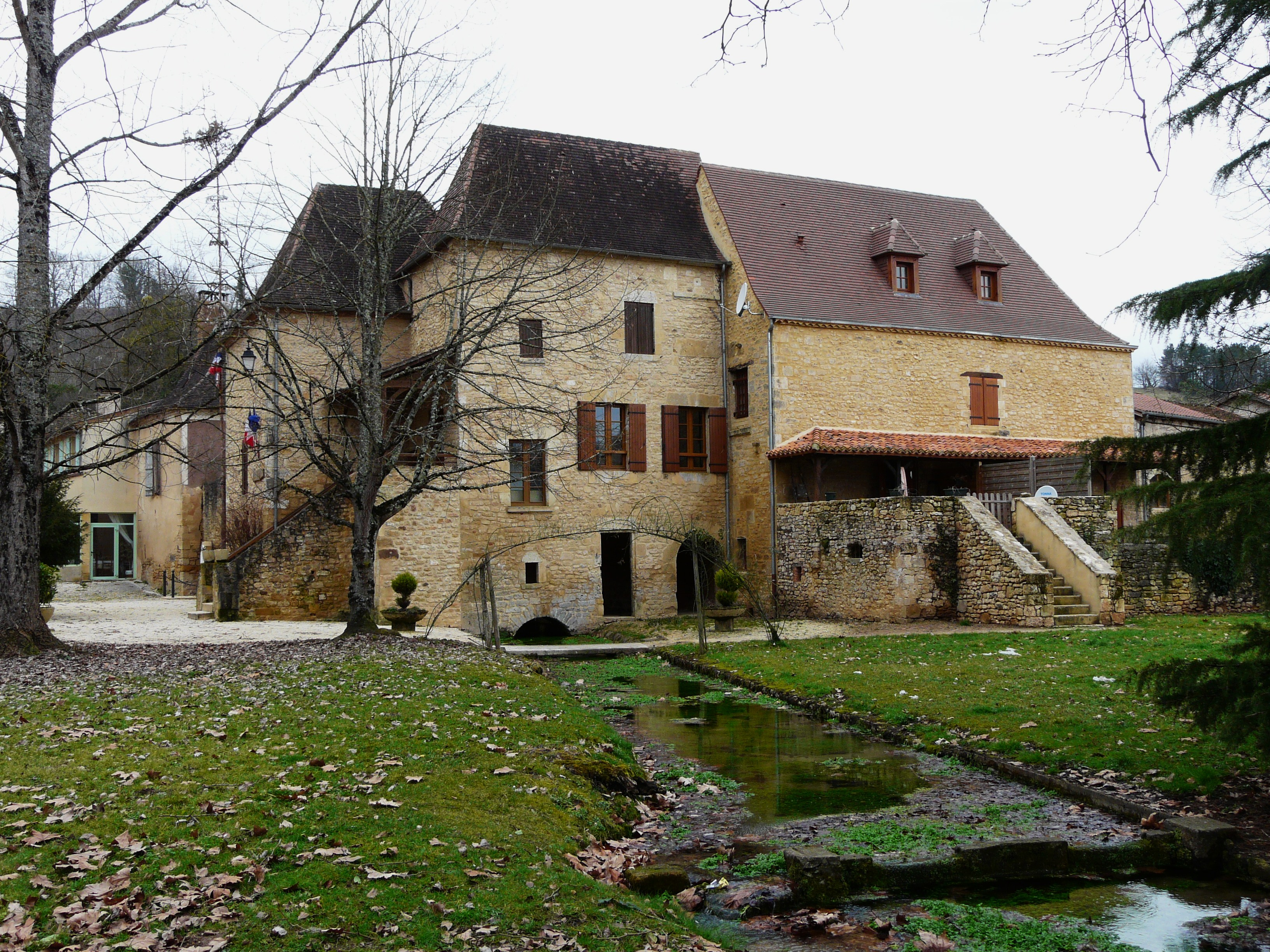
- Town hall

- Coat of arms
- Location of Sagelat
- Location within France Location within Nouvelle-Aquitaine
- Coordinates: 44°47′18″N 1°00′46″E
- Country: France
- Region: Nouvelle-Aquitaine
- Department: Dordogne
- Arrondissement: Sarlat-la-Canéda
- Canton: Vallée Dordogne

Government
  - Mayor (2020–2026): Olivier Merlhiot
- Area^{1}: 7.57 km^{2} (2.92 sq mi)
- Elevation: 120 m (390 ft)
- Highest elevation: 219 m (719 ft)
- Lowest elevation: 65 m (213 ft)
- Population (2023): 318
  - Density: 42.0/km^{2} (109/sq mi)
- Time zone: UTC+01:00 (CET)
  - Summer (DST): UTC+02:00 (CEST)
- INSEE/Postal code: 24360 /24170
- ^{1} French Land Register data, which excludes lakes, ponds, glaciers > 1 km^{2} (0.386 sq mi or 247 acres) and river estuaries.

Sagelat (French pronunciation: [saʒla]) is a commune in the Dordogne department in Nouvelle-Aquitaine in southwestern France.

== Population ==
Historical population
Year	Pop.	±% p.a.
1968	261	—
1975	253	−0.44%
1982	302	+2.56%
1990	300	−0.08%
1999	325	+0.89%
2007	352	+1.00%
2012	330	−1.28%
2017	313	−1.05%
2023	318	+0.26%
Source: INSEE

== See also ==
- Communes of the Dordogne department
