= Larzac, Dordogne =

Larzac
- Commune
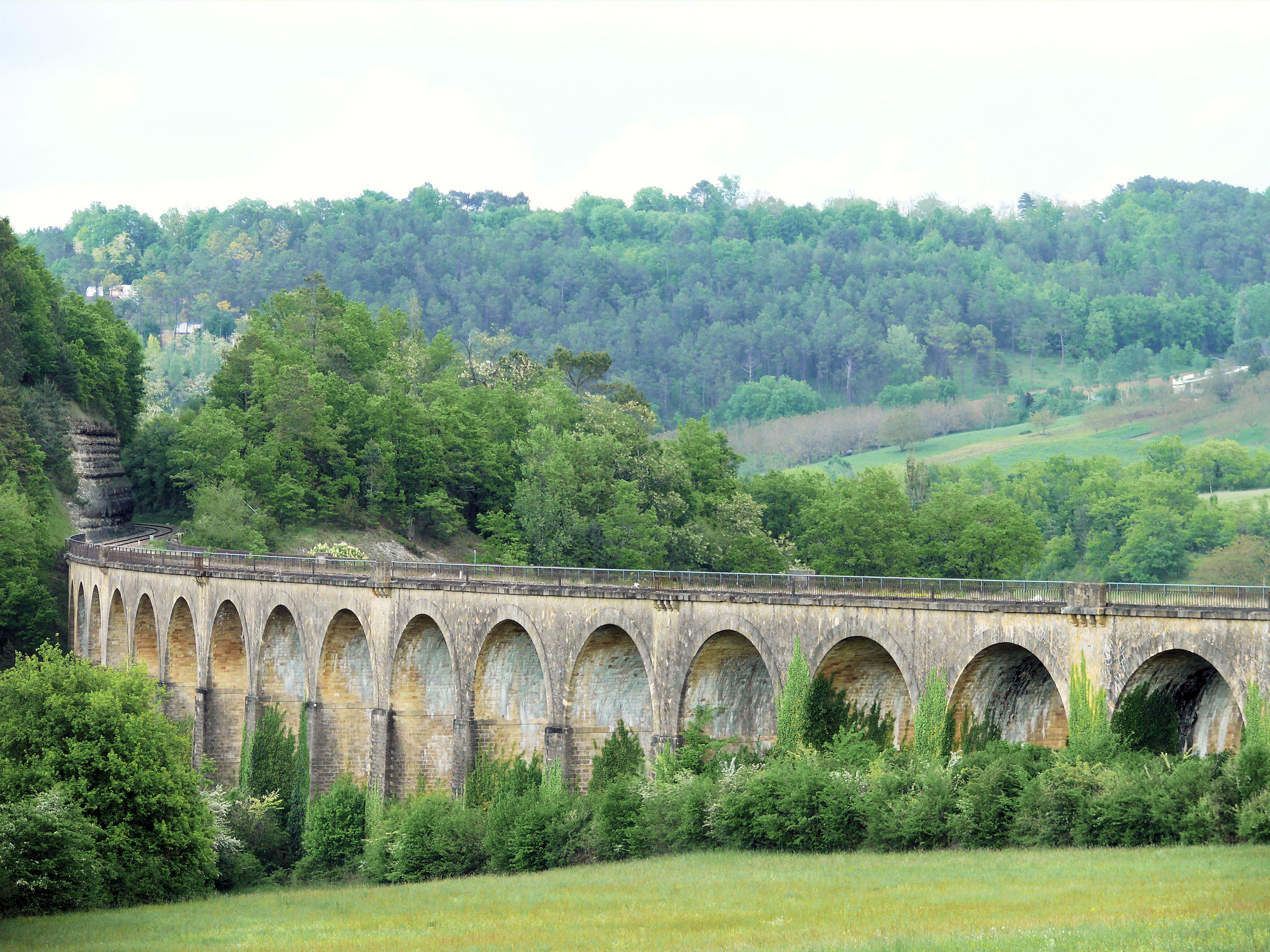
- Railroad viaduct
- Location of Larzac
- Location within France Location within Nouvelle-Aquitaine
- Coordinates: 44°44′54″N 1°00′31″E
- Country: France
- Region: Nouvelle-Aquitaine
- Department: Dordogne
- Arrondissement: Sarlat-la-Canéda
- Canton: Vallée Dordogne

Government
  - Mayor (2020–2026): Serge Orhand
- Area^{1}: 6.78 km^{2} (2.62 sq mi)
- Elevation: 140 m (460 ft)
- Highest elevation: 245 m (804 ft)
- Lowest elevation: 103 m (338 ft)
- Population (2023): 145
  - Density: 21.4/km^{2} (55.4/sq mi)
- Time zone: UTC+01:00 (CET)
  - Summer (DST): UTC+02:00 (CEST)
- INSEE/Postal code: 24230 /24170
- ^{1} French Land Register data, which excludes lakes, ponds, glaciers > 1 km^{2} (0.386 sq mi or 247 acres) and river estuaries.

Larzac (French pronunciation: [laʁzak]) is a commune in the Dordogne department in Nouvelle-Aquitaine in southwestern France.

== Population ==
Historical population
Year	Pop.	±% p.a.
1968	105	—
1975	106	+0.14%
1982	117	+1.42%
1990	105	−1.34%
1999	115	+1.02%
2007	137	+2.21%
2012	135	−0.29%
2017	144	+1.30%
2023	145	+0.12%
Source: INSEE

== See also ==
- Communes of the Dordogne department
