= Cladech =

- Commune
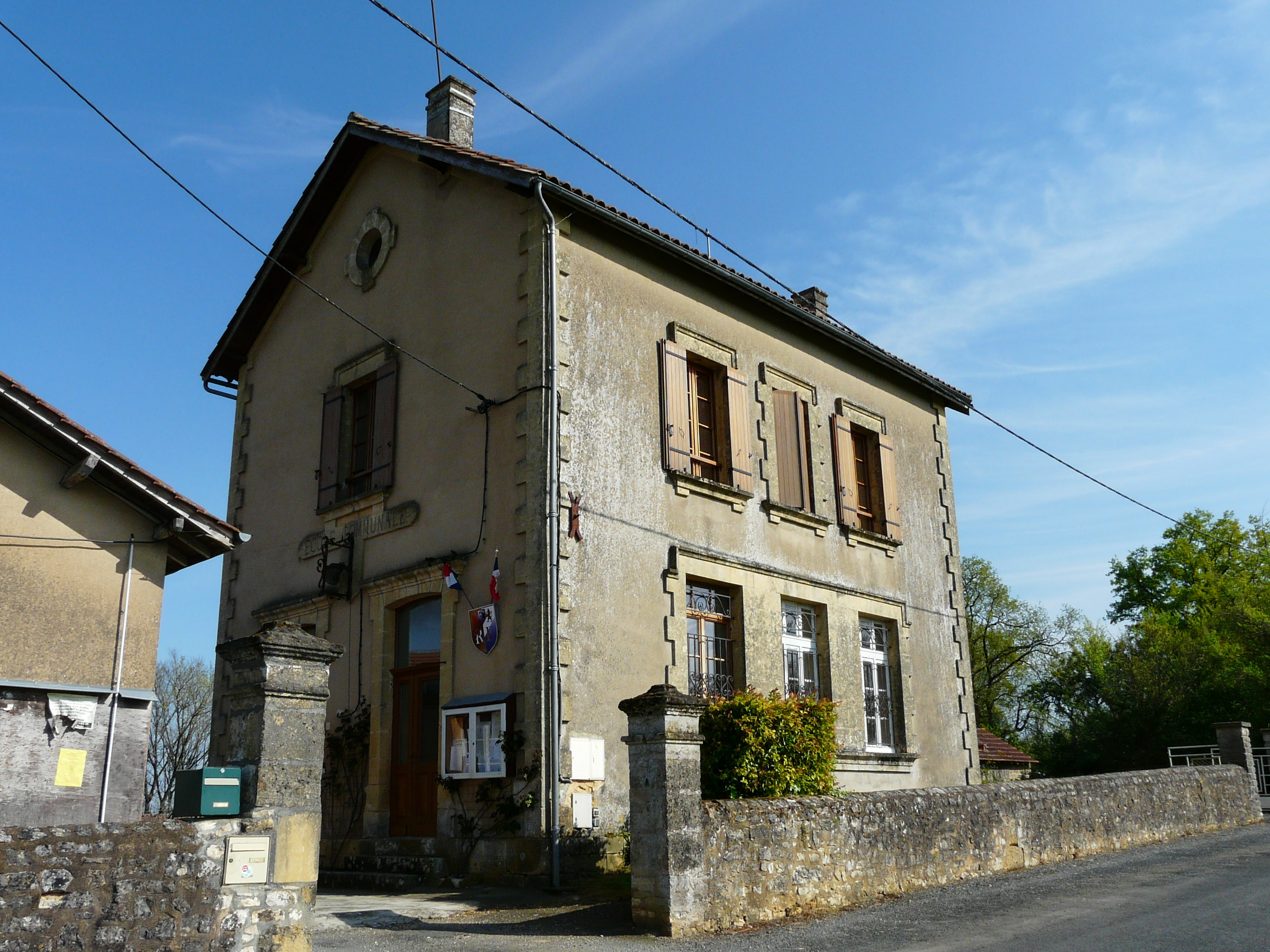
- The town hall in Cladech
- Location of Cladech
- Location within France Location within Nouvelle-Aquitaine
- Coordinates: 44°48′59″N 1°04′21″E
- Country: France
- Region: Nouvelle-Aquitaine
- Department: Dordogne
- Arrondissement: Sarlat-la-Canéda
- Canton: Vallée Dordogne

Government
  - Mayor (2020–2026): Jean-Pierre Andre
- Area^{1}: 5.49 km^{2} (2.12 sq mi)
- Elevation: 251 m (823 ft)
- Highest elevation: 268 m (879 ft)
- Lowest elevation: 94 m (308 ft)
- Population (2023): 86
  - Density: 16/km^{2} (41/sq mi)
- Time zone: UTC+01:00 (CET)
  - Summer (DST): UTC+02:00 (CEST)
- INSEE/Postal code: 24122 /24170
- ^{1} French Land Register data, which excludes lakes, ponds, glaciers > 1 km^{2} (0.386 sq mi or 247 acres) and river estuaries.

Cladech (French pronunciation: [kladɛʃ]) is a commune in the Dordogne department in Nouvelle-Aquitaine in southwestern France.

== Population ==
Historical population
Year	Pop.	±% p.a.
1968	115	—
1975	91	−3.29%
1982	96	+0.77%
1990	81	−2.10%
1999	84	+0.40%
2007	89	+0.73%
2012	93	+0.88%
2017	105	+2.46%
2023	86	−3.27%
Source: INSEE

== See also ==
- Communes of the Dordogne department
