= Monplaisant =

- Commune
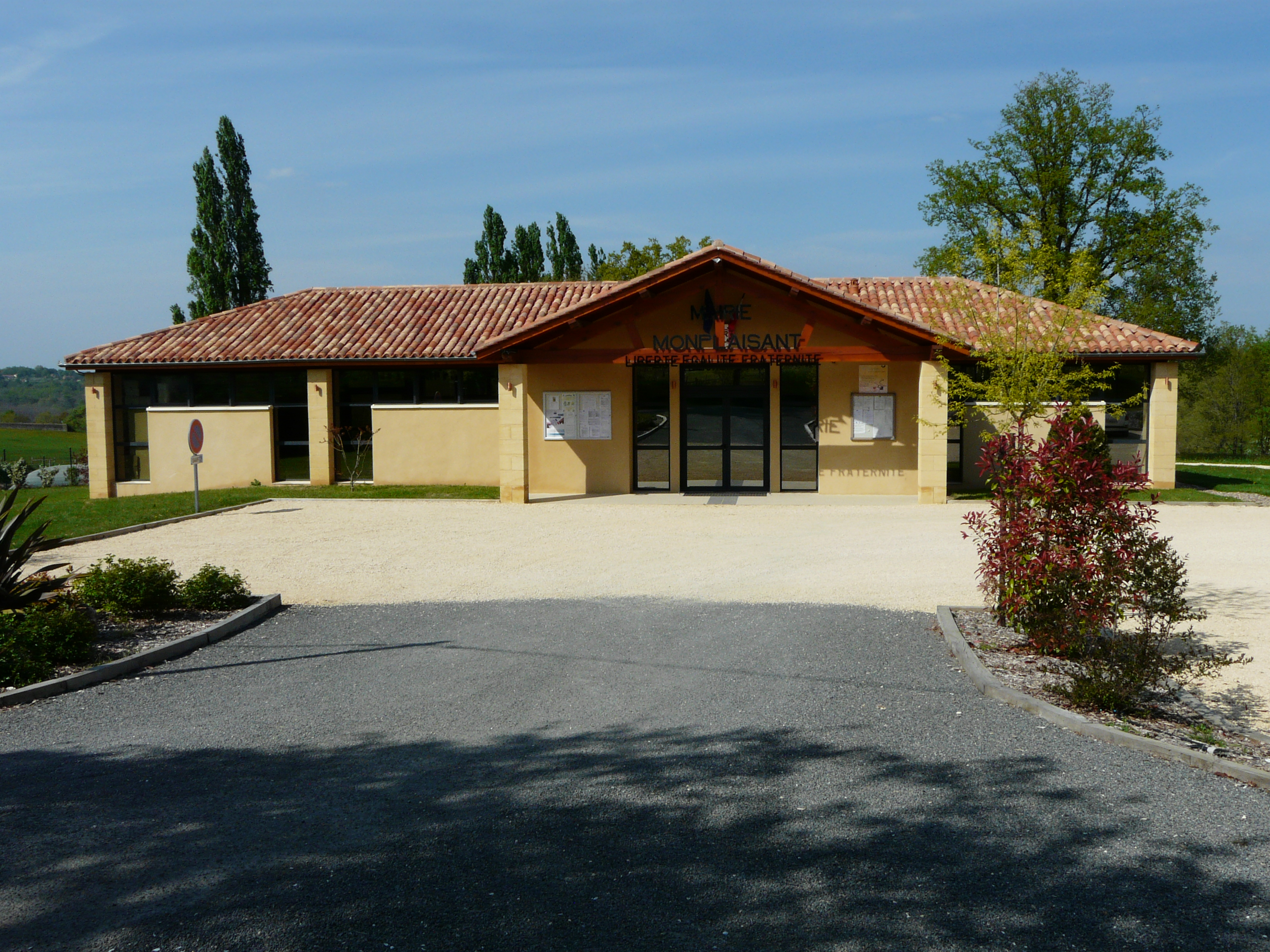
- The town hall in Monplaisant

- Coat of arms
- Location of Monplaisant
- Location within France Location within Nouvelle-Aquitaine
- Coordinates: 44°47′24″N 0°59′54″E
- Country: France
- Region: Nouvelle-Aquitaine
- Department: Dordogne
- Arrondissement: Sarlat-la-Canéda
- Canton: Vallée Dordogne

Government
  - Mayor (2020–2026): Jean-Bernard Lalue
- Area^{1}: 5.56 km^{2} (2.15 sq mi)
- Elevation: 163 m (535 ft)
- Highest elevation: 193 m (633 ft)
- Lowest elevation: 65 m (213 ft)
- Population (2023): 265
  - Density: 47.7/km^{2} (123/sq mi)
- Time zone: UTC+01:00 (CET)
  - Summer (DST): UTC+02:00 (CEST)
- INSEE/Postal code: 24293 /24170
- ^{1} French Land Register data, which excludes lakes, ponds, glaciers > 1 km^{2} (0.386 sq mi or 247 acres) and river estuaries.

Monplaisant (French pronunciation: [mɔ̃plɛzɑ̃]; Occitan: Montplasent) is a commune in the Dordogne department in Nouvelle-Aquitaine in southwestern France.

== Population ==
Historical population
Year	Pop.	±% p.a.
1968	211	—
1975	202	−0.62%
1982	218	+1.09%
1990	216	−0.12%
1999	251	+1.68%
2007	271	+0.96%
2012	276	+0.37%
2017	296	+1.41%
2023	265	−1.83%
Source: INSEE

== See also ==
- Communes of the Dordogne department
