= Allas-les-Mines =

- Commune
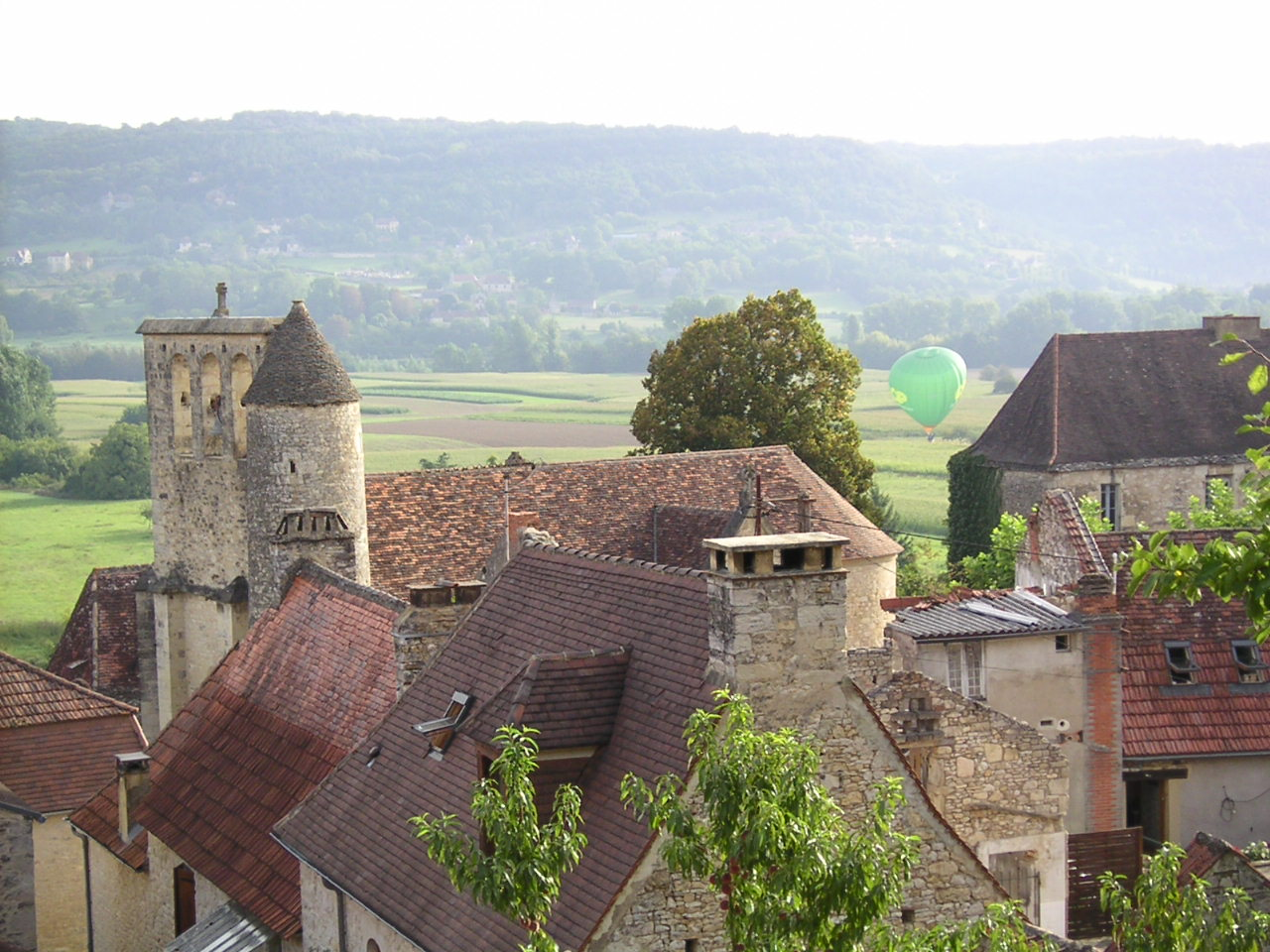
- The village of Allas-les-Mines

- Coat of arms
- Location of Allas-les-Mines
- Location within France Location within Nouvelle-Aquitaine
- Coordinates: 44°50′03″N 1°04′23″E
- Country: France
- Region: Nouvelle-Aquitaine
- Department: Dordogne
- Arrondissement: Sarlat-la-Canéda
- Canton: Vallée Dordogne
- Intercommunality: Vallée de la Dordogne et Forêt Bessède

Government
  - Mayor (2020–2026): Jean-François Laravoire
- Area^{1}: 7.04 km^{2} (2.72 sq mi)
- Elevation: 100 m (330 ft)
- Highest elevation: 250 m (820 ft)
- Lowest elevation: 56 m (184 ft)
- Population (2023): 203
  - Density: 28.8/km^{2} (74.7/sq mi)
- Time zone: UTC+01:00 (CET)
  - Summer (DST): UTC+02:00 (CEST)
- INSEE/Postal code: 24006 /24220
- ^{1} French Land Register data, which excludes lakes, ponds, glaciers > 1 km^{2} (0.386 sq mi or 247 acres) and river estuaries.

Allas-les-Mines (French pronunciation: [alas le min]; Occitan: Alàs) is a commune in the Dordogne department in Nouvelle-Aquitaine in southwestern France.

== Population ==
Historical population
Year	Pop.	±% p.a.
1968	236	—
1975	198	−2.48%
1982	185	−0.97%
1990	203	+1.17%
1999	224	+1.10%
2007	206	−1.04%
2012	202	−0.39%
2017	204	+0.20%
2023	203	−0.08%
Source: INSEE

== History ==
In 1910, the commune of Allas-de-Berbiguières was renamed Allas-les-Mines.

== Places and monuments ==
Museum "La rue du temps qui passe" (Boom Collection), created in 2017: over 1,000 m2, reconstruction of an early 20th century street.

== See also ==
- Communes of the Dordogne département
