= Saint-Pompon =

- Commune
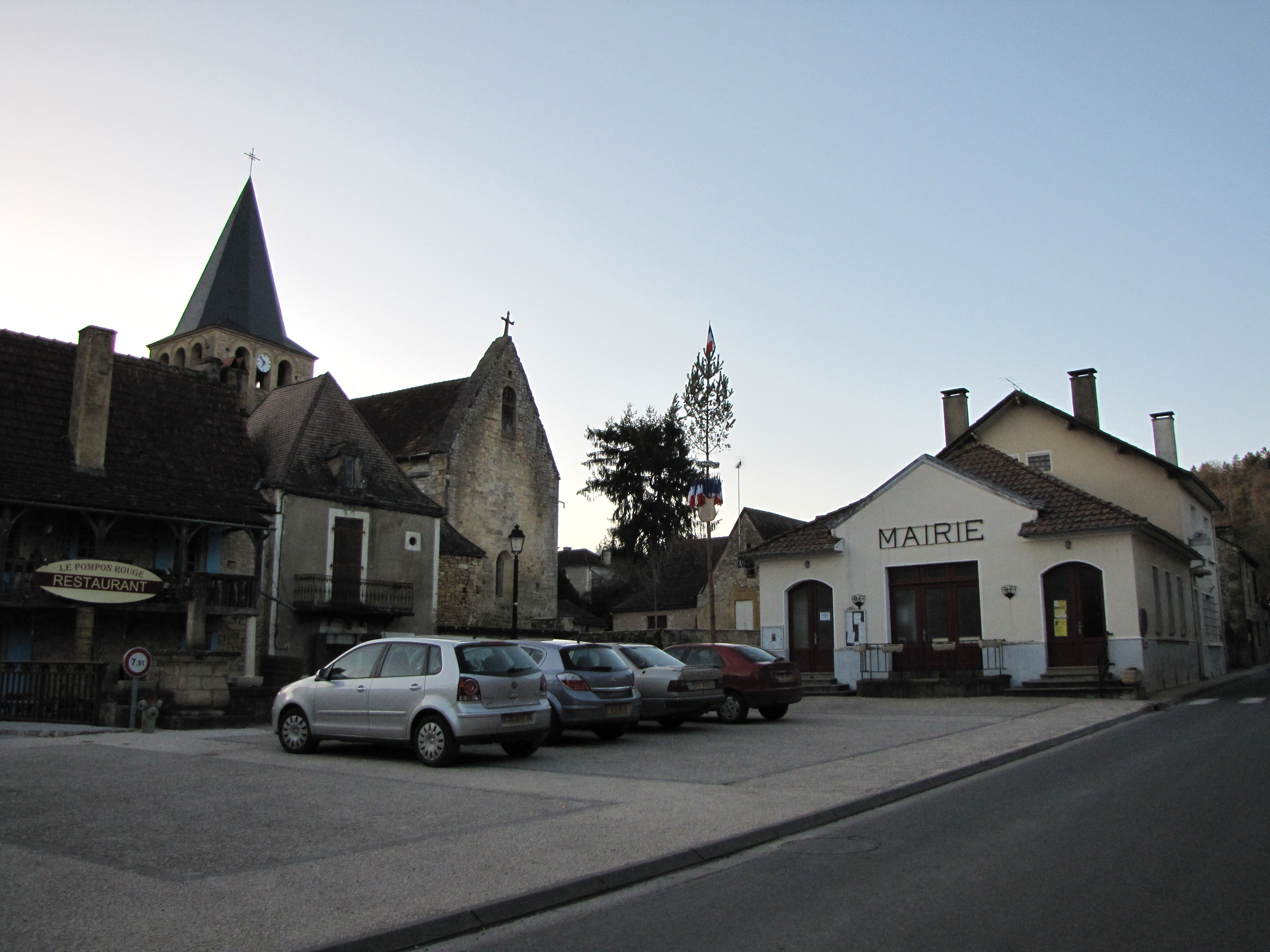
- The town hall in Saint-Pompont
- Location of Saint-Pompon
- Location within France Location within Nouvelle-Aquitaine
- Coordinates: 44°43′38″N 1°08′52″E
- Country: France
- Region: Nouvelle-Aquitaine
- Department: Dordogne
- Arrondissement: Sarlat-la-Canéda
- Canton: Vallée Dordogne

Government
  - Mayor (2020–2026): Carole Henry
- Area^{1}: 27.40 km^{2} (10.58 sq mi)
- Elevation: 131 m (430 ft)
- Highest elevation: 334 m (1,096 ft)
- Lowest elevation: 110 m (360 ft)
- Population (2023): 373
  - Density: 13.6/km^{2} (35.3/sq mi)
- Time zone: UTC+01:00 (CET)
  - Summer (DST): UTC+02:00 (CEST)
- INSEE/Postal code: 24488 /24170
- ^{1} French Land Register data, which excludes lakes, ponds, glaciers > 1 km^{2} (0.386 sq mi or 247 acres) and river estuaries.

Saint-Pompon (French pronunciation: [sɛ̃ pɔ̃pɔ̃]; before 2024: Saint-Pompont; Occitan: Sent Plemponh) is a commune in the Dordogne department in Nouvelle-Aquitaine in southwestern France.

== Population ==
Historical population
Year	Pop.	±% p.a.
1968	516	—
1975	506	−0.28%
1982	521	+0.42%
1990	452	−1.76%
1999	405	−1.21%
2007	429	+0.72%
2012	431	+0.09%
2017	372	−2.90%
2023	373	+0.04%
Source: INSEE

== See also ==
- Communes of the Dordogne department
