= Saint-Laurent-la-Vallée =

- Commune
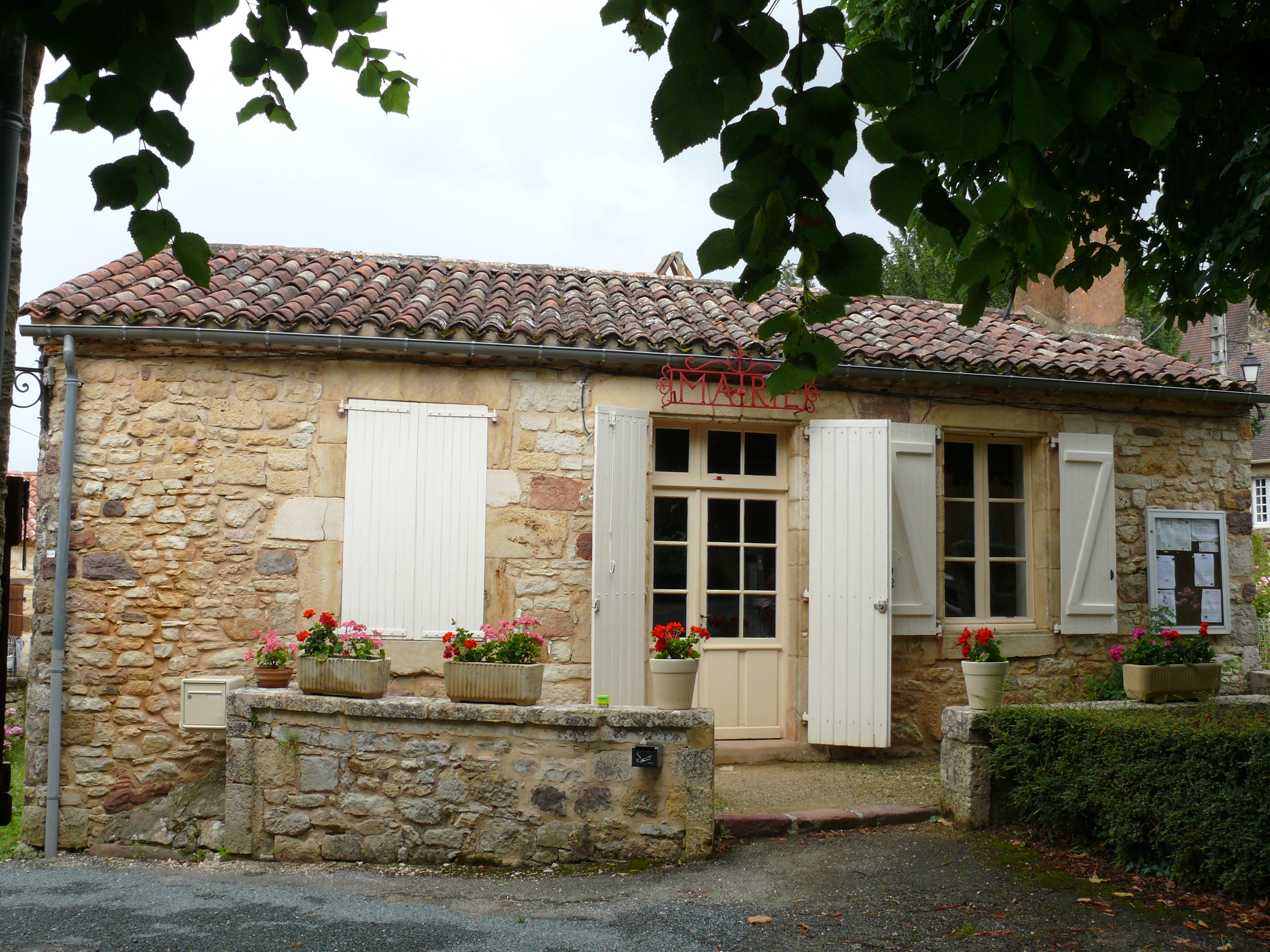
- The town hall in Saint-Laurent-la-Vallée

- Coat of arms
- Location of Saint-Laurent-la-Vallée
- Location within France Location within Nouvelle-Aquitaine
- Coordinates: 44°44′59″N 1°06′37″E
- Country: France
- Region: Nouvelle-Aquitaine
- Department: Dordogne
- Arrondissement: Sarlat-la-Canéda
- Canton: Vallée Dordogne

Government
  - Mayor (2020–2026): Lilian Gilet
- Area^{1}: 15.07 km^{2} (5.82 sq mi)
- Elevation: 217 m (712 ft)
- Highest elevation: 310 m (1,020 ft)
- Lowest elevation: 128 m (420 ft)
- Population (2023): 237
  - Density: 15.7/km^{2} (40.7/sq mi)
- Time zone: UTC+01:00 (CET)
  - Summer (DST): UTC+02:00 (CEST)
- INSEE/Postal code: 24438 /24170
- ^{1} French Land Register data, which excludes lakes, ponds, glaciers > 1 km^{2} (0.386 sq mi or 247 acres) and river estuaries.

Saint-Laurent-la-Vallée (French pronunciation: [sɛ̃ loʁɑ̃ la vale]; Occitan: Sent Laurenç de Valech) is a commune in the Dordogne department in Nouvelle-Aquitaine in southwestern France.

== Population ==
Historical population
| Year | Pop. | ±% p.a. |
|---|---|---|
| 1968 | 316 | — |
| 1975 | 280 | −1.71% |
| 1982 | 238 | −2.29% |
| 1990 | 258 | +1.01% |
| 1999 | 270 | +0.51% |
| 2007 | 257 | −0.61% |
| 2012 | 261 | +0.31% |
| 2017 | 247 | −1.10% |
| 2023 | 237 | −0.69% |
Source: INSEE

== See also ==
- Communes of the Dordogne department
