= Groléjac =

- Commune
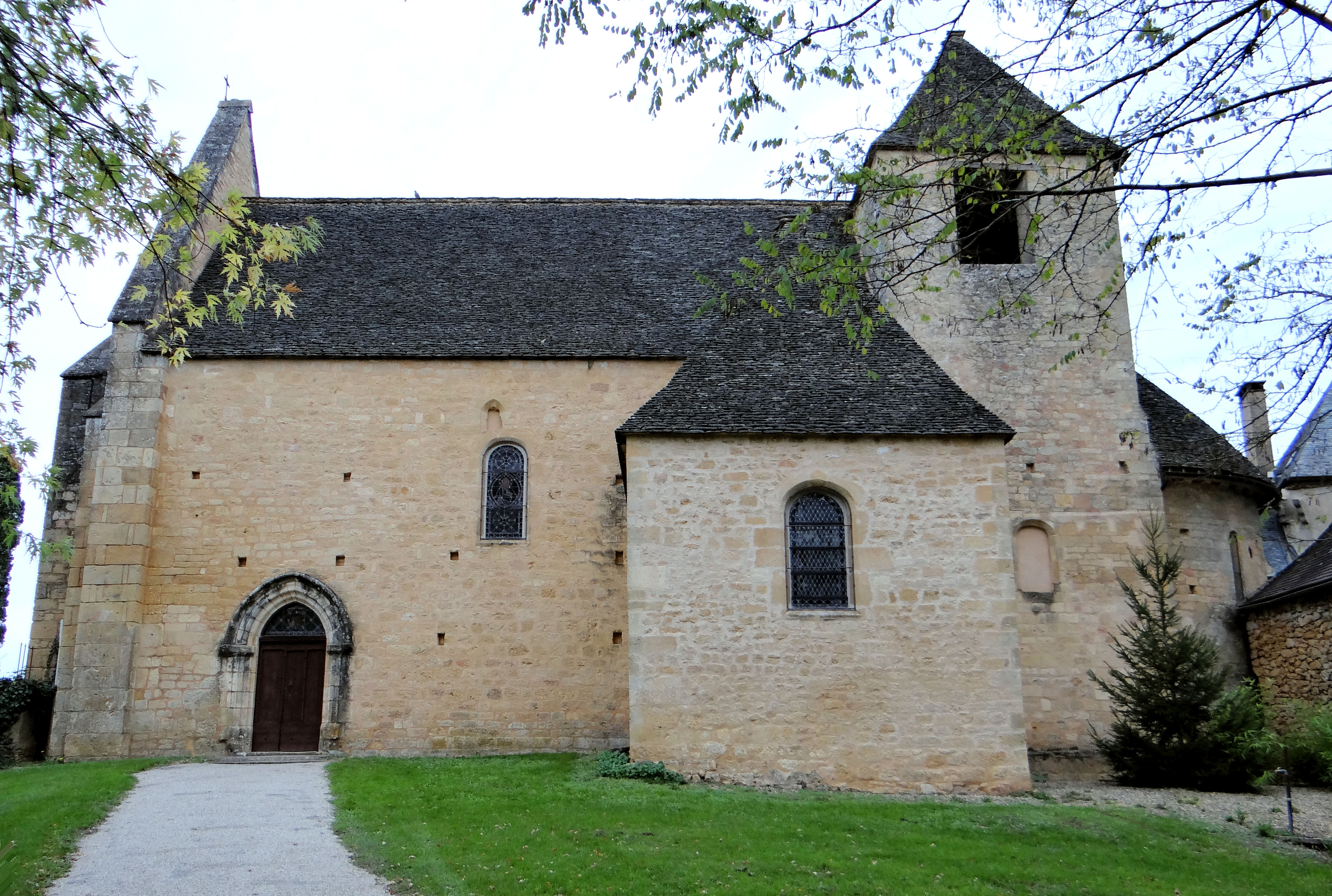
- The church in Groléjac

- Coat of arms
- Location of Groléjac
- Location within France Location within Nouvelle-Aquitaine
- Coordinates: 44°49′05″N 1°17′47″E
- Country: France
- Region: Nouvelle-Aquitaine
- Department: Dordogne
- Arrondissement: Sarlat-la-Canéda
- Canton: Vallée Dordogne

Government
  - Mayor (2021–2026): Bernard Mazet
- Area^{1}: 12.28 km^{2} (4.74 sq mi)
- Highest elevation: 282 m (925 ft)
- Lowest elevation: 61 m (200 ft)
- Population (2023): 686
  - Density: 55.9/km^{2} (145/sq mi)
- Time zone: UTC+01:00 (CET)
  - Summer (DST): UTC+02:00 (CEST)
- INSEE/Postal code: 24207 /24250
- ^{1} French Land Register data, which excludes lakes, ponds, glaciers > 1 km^{2} (0.386 sq mi or 247 acres) and river estuaries.

Groléjac (French pronunciation: [ɡʁɔleʒak]; Occitan: Graulejac) is a commune in the Dordogne department in Nouvelle-Aquitaine in southwestern France.

== Population ==
Historical population
Year	Pop.	±% p.a.
1968	484	—
1975	506	+0.64%
1982	541	+0.96%
1990	545	+0.09%
1999	580	+0.69%
2007	610	+0.63%
2012	628	+0.58%
2017	654	+0.81%
2023	686	+0.80%
Source: INSEE

== See also ==
- Communes of the Dordogne department
