= Loubejac =

- Commune
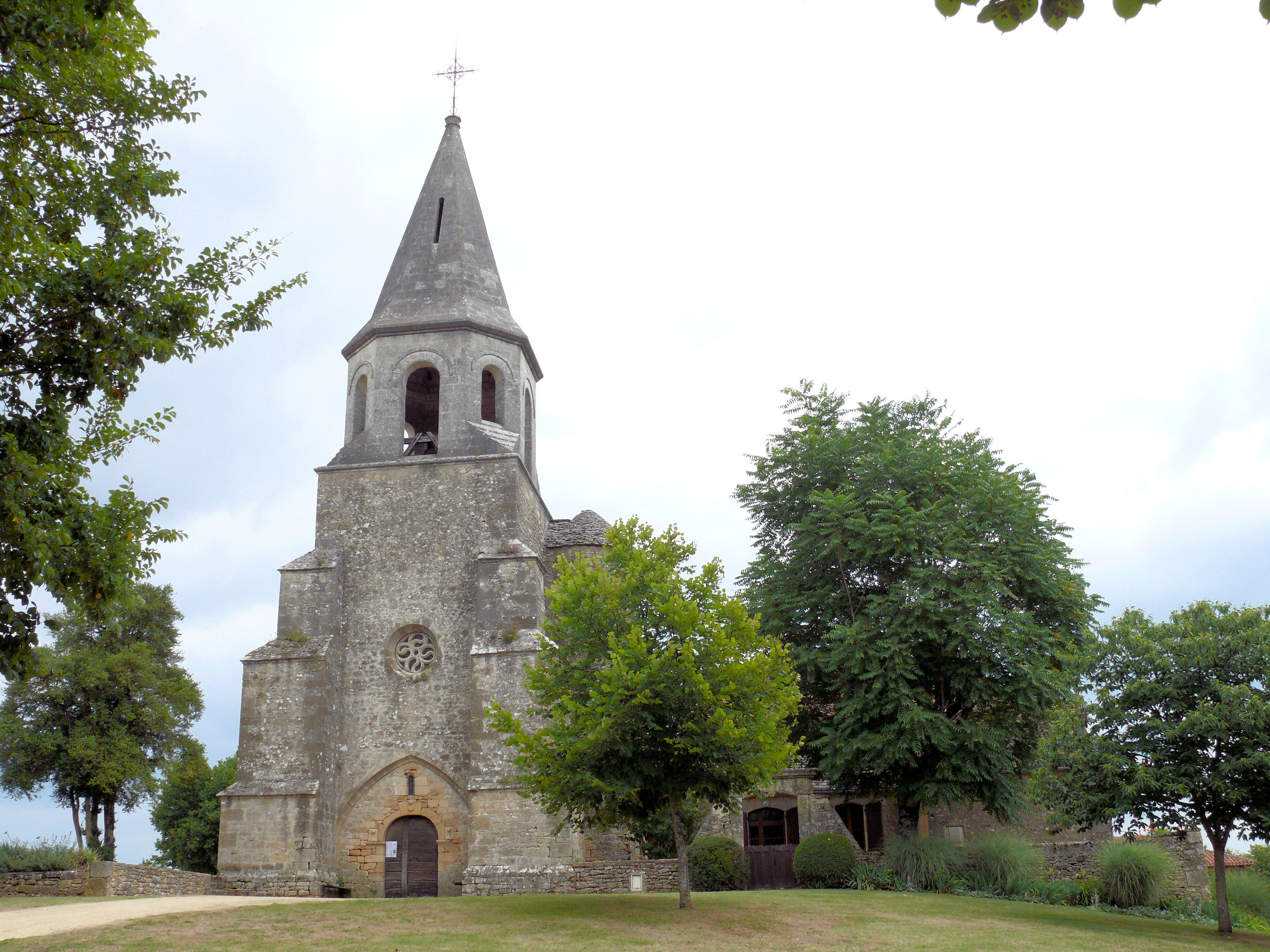
- The church in Loubejac
- Location of Loubejac
- Location within France Location within Nouvelle-Aquitaine
- Coordinates: 44°35′37″N 1°05′18″E
- Country: France
- Region: Nouvelle-Aquitaine
- Department: Dordogne
- Arrondissement: Sarlat-la-Canéda
- Canton: Vallée Dordogne

Government
  - Mayor (2020–2026): Alain Calmeille
- Area^{1}: 18.55 km^{2} (7.16 sq mi)
- Elevation: 250 m (820 ft)
- Highest elevation: 287 m (942 ft)
- Lowest elevation: 135 m (443 ft)
- Population (2023): 266
  - Density: 14.3/km^{2} (37.1/sq mi)
- Time zone: UTC+01:00 (CET)
  - Summer (DST): UTC+02:00 (CEST)
- INSEE/Postal code: 24245 /24550
- ^{1} French Land Register data, which excludes lakes, ponds, glaciers > 1 km^{2} (0.386 sq mi or 247 acres) and river estuaries.

Loubejac (French pronunciation: [lubʒak]; Occitan: Lobejac) is a commune in the Dordogne department in Nouvelle-Aquitaine in southwestern France.

== Population ==
Historical population
| Year | Pop. | ±% p.a. |
|---|---|---|
| 1968 | 283 | — |
| 1975 | 280 | −0.15% |
| 1982 | 253 | −1.44% |
| 1990 | 234 | −0.97% |
| 1999 | 233 | −0.05% |
| 2007 | 246 | +0.68% |
| 2012 | 273 | +2.10% |
| 2017 | 264 | −0.67% |
| 2023 | 266 | +0.13% |
Source: INSEE

== See also ==
- Communes of the Dordogne department
