= Carves =

- Commune
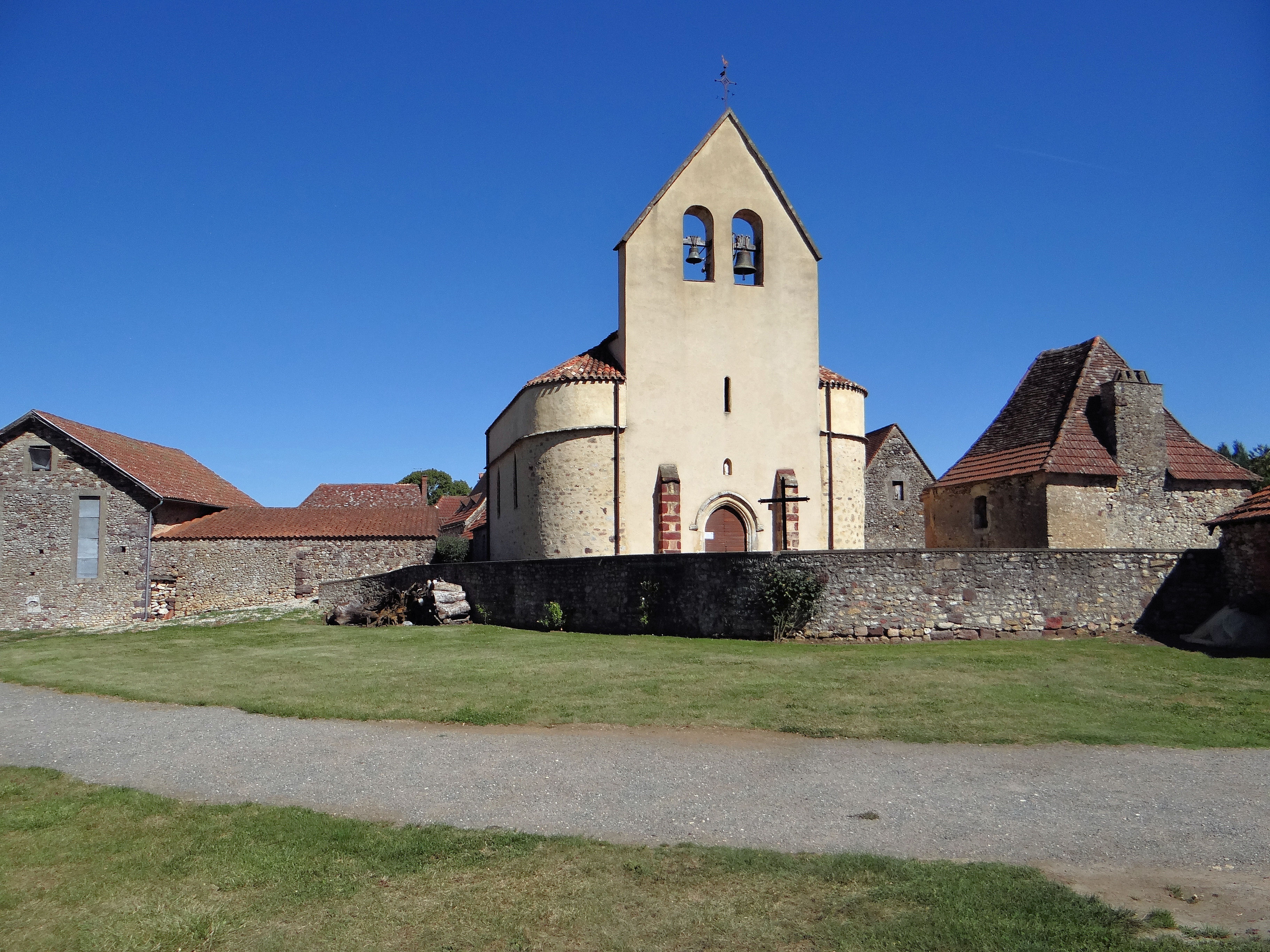
- The church in Carves

- Coat of arms
- Location of Carves
- Location within France Location within Nouvelle-Aquitaine
- Coordinates: 44°47′13″N 1°03′58″E
- Country: France
- Region: Nouvelle-Aquitaine
- Department: Dordogne
- Arrondissement: Sarlat-la-Canéda
- Canton: Vallée Dordogne

Government
  - Mayor (2020–2026): Maryvonne Chaumel
- Area^{1}: 10.13 km^{2} (3.91 sq mi)
- Elevation: 240 m (790 ft)
- Highest elevation: 262 m (860 ft)
- Lowest elevation: 87 m (285 ft)
- Population (2023): 98
  - Density: 9.7/km^{2} (25/sq mi)
- Time zone: UTC+01:00 (CET)
  - Summer (DST): UTC+02:00 (CEST)
- INSEE/Postal code: 24084 /24170
- ^{1} French Land Register data, which excludes lakes, ponds, glaciers > 1 km^{2} (0.386 sq mi or 247 acres) and river estuaries.

Carves (French pronunciation: [kaʁv]; Occitan: Carvas) is a commune in the Dordogne department in Nouvelle-Aquitaine in southwestern France.

== Population ==
Historical population
Year	Pop.	±% p.a.
1968	153	—
1975	148	−0.47%
1982	138	−0.99%
1990	131	−0.65%
1999	112	−1.73%
2007	112	+0.00%
2012	107	−0.91%
2017	104	−0.57%
2023	98	−0.99%
Source: INSEE

== See also ==
- Communes of the Dordogne department
