= Canton of Vallée Dordogne =

Coordinates: 44.87°N 1.04°E

The canton of Vallée Dordogne is an administrative division of the Dordogne department, southwestern France. It was created at the French canton reorganisation which came into effect in March 2015. Its seat is in Saint-Cyprien.

It consists of the following communes:

1. Allas-les-Mines
2. Audrix
3. Berbiguières
4. Besse
5. Bouzic
6. Campagnac-lès-Quercy
7. Carves
8. Castelnaud-la-Chapelle
9. Castels et Bézenac
10. Cénac-et-Saint-Julien
11. Cladech
12. Coux-et-Bigaroque-Mouzens
13. Daglan
14. Doissat
15. Domme
16. Florimont-Gaumier
17. Grives
18. Groléjac
19. Larzac
20. Lavaur
21. Loubejac
22. Marnac
23. Mazeyrolles
24. Meyrals
25. Monplaisant
26. Nabirat
27. Orliac
28. Pays-de-Belvès
29. Prats-du-Périgord
30. Sagelat
31. Saint-Aubin-de-Nabirat
32. Saint-Cernin-de-l'Herm
33. Saint-Cybranet
34. Saint-Cyprien
35. Sainte-Foy-de-Belvès
36. Saint-Germain-de-Belvès
37. Saint-Laurent-la-Vallée
38. Saint-Martial-de-Nabirat
39. Saint-Pardoux-et-Vielvic
40. Saint-Pompont
41. Salles-de-Belvès
42. Siorac-en-Périgord
43. Veyrines-de-Domme
44. Villefranche-du-Périgord
