= Doissat =

- Commune
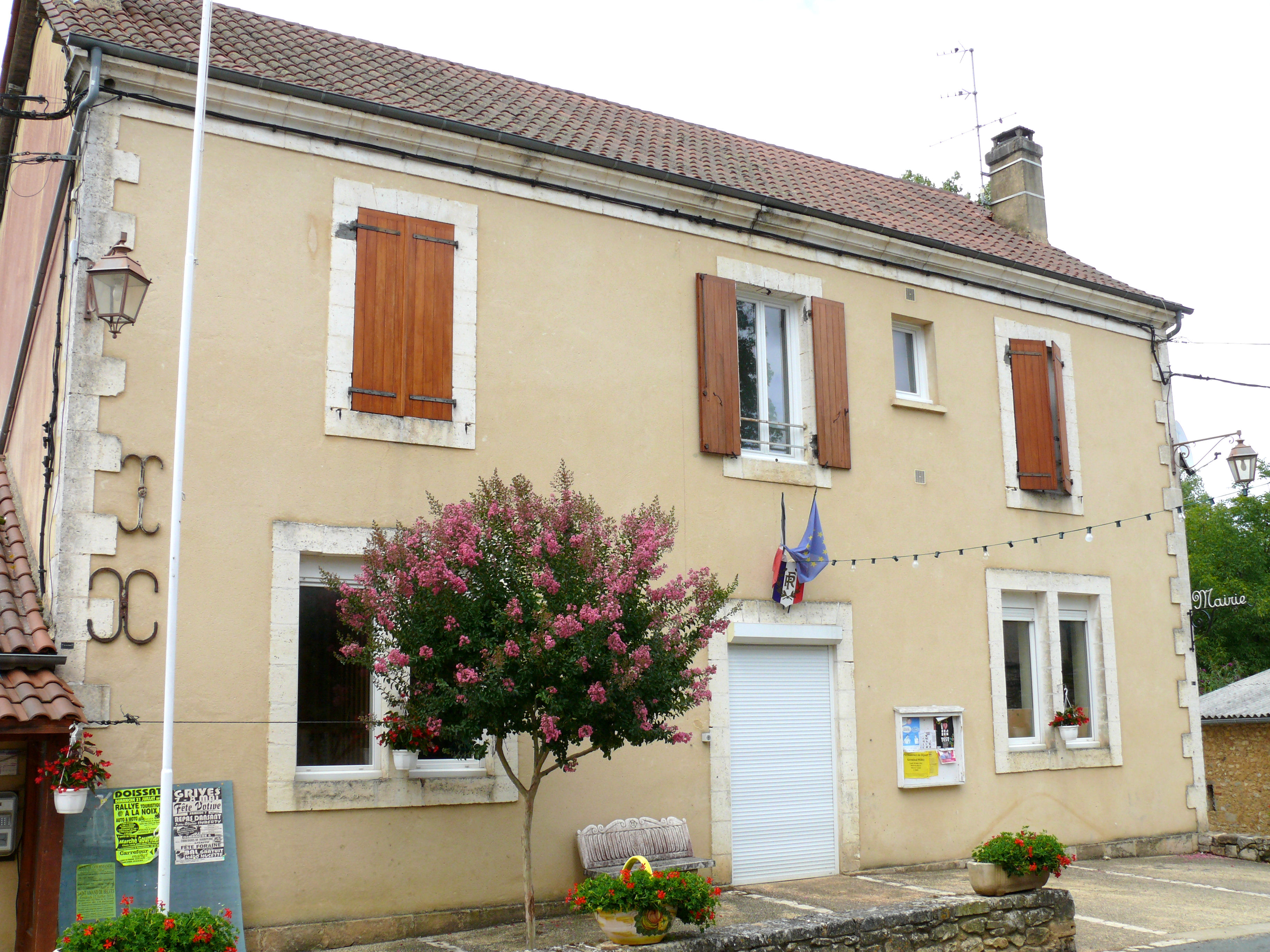
- The town hall in Doissat
- Location of Doissat
- Location within France Location within Nouvelle-Aquitaine
- Coordinates: 44°43′56″N 1°04′11″E
- Country: France
- Region: Nouvelle-Aquitaine
- Department: Dordogne
- Arrondissement: Sarlat-la-Canéda
- Canton: Vallée Dordogne

Government
  - Mayor (2021–2026): Bruno Lallier
- Area^{1}: 15.30 km^{2} (5.91 sq mi)
- Elevation: 250 m (820 ft)
- Highest elevation: 323 m (1,060 ft)
- Lowest elevation: 131 m (430 ft)
- Population (2023): 99
  - Density: 6.5/km^{2} (17/sq mi)
- Time zone: UTC+01:00 (CET)
  - Summer (DST): UTC+02:00 (CEST)
- INSEE/Postal code: 24151 /24170
- ^{1} French Land Register data, which excludes lakes, ponds, glaciers > 1 km^{2} (0.386 sq mi or 247 acres) and river estuaries.

Doissat (French pronunciation: [dwasa]; Occitan: Doissac) is a commune in the Dordogne department in Nouvelle-Aquitaine in southwestern France.

== Population ==
Historical population
Year	Pop.	±% p.a.
1968	153	—
1975	137	−1.57%
1982	127	−1.08%
1990	125	−0.20%
1999	127	+0.18%
2007	115	−1.23%
2012	131	+2.64%
2017	105	−4.33%
2023	99	−0.98%
Source: INSEE

== See also ==
- Communes of the Dordogne department
