= Veyrines-de-Domme =

- Commune
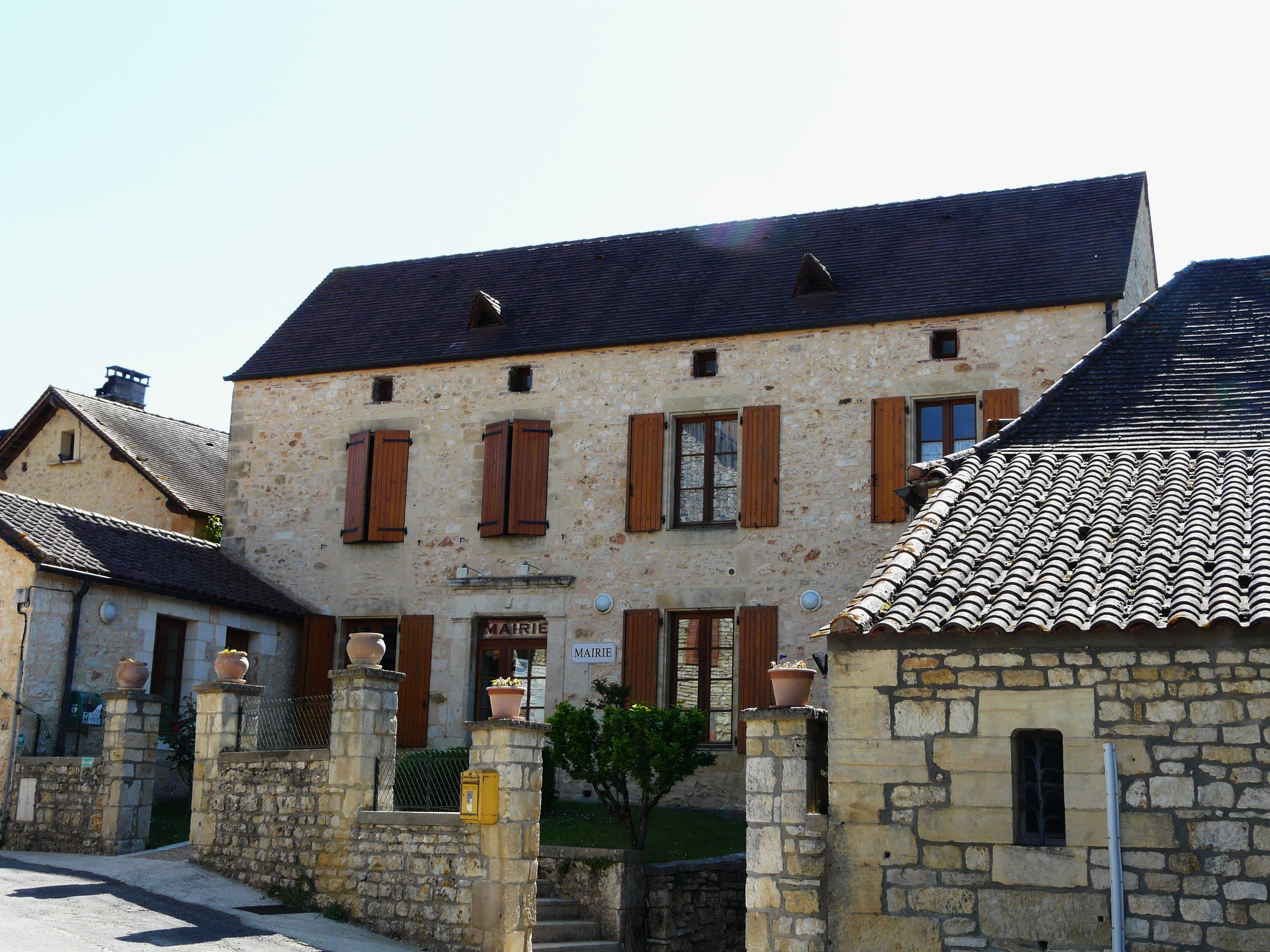
- The town hall in Veyrines-de-Domme
- Location of Veyrines-de-Domme
- Location within France Location within Nouvelle-Aquitaine
- Coordinates: 44°47′39″N 1°06′20″E
- Country: France
- Region: Nouvelle-Aquitaine
- Department: Dordogne
- Arrondissement: Sarlat-la-Canéda
- Canton: Vallée Dordogne
- Intercommunality: Domme - Villefranche du Périgord

Government
  - Mayor (2020–2026): Pascal Delpech
- Area^{1}: 11.44 km^{2} (4.42 sq mi)
- Elevation: 240 m (790 ft)
- Highest elevation: 280 m (920 ft)
- Lowest elevation: 79 m (259 ft)
- Population (2023): 236
  - Density: 20.6/km^{2} (53.4/sq mi)
- Time zone: UTC+01:00 (CET)
  - Summer (DST): UTC+02:00 (CEST)
- INSEE/Postal code: 24575 /24250
- ^{1} French Land Register data, which excludes lakes, ponds, glaciers > 1 km^{2} (0.386 sq mi or 247 acres) and river estuaries.

Veyrines-de-Domme (French pronunciation: [veʁin də dɔm]) is a commune in the Dordogne department in Nouvelle-Aquitaine in southwestern France.

== Population ==
Historical population
Year	Pop.	±% p.a.
1968	194	—
1975	201	+0.51%
1982	199	−0.14%
1990	219	+1.20%
1999	196	−1.23%
2007	212	+0.99%
2012	225	+1.20%
2017	230	+0.44%
2023	236	+0.43%
Source: INSEE

== See also ==
- Communes of the Dordogne department
