= Lavaur, Dordogne =

Lavaur
- Commune
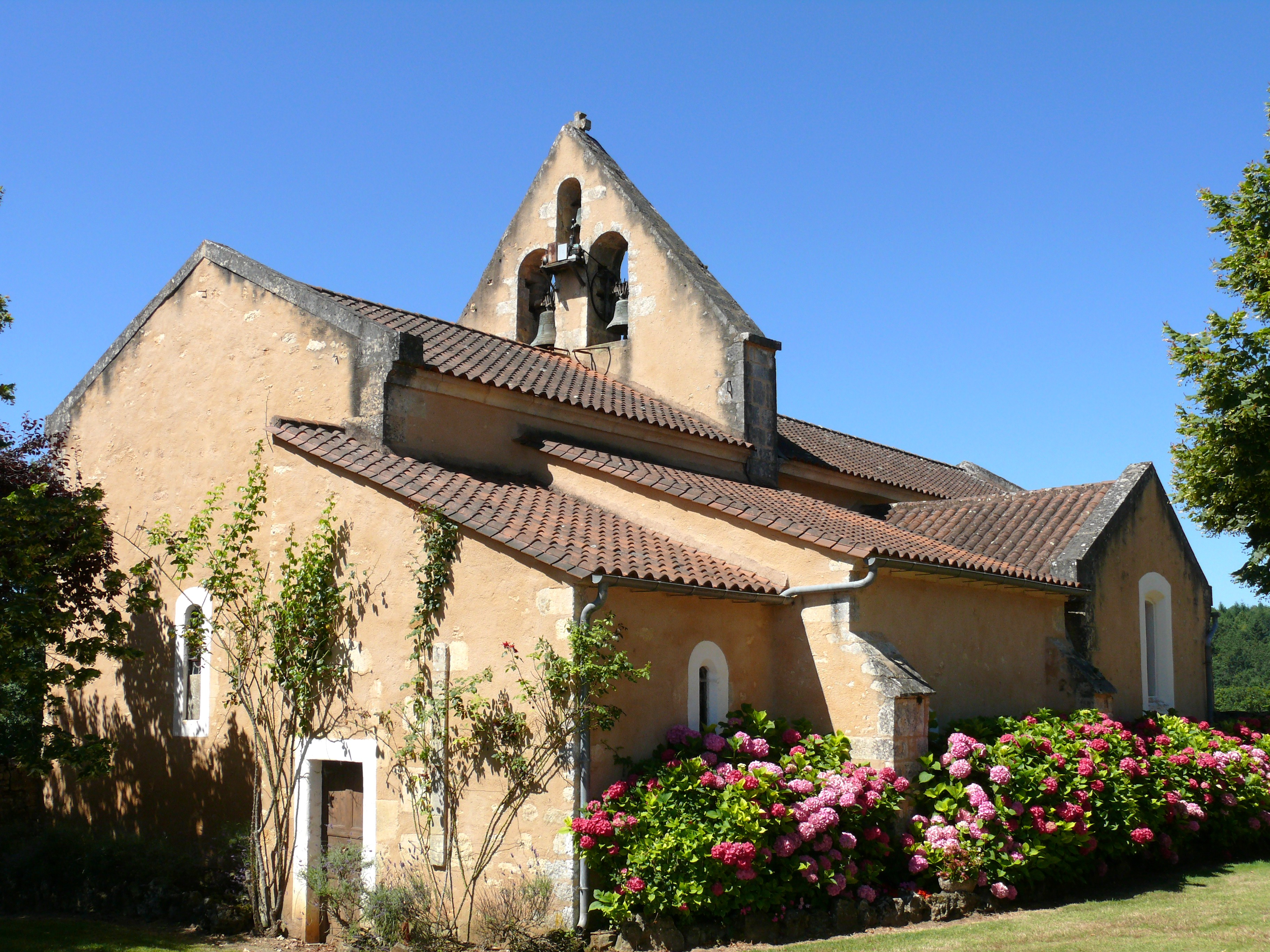
- The church in Lavaur
- Location of Lavaur
- Location within France Location within Nouvelle-Aquitaine
- Coordinates: 44°36′51″N 1°01′27″E
- Country: France
- Region: Nouvelle-Aquitaine
- Department: Dordogne
- Arrondissement: Sarlat-la-Canéda
- Canton: Vallée Dordogne

Government
  - Mayor (2020–2026): Michel Lapouge
- Area^{1}: 9.00 km^{2} (3.47 sq mi)
- Elevation: 250 m (820 ft)
- Highest elevation: 282 m (925 ft)
- Lowest elevation: 135 m (443 ft)
- Population (2023): 85
  - Density: 9.4/km^{2} (24/sq mi)
- Time zone: UTC+01:00 (CET)
  - Summer (DST): UTC+02:00 (CEST)
- INSEE/Postal code: 24232 /24550
- ^{1} French Land Register data, which excludes lakes, ponds, glaciers > 1 km^{2} (0.386 sq mi or 247 acres) and river estuaries.

Lavaur (French pronunciation: [lavɔʁ]; Occitan: La Vaur) is a commune in the Dordogne department in Nouvelle-Aquitaine in southwestern France.

== Population ==
Historical population
Year	Pop.	±% p.a.
1968	153	—
1975	113	−4.24%
1982	107	−0.78%
1990	102	−0.60%
1999	88	−1.63%
2007	81	−1.03%
2012	65	−4.31%
2017	70	+1.49%
2023	85	+3.29%
Source: INSEE

== See also ==
- Communes of the Dordogne department
