= Nabirat =

- Commune
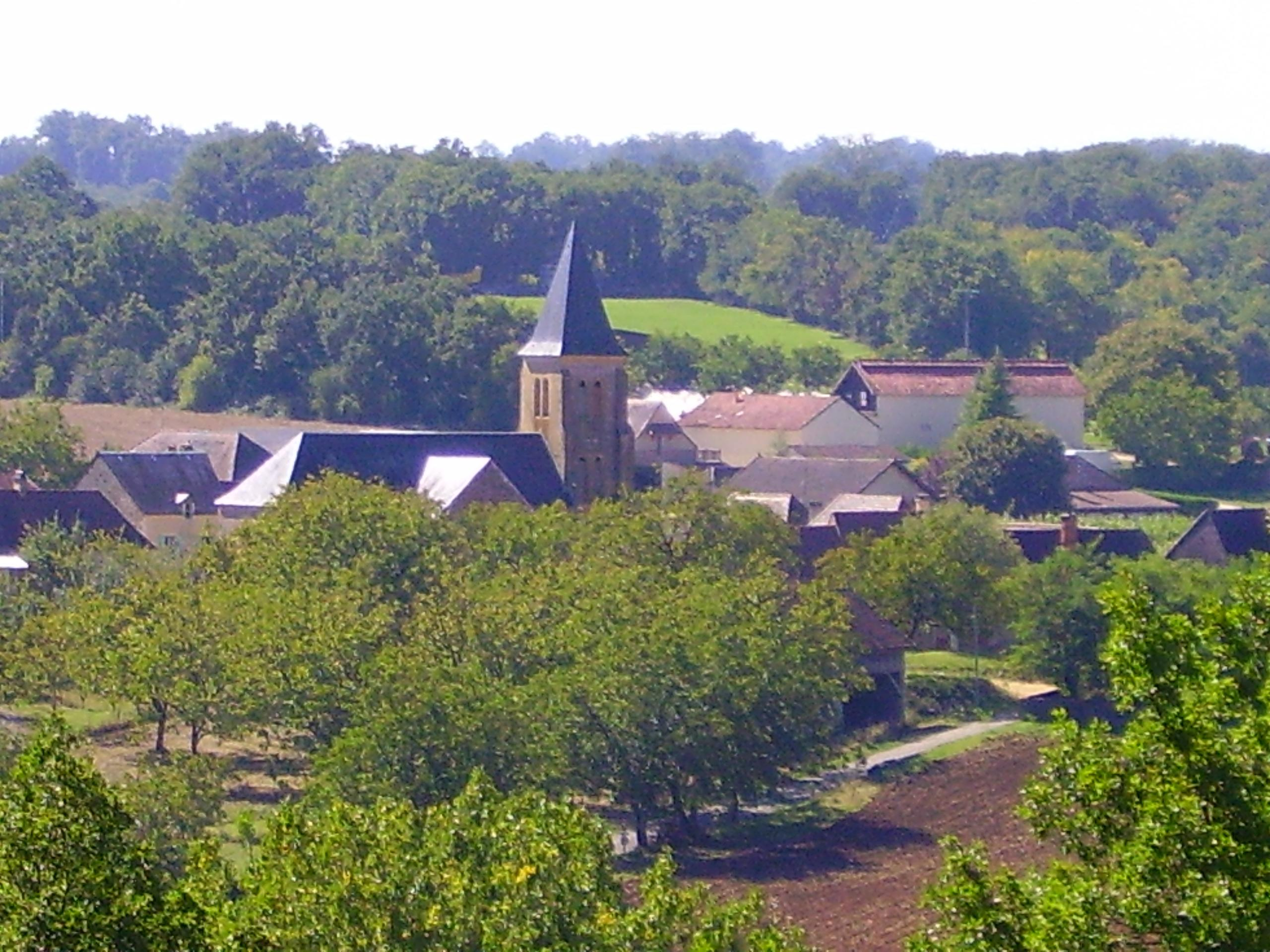
- A general view of Nabirat

- Coat of arms
- Location of Nabirat
- Location within France Location within Nouvelle-Aquitaine
- Coordinates: 44°45′15″N 1°17′55″E
- Country: France
- Region: Nouvelle-Aquitaine
- Department: Dordogne
- Arrondissement: Sarlat-la-Canéda
- Canton: Vallée Dordogne
- Intercommunality: Domme-Villefranche du Périgord

Government
  - Mayor (2020–2026): Yvette Vigié
- Area^{1}: 16.25 km^{2} (6.27 sq mi)
- Elevation: 161 m (528 ft)
- Highest elevation: 225 m (738 ft)
- Lowest elevation: 93 m (305 ft)
- Population (2023): 341
  - Density: 21.0/km^{2} (54.3/sq mi)
- Time zone: UTC+01:00 (CET)
  - Summer (DST): UTC+02:00 (CEST)
- INSEE/Postal code: 24300 /24250
- ^{1} French Land Register data, which excludes lakes, ponds, glaciers > 1 km^{2} (0.386 sq mi or 247 acres) and river estuaries.

Nabirat (French pronunciation: [nabiʁa]; Occitan: Nabirac) is a commune in the Dordogne department in Nouvelle-Aquitaine in southwestern France.

== Population ==
Historical population
Year	Pop.	±% p.a.
1968	333	—
1975	301	−1.43%
1982	316	+0.70%
1990	275	−1.72%
1999	331	+2.08%
2007	368	+1.33%
2012	378	+0.54%
2017	370	−0.43%
2023	341	−1.35%
Source: INSEE

== See also ==
- Communes of the Dordogne department
