= Miremont =

Miremont is the name or part of the name of the following communes in France:

- Miremont, Haute-Garonne, in the Haute-Garonne department
- Miremont, Puy-de-Dôme, in the Puy-de-Dôme department
- Mauzens-et-Miremont, in the Dordogne department
- Savignac-de-Miremont, in the Dordogne department
