= Château de Sauvebœuf =

Château de Sauvebœuf may refer to:

- Château de Sauvebœuf (Aubas), a château in Dordogne, Aquitane, France
- Château de Sauvebœuf (Lalinde), a château in Dordogne, Aquitane, France
