= Campagne, Dordogne =

Campagne
- Commune
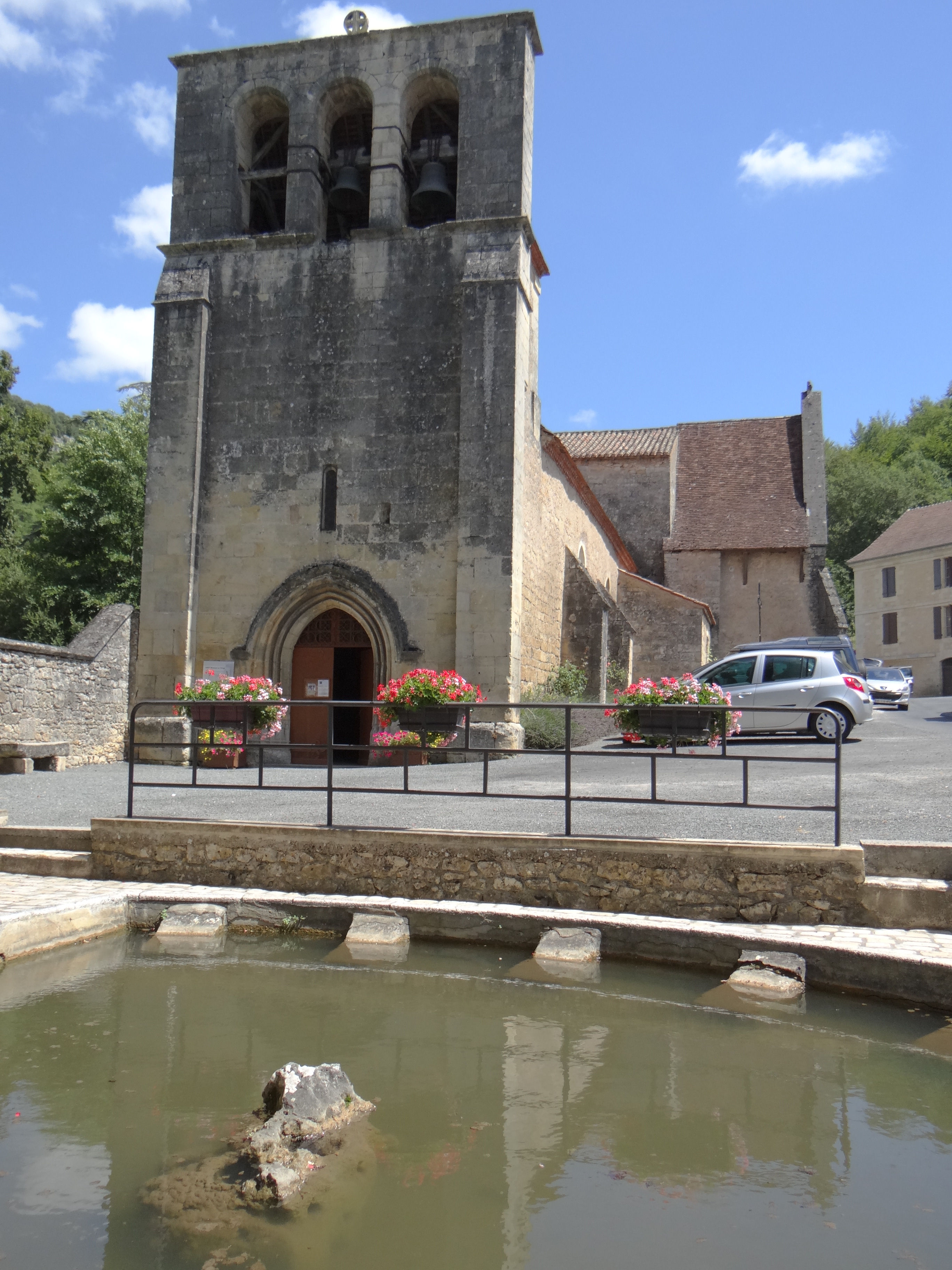
- The church in Campagne

- Coat of arms
- Location of Campagne
- Location within France Location within Nouvelle-Aquitaine
- Coordinates: 44°54′30″N 0°58′05″E
- Country: France
- Region: Nouvelle-Aquitaine
- Department: Dordogne
- Arrondissement: Sarlat-la-Canéda
- Canton: Vallée de l'Homme
- Intercommunality: Vallée de l'Homme

Government
  - Mayor (2020–2026): Thierry Péraro
- Area^{1}: 14.40 km^{2} (5.56 sq mi)
- Elevation: 60 m (200 ft)
- Highest elevation: 245 m (804 ft)
- Lowest elevation: 52 m (171 ft)
- Population (2023): 416
  - Density: 28.9/km^{2} (74.8/sq mi)
- Time zone: UTC+01:00 (CET)
  - Summer (DST): UTC+02:00 (CEST)
- INSEE/Postal code: 24076 /24260
- ^{1} French Land Register data, which excludes lakes, ponds, glaciers > 1 km^{2} (0.386 sq mi or 247 acres) and river estuaries.

Campagne (French pronunciation: [kɑ̃paɲ]; Occitan: Campanha) is a commune in the Dordogne department in Nouvelle-Aquitaine in southwestern France.

== Population ==
Historical population
Year	Pop.	±% p.a.
1968	242	—
1975	220	−1.35%
1982	220	+0.00%
1990	281	+3.11%
1999	310	+1.10%
2007	323	+0.51%
2012	397	+4.21%
2017	380	−0.87%
2023	416	+1.52%
Source: INSEE

== See also ==
- Château de Campagne
- Communes of the Dordogne department
