= La Ferrassie 1 =

Hominin fossil

Coordinates: 44°57′07″N 0°56′17″E

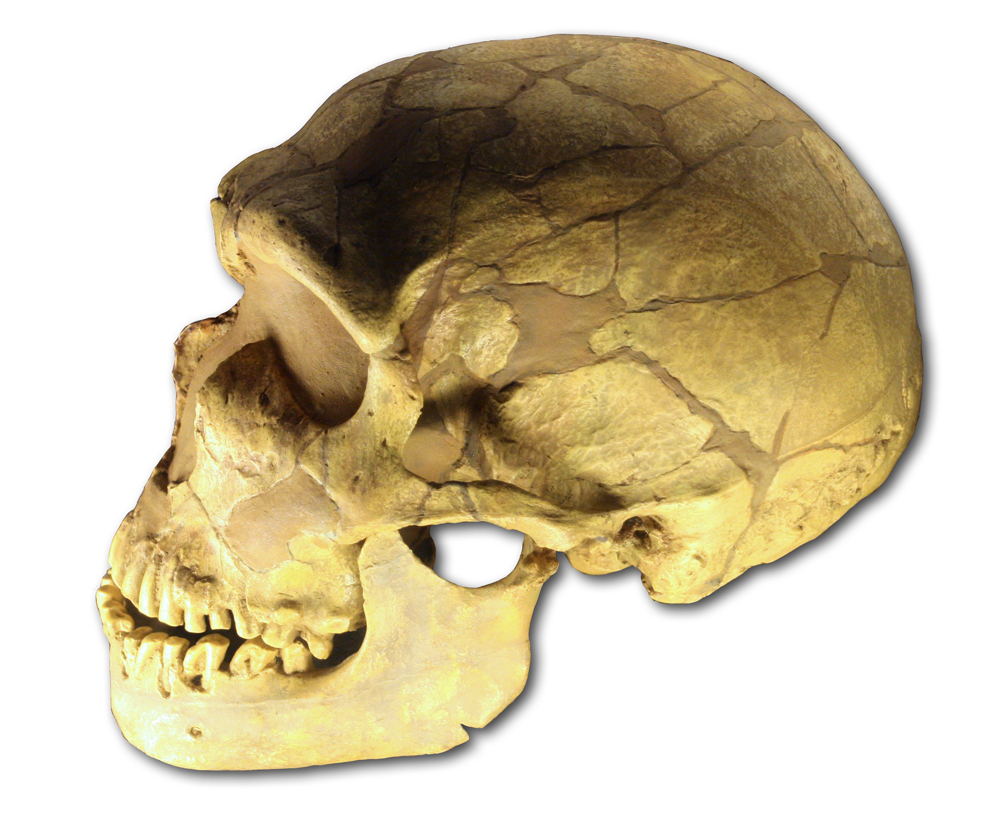
- Mold of La Ferrassie 1
- Catalog no.: La Ferrassie 1
- Species: Homo neanderthalensis
- Age: 59–45,000
- Place discovered: La Ferrassie, France
- Date discovered: 1909
- Discovered by: Capitan & Peyrony

La Ferrassie 1 (LF1) is a male Neanderthal skeleton estimated to be 58–50,000 years old. It was discovered at the La Ferrassie site in France by Louis Capitan and Denis Peyrony in 1909. The skull is the most complete Neanderthal skull ever found. With a cranial capacity of 1641 cm^{3}, it is the second largest hominid skull ever discovered, after Amud 1.

The skull displays many of the "classic" examples of Neanderthal anatomy, including a low, sloping forehead and large nasal openings.The teeth are well preserved and the incisors are heavily worn down, suggesting they were used to hold objects. His leg and foot bones make it clear that Neanderthals walked upright like modern humans.

However, additional bones were also discovered. Along with the skull; the scapulae, pelvis, hand, and foot remains were identified. The hand and foot had minor damage. The hands and fingers have been linked to rare conditions and the teeth have also been the subject matter to many human evolution theories. Nonetheless, the La Ferrassie 1 remains have proved to be beneficial in studying evolution over time. La Ferrassie 1, at the time of his death, was approximated to be 45 years old. This age would coincide with other Neanderthals who were considered elderly at this age. Some researchers have also used new technology to suggest a possible dating correction of La Ferrassie 1.

== Background and discovery ==
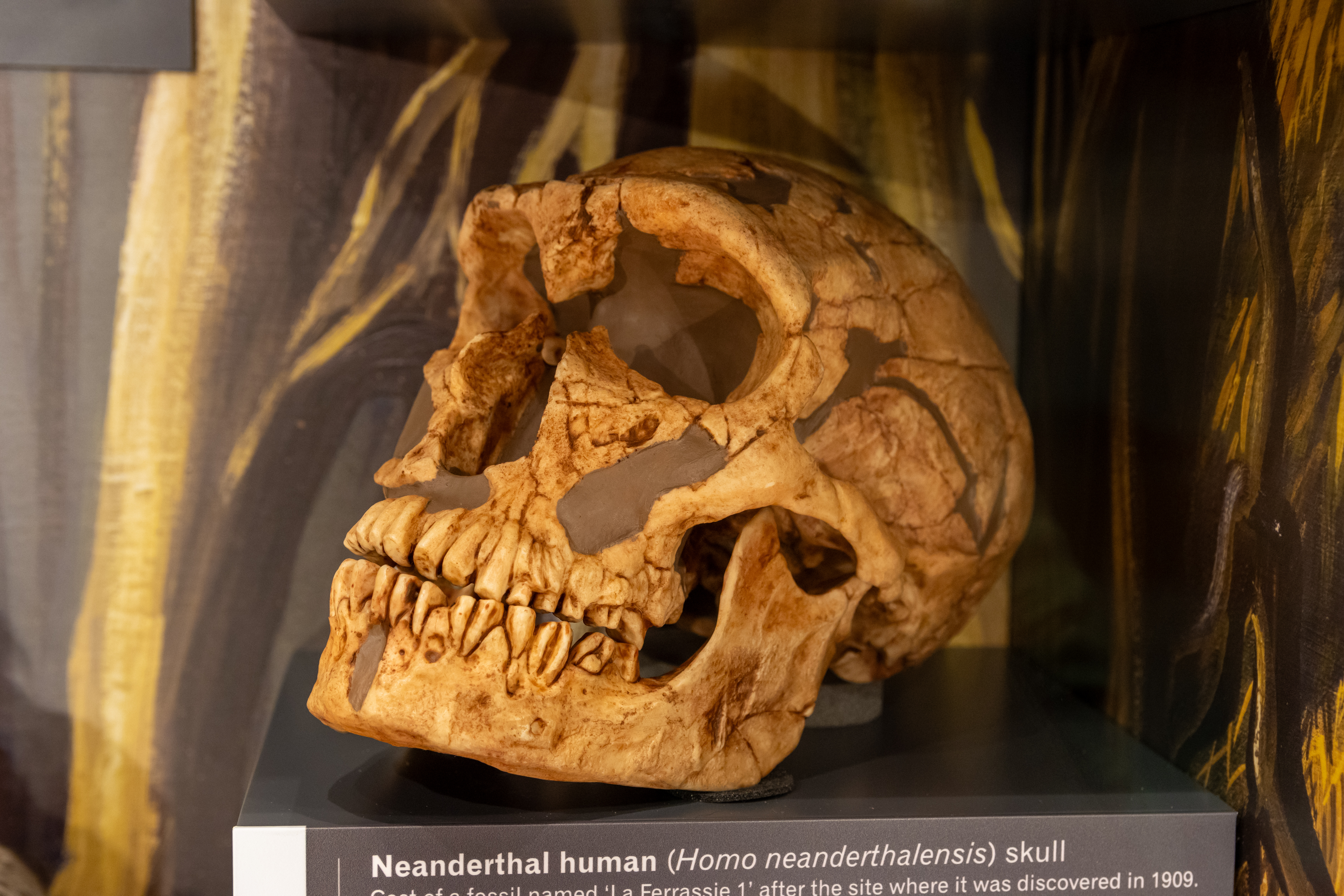
Cast on display at Wollaton Hall

The remains of La Ferrassie 1 were discovered inside of a rock shelter that had collapsed. The discovery took place in Savignac-de-Miremont, near Le Bugue, France. La Ferrassie 1 is one of the many hominid dispersals found in France. Many researchers have reported that the remains of La Ferrassie 1 show characteristics of the Eurasian human population before having contact with anatomically modern humans. These characteristics can be seen throughout the remains of La Ferrrasie 1.

When La Ferrassie 1 was discovered, it was noted that the right side of the skeleton was semi-flexed when buried. This detail would prove to explain the damage that was done to the skeleton. The axial skeleton of La Ferrassie 1 was crushed almost entirely. Nonetheless, the remains have been able to help many researchers in their studies. Most notably, M. Boule used La Ferrassie 1 as a sample and comparison to the LaChapelle-aux-Saints 1 skeleton.

== La Ferrassie 1 teeth ==
There have been many studies done on the teeth of La Ferrassie 1. When looking at the teeth of La Ferrassie 1, one can find extreme wear all along them. John A. Wallace, an Assistant Professor in the Department of Anatomy at Queen's University was the first to ask the question, "Did La Ferrassie 1 use his teeth as a tool?" This question would explain the changes to face shape that followed La Ferrassie 1 and the extreme wear that can be seen. Wallace noted that changing face shape due to teeth use is a case of selective mechanism. This would connect to other transitional changes that have been seen in other discovered Neanderthals. La Ferrassie 1's face shape could prove that they used their teeth as a tool because of their muzzle-shaped face. In the past, the shape of the teeth has been correlated with the shape of the face and jaw. It was also discovered to be placed further forward in comparison to any other human evolution fossil. Pierre-Francois Puech also noted that the cheek teeth were very similar to present-day humans, and La Ferrassie 1 also had a long mandible of 126 mm. La Ferrassie 1 has been noted to represent many transitional characteristics to modern-day humans.

== Hypertrophic pulmonary osteoarthropathy ==
La Ferrassie 1 is also significant because it was found to show periostitis. The clubbed fingers of La Ferrassie 1 should be a clear indication of this case. It is also important to note that La Ferrassie 1 was also discovered to have a case of hypertrophic pulmonary osteoarthropathy, also known as HPO. However, the HPO found in La Ferrassie 1 was most likely not a hand or foot condition. This rare condition makes this fossil even more notable. La Ferrassie 1 is the only Neanderthal found with this diagnosis.

== Possible dating correction ==
A new multi-method luminescence dating has suggested that La Ferrassie 1 could be dated to ~45,000 years ago. This new method of dating could prove to change many Neanderthal sequences. Scientists used the Ferrassie Mousterian layers to support the chronology of La Ferrassie 1. This new chronology could also change the dating of La Ferrassie 2. Results in research have made it clear that La Ferrassie 1 is not any older than 54 ± 4ka.

== See also ==
- Dawn of Humanity (2015 PBS documentary)
- List of fossil sites (with link directory)
- List of Neanderthal fossils
- List of human evolution fossils (with images)
- Neanderthal
- Neanderthals of Gibraltar
- Origins of Us (2011 BBC documentary)
- Prehistoric Autopsy (2012 BBC documentary)
