= Les Farges =

- Commune
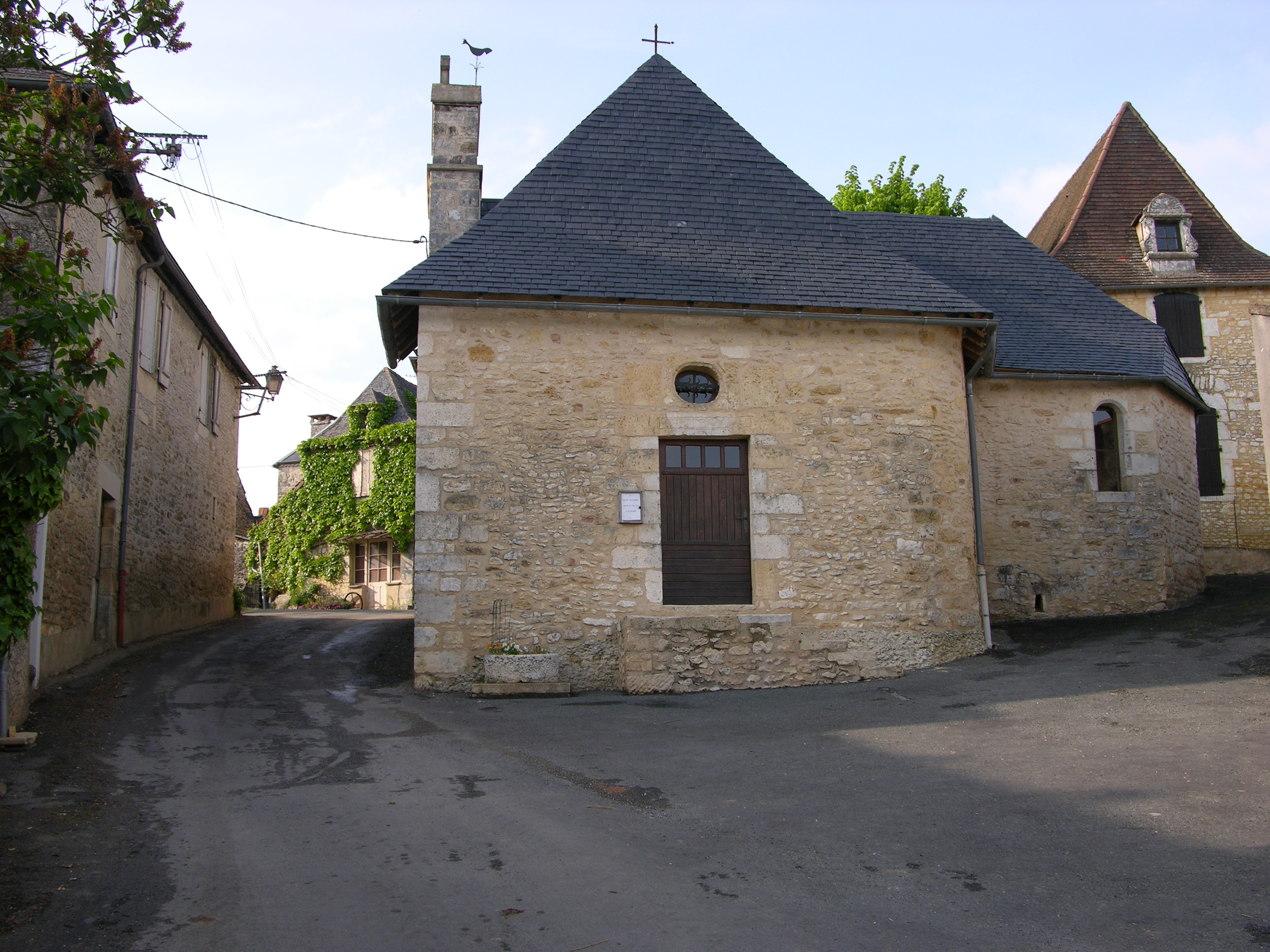
- The chapel in Les Farges
- Location of Les Farges
- Location within France Location within Nouvelle-Aquitaine
- Coordinates: 45°06′58″N 1°11′15″E
- Country: France
- Region: Nouvelle-Aquitaine
- Department: Dordogne
- Arrondissement: Sarlat-la-Canéda
- Canton: Vallée de l'Homme
- Intercommunality: Vallée de l'Homme

Government
  - Mayor (2020–2026): Sylvie Colombel
- Area^{1}: 8.14 km^{2} (3.14 sq mi)
- Elevation: 250 m (820 ft)
- Highest elevation: 267 m (876 ft)
- Lowest elevation: 71 m (233 ft)
- Population (2023): 311
  - Density: 38.2/km^{2} (99.0/sq mi)
- Time zone: UTC+01:00 (CET)
  - Summer (DST): UTC+02:00 (CEST)
- INSEE/Postal code: 24175 /24290
- ^{1} French Land Register data, which excludes lakes, ponds, glaciers > 1 km^{2} (0.386 sq mi or 247 acres) and river estuaries.

Les Farges (French pronunciation: [le faʁʒ]; Occitan: Las Farjas) is a commune in the Dordogne department in Nouvelle-Aquitaine in southwestern France.

== Population ==
Historical population
Year	Pop.	±% p.a.
1968	151	—
1975	159	+0.74%
1982	180	+1.79%
1990	228	+3.00%
1999	262	+1.56%
2007	320	+2.53%
2012	319	−0.06%
2017	319	+0.00%
2023	311	−0.42%
Source: INSEE

== See also ==
- Communes of the Dordogne department
