= La Chapelle-Aubareil =

- Commune
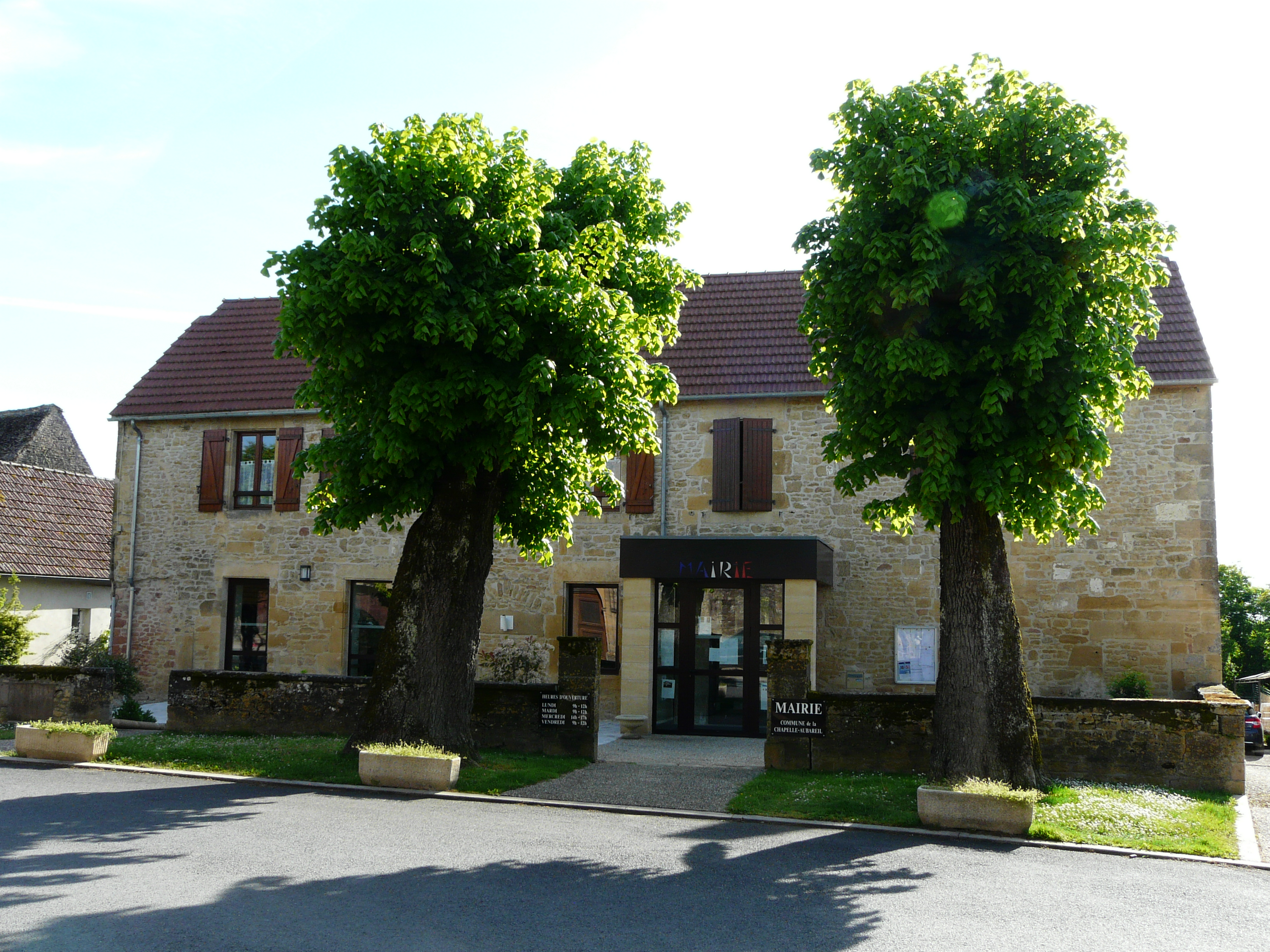
- The town hall in La Chapelle-Aubareil
- Location of La Chapelle-Aubareil
- Location within France Location within Nouvelle-Aquitaine
- Coordinates: 45°00′48″N 1°11′00″E
- Country: France
- Region: Nouvelle-Aquitaine
- Department: Dordogne
- Arrondissement: Sarlat-la-Canéda
- Canton: Vallée de l'Homme

Government
  - Mayor (2020–2026): Jean-Michel Faure
- Area^{1}: 19.85 km^{2} (7.66 sq mi)
- Elevation: 260 m (850 ft)
- Highest elevation: 288 m (945 ft)
- Lowest elevation: 109 m (358 ft)
- Population (2023): 542
  - Density: 27.3/km^{2} (70.7/sq mi)
- Time zone: UTC+01:00 (CET)
  - Summer (DST): UTC+02:00 (CEST)
- INSEE/Postal code: 24106 /24290
- ^{1} French Land Register data, which excludes lakes, ponds, glaciers > 1 km^{2} (0.386 sq mi or 247 acres) and river estuaries.

La Chapelle-Aubareil (French pronunciation: [la ʃapɛl obaʁɛj]; Occitan: La Capèla Albarèlh) is a commune in the Dordogne department in Nouvelle-Aquitaine in southwestern France.

== Population ==
Historical population
Year	Pop.	±% p.a.
1968	333	—
1975	280	−2.45%
1982	308	+1.37%
1990	330	+0.87%
1999	373	+1.37%
2007	450	+2.37%
2012	501	+2.17%
2017	541	+1.55%
2023	542	+0.03%
Source: INSEE

== See also ==
- Communes of the Dordogne department
