= La Ferrassie =

Cave and archaeological site in south-western France

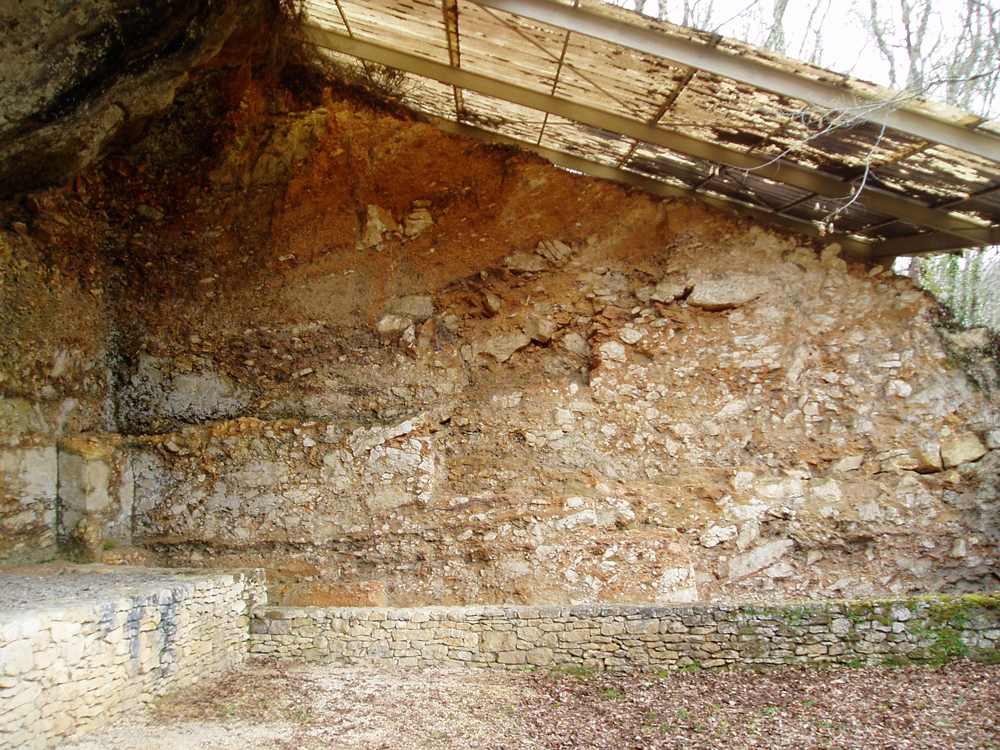
- La Ferrassie

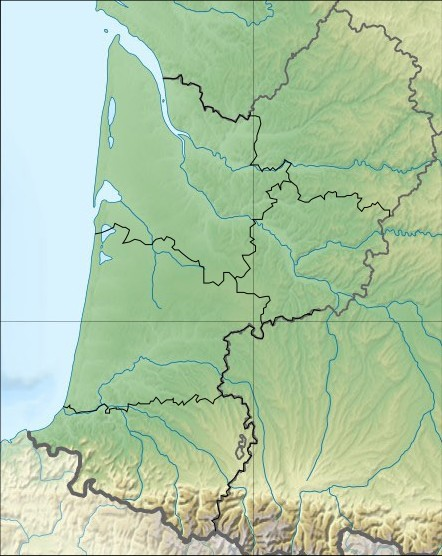
- Location in France La Ferrassie (France) La Ferrassie (Europe)
- 44°57′07″N 0°56′17″E
- Location: near Savignac-de-Miremont
- Region: Dordogne, France

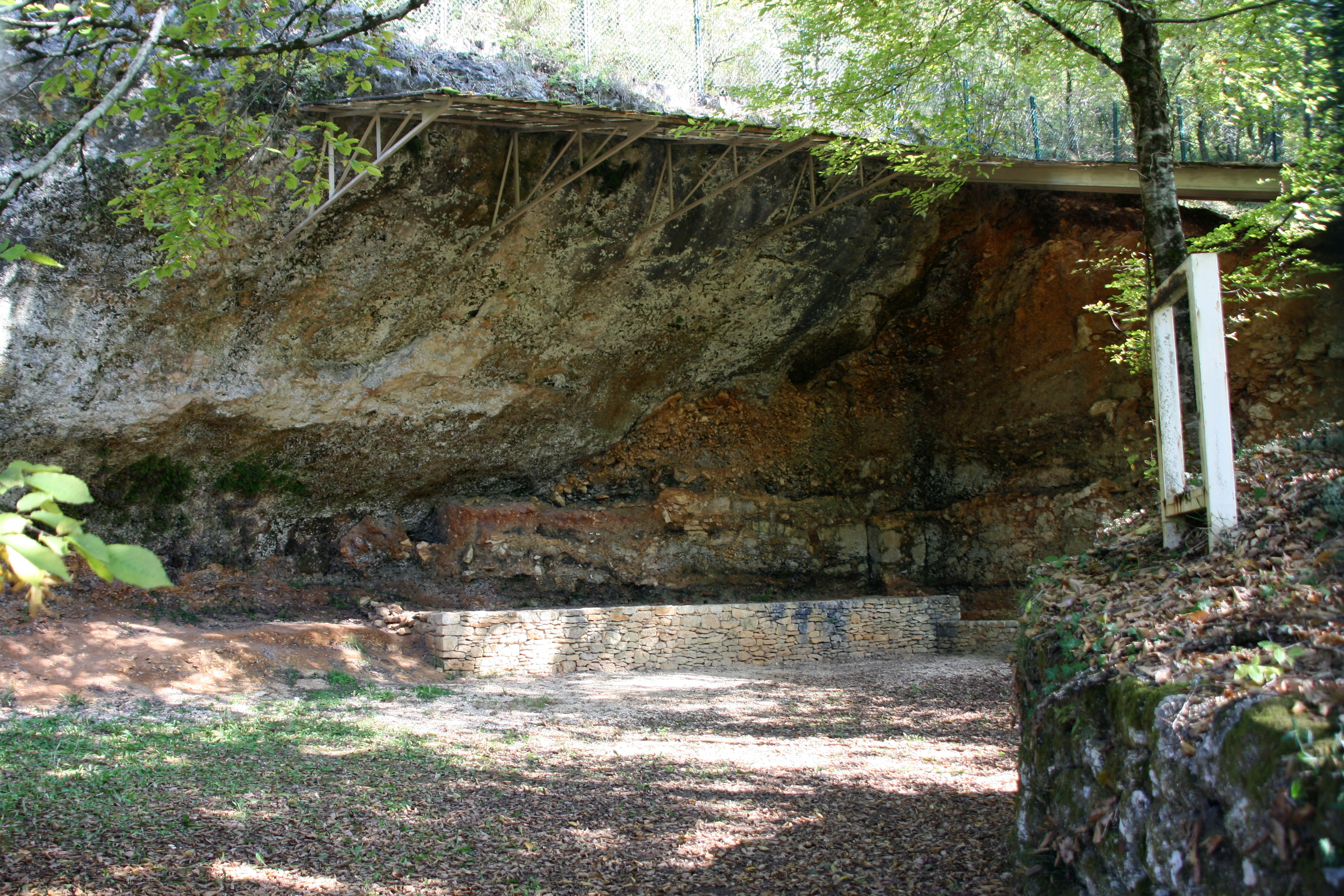

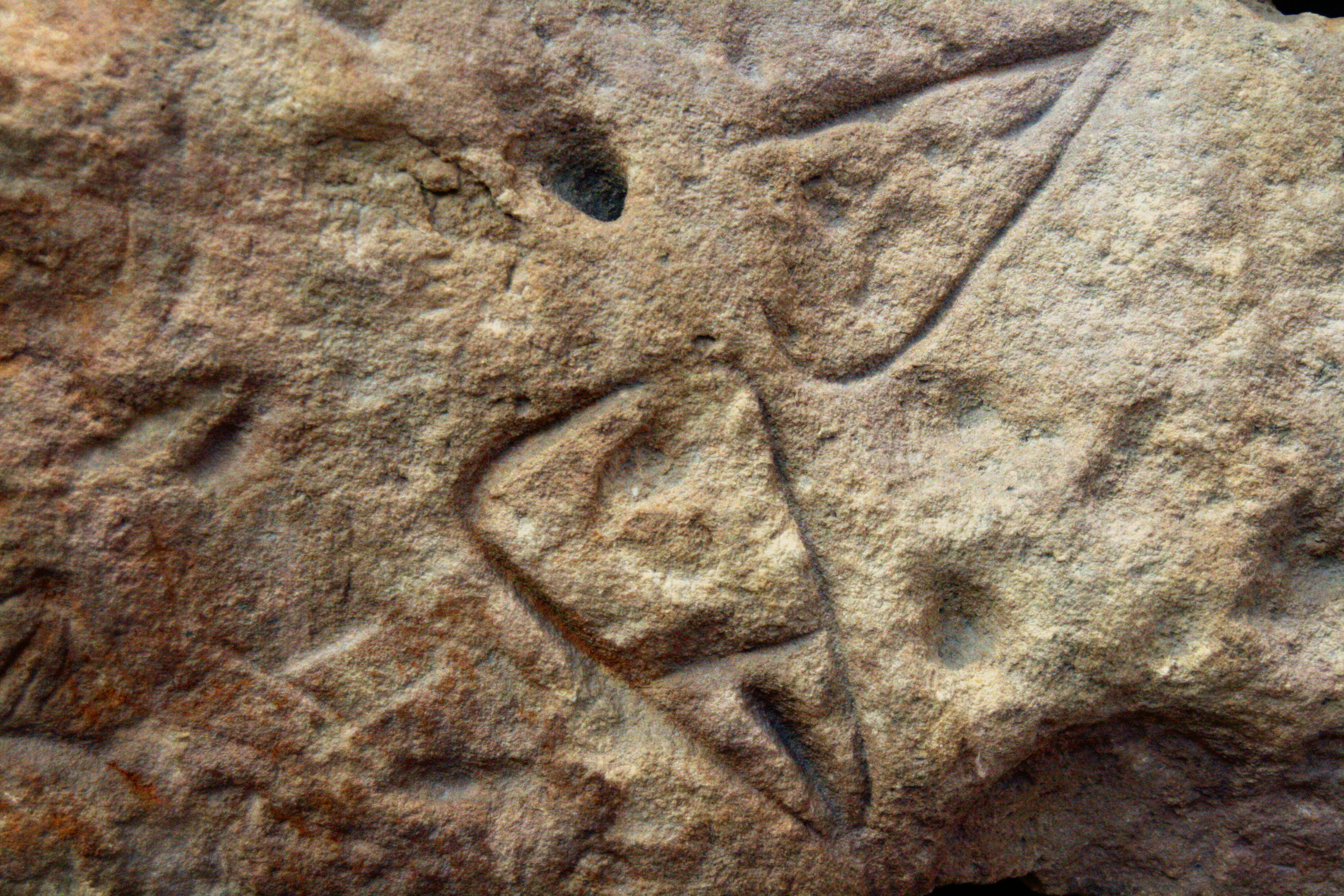
Vulva engraving from the rock shelter

La Ferrassie is an archaeological site in Savignac-de-Miremont, in the Dordogne department, France. The site, located in the Vézère valley, consists of a large and deep cave flanked by two rock shelters within a limestone cliff, under which there is a scree slope formation.

== Age ==
Artifacts found at the site are the productions of Mousterian (300,000-30,000 BP), Aurignacian (45,000–35,000 BP), and Périgordian (35,000–20,000 BP) cultures. The cave area contains Gravettian (32,000–22,000 BP) objects and the scree contains objects from all these ages as well as the Châtelperronian (35,000-29,000 PB). The site was abandoned during the Gravettian period (27 kya). Complex Mousterian burial structures found at La Ferrasie finally provided the evidence of Neanderthal burial practice.

== Exploration history ==
A small area of the site was initially investigated by M. Tabanou in 1896, a teacher who died of a landslide at the Badegoule rock shelter shortly thereafter. Denis Peyrony and Louis Capitan explored the site in 1905, 1907 and 1912; Peyrony in 1934, Henri Delporte in 1969 and 1984, and Delporte with Tuffreau in 1984.

== Fossils ==
At least seven Neanderthals have been found in La Ferrassie, including infants and one fetus. All specimens were found in a thin 60 cm archaeological layer dated to 74-68 thousand years ago.

Name	Develop- mental age	Notes
La Ferrassie 1 ♂	45	The skeleton of an adult male, including the most complete Neanderthal skull ever found. Discovered in 1909.
La Ferrassie 2 ♀	25–30	An incomplete cranium and skeleton of a female Neanderthal found in 1910 and dated to 68–74,000 before present. This is now kept in the Musée de l'Homme.
La Ferrassie 3	10	A partial child skeleton.
La Ferrassie 4	8.5 months (fetal age)	The bones of a late-term fetus or of a newborn. Now thought to belong to Le Moustier 2.
La Ferrassie 4bis	~12 days	A partial child skeleton.
La Ferrassie 5	~7 months (fetal age)	Fetus
La Ferrassie 6	3–5	Nearly complete skeleton of a juvenile discovered in 1921.
"La Ferrassie 7"	–	A talus bone named LF7 by Boule (1924), who thought despite its small size that it represented a third adult. Now thought part of La Ferrassie 3.
La Ferrassie 8	22–26 months	Young child with well-preserved teeth.
