= Aubas =

- Commune
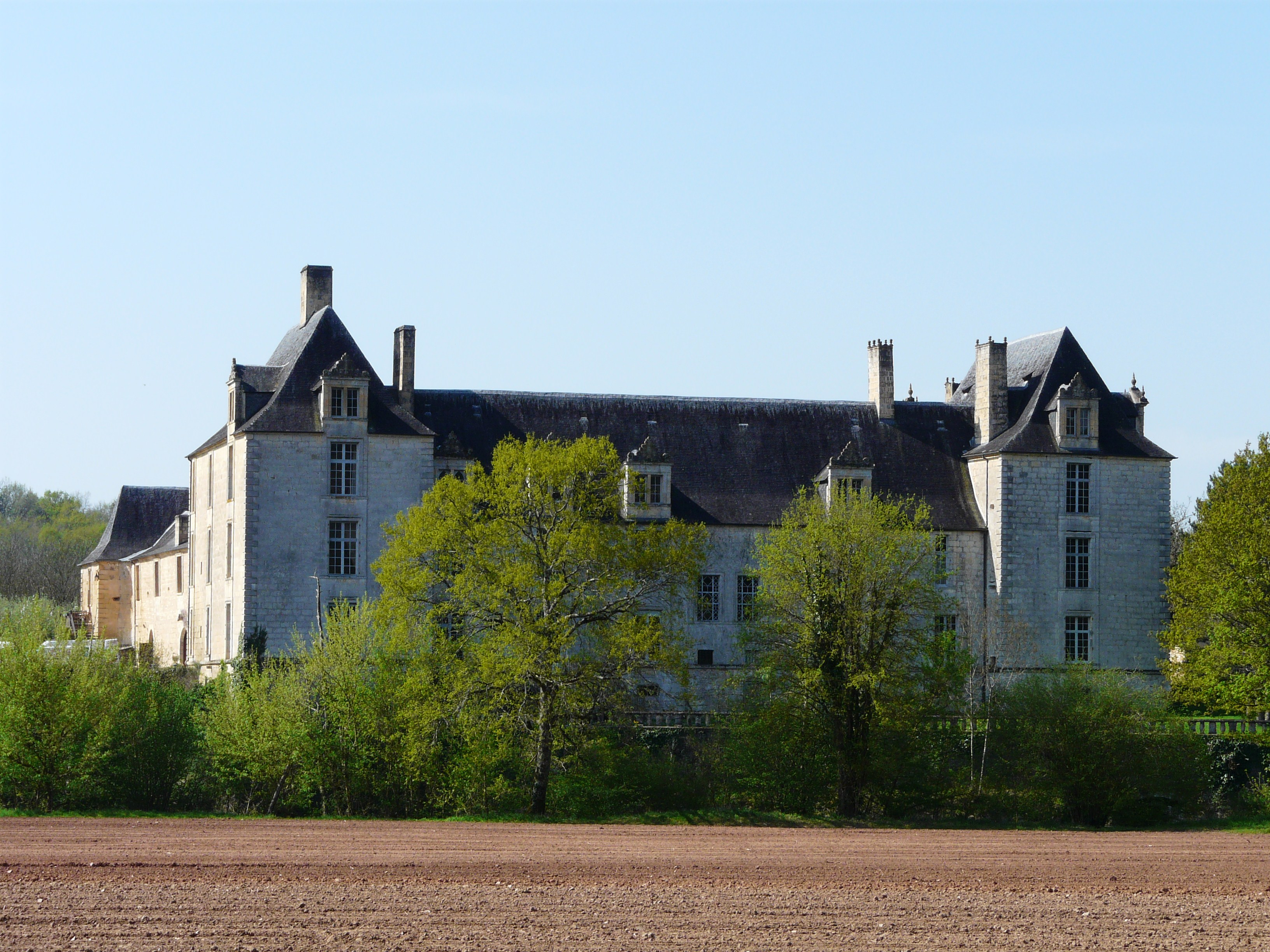
- Château de Sauvebœuf
- Location of Aubas
- Location within France Location within Nouvelle-Aquitaine
- Coordinates: 45°04′56″N 1°11′30″E
- Country: France
- Region: Nouvelle-Aquitaine
- Department: Dordogne
- Arrondissement: Sarlat-la-Canéda
- Canton: Vallée de l'Homme
- Intercommunality: CC Vallée de l'Homme

Government
  - Mayor (2020–2026): Valène Dupuy
- Area^{1}: 17.53 km^{2} (6.77 sq mi)
- Elevation: 75 m (246 ft)
- Highest elevation: 255 m (837 ft)
- Lowest elevation: 68 m (223 ft)
- Population (2023): 614
  - Density: 35.0/km^{2} (90.7/sq mi)
- Time zone: UTC+01:00 (CET)
  - Summer (DST): UTC+02:00 (CEST)
- INSEE/Postal code: 24014 /24290
- ^{1} French Land Register data, which excludes lakes, ponds, glaciers > 1 km^{2} (0.386 sq mi or 247 acres) and river estuaries.

Aubas (French pronunciation: [obas]; Occitan: Aubàs) is a commune in the Dordogne department in Nouvelle-Aquitaine in southwestern France.

== Population ==
Historical population
Year	Pop.	±% p.a.
1968	348	—
1975	348	+0.00%
1982	395	+1.83%
1990	458	+1.87%
1999	488	+0.71%
2007	601	+2.64%
2012	627	+0.85%
2017	609	−0.58%
2023	614	+0.14%
Source: INSEE

== See also ==
- Communes of the Dordogne department
