= Saint-Léon-sur-Vézère =

- Commune
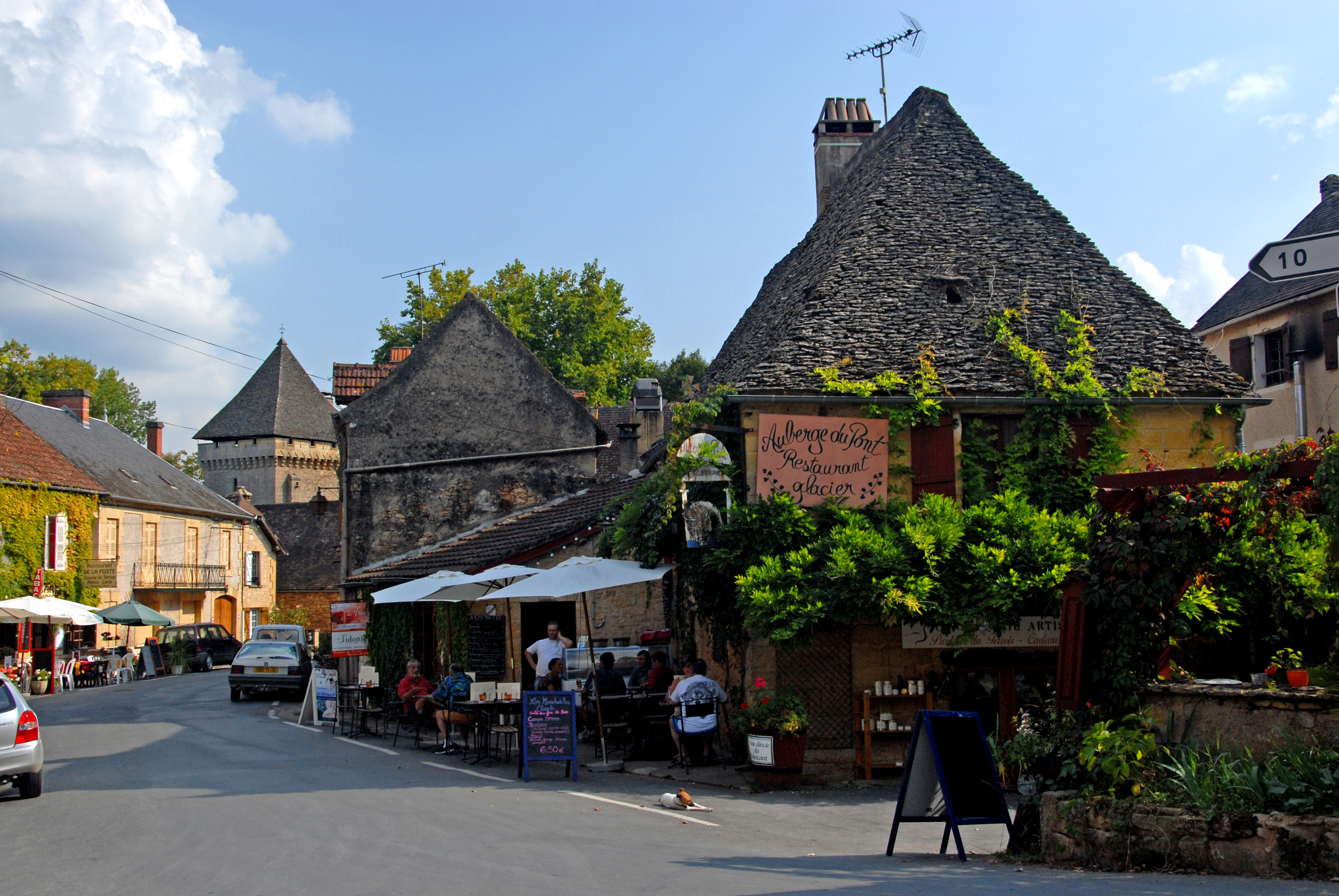
- The high street in Saint-Léon-sur-Vézère

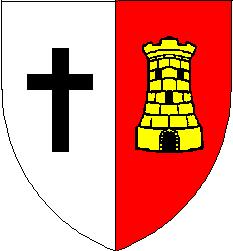
- Coat of arms
- Location of Saint-Léon-sur-Vézère
- Location within France Location within Nouvelle-Aquitaine
- Coordinates: 45°00′41″N 1°05′22″E
- Country: France
- Region: Nouvelle-Aquitaine
- Department: Dordogne
- Arrondissement: Sarlat-la-Canéda
- Canton: Vallée de l'Homme

Government
  - Mayor (2020–2026): Yannick Dalbavie
- Area^{1}: 13.76 km^{2} (5.31 sq mi)
- Elevation: 70 m (230 ft)
- Highest elevation: 260 m (850 ft)
- Lowest elevation: 62 m (203 ft)
- Population (2023): 431
  - Density: 31.3/km^{2} (81.1/sq mi)
- Time zone: UTC+01:00 (CET)
  - Summer (DST): UTC+02:00 (CEST)
- INSEE/Postal code: 24443 /24290
- ^{1} French Land Register data, which excludes lakes, ponds, glaciers > 1 km^{2} (0.386 sq mi or 247 acres) and river estuaries.

Saint-Léon-sur-Vézère (French pronunciation: [sɛ̃ leɔ̃ syʁ vezɛʁ], literally Saint-Léon on Vézère; Occitan: Sent Leu de Vesera) is a commune in the Dordogne department in Nouvelle-Aquitaine in southwestern France. It is a member of Les Plus Beaux Villages de France (The Most Beautiful Villages of France) Association.

== Population ==
Historical population
Year	Pop.	±% p.a.
1968	345	—
1975	334	−0.46%
1982	390	+2.24%
1990	427	+1.14%
1999	419	−0.21%
2007	429	+0.30%
2012	420	−0.42%
2017	425	+0.24%
2023	431	+0.23%
Source: INSEE

== Views ==
Views of Saint-Léon-sur-Vézère

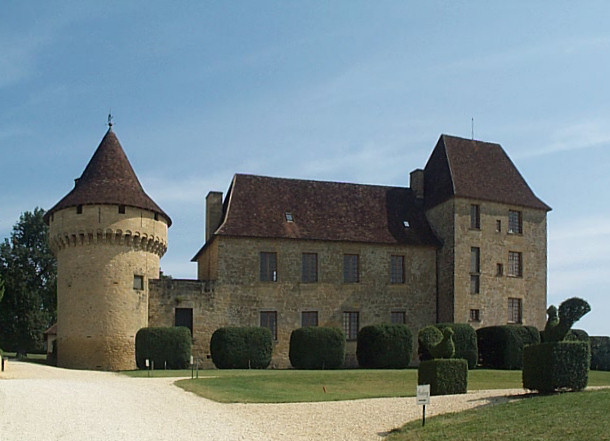

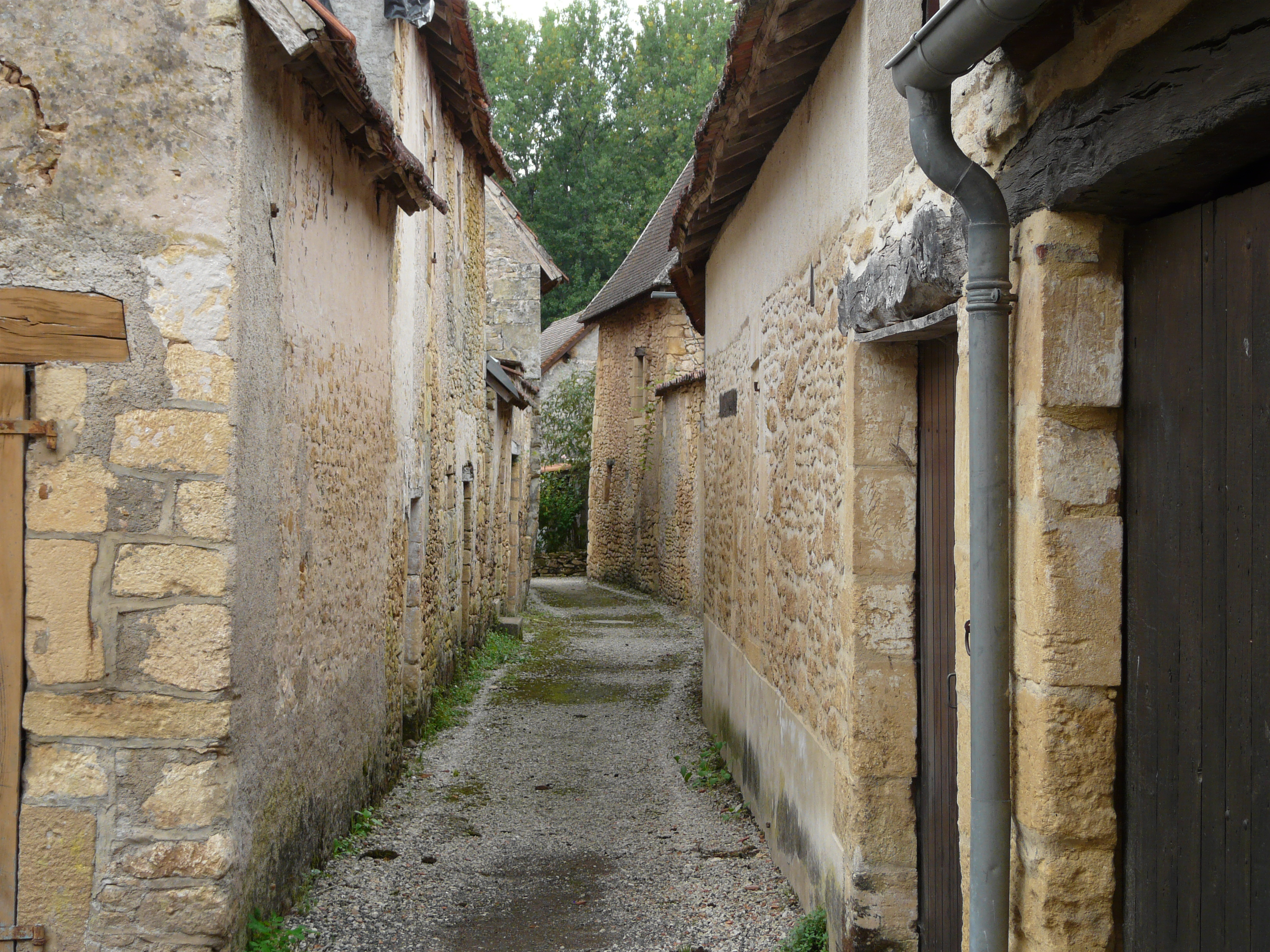

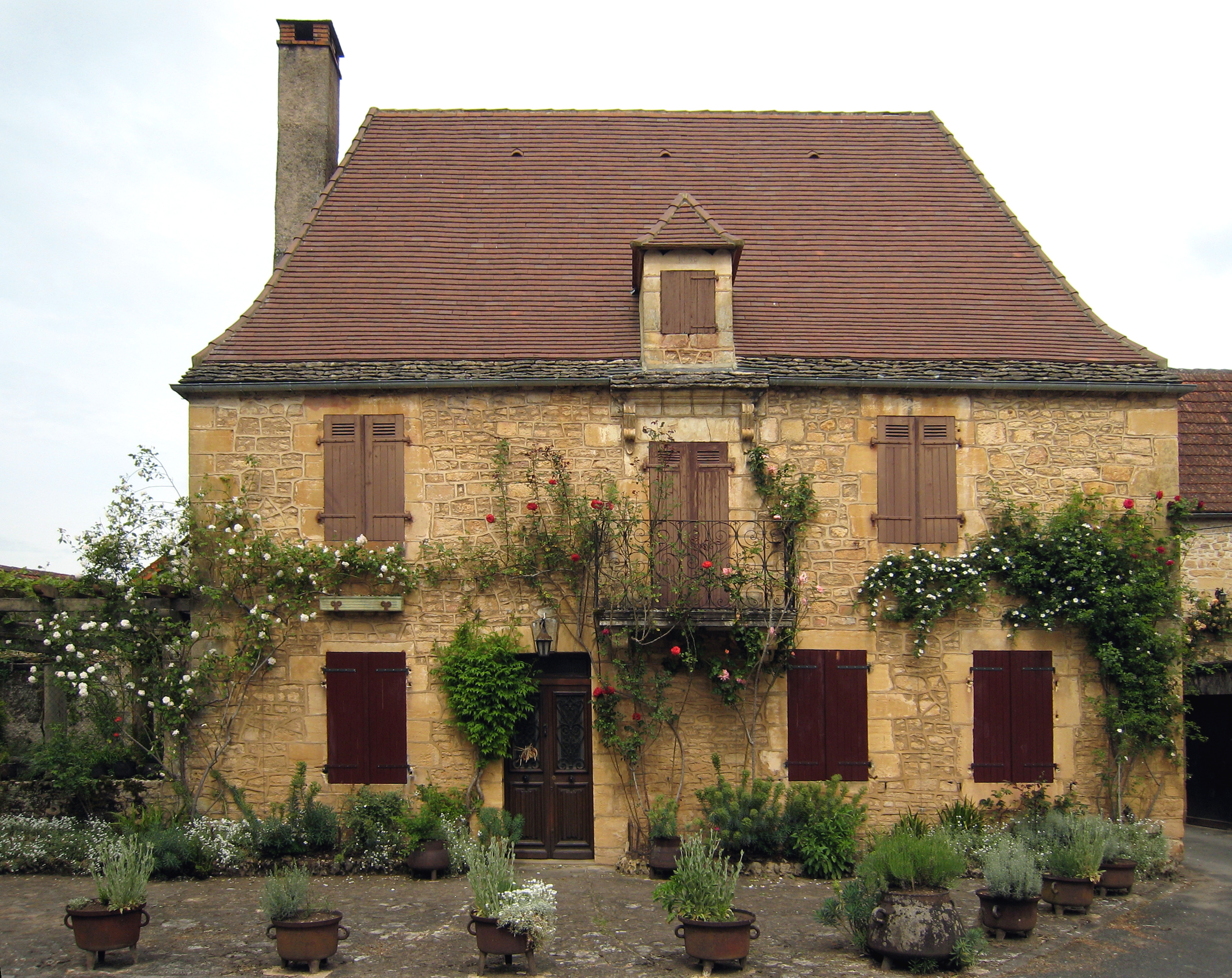

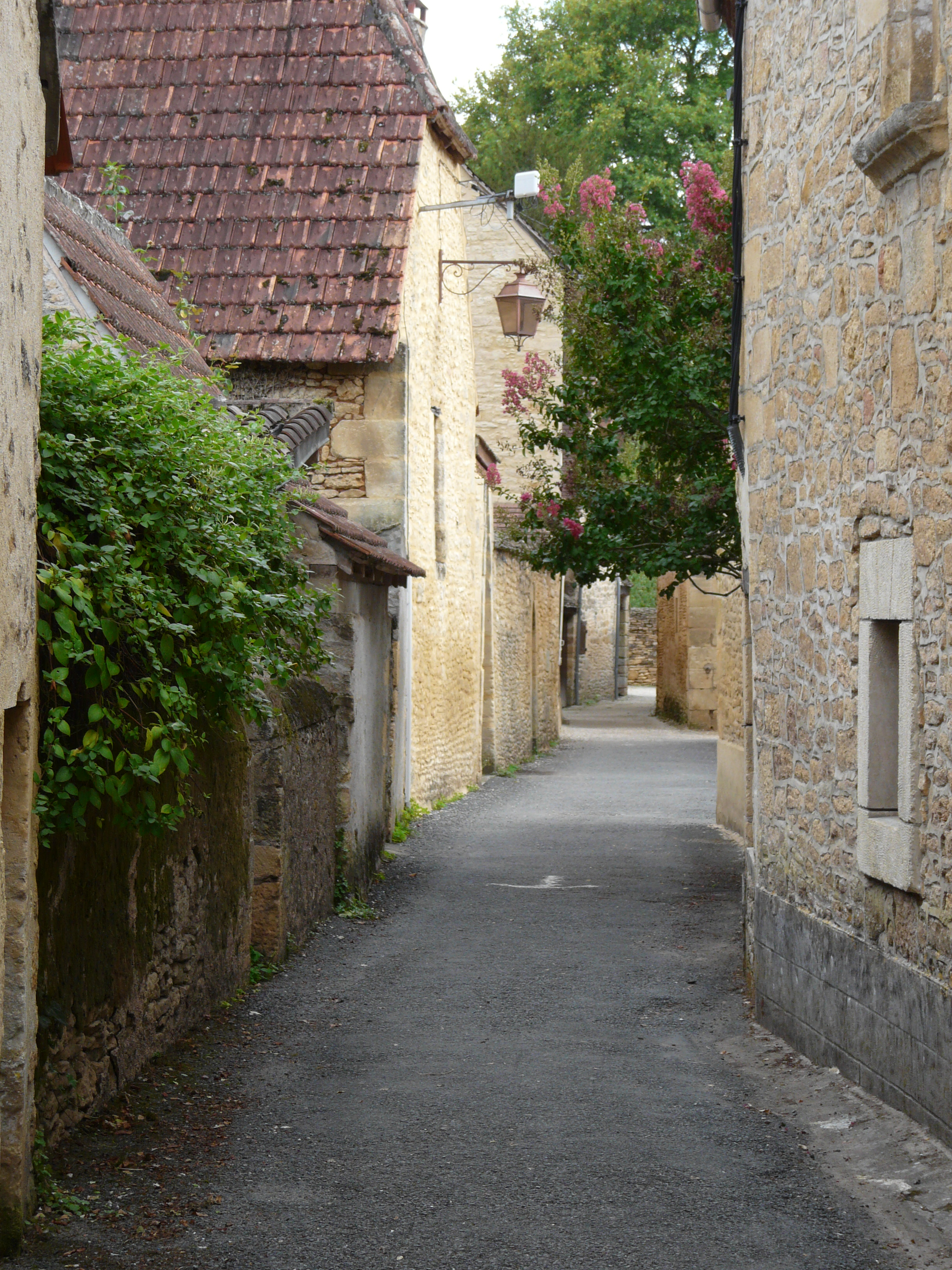

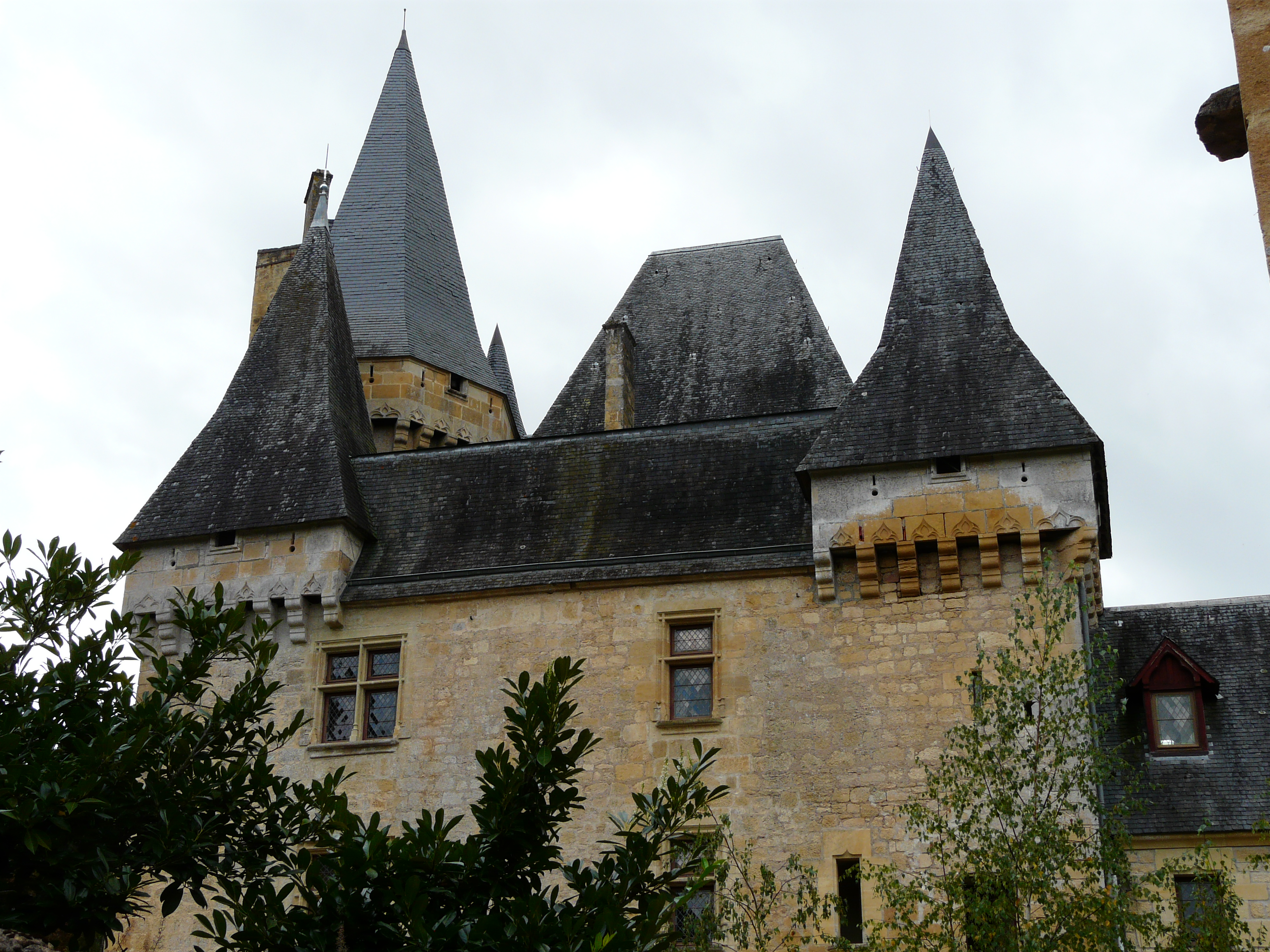

== See also ==
- Communes of the Dordogne department
