= Valojoulx =

- Commune
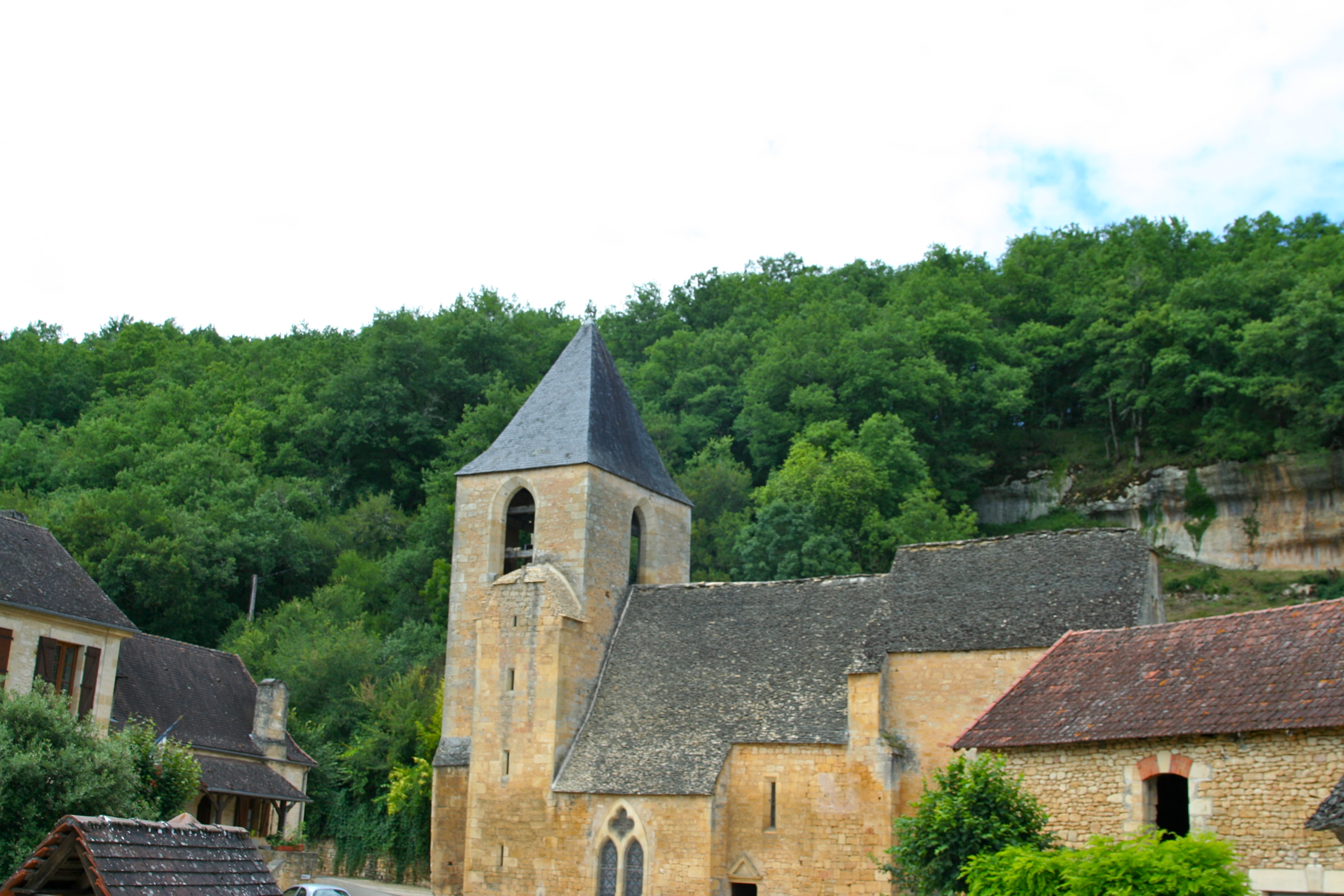
- The church and surroundings in Valojoulx
- Location of Valojoulx
- Location within France Location within Nouvelle-Aquitaine
- Coordinates: 45°01′07″N 1°08′35″E
- Country: France
- Region: Nouvelle-Aquitaine
- Department: Dordogne
- Arrondissement: Sarlat-la-Canéda
- Canton: Vallée de l'Homme

Government
  - Mayor (2020–2026): Nathalie Manet-Carbonnière
- Area^{1}: 11.79 km^{2} (4.55 sq mi)
- Elevation: 97 m (318 ft)
- Highest elevation: 266 m (873 ft)
- Lowest elevation: 72 m (236 ft)
- Population (2023): 285
  - Density: 24.2/km^{2} (62.6/sq mi)
- Time zone: UTC+01:00 (CET)
  - Summer (DST): UTC+02:00 (CEST)
- INSEE/Postal code: 24563 /24290
- ^{1} French Land Register data, which excludes lakes, ponds, glaciers > 1 km^{2} (0.386 sq mi or 247 acres) and river estuaries.

Valojoulx (French pronunciation: [valɔʒu]; Occitan: Valaujors) is a commune in the Dordogne department in Nouvelle-Aquitaine in southwestern France.

== Population ==
Historical population
Year	Pop.	±% p.a.
1968	185	—
1975	172	−1.04%
1982	183	+0.89%
1990	197	+0.93%
1999	208	+0.61%
2007	244	+2.02%
2012	273	+2.27%
2017	271	−0.15%
2023	285	+0.84%
Source: INSEE

== See also ==
- Communes of the Dordogne department
