= Saint-Avit-de-Vialard =

- Commune
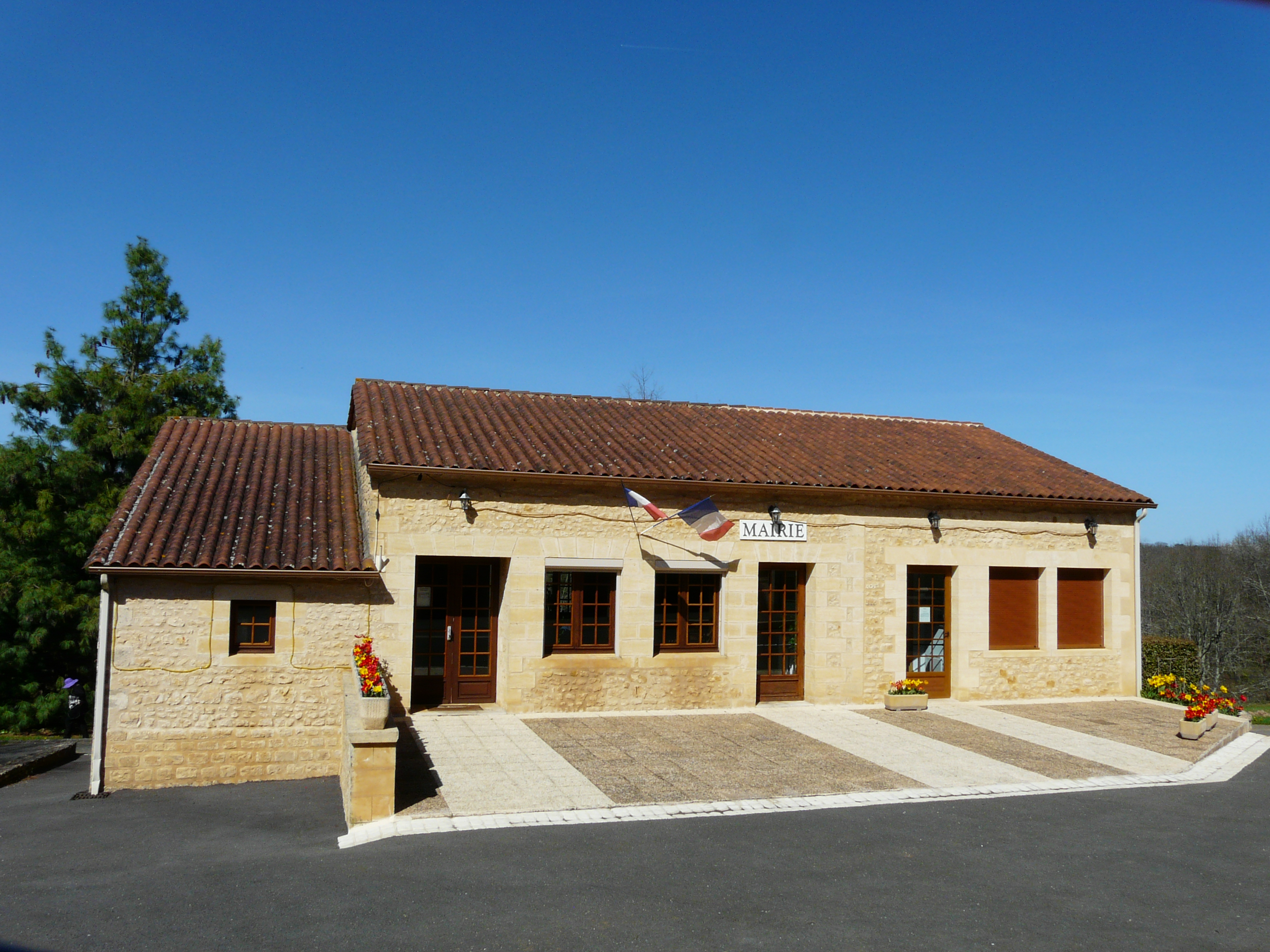
- The town hall in Saint-Avit-de-Vialard

- Coat of arms
- Location of Saint-Avit-de-Vialard
- Location within France Location within Nouvelle-Aquitaine
- Coordinates: 44°56′38″N 0°52′10″E
- Country: France
- Region: Nouvelle-Aquitaine
- Department: Dordogne
- Arrondissement: Sarlat-la-Canéda
- Canton: Vallée de l'Homme

Government
  - Mayor (2020–2026): Jean Paul Dubos
- Area^{1}: 8.45 km^{2} (3.26 sq mi)
- Elevation: 215 m (705 ft)
- Highest elevation: 251 m (823 ft)
- Lowest elevation: 113 m (371 ft)
- Population (2023): 152
  - Density: 18.0/km^{2} (46.6/sq mi)
- Time zone: UTC+01:00 (CET)
  - Summer (DST): UTC+02:00 (CEST)
- INSEE/Postal code: 24377 /24260
- ^{1} French Land Register data, which excludes lakes, ponds, glaciers > 1 km^{2} (0.386 sq mi or 247 acres) and river estuaries.

Saint-Avit-de-Vialard (French pronunciation: [sɛ̃.t‿avi də vjalaʁ]; Occitan: Sench Avit de Vialars) is a commune in the Dordogne department in Nouvelle-Aquitaine in southwestern France.

== Population ==
Historical population
Year	Pop.	±% p.a.
1968	107	—
1975	90	−2.44%
1982	100	+1.52%
1990	113	+1.54%
1999	118	+0.48%
2007	139	+2.07%
2012	160	+2.85%
2017	160	+0.00%
2023	152	−0.85%
Source: INSEE

== See also ==
- Communes of the Dordogne department
