= Journiac =

- Commune
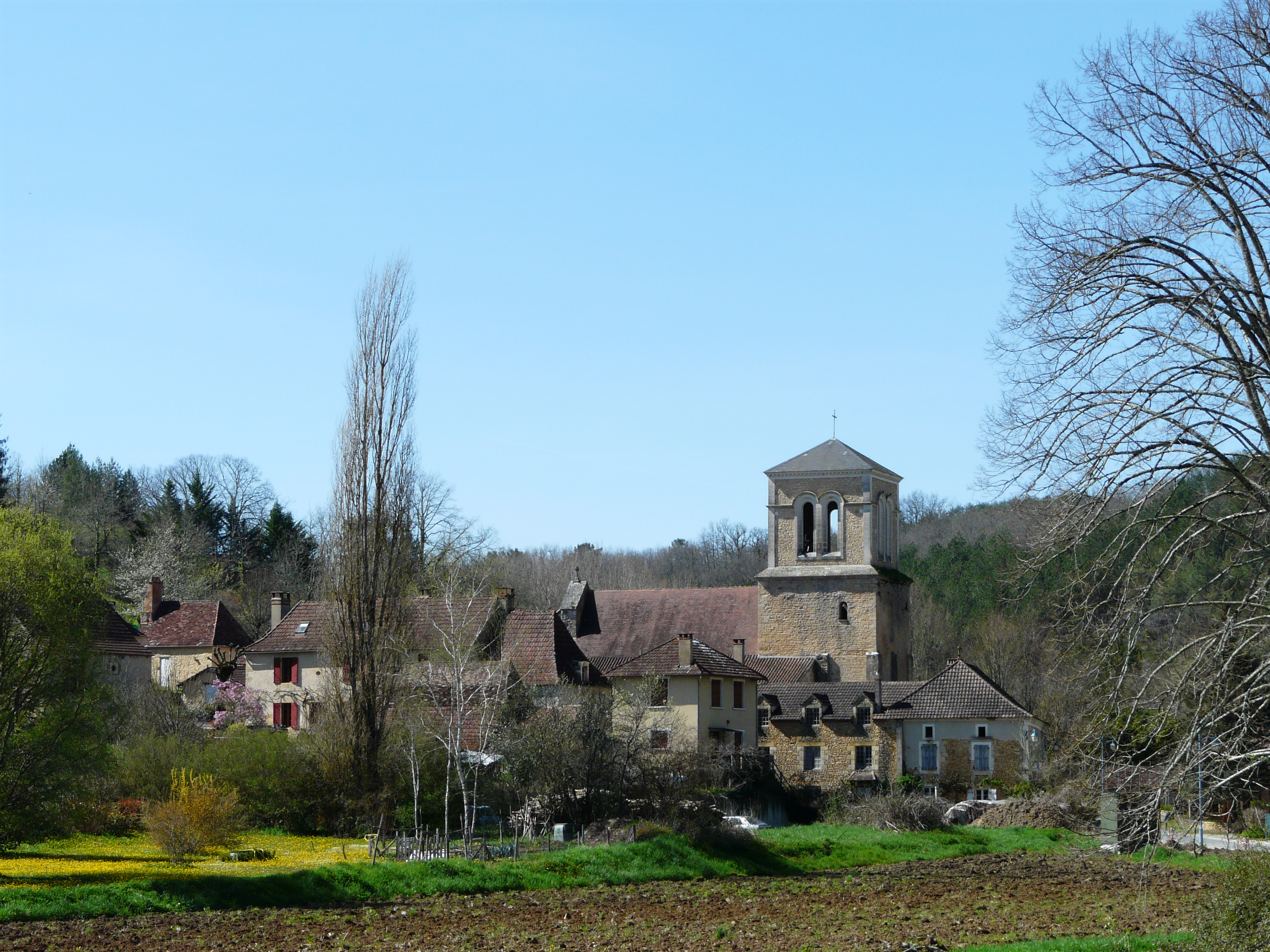
- A general view of Journiac

- Coat of arms
- Location of Journiac
- Location within France Location within Nouvelle-Aquitaine
- Coordinates: 44°57′59″N 0°53′03″E
- Country: France
- Region: Nouvelle-Aquitaine
- Department: Dordogne
- Arrondissement: Sarlat-la-Canéda
- Canton: Vallée de l'Homme

Government
  - Mayor (2023–2026): Jean-Louis Teulet
- Area^{1}: 18.88 km^{2} (7.29 sq mi)
- Elevation: 126 m (413 ft)
- Highest elevation: 254 m (833 ft)
- Lowest elevation: 85 m (279 ft)
- Population (2023): 496
  - Density: 26.3/km^{2} (68.0/sq mi)
- Time zone: UTC+01:00 (CET)
  - Summer (DST): UTC+02:00 (CEST)
- INSEE/Postal code: 24217 /24260
- ^{1} French Land Register data, which excludes lakes, ponds, glaciers > 1 km^{2} (0.386 sq mi or 247 acres) and river estuaries.

Journiac (French pronunciation: [ʒuʁnjak]; Occitan: Jornhac) is a commune in the Dordogne department in Nouvelle-Aquitaine in southwestern France.

== Population ==
Historical population
Year	Pop.	±% p.a.
1968	309	—
1975	276	−1.60%
1982	305	+1.44%
1990	345	+1.55%
1999	365	+0.63%
2007	404	+1.28%
2012	441	+1.77%
2017	437	−0.18%
2023	496	+2.13%
Source: INSEE

== See also ==
- Communes of the Dordogne department
