= Saint-Félix-de-Reillac-et-Mortemart =

- Commune
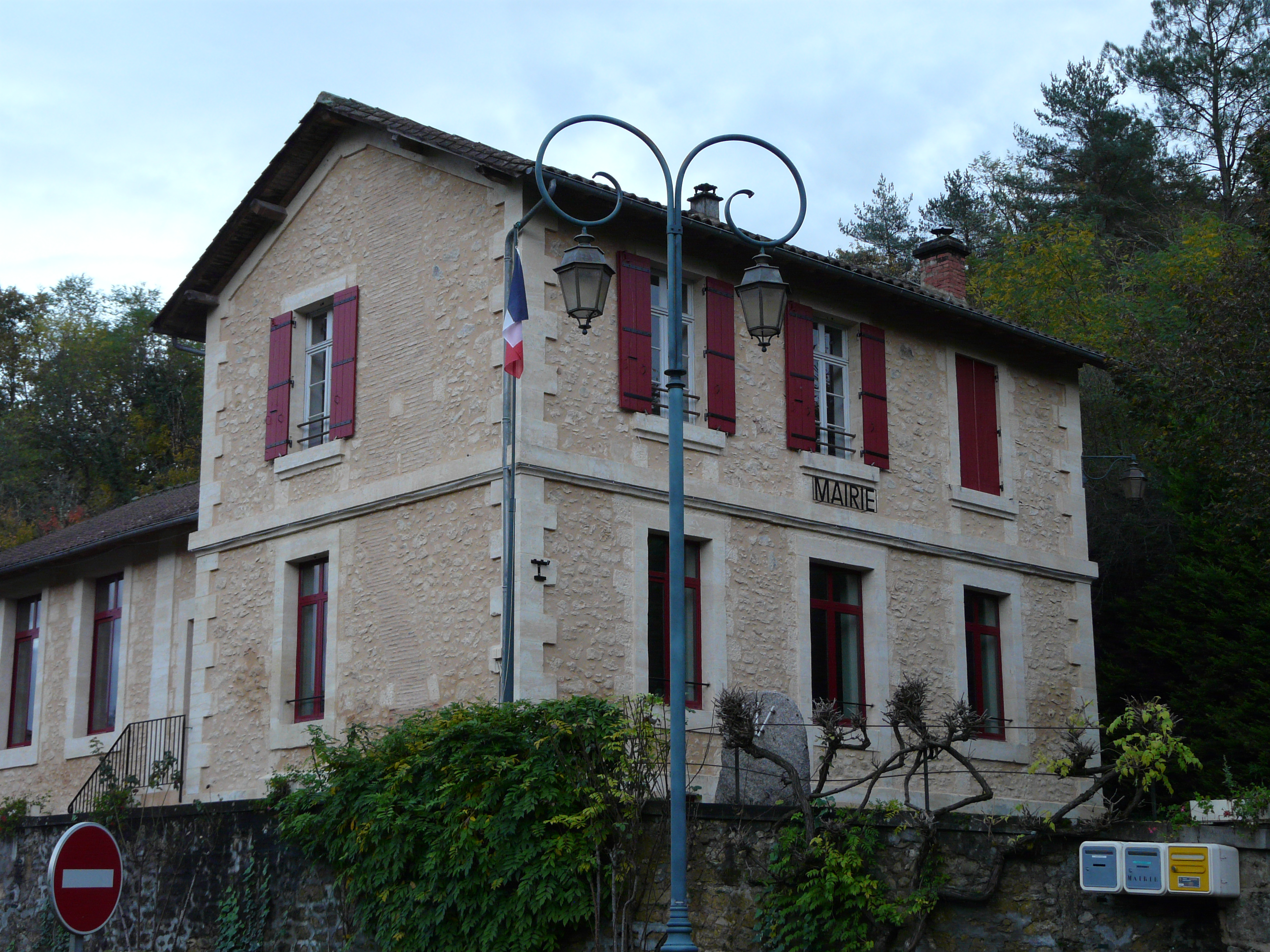
- The town hall in Saint-Félix-de-Reillac-et-Mortemart
- Location of Saint-Félix-de-Reillac-et-Mortemart
- Location within France Location within Nouvelle-Aquitaine
- Coordinates: 45°01′15″N 0°54′57″E
- Country: France
- Region: Nouvelle-Aquitaine
- Department: Dordogne
- Arrondissement: Sarlat-la-Canéda
- Canton: Vallée de l'Homme

Government
  - Mayor (2020–2026): Jean-François Autefort
- Area^{1}: 20.31 km^{2} (7.84 sq mi)
- Elevation: 160 m (520 ft)
- Highest elevation: 267 m (876 ft)
- Lowest elevation: 130 m (430 ft)
- Population (2023): 180
  - Density: 8.9/km^{2} (23/sq mi)
- Time zone: UTC+01:00 (CET)
  - Summer (DST): UTC+02:00 (CEST)
- INSEE/Postal code: 24404 /24260
- ^{1} French Land Register data, which excludes lakes, ponds, glaciers > 1 km^{2} (0.386 sq mi or 247 acres) and river estuaries.

Saint-Félix-de-Reillac-et-Mortemart (French pronunciation: [sɛ̃ feliks də ʁɛjak e mɔʁtəmaʁ]; Languedocien: Sent Feliç de Relhac e Mòrtamar) is a commune in the Dordogne department in Nouvelle-Aquitaine in southwestern France.

It results from the merger of the communes of Saint-Félix-de-Reillac and Mortemart, in 1827.

== Population ==
Historical population
Year	Pop.	±% p.a.
1968	192	—
1975	188	−0.30%
1982	201	+0.96%
1990	194	−0.44%
1999	214	+1.10%
2007	196	−1.09%
2012	204	+0.80%
2017	184	−2.04%
2023	180	−0.37%
Source: INSEE

== See also ==
- Communes of the Dordogne department
