= Fleurac, Dordogne =

Fleurac
- Commune
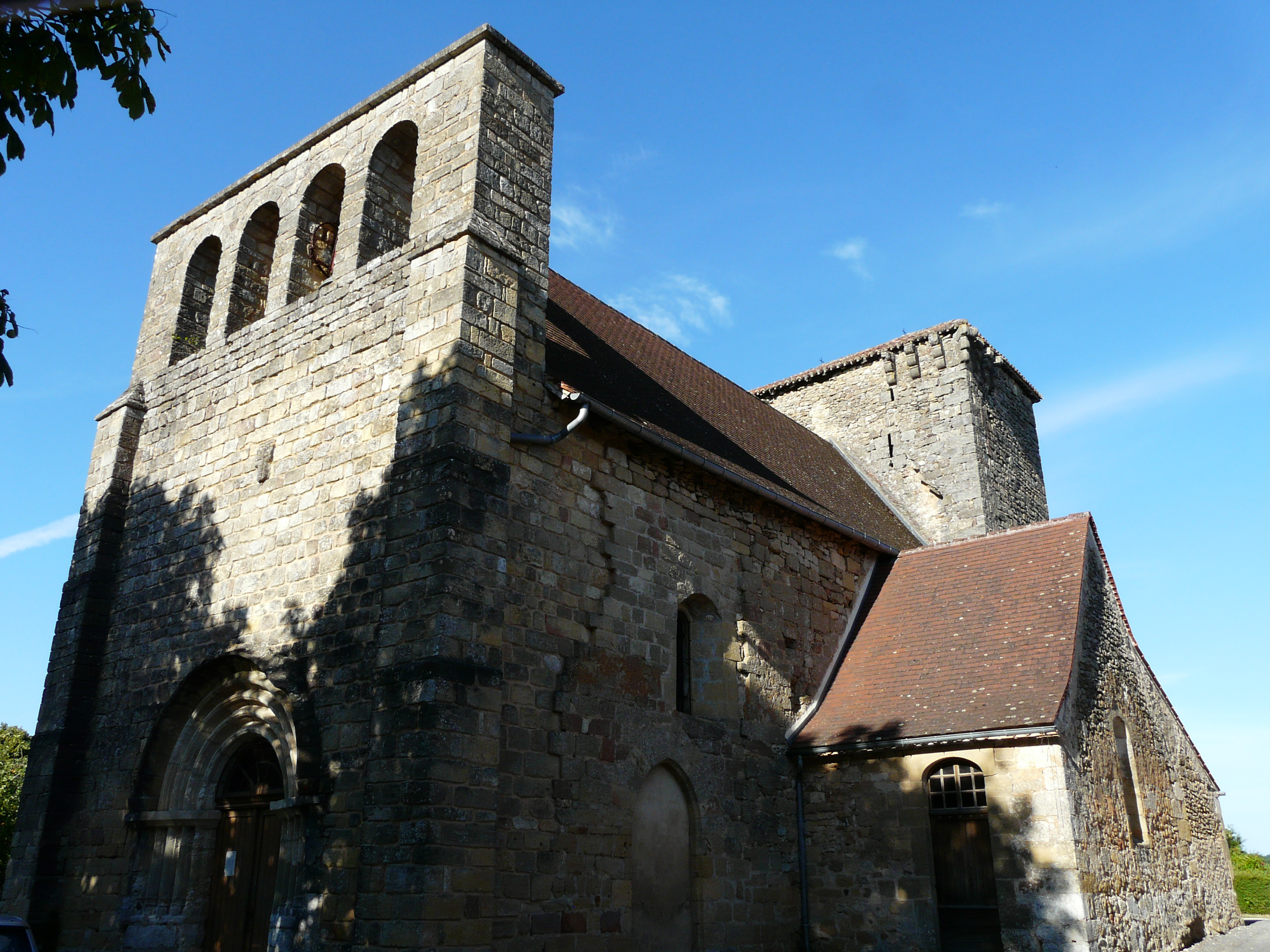
- The church in Fleurac

- Coat of arms
- Location of Fleurac
- Location within France Location within Nouvelle-Aquitaine
- Coordinates: 45°00′31″N 1°00′09″E
- Country: France
- Region: Nouvelle-Aquitaine
- Department: Dordogne
- Arrondissement: Sarlat-la-Canéda
- Canton: Vallée de l'Homme

Government
  - Mayor (2020–2026): Jean-Paul Bouet
- Area^{1}: 22.18 km^{2} (8.56 sq mi)
- Elevation: 256 m (840 ft)
- Highest elevation: 281 m (922 ft)
- Lowest elevation: 72 m (236 ft)
- Population (2023): 328
  - Density: 14.8/km^{2} (38.3/sq mi)
- Time zone: UTC+01:00 (CET)
  - Summer (DST): UTC+02:00 (CEST)
- INSEE/Postal code: 24183 /24580
- ^{1} French Land Register data, which excludes lakes, ponds, glaciers > 1 km^{2} (0.386 sq mi or 247 acres) and river estuaries.

Fleurac (French pronunciation: [flœʁak]; Occitan: Flurac) is a commune in the Dordogne department in Nouvelle-Aquitaine in southwestern France.

== Population ==
Historical population
Year	Pop.	±% p.a.
1968	285	—
1975	239	−2.48%
1982	219	−1.24%
1990	220	+0.06%
1999	221	+0.05%
2007	277	+2.86%
2012	239	−2.91%
2017	244	+0.41%
2023	328	+5.05%
Source: INSEE

== See also ==
- Communes of the Dordogne department
