= Canton of Vallée de l'Homme =

Coordinates: 45.07°N 1.16°E

The canton of Vallée de l'Homme (French pronunciation: [vale də lɔm], lit. 'Valley of Mankind') is an administrative division of the Dordogne department, southwestern France. It was created at the French canton reorganisation which came into effect in March 2015. Its seat is in Montignac-Lascaux.

It consists of the following communes:

1. Aubas
2. Le Bugue
3. Campagne
4. La Chapelle-Aubareil
5. Coly-Saint-Amand
6. Les Eyzies
7. Fanlac
8. Les Farges
9. Fleurac
10. Journiac
11. Mauzens-et-Miremont
12. Montignac-Lascaux
13. Peyzac-le-Moustier
14. Plazac
15. Rouffignac-Saint-Cernin-de-Reilhac
16. Saint-Avit-de-Vialard
17. Saint-Chamassy
18. Saint-Félix-de-Reillac-et-Mortemart
19. Saint-Léon-sur-Vézère
20. Savignac-de-Miremont
21. Sergeac
22. Thonac
23. Tursac
24. Valojoulx
