= Château de Sauvebœuf (Aubas) =

Château in Nouvelle-Aquitaine, France

Coordinates: 45°05′42″N 1°11′55″E

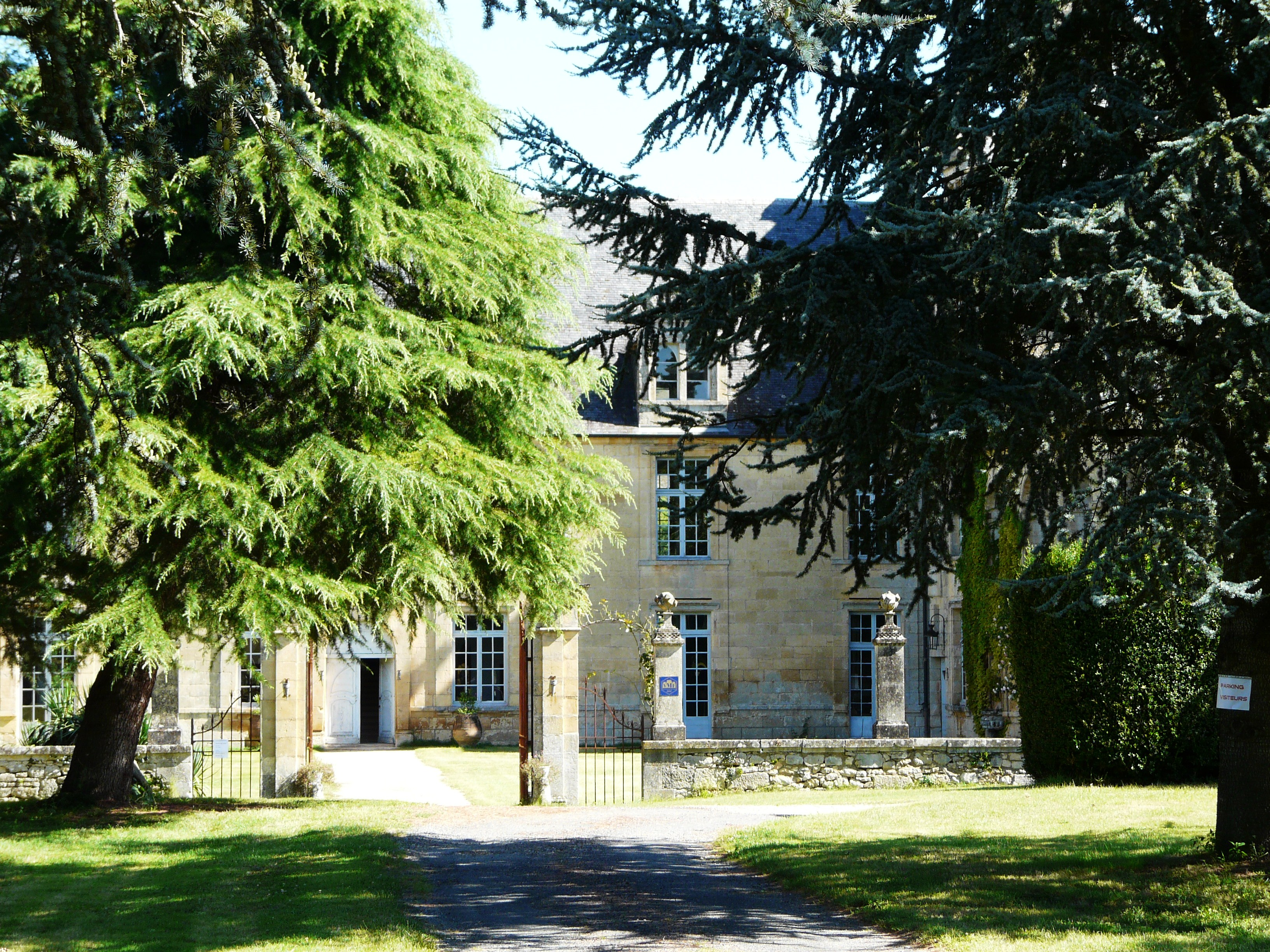
Château de Sauvebœuf

The Château de Sauvebœuf (French pronunciation: [ʃato də sovbœf]) is a château in the commune of Aubas, Dordogne, Nouvelle-Aquitaine, France.
