= Mauzens-et-Miremont =

- Commune
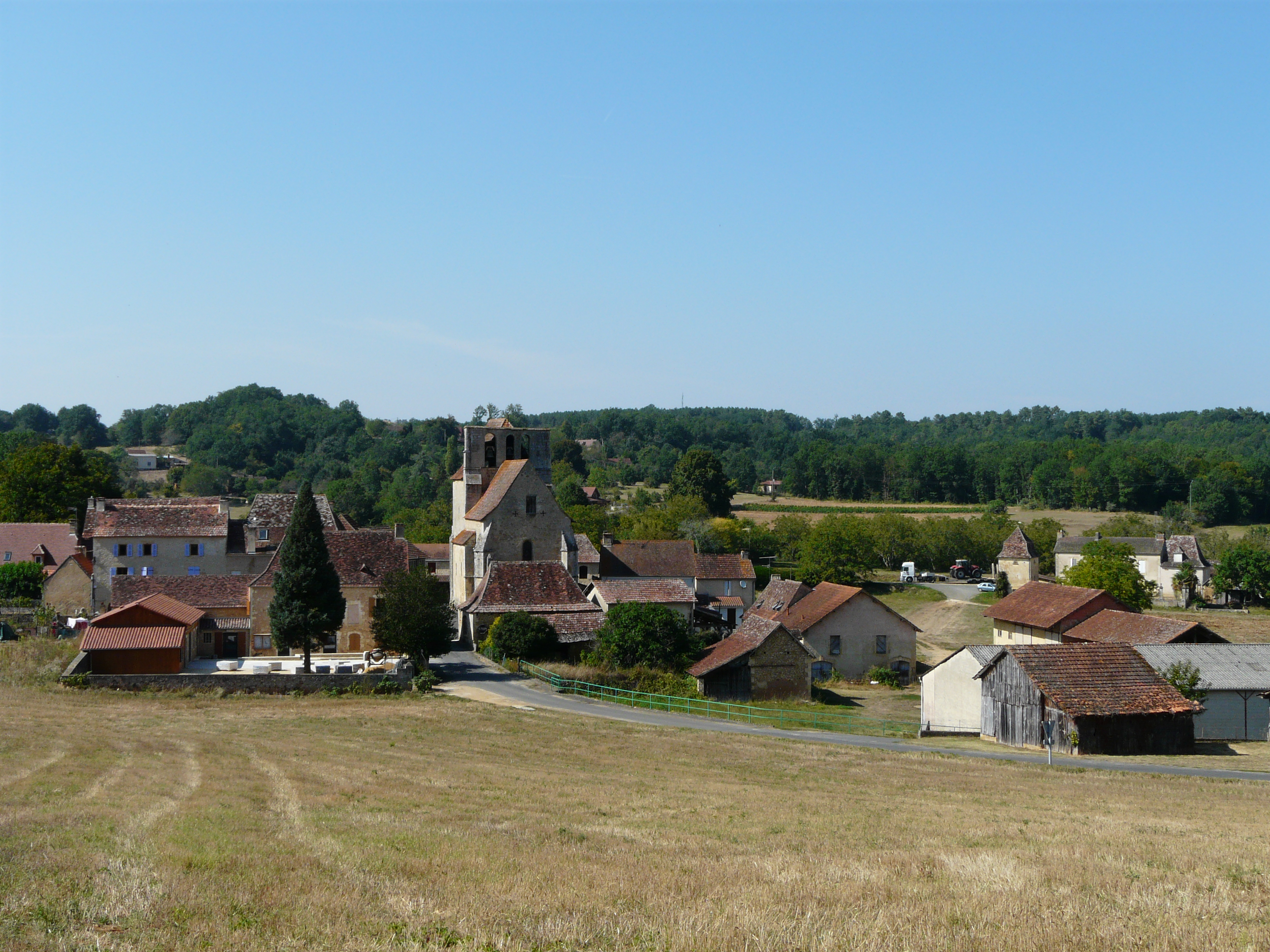
- A general view of Mauzens

- Coat of arms
- Location of Mauzens-et-Miremont
- Location within France Location within Nouvelle-Aquitaine
- Coordinates: 44°59′38″N 0°55′10″E
- Country: France
- Region: Nouvelle-Aquitaine
- Department: Dordogne
- Arrondissement: Sarlat-la-Canéda
- Canton: Vallée de l'Homme

Government
  - Mayor (2020–2026): Philippe Cheyrou
- Area^{1}: 20.57 km^{2} (7.94 sq mi)
- Elevation: 228 m (748 ft)
- Highest elevation: 252 m (827 ft)
- Lowest elevation: 86 m (282 ft)
- Population (2023): 288
  - Density: 14.0/km^{2} (36.3/sq mi)
- Time zone: UTC+01:00 (CET)
  - Summer (DST): UTC+02:00 (CEST)
- INSEE/Postal code: 24261 /24260
- ^{1} French Land Register data, which excludes lakes, ponds, glaciers > 1 km^{2} (0.386 sq mi or 247 acres) and river estuaries.

Mauzens-et-Miremont is a commune in the Dordogne department in Nouvelle-Aquitaine in southwestern France.

== Population ==
Historical population
Year	Pop.	±% p.a.
1968	377	—
1975	294	−3.49%
1982	330	+1.66%
1990	302	−1.10%
1999	338	+1.26%
2007	328	−0.37%
2012	324	−0.25%
2017	301	−1.46%
2023	288	−0.73%
Source: INSEE

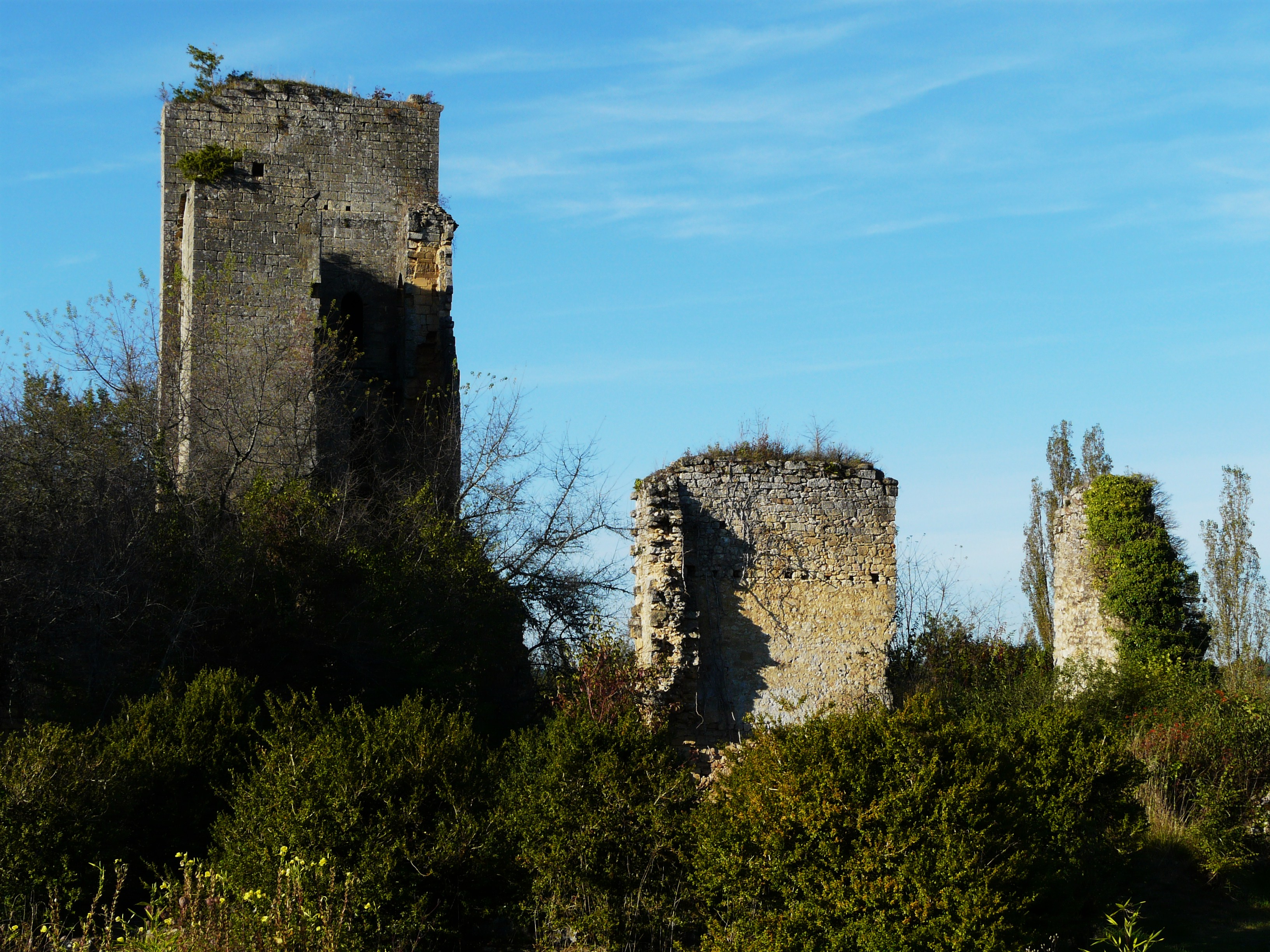
Chateau ruins

== See also ==
- Communes of the Dordogne department
