= Château de Campagne =

Castle in France

Coordinates: 44°54′30″N 0°58′05″E

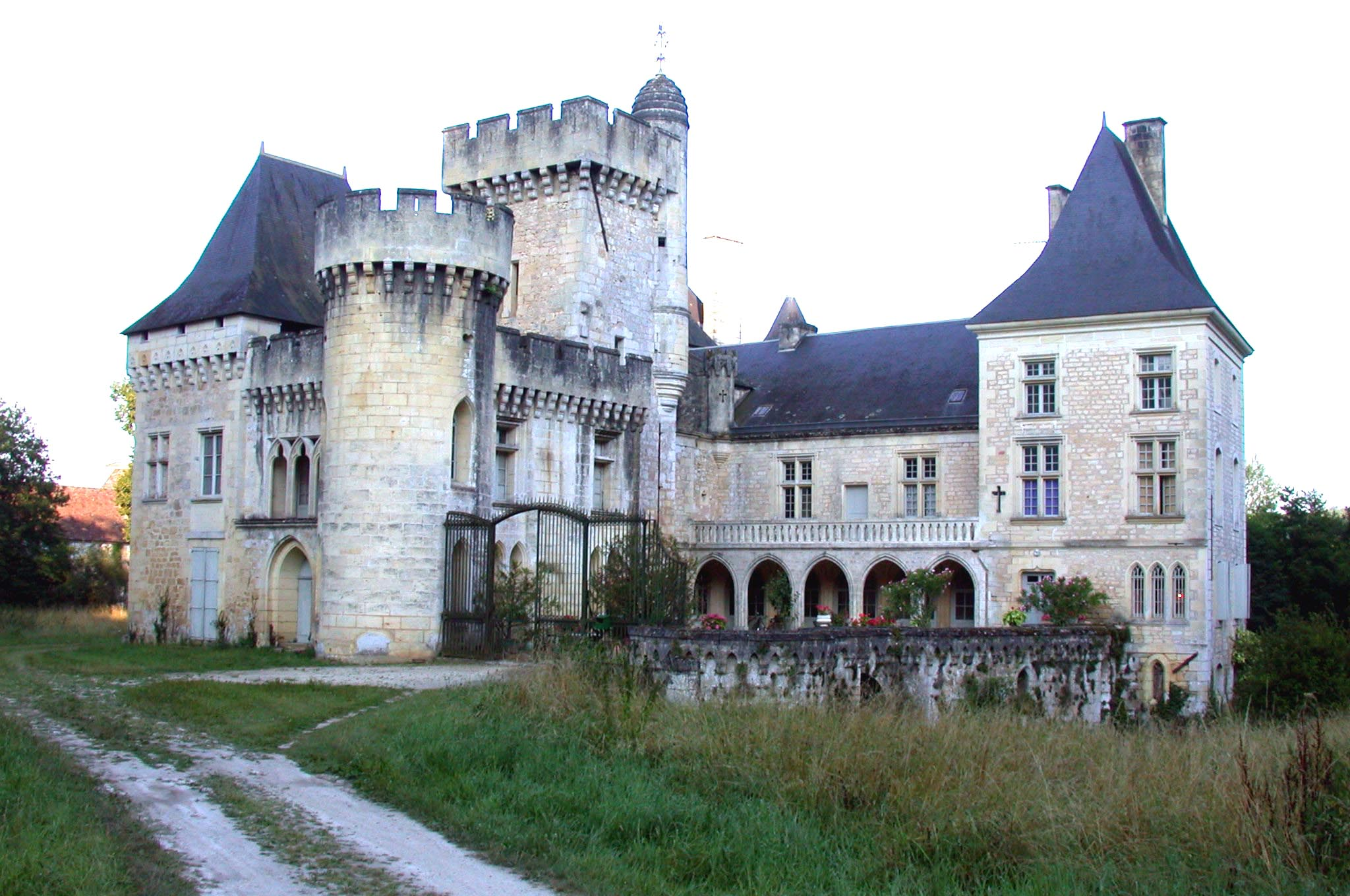

Château de Campagne is a château in Dordogne, Aquitaine, France.

Château de Campagne is located in the municipality of Campagne in the French Dordogne, on the northern edge of the village of Campagne. It is under protection as historical monuments. The castle is partially surrounded by a moat and a park. The park is open to the public. The castle is known since the twelfth century. It was a possession of the archbishops of Bordeaux which Jean de Beaufort grabs in 1405 to return to the English. The French retrieve it in 1432 and it was razed by order of King Charles VII. The current building, built in the fifteenth, seventeenth and eighteenth centuries, was the subject of restorations in the nineteenth century in 2008 to 2014.

In 1970, the state received the castle as a legacy from the last marquis Campaign. It was fully registered as a historic monument on April 5, 2001, with its dependencies, its park and fences. Since 2007 it has been the property of the department of Dordogne that has installed the administrative services of the International Division of Prehistory (PIP).

Between the lavoir and the church is the entrance to the Chateau of Campagne.

In recent years it grounds have been renovated. The castle is not open to visitors but its grounds are free to visit.

The grounds were originally laid out in the style of English Country gardens of the 19th century and contain some magnificent trees including huge redwoods and cedar trees. Recently the edges of a stream winding through the garden have been planted and visitors can walk along the stream and around the grounds.

There is also a decorative vegetable garden and a labyrinth to explore in the gardens. The walk around the gardens and grounds offers views of all sides of the chateau with its decorative towers and roofs.

The agricultural buildings of the castle have also been renovated and these are now used by the International Prehistory Centre.

The park covers 6 hectares and opens onto a forest of 367 hectares part of which is a classified Biological Reserve.
