= Château de Sauvebœuf (Lalinde) =

Château in Nouvelle-Aquitaine, France

Coordinates: 44°50′54″N 0°46′34″E

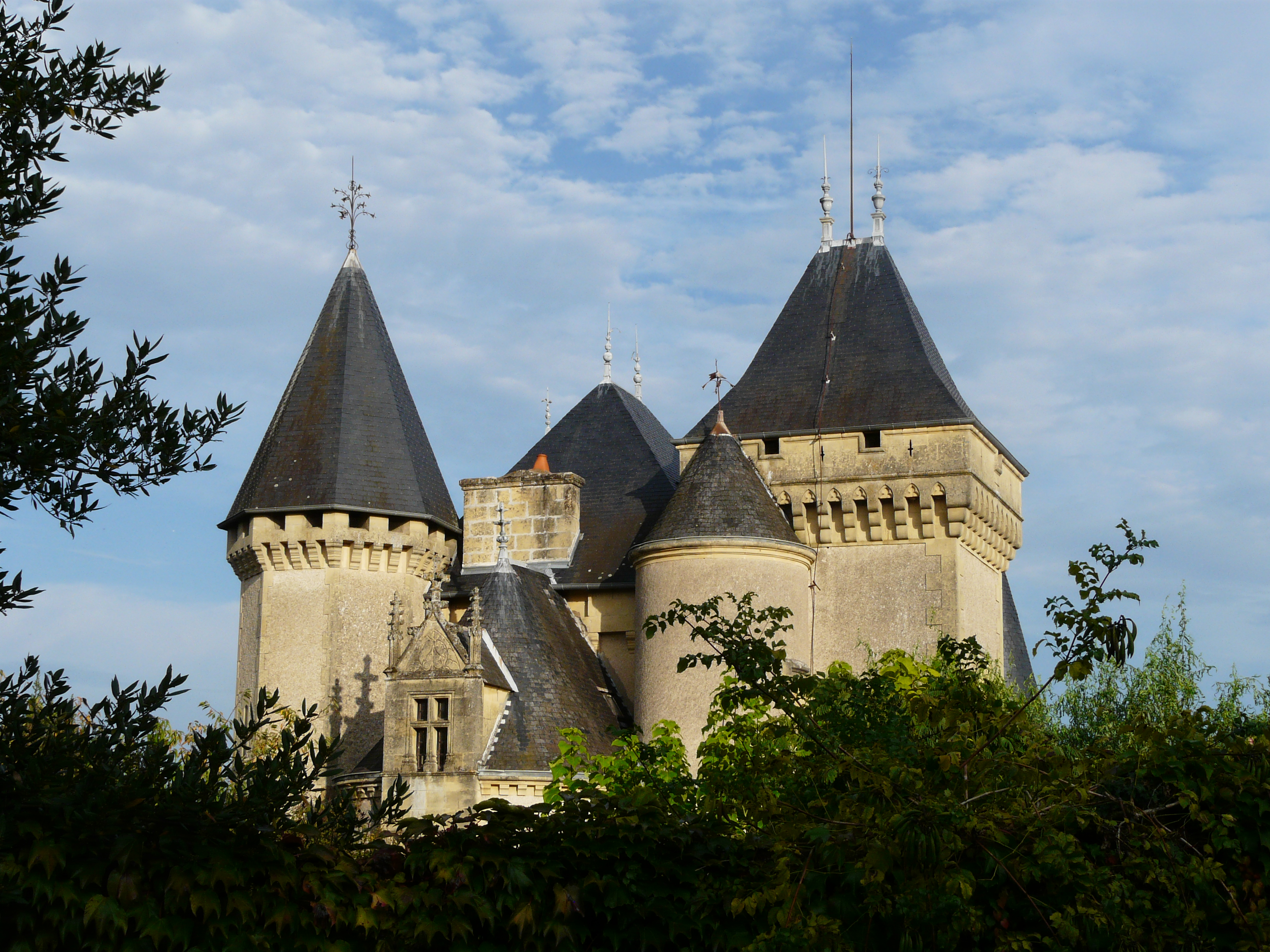
Château de Sauvebœuf

The Château de Sauvebœuf (French pronunciation: [ʃato də sovbœf]) is a château in the commune of Lalinde, Dordogne, Nouvelle-Aquitaine, France.
