= Savignac-de-Miremont =

- Commune
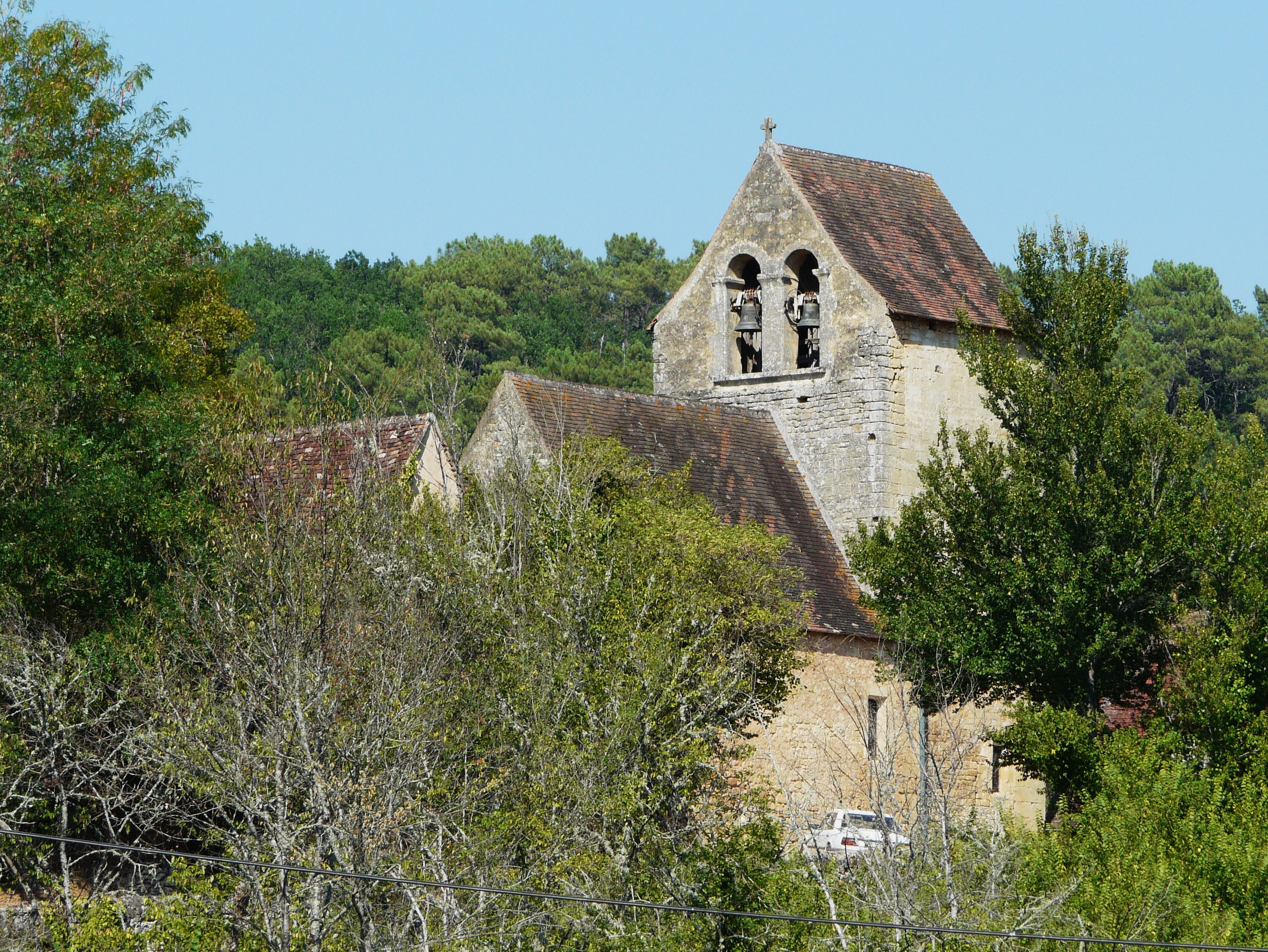
- The church in Savignac-de-Miremont
- Location of Savignac-de-Miremont
- Location within France Location within Nouvelle-Aquitaine
- Coordinates: 44°58′24″N 0°56′44″E
- Country: France
- Region: Nouvelle-Aquitaine
- Department: Dordogne
- Arrondissement: Sarlat-la-Canéda
- Canton: Vallée de l'Homme

Government
  - Mayor (2020–2026): Jean-Paul Simon
- Area^{1}: 7.62 km^{2} (2.94 sq mi)
- Elevation: 144 m (472 ft)
- Highest elevation: 229 m (751 ft)
- Lowest elevation: 75 m (246 ft)
- Population (2023): 173
  - Density: 22.7/km^{2} (58.8/sq mi)
- Time zone: UTC+01:00 (CET)
  - Summer (DST): UTC+02:00 (CEST)
- INSEE/Postal code: 24524 /24260
- ^{1} French Land Register data, which excludes lakes, ponds, glaciers > 1 km^{2} (0.386 sq mi or 247 acres) and river estuaries.

Savignac-de-Miremont (French pronunciation: [saviɲak də miʁmɔ̃]; Occitan: Savinhac de Miramont) is a commune in the Dordogne department in Nouvelle-Aquitaine in southwestern France.

== Population ==
Historical population
Year	Pop.	±% p.a.
1968	125	—
1975	107	−2.20%
1982	108	+0.13%
1990	107	−0.12%
1999	95	−1.31%
2007	145	+5.43%
2012	174	+3.71%
2017	177	+0.34%
2023	173	−0.38%
Source: INSEE

== See also ==
- La Ferrassie, an archaeological site in Savignac-de-Miremont
- Communes of the Dordogne département
