= TER Aquitaine =

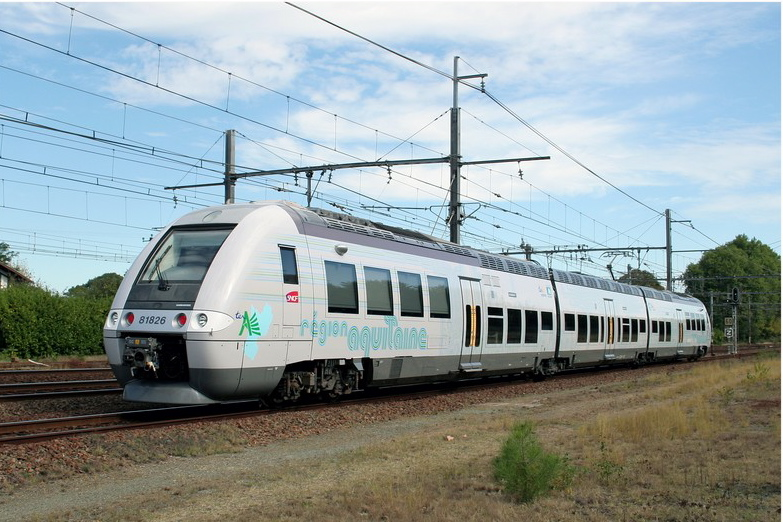
- B 81500 with TER Aquitaine branding

Overview
- Number of lines: 15
- Number of stations: 171
- Daily ridership: 40,500
- Website: http://www.sncf.com/en/trains/ter

Operation
- Began operation: 1986
- Operator: SNCF
- Number of vehicles: 310

Technical
- System length: 1,500 km (930 mi)
- Track gauge: 1,435 mm (4 ft 8 1/2 in) standard gauge
TER Aquitane system map
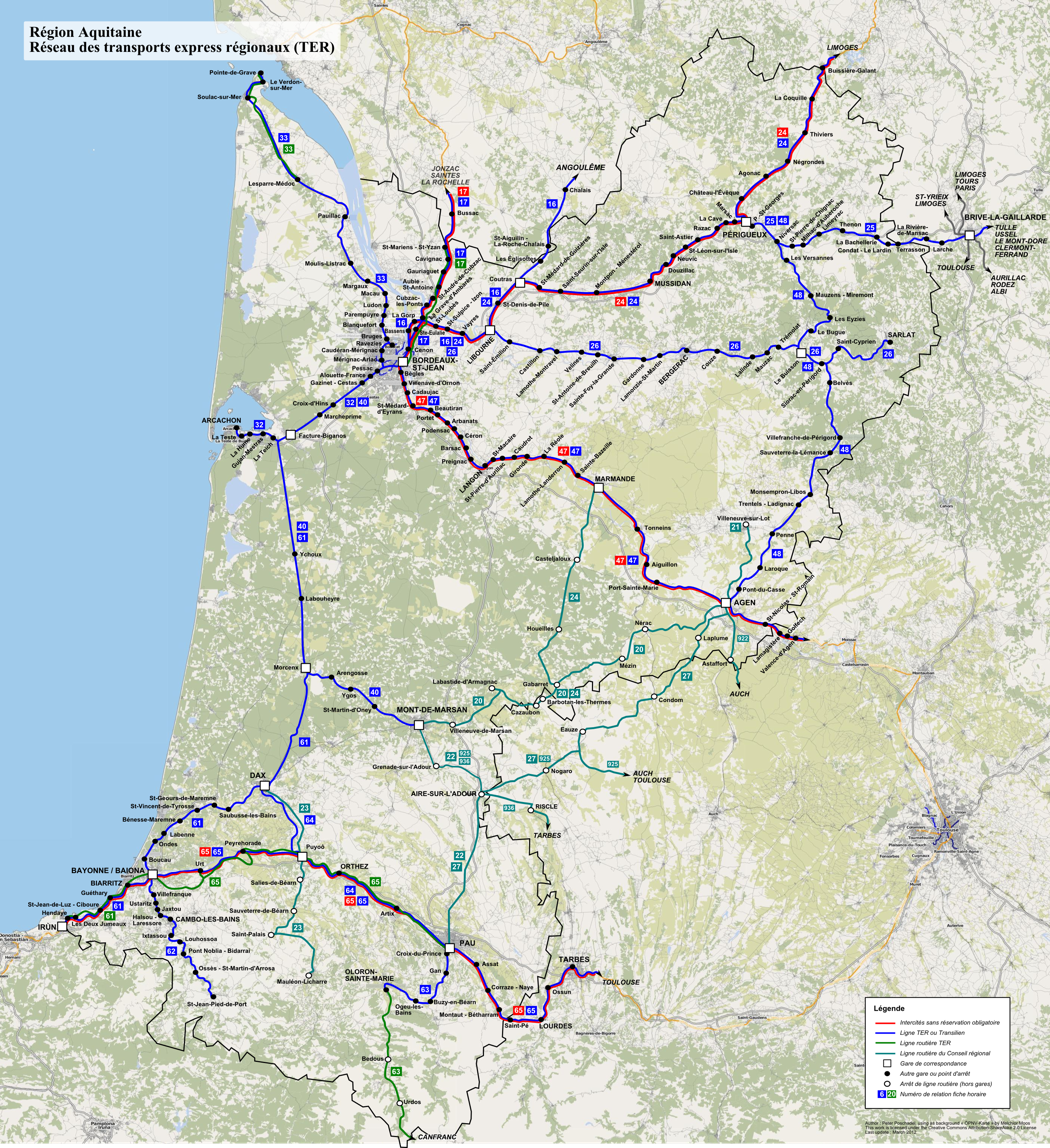

TER Aquitaine was the regional rail network serving the Aquitaine région, France. In 2017 it was merged into the new TER Nouvelle-Aquitaine.

== Network ==
=== Rail ===
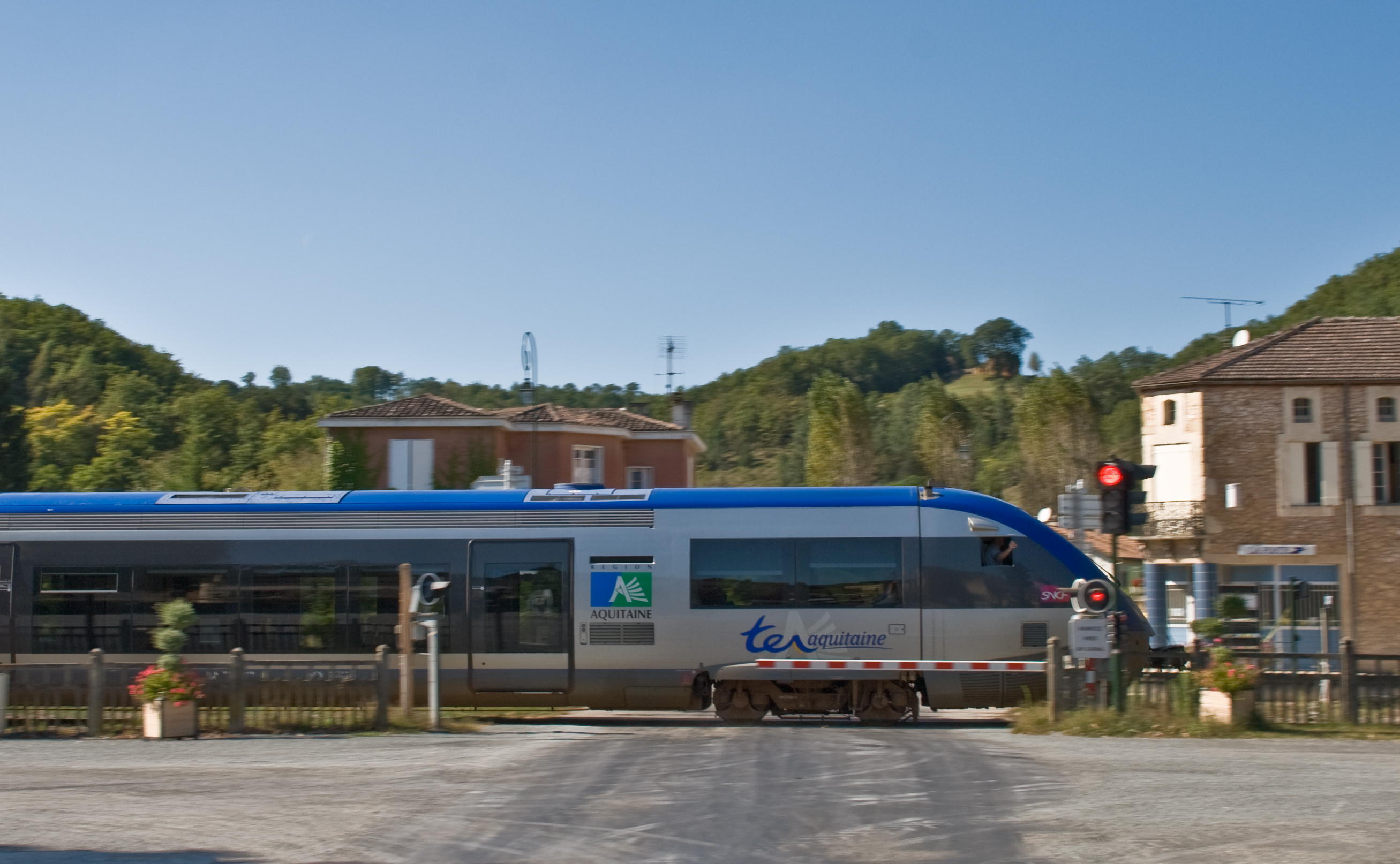
TER train at Sauveterre, Lot-et-Garonne

Line	Route	Frequency	Notes
16	Bordeaux-Saint-Jean – Cenon – Bassens† – La Gorp† – Saint-Loubès† – Saint-Sulpice-Izon† – Vayres† – Libourne – Saint-Denis-de-Pile† – Coutras – Les Églisottes – Saint-Aigulin-La-Roche-Chalais – Chalais – Montmoreau – Angoulême	2× per day Bordeaux–Angoulême, 1× per day Coutras–Angoulême, several additional services between Bordeaux and Coutras	
17	Bordeaux-Saint-Jean ... Saintes		
24	Bordeaux-Saint-Jean – Cenon – Libourne – Coutras – Saint-Médard-de-Guizières† – Saint-Seurin-sur-l'Isle† – Montpon-Ménestérol – Mussidan – Douzillac† – Neuvic† – Saint-Léon-sur-l'Isle† – Saint-Astier – Razac† – La Cave† – Marsac† – Périgueux	13× per day, some trains continue to Limoges (see TER Limousin line 4) or Brive-la-Gaillarde (see line 25)	
25	Périgueux – Niversac† – Saint-Pierre-de-Chignac† – Milhac-d'Auberoche† – Limeyrat† – Thenon – La Bachellerie† – Condat-Le Lardin – Terrasson – La Rivière-de-Mansac† – Larche† – Brive-la-Gaillarde	12× per day, some trains continue to Bordeaux (see line 24)	
26	Bordeaux-Saint-Jean – Cenon – Libourne – Saint-Emilion – Castillon – Lamothe-Montravel† – Velines† – Saint-Antoine-de-Breuilh† – Sainte-Foy-la-Grande – Gardonne† – Lamonzie-Saint-Martin† – Bergerac – Couze† – Lalinde – Mauzac† – Trémolat – Le Buisson – Siorac-en-Périgord† – Saint-Cyprien – Sarlat-la-Canéda	6× per day Bordeaux–Sarlat-la-Canéda, 5× per day Bordeaux–Bergerac, 1× per day Libourne–Bergerac	
32	Bordeaux-Saint-Jean – Biganos-Facture -Arcachon		
33	Bordeaux-Saint-Jean ... Pauillac ... Le Verdon-sur-Mer		
40	Bordeaux-Saint-Jean ... Mont-de-Marsan		
47	Bordeaux-Saint-Jean – Bègles† – Villenave-d'Ornon† – Cadaujac† – Saint-Médard-d'Eyrans† – Beautiran† – Portets† – Arbanats† – Podensac† – Cérons† – Barsac† – Preignac† – Langon – Saint-Macaire† – Saint-Pierre-d'Aurillac† – Caudrot† – Gironde† – La Réole – Lamothe-Landerron† – Sainte-Bazeille† – Marmande – Tonneins – Aiguillon – Port-Sainte-Marie – Agen	10x per day Bordeaux–Agen, 2× per day Bordeaux–Marmande, 7× per day Bordeaux–Langon, 1× per day Marmande–Agen	
48	Périgueux – Périgueux-Saint-Georges† – Niversac – Les Versannes† – Mauzens-Miremont† – Les Eyzies – Le Bugue – Le Buisson – Siorac-en-Périgord – Belvès – Villefranche-du-Périgord – Sauveterre-la-Lémance† – Monsempron-Libos – Trentels-Ladignac† – Penne-d'Agenais – Laroque-Timbaut† – Pont-du-Casse† – Agen	4× per day Périgueux–Agen, 2× per day Périgueux–Le Buisson, 4× per day Monsempron-Libos–Agen	
61	Bordeaux-Saint-Jean – Pessac – Biganos-Facture – Ychoux† – Labouheyre† – Morcenx – Dax – Saubusse-les-Bains† – Saint-Geours-de-Maremne† – Saint-Vincent-de-Tyrosse – Bénesse-Maremne† – Labenne† – Ondres† – Boucau† – Bayonne – Biarritz – Guéthary† – Saint-Jean-de-Luz-Ciboure – Les Deux-Jumeaux† – Hendaye	5× per day Bordeaux–Hendaye, 9× per day Dax–Hendaye, 1× per day Bayonne–Hendaye	
62	Bayonne – Villefranque† – Ustaritz – Jatxou† – Halsou-Larressore† – Cambo-les-Bains – Itxassou† – Louhossoa† – Bidarray-Pont-Noblia – Ossès-Saint-Martin-d'Arrossa – Saint-Jean-Pied-de-Port	3× per day	
63	Pau – La Croix du Prince – Gan – Buzy – Ogeu-les-Bains – Oloron-Sainte-Marie	8× per day	
64	Bordeaux-Saint-Jean – Pessac – Biganos-Facture – Ychoux† – Labouheyre† – Morcenx – Dax – Puyoô – Orthez – Artix – Pau	4× per day Bordeaux–Pau, 3× per day Bordeaux–Dax, 4× per day Dax–Pau	
65	Bayonne – Urt† – Peyrehorade – Puyoô – Orthez – Artix† – Pau – Assat† – Coarraze-Nay – Montaut-Bétharram† – Saint-Pé-de-Bigorre† – Lourdes – Ossun† – Tarbes	2× per day Bayonne–Tarbes, 2× per day Bayonne–Pau	
† Not all trains call at this station

=== Road ===
- Agen – Villeneuve-sur-Lot
- Ossès – Saint-Étienne-de-Baïgorry
- Dax – Mauléon
- Bordeaux – Pauillac – Le Verdon
- Mont-de-Marsan – Hagetmau
- Mont-de-Marsan – Marmande
- Mont-de-Marsan – Agen
- Buzy – Artouste
- Oloron-Sainte-Marie – Canfranc
- Dax – Mont-de-Marsan – Tarbes

== Rolling stock ==
The quantity is given when known

=== Multiple units ===
- SNCF Class Z 5300
- 26 SNCF Class Z 7300
- 6 SNCF Class Z 21500
- SNCF Class X 2200
- SNCF Class X 2800
- 12 SNCF Class X 72500
- 12 SNCF Class X 73500
- 14 SNCF Class B 81500

=== Locomotives ===
- SNCF Class BB 8500
- SNCF Class BB 9300
- SNCF Class BB 67400

== See also ==
- SNCF
- Transport express régional
- Réseau Ferré de France
- List of SNCF stations
- List of SNCF stations in Aquitaine
- Aquitaine
