= Montravel =

Montravel may refer to:

- Montravel AOC, a French Bergerac AOC wine
- Anna Marie de Montravel, a rose cultivar named after a real person
- Lamothe-Montravel, a commune in the Dordogne department in Aquitaine in south-western France
