= Sauveterre-la-Lémance =

- Commune
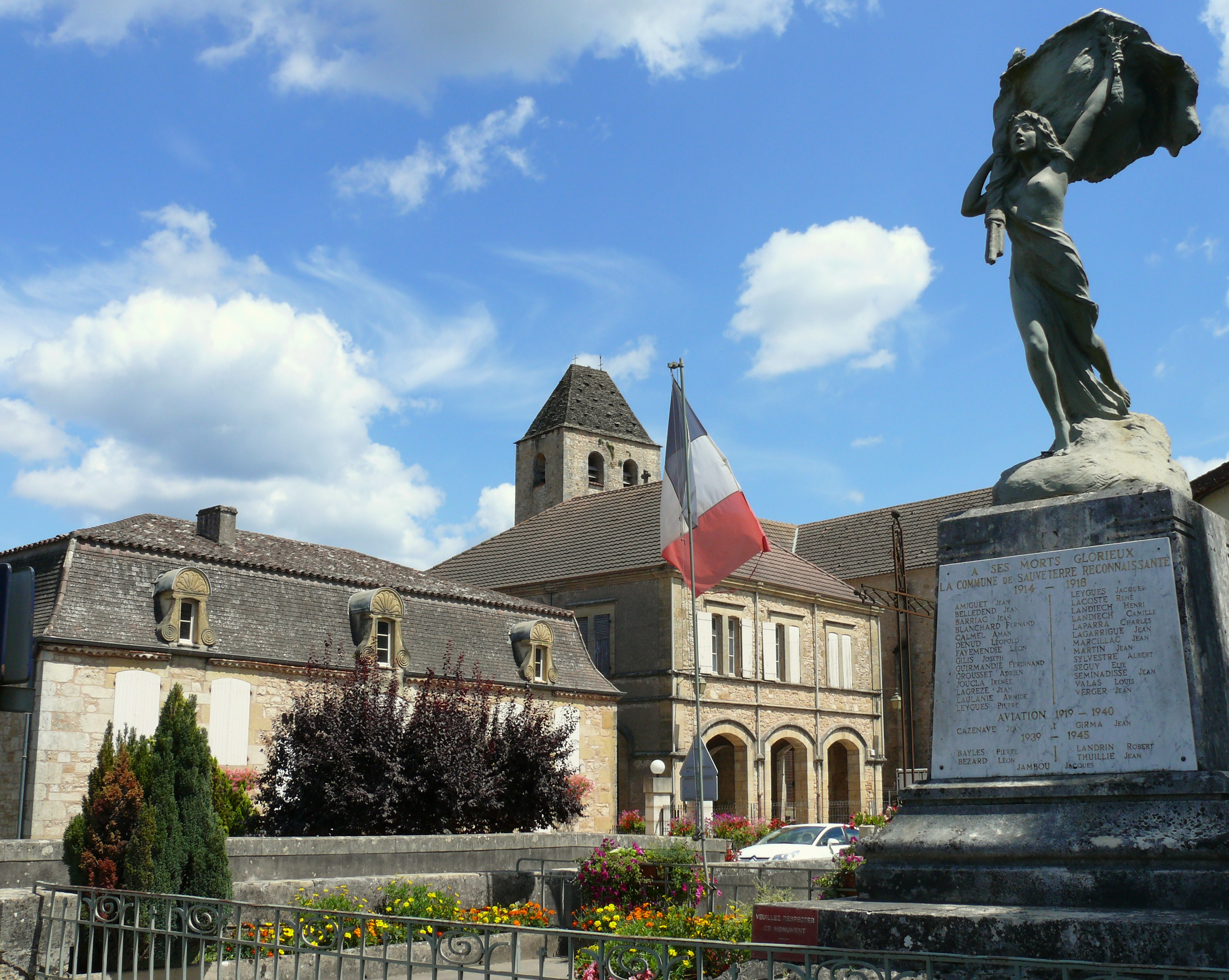
- The war memorial, town hall, museum and church in Sauveterre-la-Lémance
- Location of Sauveterre-la-Lémance
- Location within France Location within Nouvelle-Aquitaine
- Coordinates: 44°35′26″N 1°00′55″E
- Country: France
- Region: Nouvelle-Aquitaine
- Department: Lot-et-Garonne
- Arrondissement: Villeneuve-sur-Lot
- Canton: Le Fumélois
- Intercommunality: Fumel Vallée du Lot

Government
  - Mayor (2020–2026): Jean-Pierre Calmel
- Area^{1}: 23.46 km^{2} (9.06 sq mi)
- Elevation: 125 m (410 ft)
- Highest elevation: 284 m (932 ft)
- Lowest elevation: 115 m (377 ft)
- Population (2023): 563
  - Density: 24.0/km^{2} (62.2/sq mi)
- Time zone: UTC+01:00 (CET)
  - Summer (DST): UTC+02:00 (CEST)
- INSEE/Postal code: 47292 /47500
- ^{1} French Land Register data, which excludes lakes, ponds, glaciers > 1 km^{2} (0.386 sq mi or 247 acres) and river estuaries.

Sauveterre-la-Lémance (French pronunciation: [sovtɛʁ la lemɑ̃s]; Occitan: Salvatèrra de Lemança) is a commune in the Lot-et-Garonne department in south-western France.

== Geography ==
Surrounded by green hills and situated in the Lémance valley on the borders of Bouriane and Périgord noir, it borders the departments of Dordogne and Lot. Sauveterre-la-Lémance station has rail connections to Périgueux and Agen.

== Château ==
Château des Rois ducs (also known as Château de Sauveterre) is a fortified castle located above the village. It was built at the end of the thirteenth century by Edward I of England in a strategic position between Périgord and Agen. During the Hundred Years' War, it became a center-piece in the Franco-English war of attrition. It was burnt down in 1789 during the French Revolution.

It was bought by aviator Jean Mermoz in 1936, a year before his death.

The castle has been classified as historical monument since 19 September 2003.

As of 2020, it is a private property and is not open to the public.

== Prehistoric Museum ==
SauveTerre Musée de Préhistoire is a museum that exhibits collections from archaeological digs in the Lémance valley, including part of the collection of L. Coulonges, a self-taught archaeologist who undertook excavations in the Lémance valley in the 1920s. Sauveterre-La-Lemance is home to several archaeological sites. The museum holds walking tours to the Martinet site along the Lemance river as well as providing brochures for self-guided walks.

In 1923, Laurence Coulonges discovered remains of a prehistoric culture between the Paleolithic and Neolithic period, somewhere between 7,000 and 9,500 years old. The first museum was installed by Coulonges on the first floor of the building, originally a girls' school. From 1972 onwards, further excavation of the archaeological sites renewed interest in the Fumel area. The current museum was inaugurated in 1994, particularly devoted to the Mesolithic period, in which men gradually passed from a society of hunter-gatherers to a way of life of producers and farmers.

They have a year-round program of educational activities and tours for children as well as temporary exhibitions.

== See also ==
- Communes of the Lot-et-Garonne department
