= Villefranche-du-Périgord =

- Commune
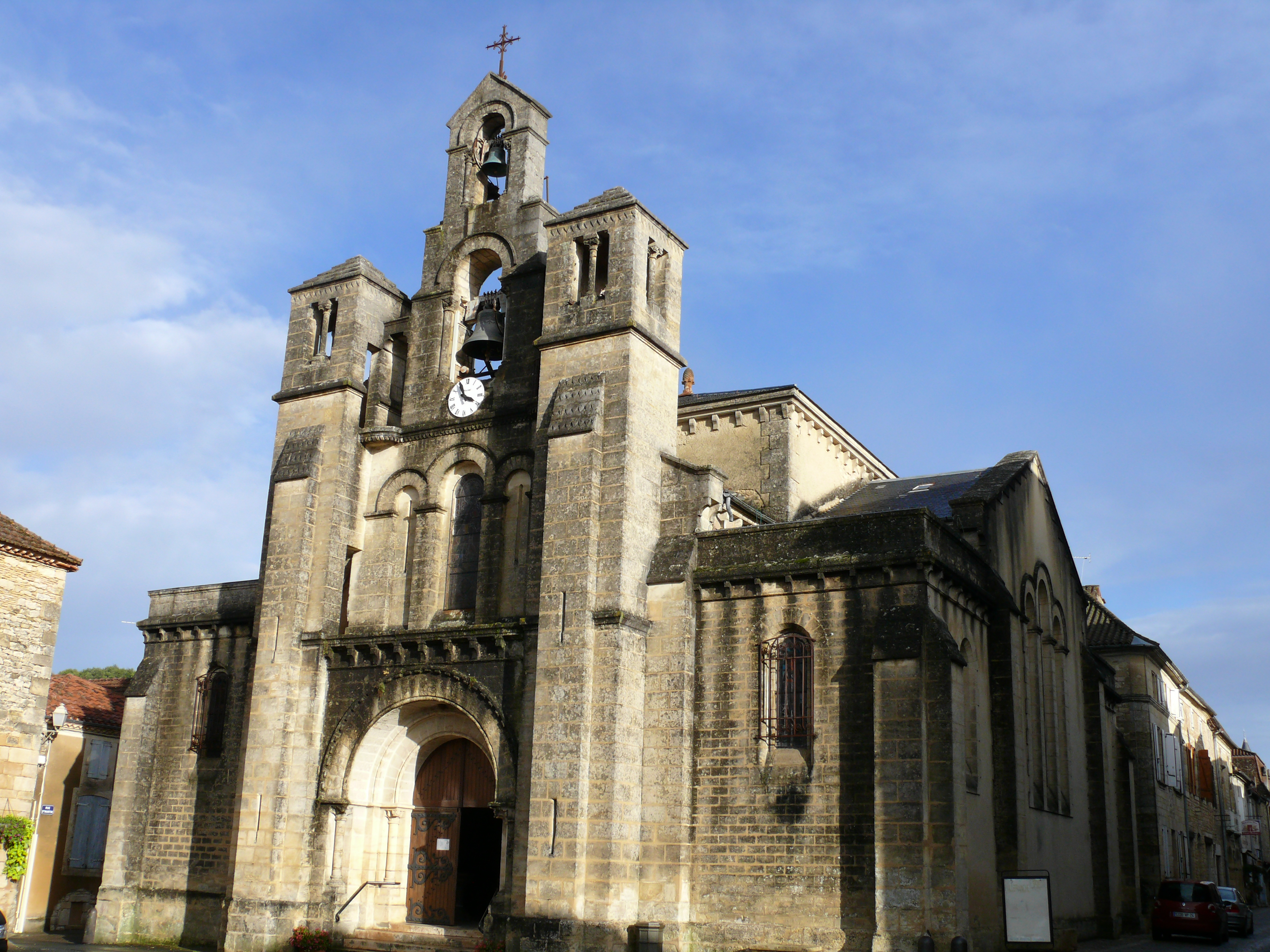
- The church in Villefranche-du-Périgord

- Coat of arms
- Location of Villefranche-du-Périgord
- Location within France Location within Nouvelle-Aquitaine
- Coordinates: 44°37′55″N 1°04′34″E
- Country: France
- Region: Nouvelle-Aquitaine
- Department: Dordogne
- Arrondissement: Sarlat-la-Canéda
- Canton: Vallée Dordogne

Government
  - Mayor (2020–2026): Claude Brondel
- Area^{1}: 24.5 km^{2} (9.5 sq mi)
- Elevation: 223 m (732 ft)
- Highest elevation: 301 m (988 ft)
- Lowest elevation: 155 m (509 ft)
- Population (2023): 674
  - Density: 27.5/km^{2} (71.3/sq mi)
- Time zone: UTC+01:00 (CET)
  - Summer (DST): UTC+02:00 (CEST)
- INSEE/Postal code: 24585 /24550
- ^{1} French Land Register data, which excludes lakes, ponds, glaciers > 1 km^{2} (0.386 sq mi or 247 acres) and river estuaries.

Villefranche-du-Périgord (French pronunciation: [vilfʁɑ̃ʃ dy peʁiɡɔʁ]; Languedocien: Vilafranca de Perigòrd) is a commune in the Dordogne department in Nouvelle-Aquitaine in southwestern France. Villefranche-du-Périgord station has rail connections to Périgueux and Agen.

== Population ==
Historical population
Year	Pop.	±% p.a.
1968	844	—
1975	808	−0.62%
1982	799	−0.16%
1990	827	+0.43%
1999	803	−0.33%
2007	770	−0.52%
2012	731	−1.03%
2017	693	−1.06%
2023	674	−0.46%
Source: INSEE

== See also ==
- Communes of the Dordogne department
