= Mansac =

- Commune
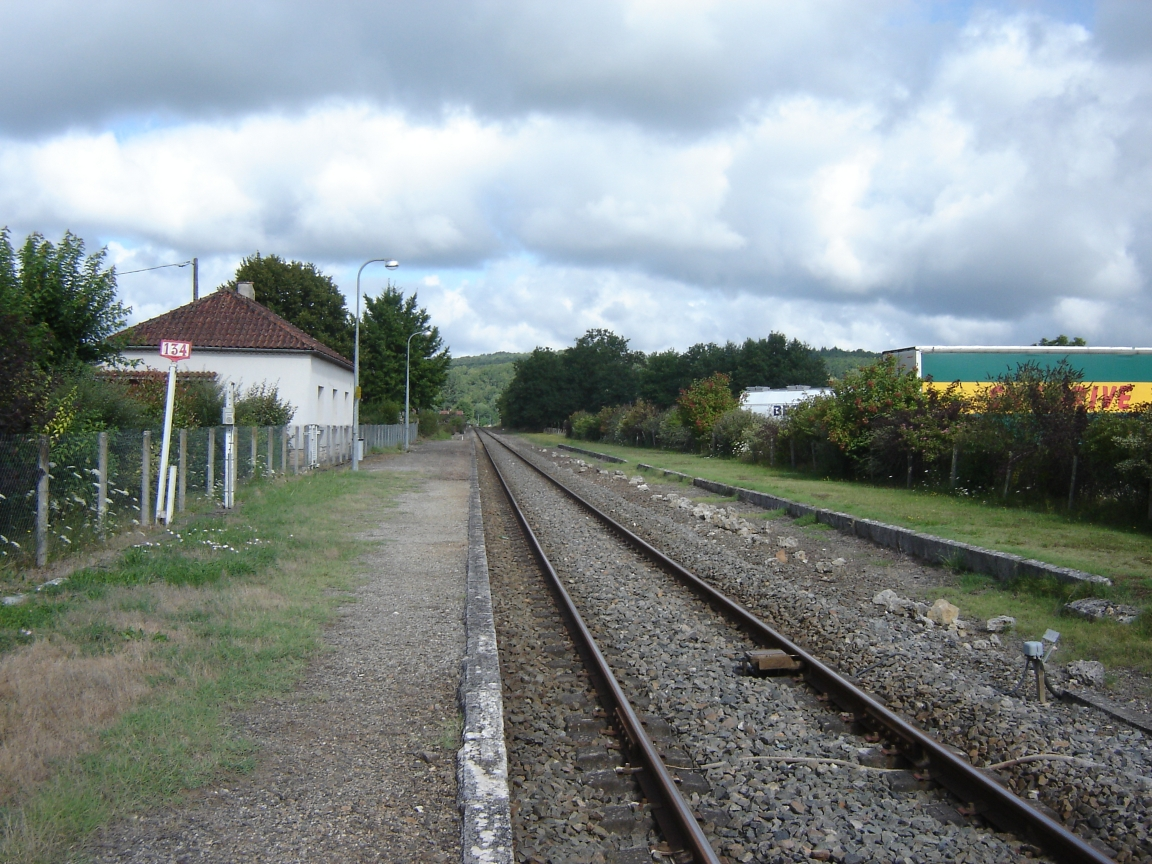
- The La Rivière-de-Mansac railway station

- Coat of arms
- Location of Mansac
- Location within France Location within Nouvelle-Aquitaine
- Coordinates: 45°10′10″N 1°23′03″E
- Country: France
- Region: Nouvelle-Aquitaine
- Department: Corrèze
- Arrondissement: Brive-la-Gaillarde
- Canton: Saint-Pantaléon-de-Larche
- Intercommunality: CA Bassin de Brive

Government
  - Mayor (2020–2026): Isabelle David
- Area^{1}: 18.4 km^{2} (7.1 sq mi)
- Elevation: 200 m (660 ft)
- Highest elevation: 243 m (797 ft)
- Lowest elevation: 88 m (289 ft)
- Population (2023): 1,554
  - Density: 84.5/km^{2} (219/sq mi)
- Time zone: UTC+01:00 (CET)
  - Summer (DST): UTC+02:00 (CEST)
- INSEE/Postal code: 19124 /19520
- ^{1} French Land Register data, which excludes lakes, ponds, glaciers > 1 km^{2} (0.386 sq mi or 247 acres) and river estuaries.

Mansac (French pronunciation: [mɑ̃sak]) is a commune in the Corrèze department in central France. La Rivière-de-Mansac station has rail connections to Brive-la-Gaillarde, Ussel and Bordeaux.

== Population ==
Historical population
Year	Pop.	±% p.a.
1968	1,114	—
1975	1,227	+1.39%
1982	1,281	+0.62%
1990	1,341	+0.57%
1999	1,312	−0.24%
2007	1,372	+0.56%
2012	1,361	−0.16%
2017	1,427	+0.95%
2023	1,554	+1.43%
Source: INSEE

== See also ==
- Communes of the Corrèze department
