= Château des Rois ducs =

Castle in Lot-et-Garonne, France

Château des Rois duc
- Sauveterre-la-Lémance, Lot-et-Garonne in France
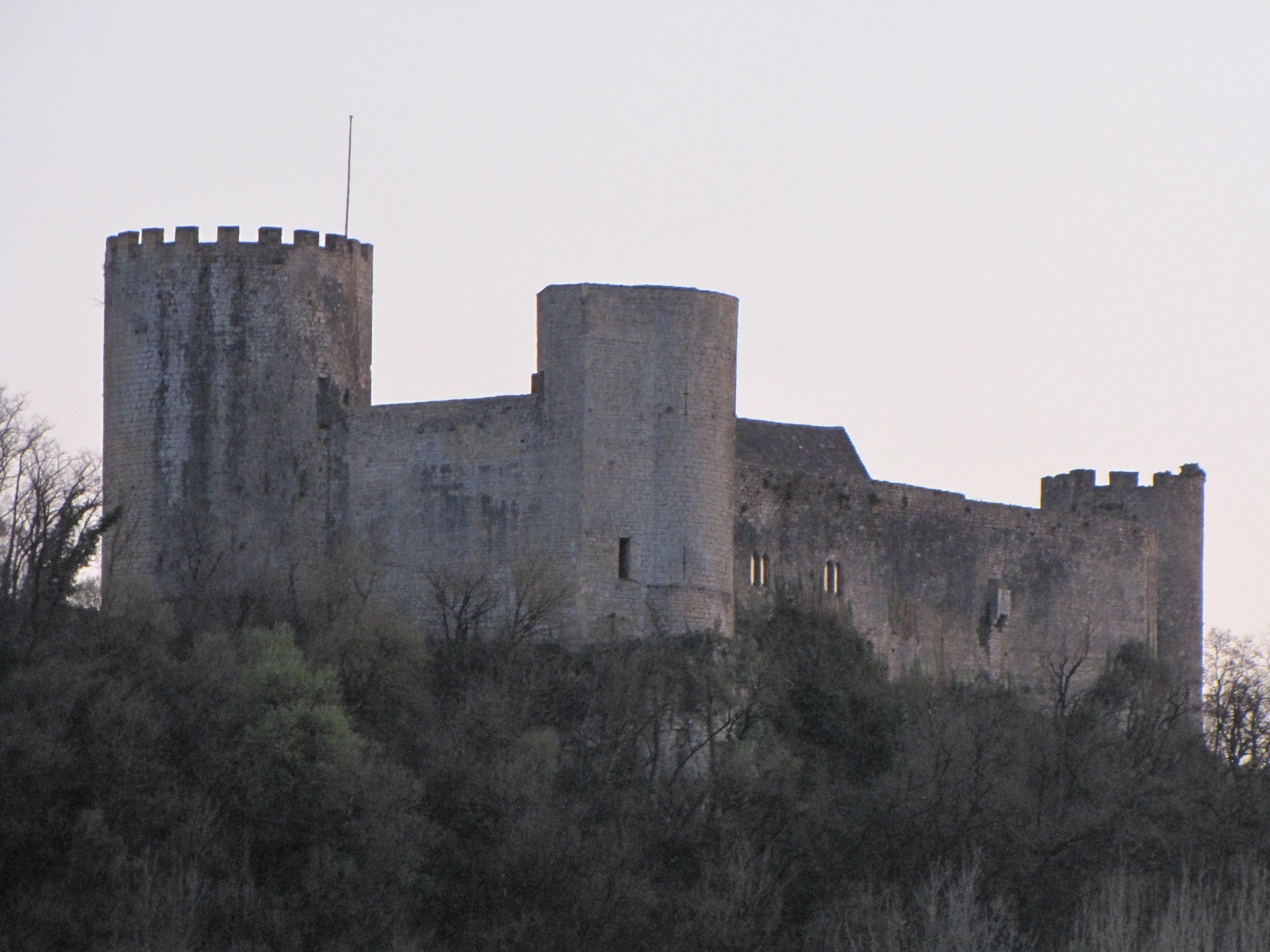
- Château des Rois ducs

Site information
- Type: Castle
- Owner: Private
- Condition: Restored

Location
- Coordinates: 44°35′28″N 1°01′09″E

Site history
- Built: 13 and 16th centuries

Le Château des Rois ducs (also known as Château de Sauveterre) is a castle in the commune of Sauveterre-la-Lémance in the Lot-et-Garonne département of France.

== History ==
It was constructed at the end of the 13th century by Edward I of England on one of the principal routes between Périgord and Agenais. During the Hundred Years' War, it became a centrepiece in the Anglo-French war of attrition. It was burned in 1789 during the French Revolution.

It was bought by the aviator Jean Mermoz in 1936, less than a year before his death. He had seen the castle from the air. After his death, the castle was abandoned and became the property of the commune until it was sold in the 1980s.

The castle in its entirety, as well as its grounds and moat, have been classified as historical monuments since 19 September 2003. It is privately owned.

== Description ==
Built on a rocky outcrop, it overlooks the valleys of the Lémance and the Sendroux. It is located not far from Périgord Noir (Dordogne) and Quercy (Lot).

== See also ==
- List of castles in France

== Bibliography ==
- Philippe Tholin, "Le château de Sauveterre-la-Lémance", p. 371-377, in La vallée de la Lémance et sa région, Revue d'histoire de Lot-et-Garonne et de l'ancien Agenois, Académie des sciences, lettres et arts d'Agen, July–September 2006, vol 133(3) (in French)
- Georges Tholin, "Le château de Sauveterre-la-Lémance", Revue de l'Agenais, 1897, vol 23, pp. 193–200 (in French)
- Stéphane Capot, "091 - Sauveterre-la-Lémance, château et bourg féodal, Le Festin", series Le Lot-et-Garonne en 101 sites et monuments, 2014, pp. 118–119 ISBN 978-2-36062-103-3 (in French)
