= Louhossoa station =

Railway station in Louhossoa, France

Coordinates: 43°18′21″N 1°21′43″W

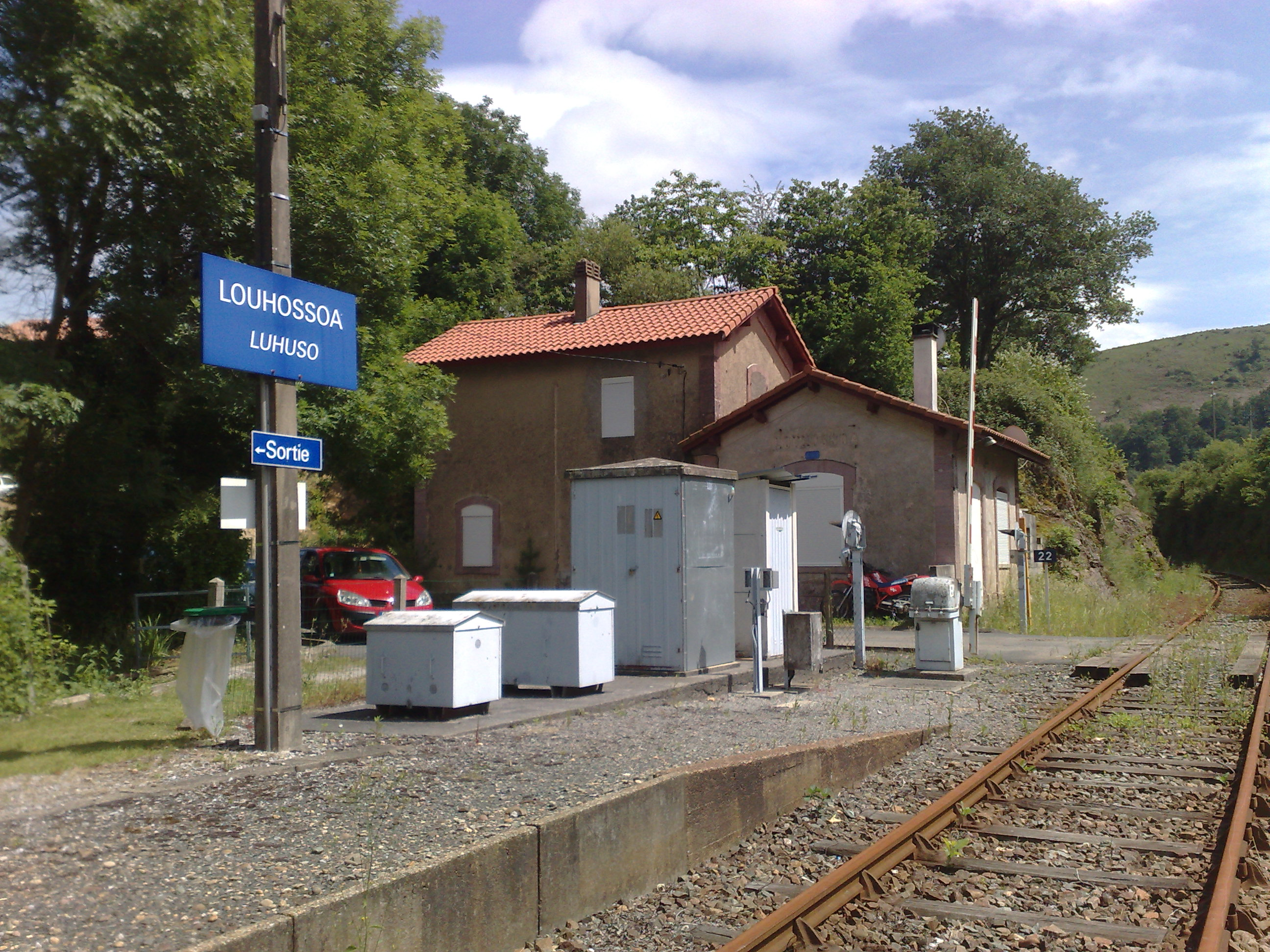
Louhossoa station

Louhossoa or Luhuso is a former railway station in Louhossoa, Nouvelle-Aquitaine, France. The station was opened in 1892 (133 years ago) and is located on the Bayonne - Saint-Jean-Pied-de-Port railway line. The station was served by TER (local) services operated by the SNCF. It was closed in 2019.
