= Mauzens-Miremont station =

Railway station in Mauzens-et-Miremont, France

Coordinates: 44°58′39″N 0°57′25″E

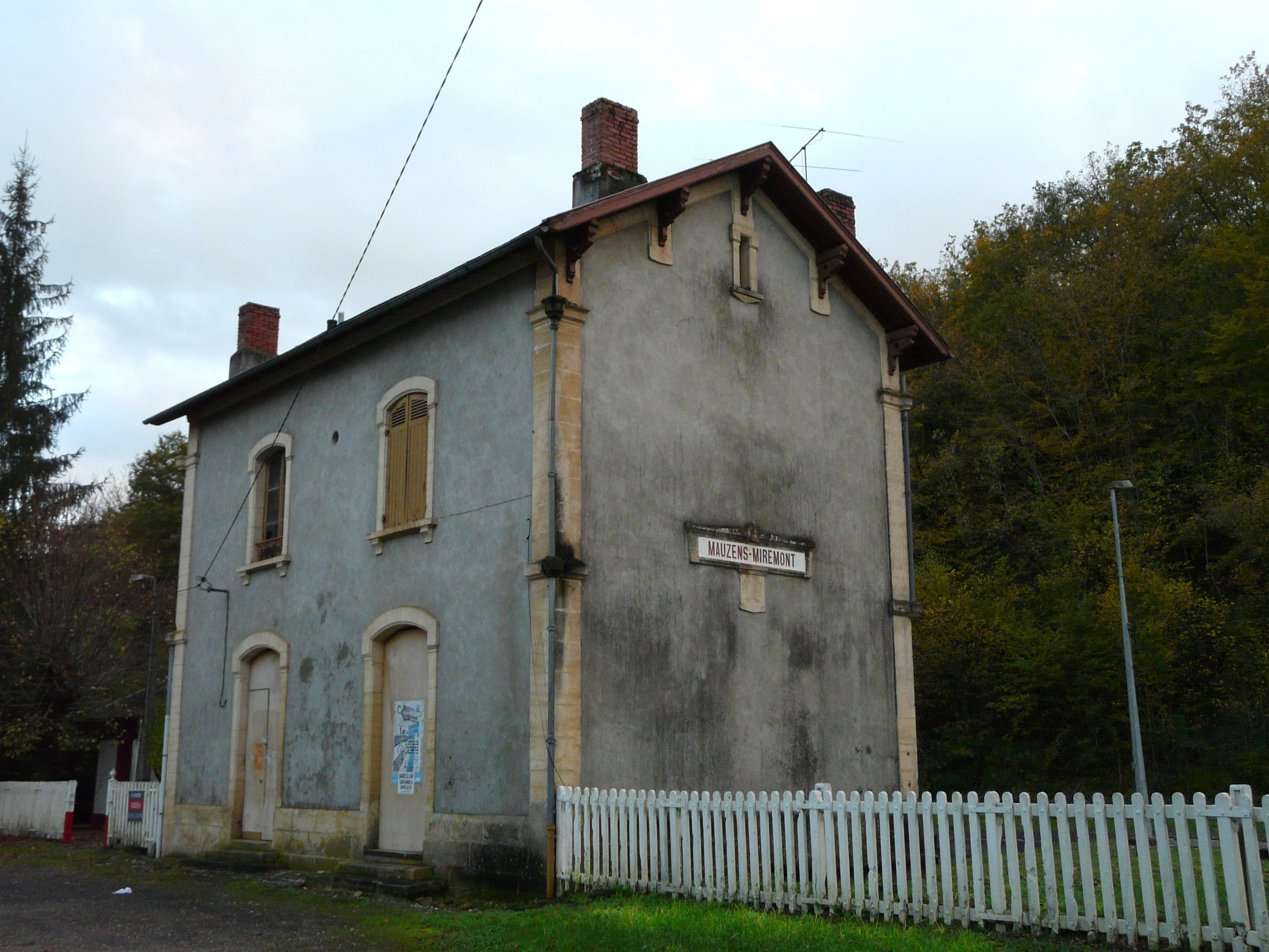
Mauzens-et-Miremont station

Mauzens-Miremont is a former railway station in Mauzens-et-Miremont, Nouvelle-Aquitaine, France. The station is located on the Niversac - Agen railway line. The station is served by TER Nouvelle-Aquitaine bus services on demand to Les Versannes. Train services were suspended in 2020.
