= Limeyrat station =

Former railway station in Nouvelle-Aquitaine, France

Coordinates: 45°09′21″N 0°58′38″E

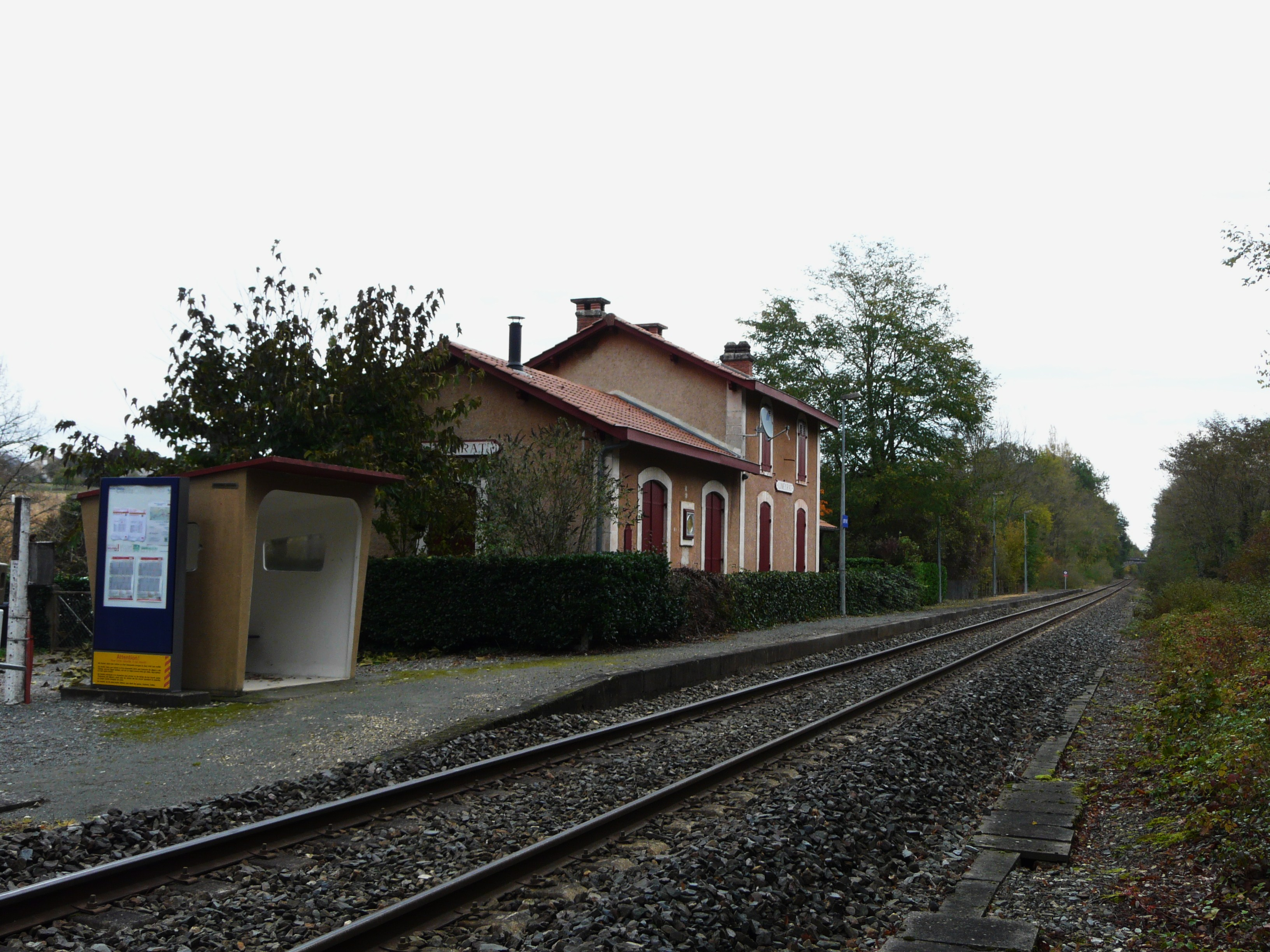
Limeyrat station

Limeyrat is a former railway station in Limeyrat, Nouvelle-Aquitaine, France. The station is located on the Coutras - Tulle railway line. The station is served by TER Nouvelle-Aquitaine bus services on demand to Saint-Pierre-de-Chignac. Train services were suspended in 2020.
