= Condat–Le Lardin station =

Railway station in Le Lardin-Saint-Lazare, France

Coordinates: 45°07′36″N 1°13′39″E

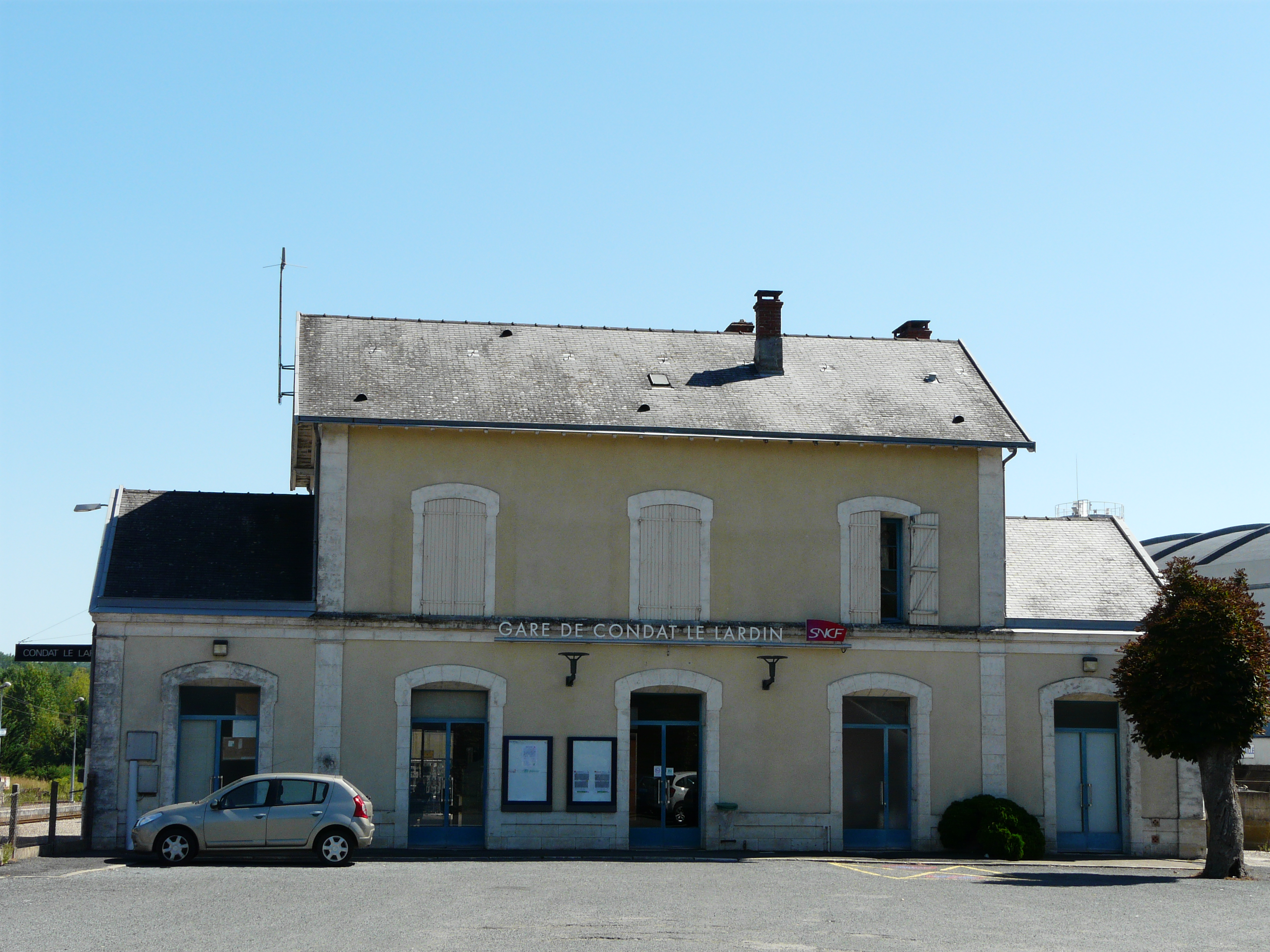
Condat-Le Lardin station

Condat–Le Lardin station (French: Gare de Condat–Le Lardin) is a railway station in Le Lardin-Saint-Lazare and close to Condat-sur-Vézère, Nouvelle-Aquitaine, France. The station is located on the Coutras - Tulle railway line. The station is served by TER (local) services operated by SNCF.

== Train services ==
The station is served by regional trains to Bordeaux, Périgueux, Brive-la-Gaillarde and Ussel.

| Preceding station | TER Nouvelle-Aquitaine | Following station |
|---|---|---|
| Thenon towards Bordeaux | 32 | Terrasson towards Ussel |
