= Sauveterre-la-Lémance station =

Railway station in Sauveterre-la-Lémance, France

Coordinates: 44°37′36″N 1°02′57″E

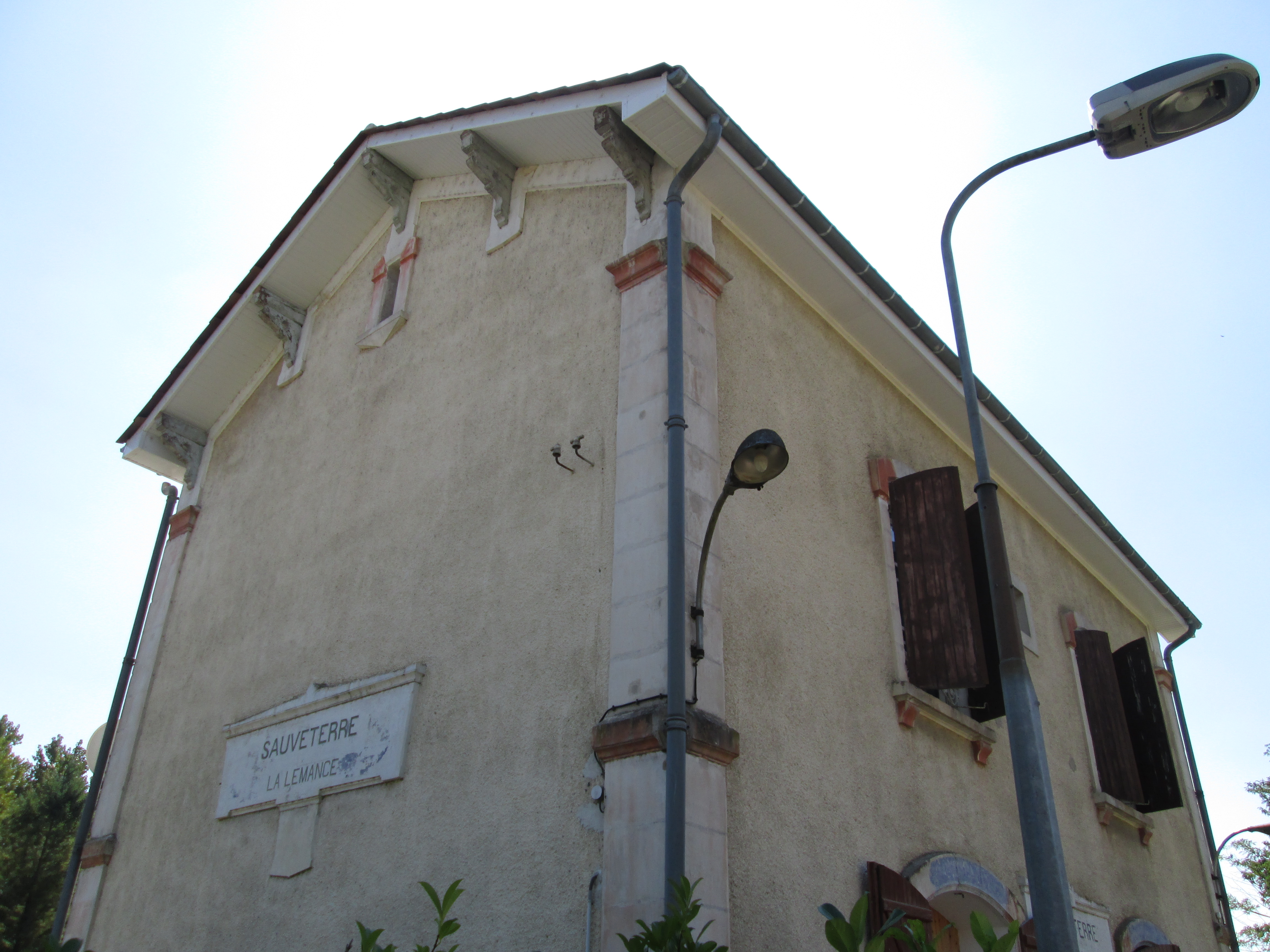
Sauveterre-la-Lémance station building

Sauveterre-la-Lémance is a railway station in Sauveterre-la-Lémance, Nouvelle-Aquitaine, France. The station is located on the Niversac - Agen railway line. The station is served by TER (local) services operated by SNCF.

== Train services ==
The following services currently call at Sauveterre-la-Lémance:

- local service (TER Nouvelle-Aquitaine) Périgueux - Le Buisson - Monsempron-Libos - Agen

| Preceding station | TER Nouvelle-Aquitaine | Following station |
|---|---|---|
| Villefranche-du-Périgord towards Périgueux | 34 | Monsempron-Libos towards Agen |
