= La Rivière-de-Mansac station =

Railway station in Mansac, France

Coordinates: 45°08′23″N 1°21′53″E

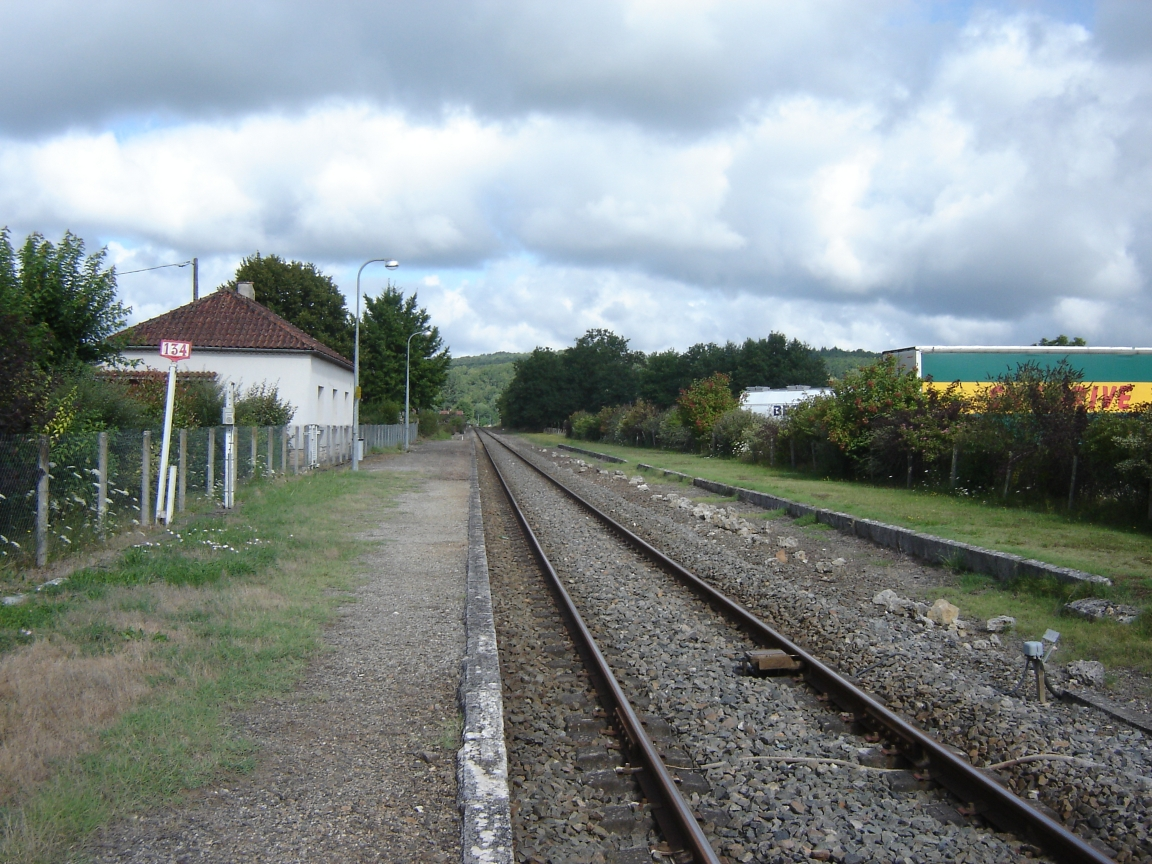
La Rivière-de-Mansac station

La Rivière-de-Mansac is a railway station in Mansac, Nouvelle-Aquitaine, France. The station is located on the Coutras - Tulle railway line. The station is served by TER (local) services operated by SNCF.

== Train services ==
The station is served by regional trains towards Bordeaux, Périgueux and Brive-la-Gaillarde.

Preceding station	TER Nouvelle-Aquitaine	Following station
Terrasson towards Bordeaux	32	Brive-la-Gaillarde towards Ussel
