= Trentels-Ladignac station =

Railway station in Trentels, France

Coordinates: 44°26′35″N 0°53′08″E

Trentels-Ladignac is a former railway station in Trentels, Nouvelle-Aquitaine, France. The station is located on the Niversac - Agen railway line. The station is served by TER Nouvelle-Aquitaine bus services on demand to Penne-d'Agenais. Train services were suspended in 2020.
