= Laroque-Timbaut station =

Railway station in Laroque-Timbaut, France

Coordinates: 44°17′14″N 0°45′00″E

Laroque-Timbaut is a railway station in Laroque-Timbaut, Nouvelle-Aquitaine, France. The station is located on the Niversac - Agen railway line. The station is served by TER (local) services operated by SNCF.

== Train services ==
The following services currently call at Laroque-Timbaut:

- local service (TER Nouvelle-Aquitaine) Périgueux - Le Buisson - Monsempron-Libos - Agen

Preceding station	TER Nouvelle-Aquitaine	Following station
Penne-d'Agenais towards Périgueux	34	Agen Terminus
