= Lamothe-Montravel station =

Railway station in Lamothe-Montravel, France

Coordinates: 44°51′13″N 0°01′15″E

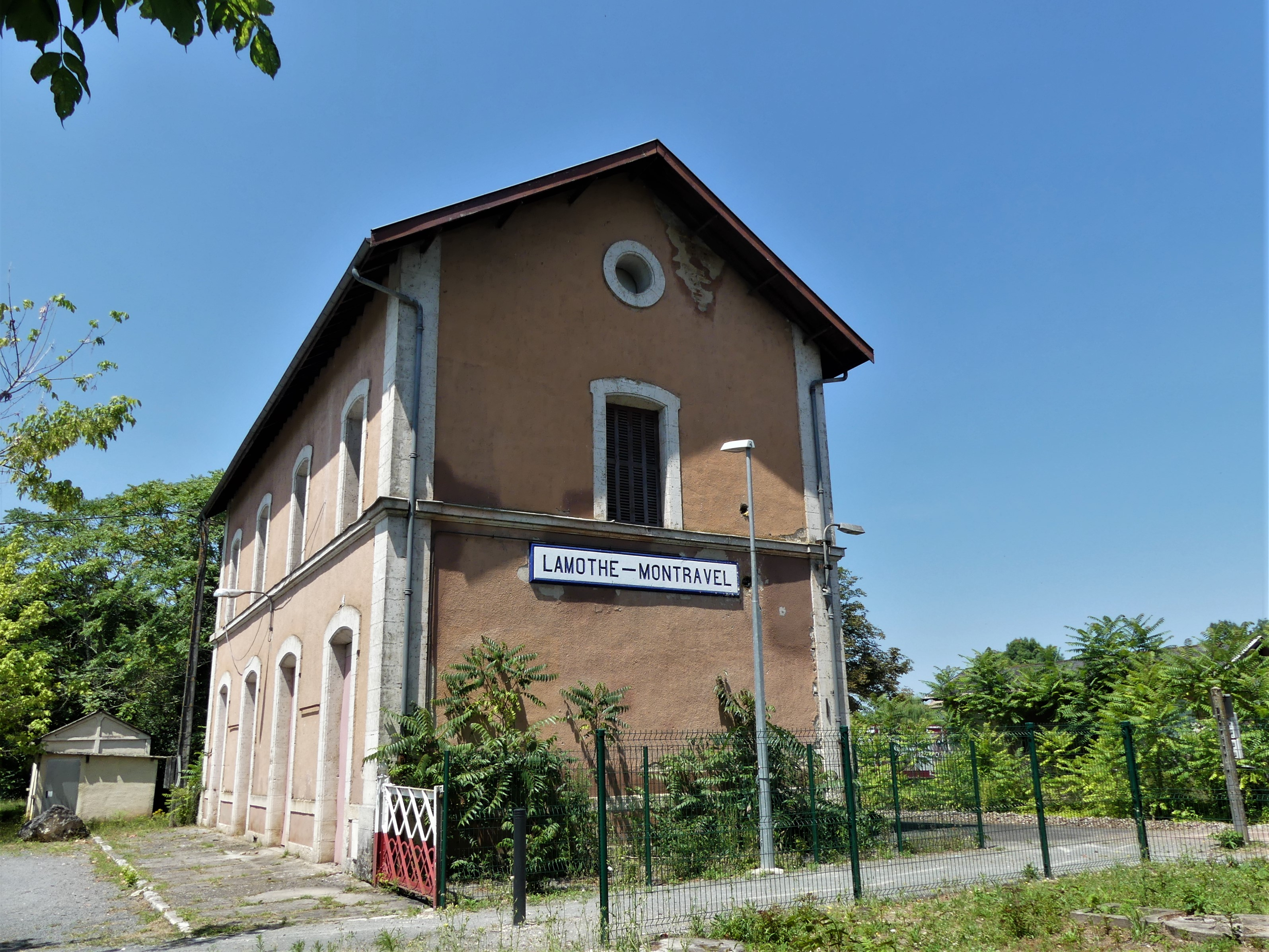
Lamothe-Montravel station building

Lamothe-Montravel is a railway station in Lamothe-Montravel, Nouvelle-Aquitaine, France. The station is located on the Libourne - Le Buisson railway line. The station is served by TER (local) services operated by SNCF.

== Train services ==
The following services currently call at Lamothe-Montravel:

- local service (TER Nouvelle-Aquitaine) Bordeaux - Libourne - Bergerac - Sarlat-la-Canéda

Preceding station	TER Nouvelle-Aquitaine	Following station
Castillon towards Bordeaux	33	Vélines towards Sarlat-la-Canéda
