= Saint-Émilion station =

Railway station in Saint-Émilion, France

Coordinates: 44°52′51″N 0°09′32″W

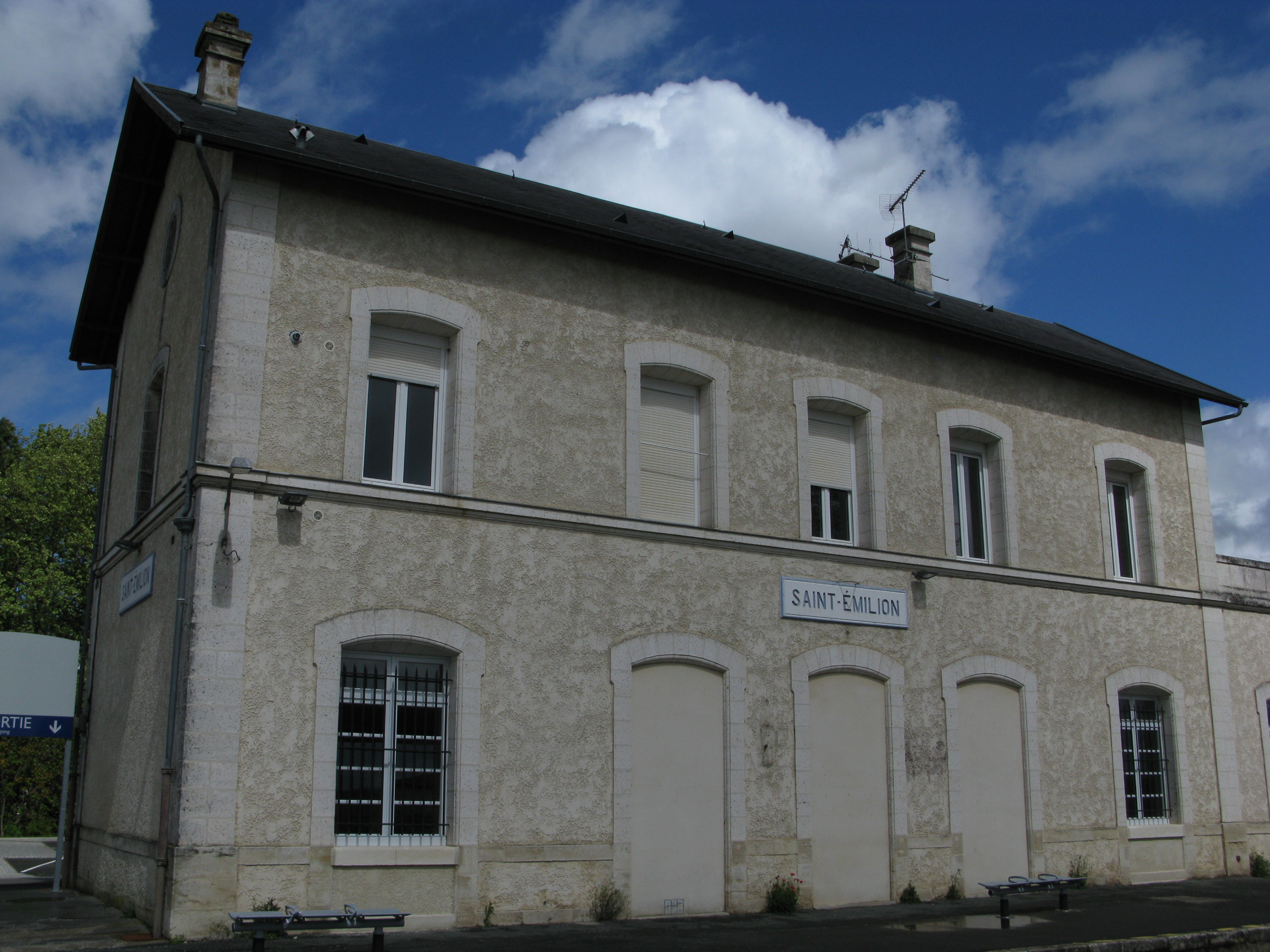
Saint-Émilion station building

Saint-Émilion is a railway station in Saint-Émilion, Nouvelle-Aquitaine, France. The station is located on the Libourne - Le Buisson railway line. The station is served by TER (local) services operated by SNCF.

== Train services ==
The following services currently call at Saint-Émilion:

- local service (TER Nouvelle-Aquitaine) Bordeaux - Libourne - Bergerac - Sarlat-la-Canéda

Preceding station	TER Nouvelle-Aquitaine	Following station
Libourne towards Bordeaux	33	Castillon towards Sarlat-la-Canéda
