= Milhac-d'Auberoche station =

Railway station in Milhac-d'Auberoche, France

Coordinates: 45°07′44″N 0°55′06″E

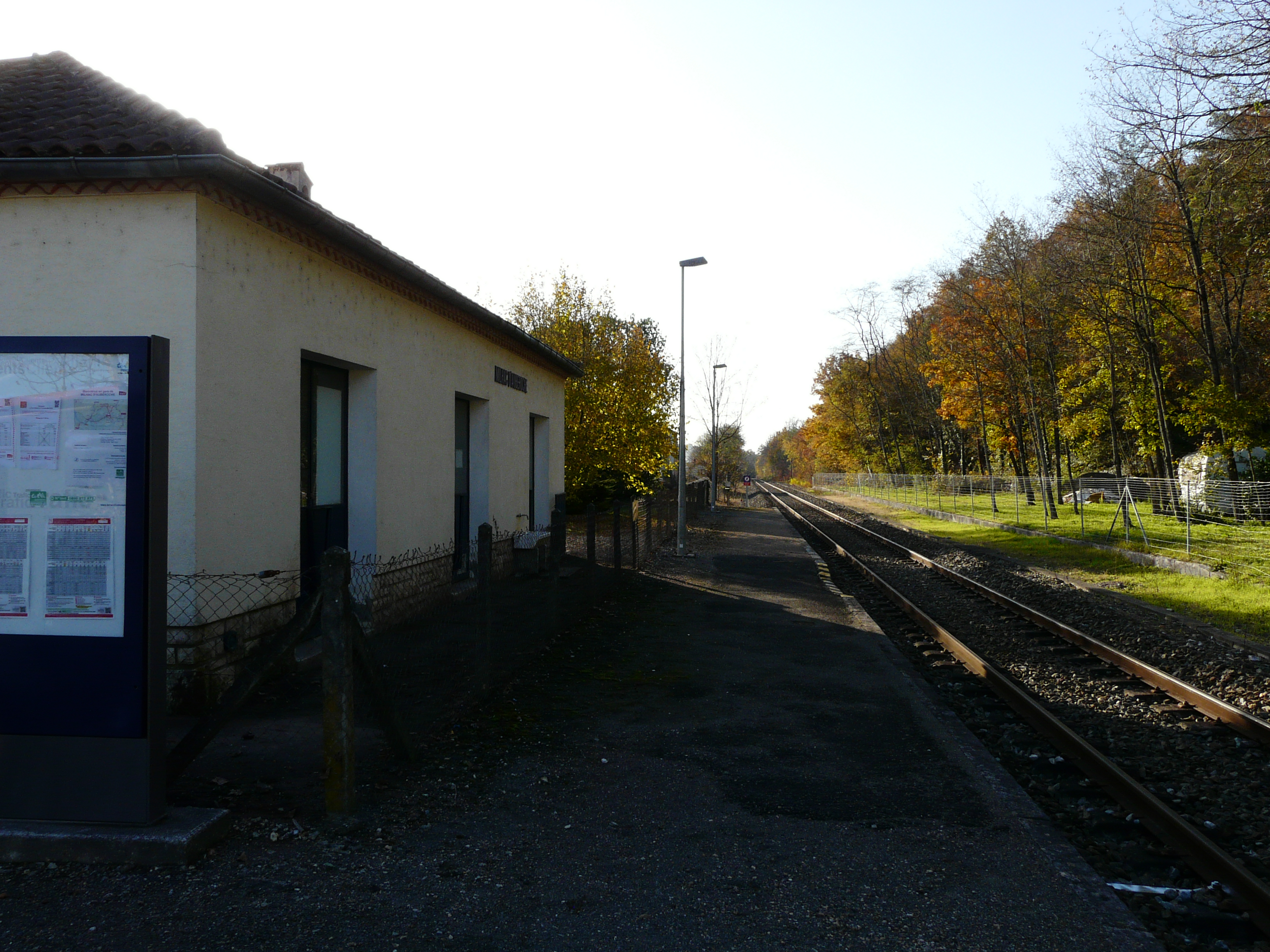
Milhac-d'Auberoche station

Milhac-d'Auberoche is a former railway station in Saint-Crépin-d'Auberoche, Nouvelle-Aquitaine, France. The station is located on the Coutras - Tulle railway line. The station is served by TER Nouvelle-Aquitaine bus services on demand to Saint-Pierre-de-Chignac. Train services were suspended in 2020.
