= Penne-d'Agenais station =

Railway station in Penne-d'Agenais, France

Coordinates: 44°22′51″N 0°48′13″E

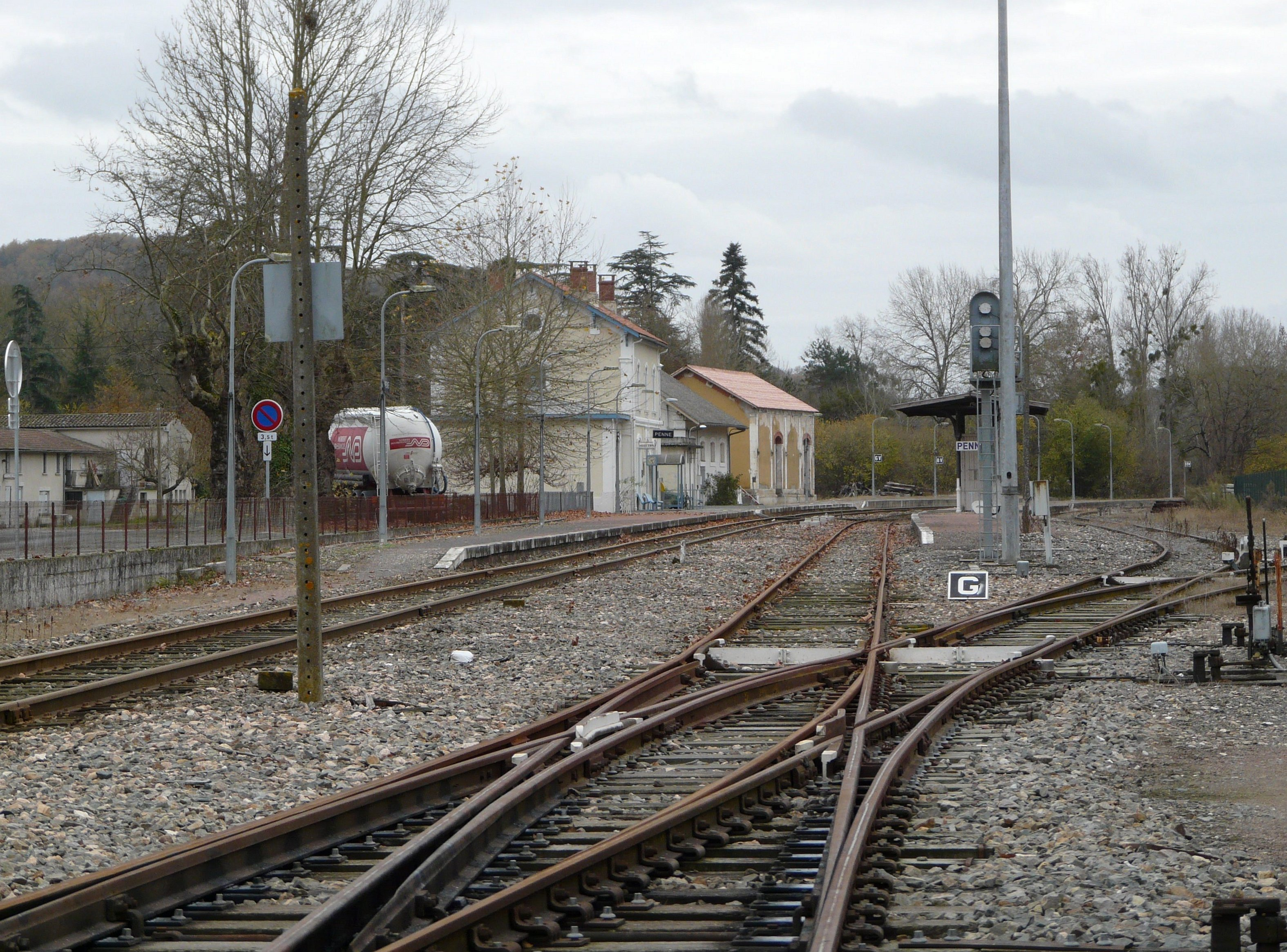
Penne-d'Agenais station

Penne-d'Agenais is a railway station in Penne-d'Agenais, Nouvelle-Aquitaine, France. The station is located on the Niversac - Agen railway line. The station is served by TER (local) services operated by SNCF.

== Train services ==
The following services currently call at Penne-d'Agenais:

- local service (TER Nouvelle-Aquitaine) Périgueux - Le Buisson - Monsempron-Libos - Agen

Preceding station	TER Nouvelle-Aquitaine	Following station
Monsempron-Libos towards Périgueux	34	Laroque-Timbaut towards Agen
