= Pont-du-Casse station =

Railway station in Pont-du-Casse, France

Coordinates: 44°13′58″N 0°42′32″E

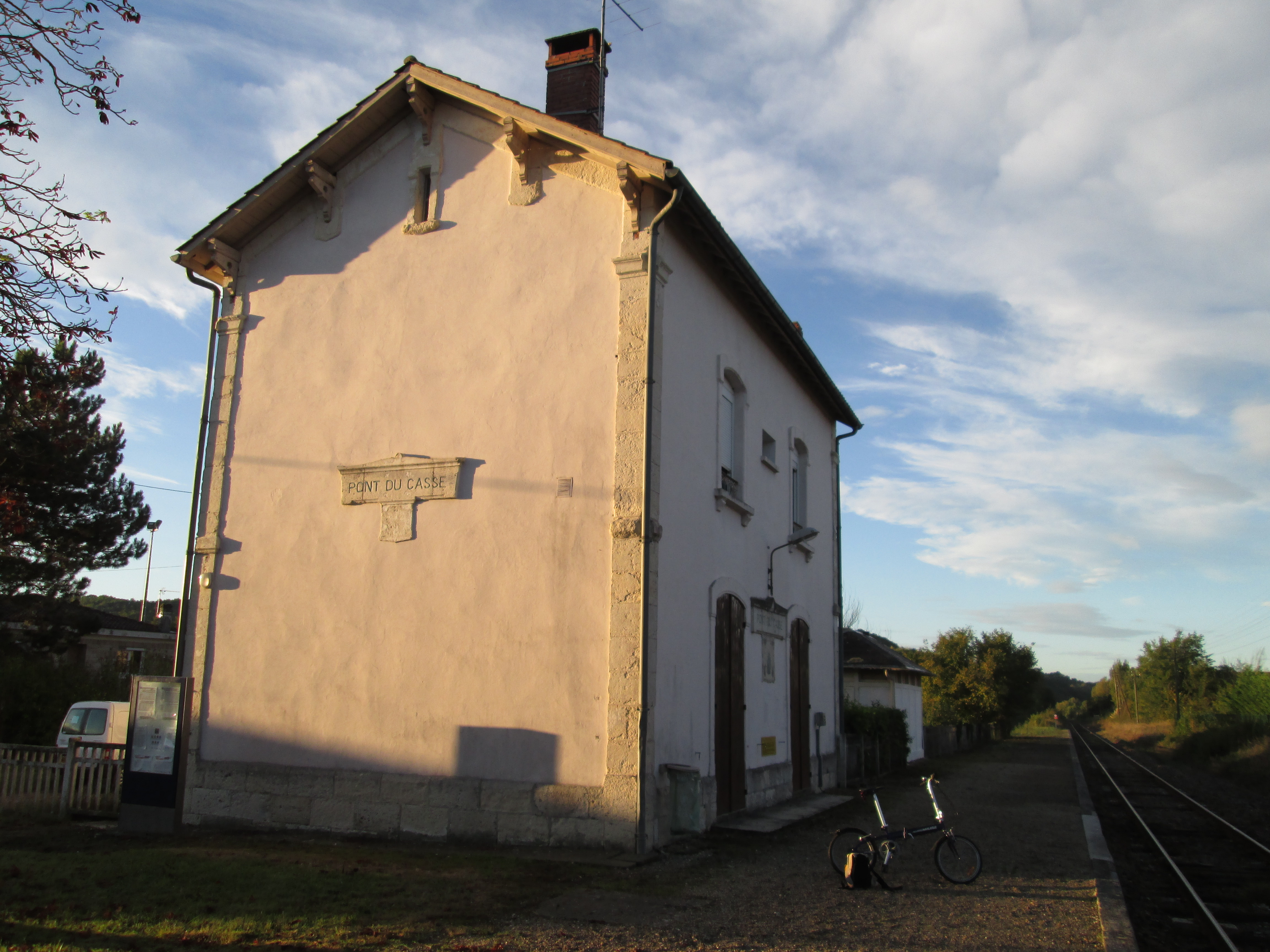
Station building in 2014.

Pont-du-Casse is a former railway station in Pont-du-Casse, Nouvelle-Aquitaine, France. The station is located on the Niversac - Agen railway line. The station was served by TER (local) services between Agen and Périgueux. It was closed in December 2020.
