= Jatxou station =

Railway station in Jatxou, France

Coordinates: 43°23′29″N 1°26′44″W

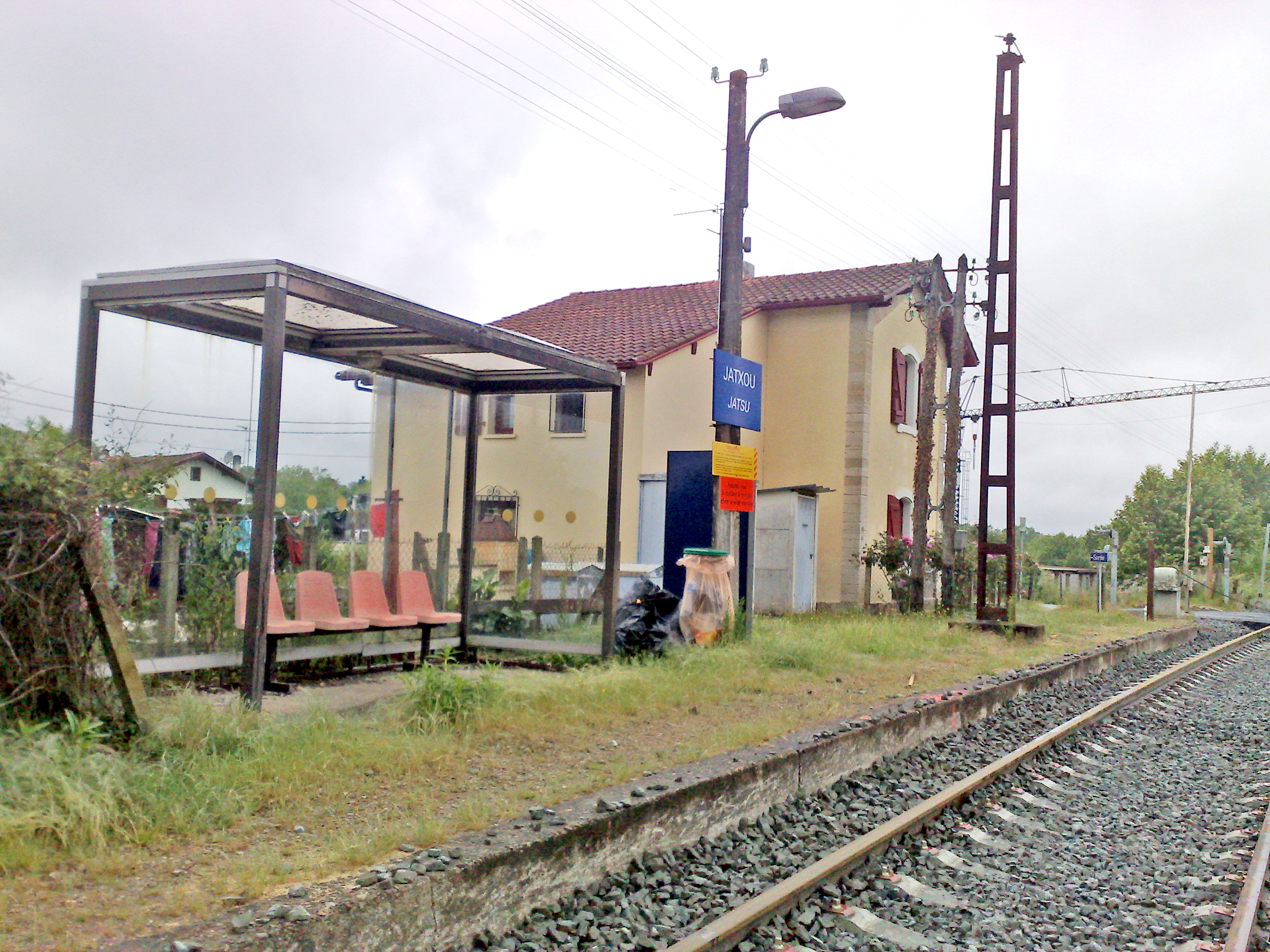
Jatxou station

Jatxou or Jatsu is a former railway station in Jatxou, Nouvelle-Aquitaine, France. The station was opened in 1891 and is located on the Bayonne - Saint-Jean-Pied-de-Port railway line. The station is served by TER (local) services operated by the SNCF. It was closed in 2019.
