= Ychoux =

- Commune
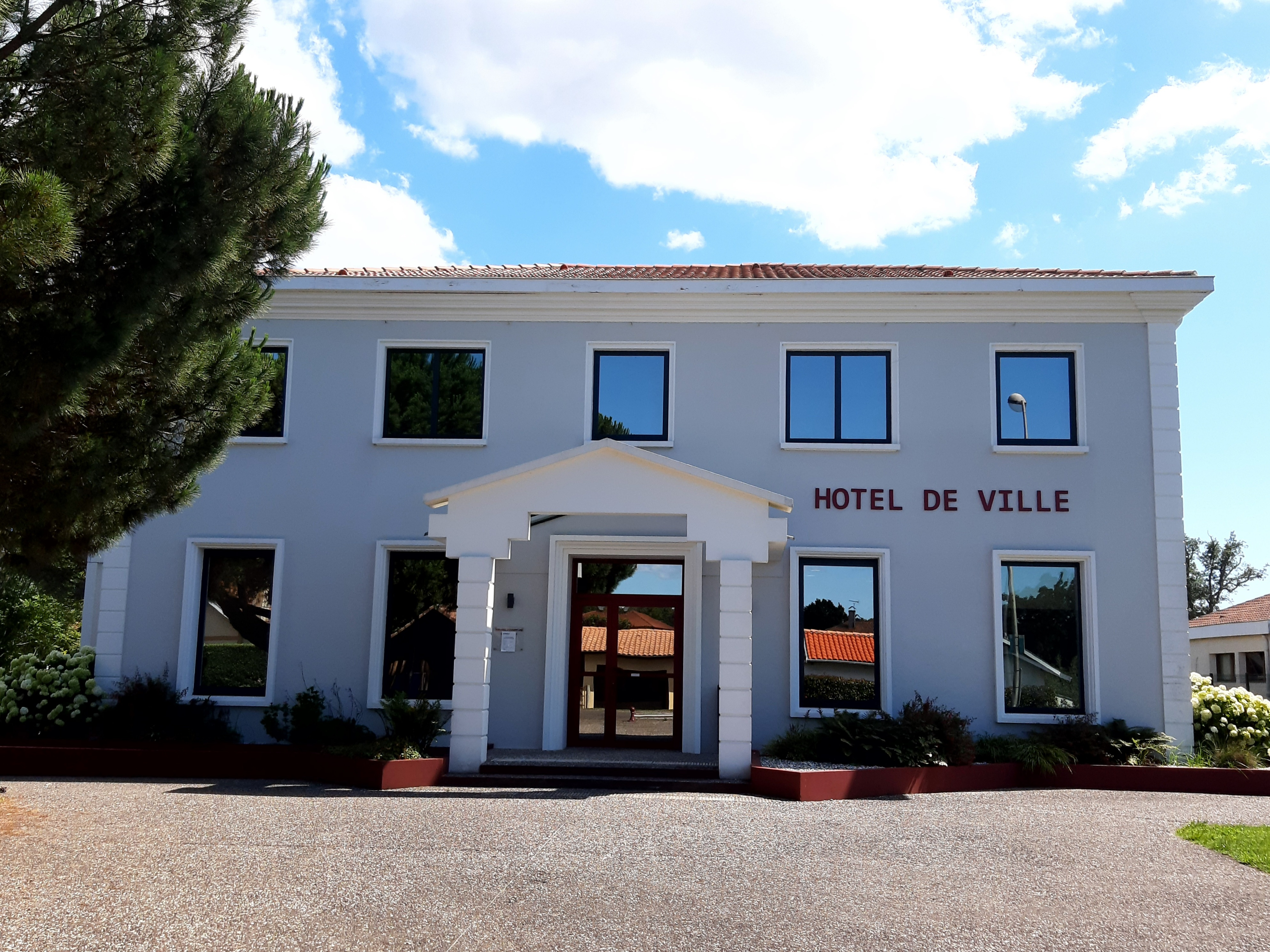
- Town hall
- Location of Ychoux
- Location within France Location within Nouvelle-Aquitaine
- Coordinates: 44°19′42″N 0°57′25″W
- Country: France
- Region: Nouvelle-Aquitaine
- Department: Landes
- Arrondissement: Mont-de-Marsan
- Canton: Grands Lacs
- Intercommunality: Grands Lacs

Government
  - Mayor (2020–2026): Vincent Castagnède
- Area^{1}: 111.28 km^{2} (42.97 sq mi)
- Highest elevation: 71 m (233 ft)
- Lowest elevation: 37 m (121 ft)
- Population (2023): 2,338
  - Density: 21.01/km^{2} (54.42/sq mi)
- Time zone: UTC+01:00 (CET)
  - Summer (DST): UTC+02:00 (CEST)
- INSEE/Postal code: 40332 /40160
- ^{1} French Land Register data, which excludes lakes, ponds, glaciers > 1 km^{2} (0.386 sq mi or 247 acres) and river estuaries.

Ychoux (French pronunciation: [iʃuks]; Occitan: Ishós) is a commune in the Landes department, Nouvelle-Aquitaine, southwestern France.

== Population ==
Historical population
Year	Pop.	±% p.a.
1968	1,072	—
1975	1,349	+3.34%
1982	1,514	+1.66%
1990	1,586	+0.58%
1999	1,485	−0.73%
2007	1,690	+1.63%
2012	2,118	+4.62%
2017	2,281	+1.49%
2023	2,338	+0.41%
Source: INSEE

== See also ==
- Communes of the Landes department
