= Itxassou station =

Railway station in Itxassou, France

Coordinates: 43°19′39″N 1°23′21″W

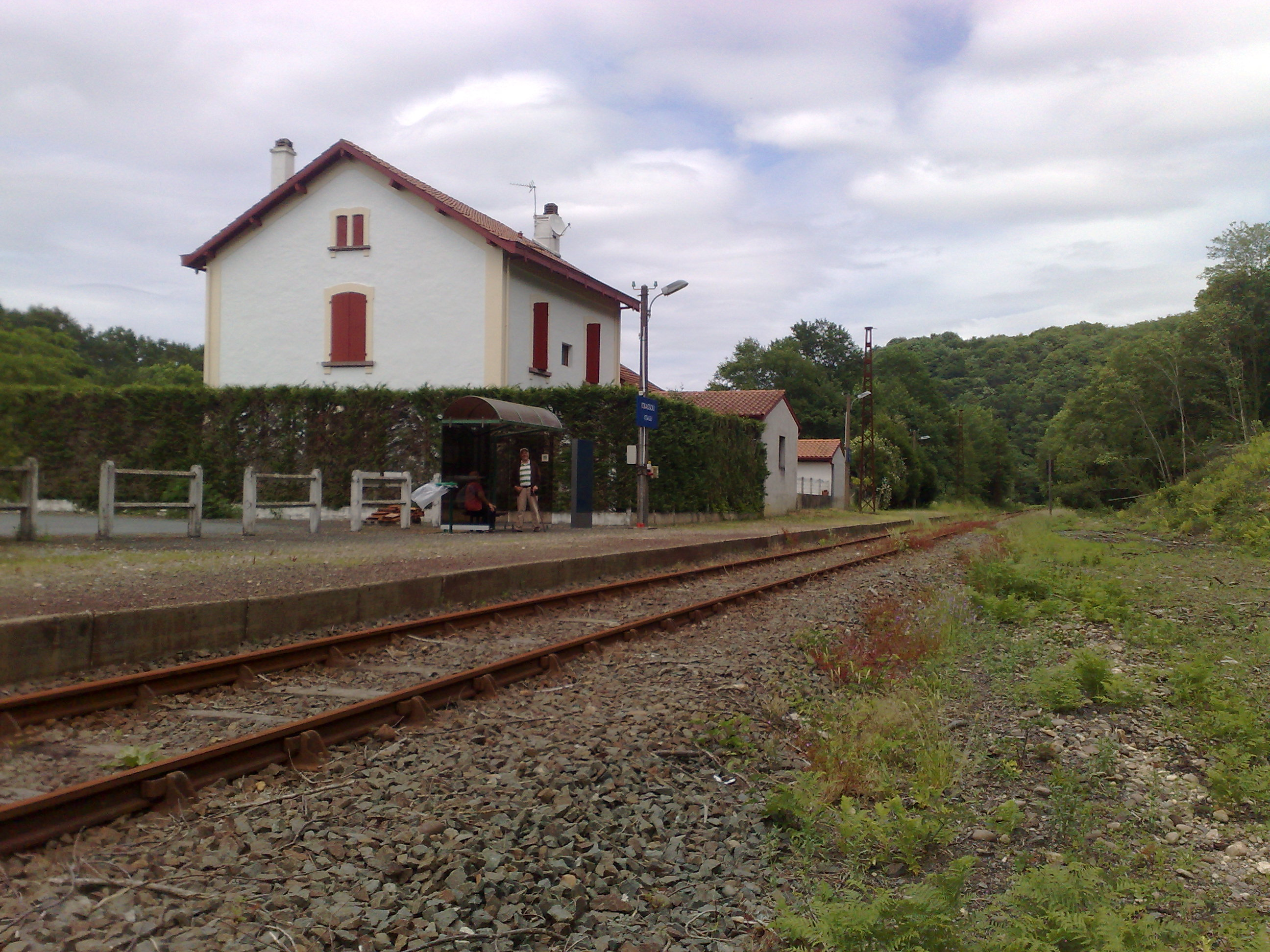
Itxassou station

Itxassou or Itsasu is a railway station in Itxassou, Nouvelle-Aquitaine, France. The station was opened in 1891 and is located on the Bayonne - Saint-Jean-Pied-de-Port railway line. The station is served by TER (local) services operated by the SNCF. It was closed in 2019 and reopened in 2022.
