= Lamothe-Montravel =

- Commune
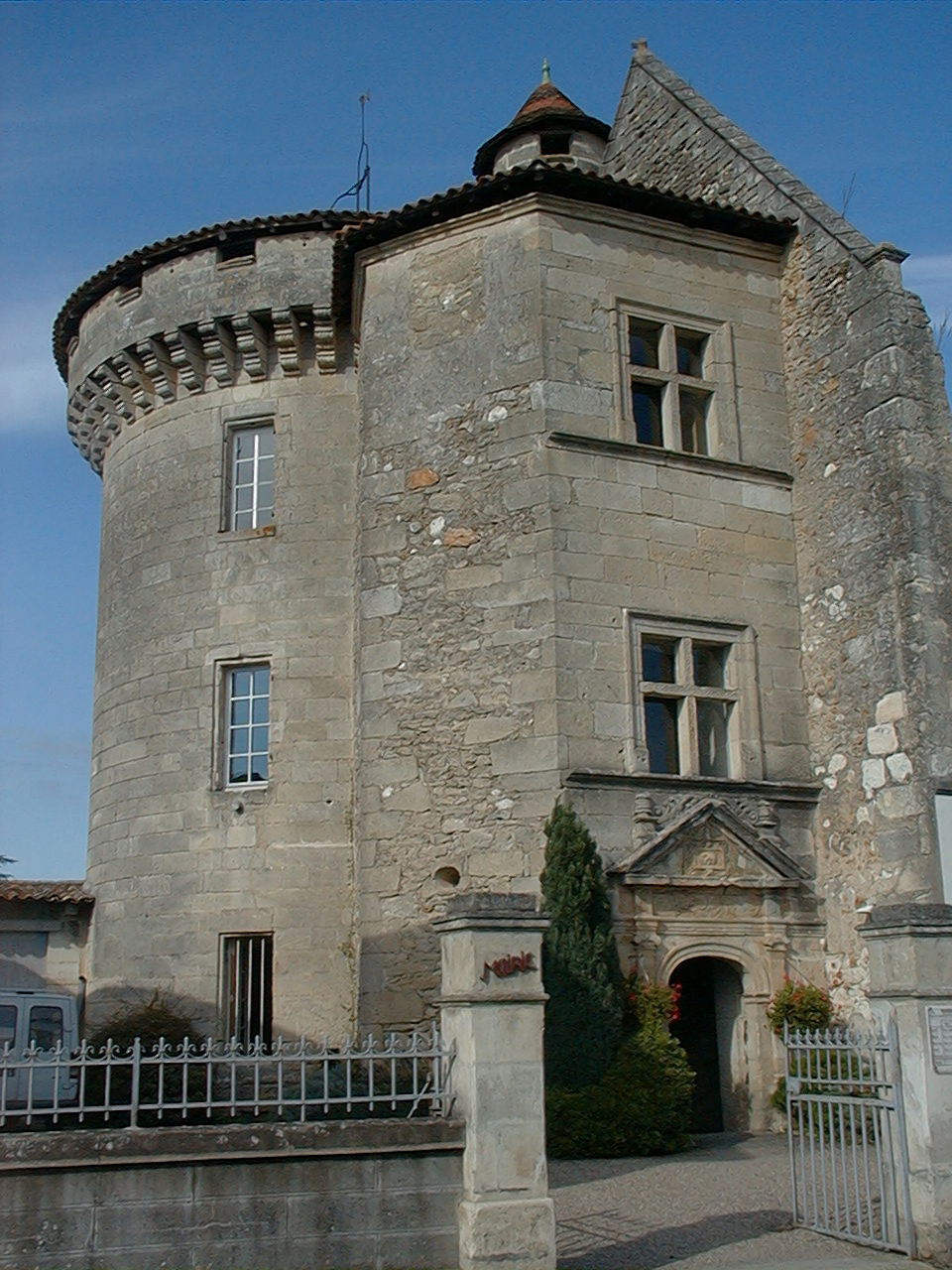
- Chateau

- Coat of arms
- Location of Lamothe-Montravel
- Location within France Location within Nouvelle-Aquitaine
- Coordinates: 44°51′08″N 0°01′34″E
- Country: France
- Region: Nouvelle-Aquitaine
- Department: Dordogne
- Arrondissement: Bergerac
- Canton: Pays de Montaigne et Gurson
- Intercommunality: Montaigne Montravel et Gurson

Government
  - Mayor (2020–2026): Michel Frichou
- Area^{1}: 11.63 km^{2} (4.49 sq mi)
- Elevation: 20 m (66 ft)
- Highest elevation: 89 m (292 ft)
- Lowest elevation: 2 m (6.6 ft)
- Population (2023): 1,443
  - Density: 124.1/km^{2} (321.4/sq mi)
- Time zone: UTC+01:00 (CET)
  - Summer (DST): UTC+02:00 (CEST)
- INSEE/Postal code: 24226 /24230
- ^{1} French Land Register data, which excludes lakes, ponds, glaciers > 1 km^{2} (0.386 sq mi or 247 acres) and river estuaries.

Lamothe-Montravel (French pronunciation: [lamɔt mɔ̃tʁavɛl]; Occitan: La Mòta de Montravèl) is a commune in the Dordogne department in Nouvelle-Aquitaine in southwestern France. Lamothe-Montravel station has rail connections to Bordeaux, Bergerac and Sarlat-la-Canéda.

== Population ==
Historical population
| Year | Pop. | ±% p.a. |
|---|---|---|
| 1968 | 914 | — |
| 1975 | 896 | −0.28% |
| 1982 | 950 | +0.84% |
| 1990 | 1,093 | +1.77% |
| 1999 | 1,145 | +0.52% |
| 2007 | 1,307 | +1.67% |
| 2012 | 1,259 | −0.75% |
| 2017 | 1,330 | +1.10% |
| 2023 | 1,443 | +1.37% |
Source: INSEE

== See also ==
- Communes of the Dordogne department
