= Terrasson station =

Railway station in Terrasson-Lavilledieu, France

Coordinates: 45°08′08″N 1°18′02″E

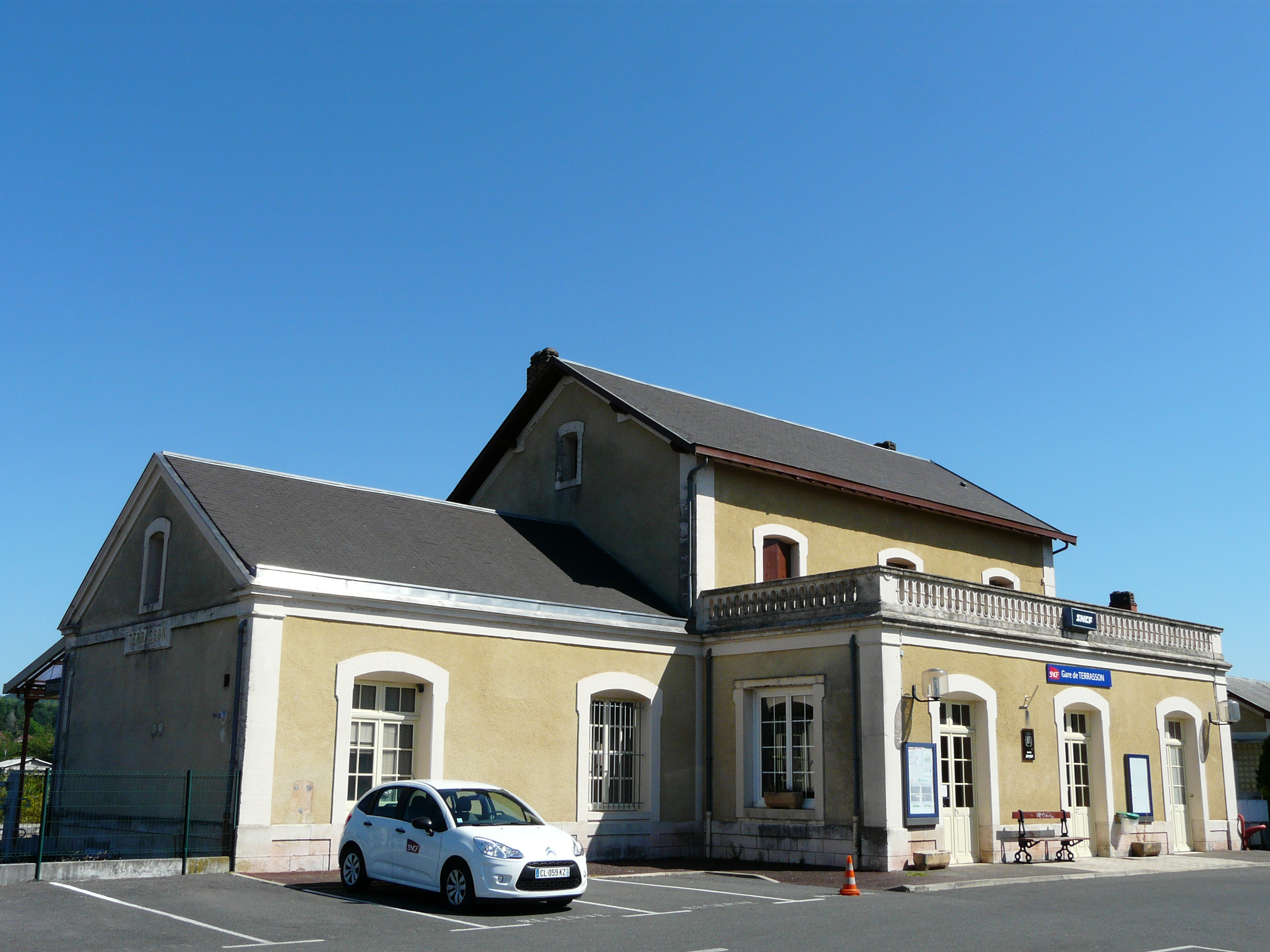
Gare de Terrasson

Terrasson is a railway station in Terrasson-Lavilledieu, Nouvelle-Aquitaine, France. The station is located on the Coutras - Tulle railway line. The station is served by TER (local) services operated by SNCF.

== Train services ==
The station is served by regional trains to Bordeaux, Périgueux, Brive-la-Gaillarde and Ussel.

Preceding station	TER Nouvelle-Aquitaine	Following station
Condat-Le Lardin towards Bordeaux	32	La Rivière-de-Mansac towards Ussel
