= Monsempron-Libos station =

Railway station in Monsempron-Libos, France

Coordinates: 44°29′10″N 0°56′26″E

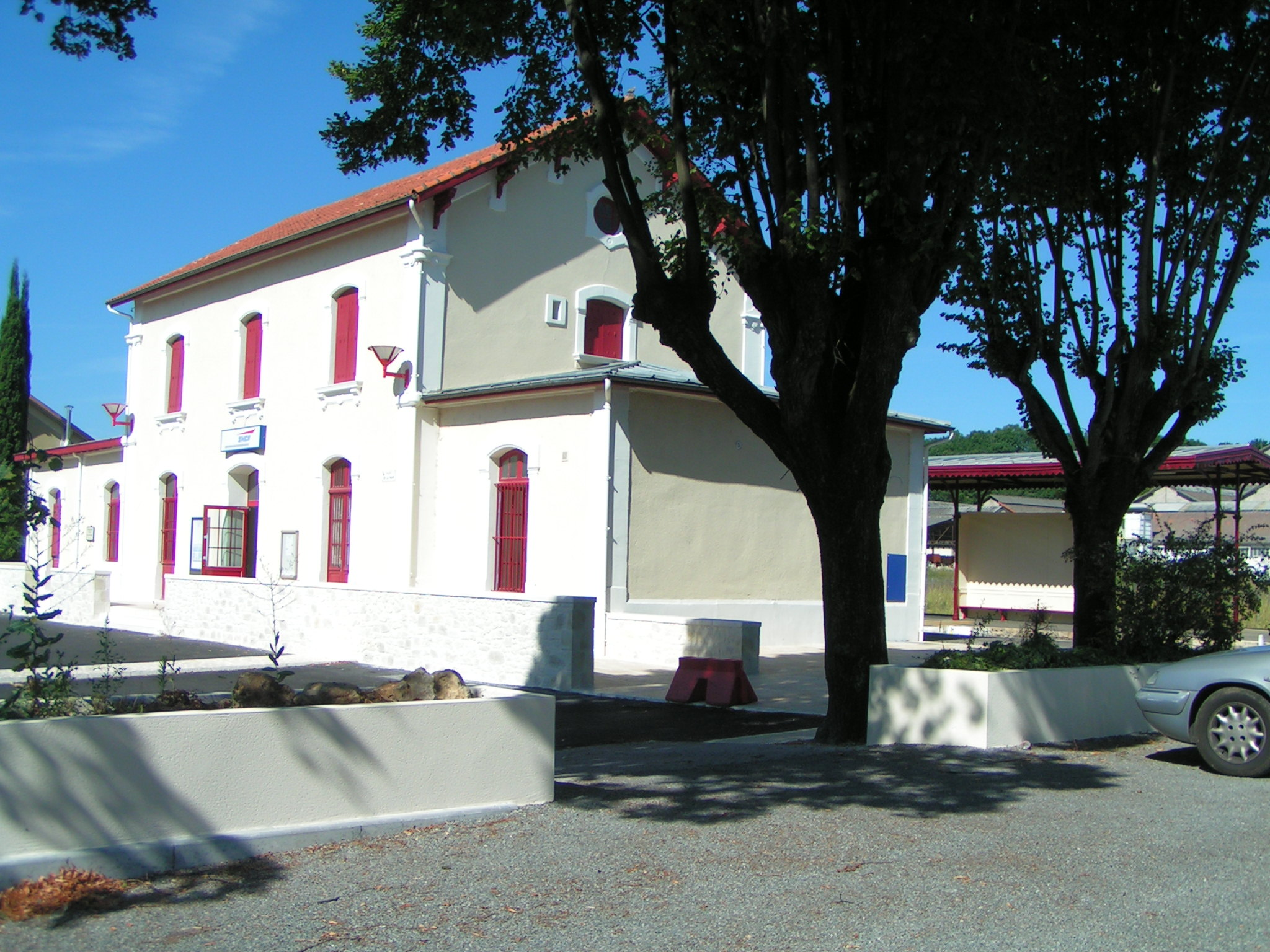
Monsempron-Libos railway station

Monsempron-Libos is a railway station in Monsempron-Libos, Nouvelle-Aquitaine, France. The station is located on the Niversac - Agen railway line. The station is served by TER (local) services operated by SNCF. The station was also on the Monsempron-Libos - Cahors railway line, which is now closed.

== Train services ==
The following services currently call at Monsempron-Libos:

- local service (TER Nouvelle-Aquitaine) Périgueux - Le Buisson - Monsempron-Libos - Agen

Preceding station	TER Nouvelle-Aquitaine	Following station
Sauveterre-la-Lémance towards Périgueux	34	Penne-d'Agenais towards Agen

== Gallery ==
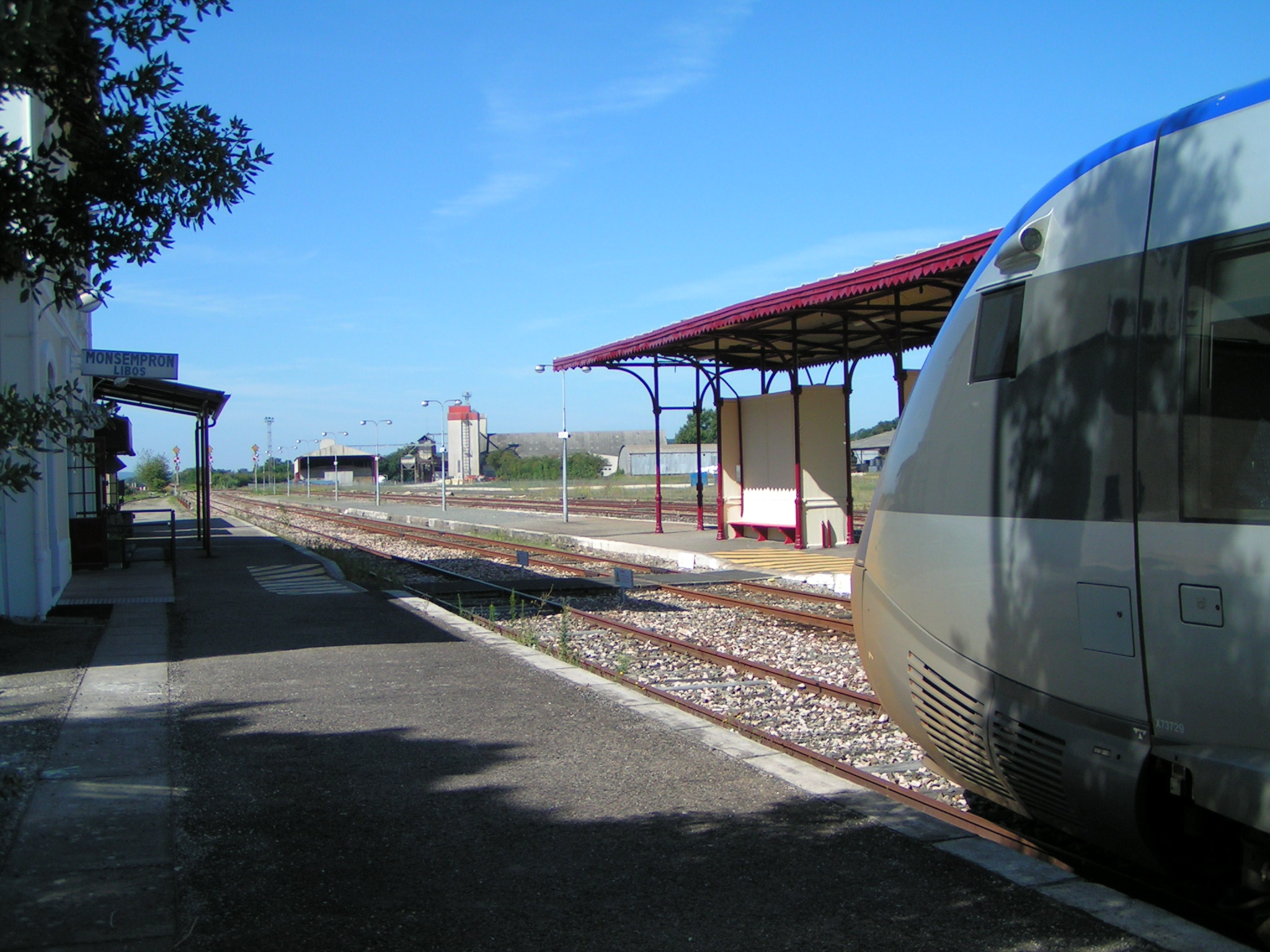
A train waiting at the station
