= Castillon station =

Railway station in Castillon-la-Bataille, France

Coordinates: 44°51′26″N 0°02′26″W

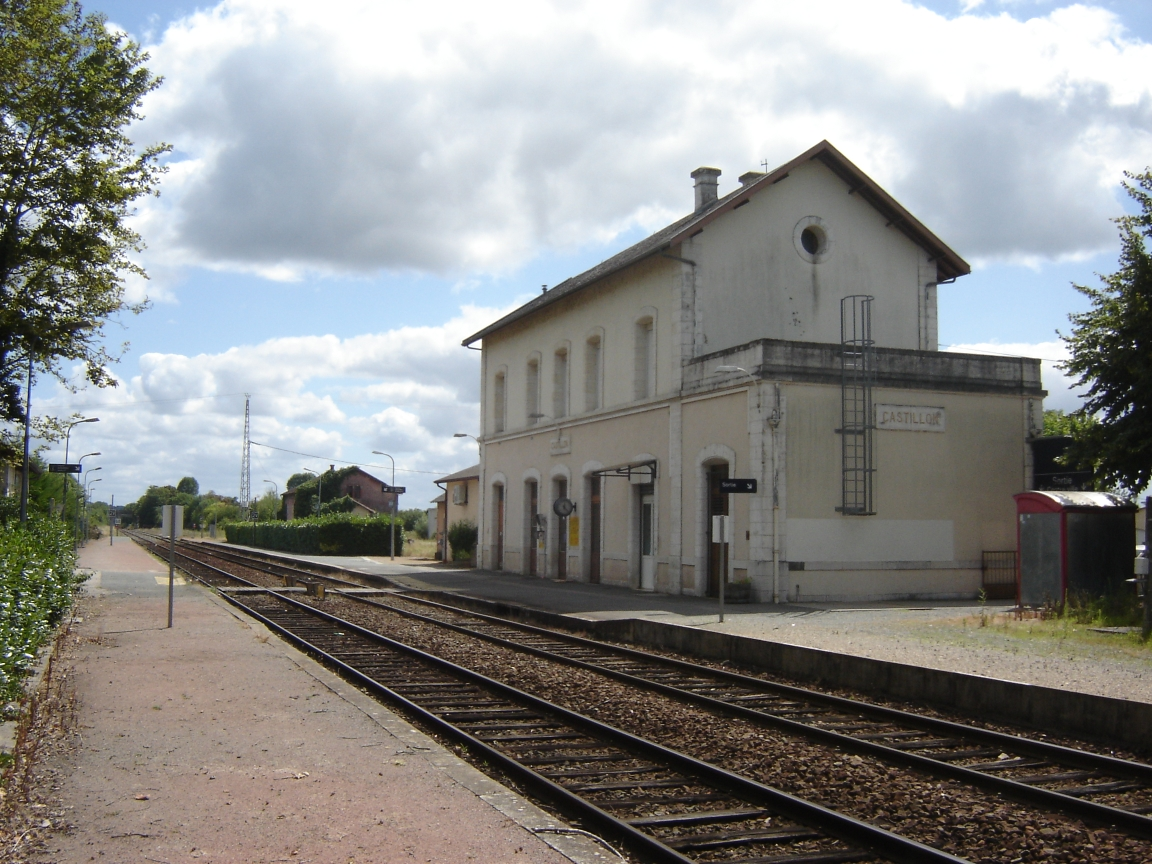
Castillon station

Castillon is a railway station in Castillon-la-Bataille, Nouvelle-Aquitaine, France. The station is located on the Libourne - Le Buisson railway line. The station is served by TER (local) services operated by SNCF.

== Train services ==
The following services currently call at Castillon:

- local service (TER Nouvelle-Aquitaine) Bordeaux - Libourne - Bergerac - Sarlat-la-Canéda

Preceding station	TER Nouvelle-Aquitaine	Following station
Saint-Émilion towards Bordeaux	33	Lamothe-Montravel towards Sarlat-la-Canéda
