= La Cave station =

Railway station in Marsac-sur-l'Isle, France

Coordinates: 45°11′01″N 0°37′40″E

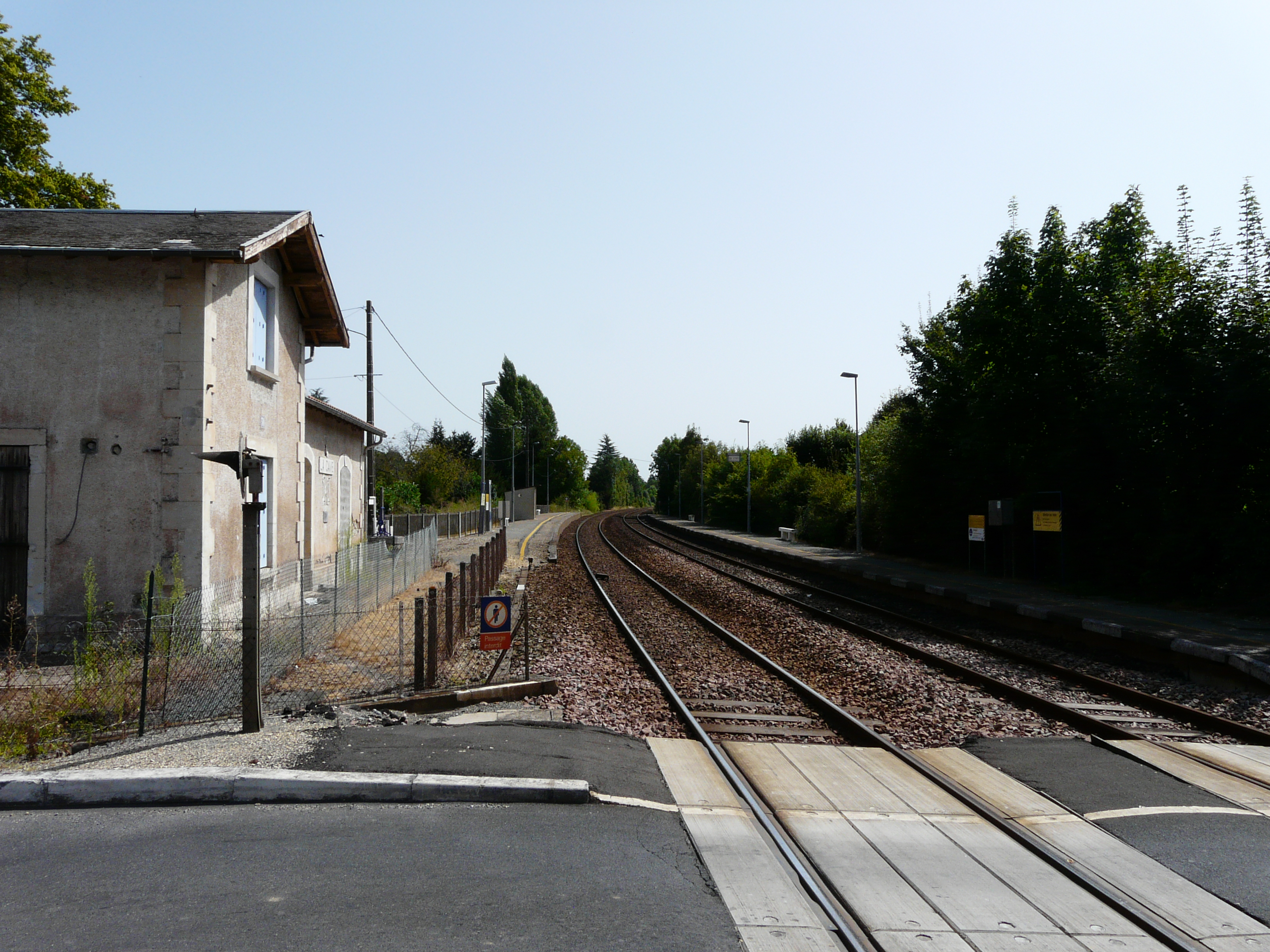
La Cave station

La Cave is a former railway station in La Cave, Nouvelle-Aquitaine, France. The station is located on the Coutras - Tulle railway line. The station was served by TER (local) services operated by SNCF on the line between Bordeaux and Périgueux. It was closed in 2017.
