= Marsac station (Dordogne) =

Railway station in France

Coordinates: 45°11′09″N 0°39′43″E

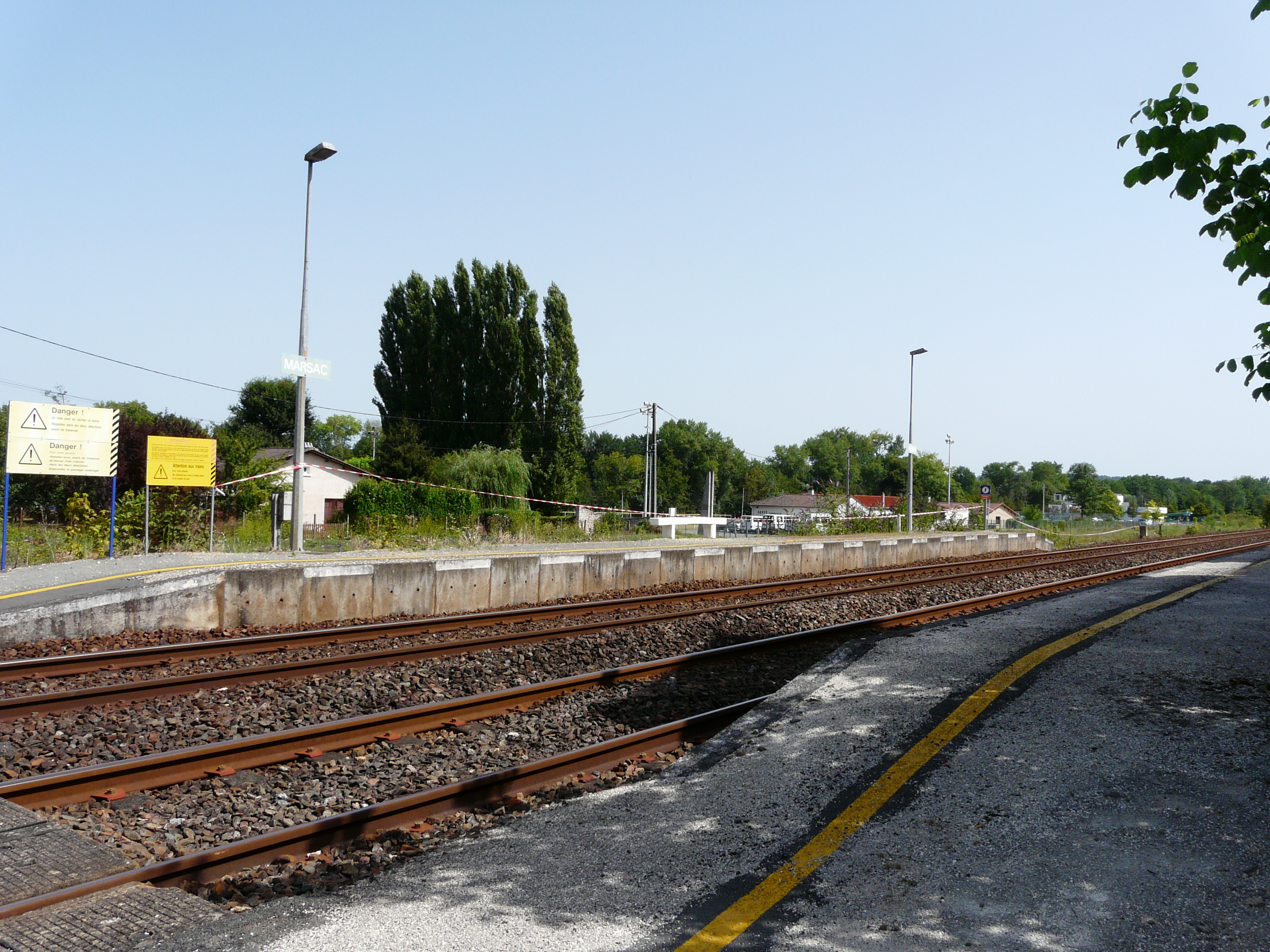
Marsac station

Marsac is a former railway station in Marsac-sur-l'Isle, Aquitaine, France. The station is located on the Coutras - Tulle railway line. The station was served by TER (local) services operated by SNCF.

The station has been suspended until further notice since 2012.
