= Belvès station =

Railway station in Belvès, France

Coordinates: 44.77732283569035°N 1.0118798583907116°E

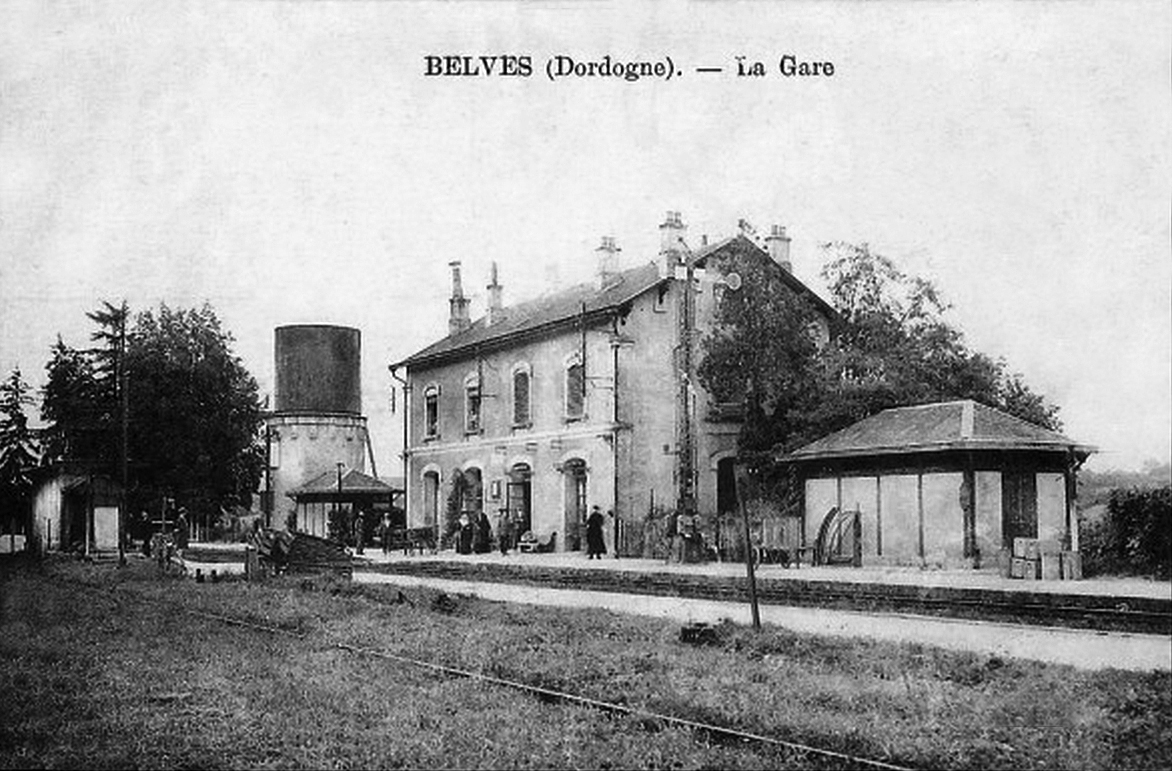
Belvès station around 1900.

Belvès is a railway station in Belvès, Nouvelle-Aquitaine, France. The station is located on the Niversac - Agen railway line. The station is served by TER (local) services operated by SNCF.

== Train services ==
The following services currently call at Belvès:

- local service (TER Nouvelle-Aquitaine) Périgueux - Le Buisson - Monsempron-Libos - Agen

Preceding station	TER Nouvelle-Aquitaine	Following station
Siorac-en-Périgord towards Périgueux	34	Villefranche-du-Périgord towards Agen
