= Villefranche-du-Périgord station =

Railway station in Villefranche-du-Périgord, France

Coordinates: 44°37′36″N 1°02′57″E

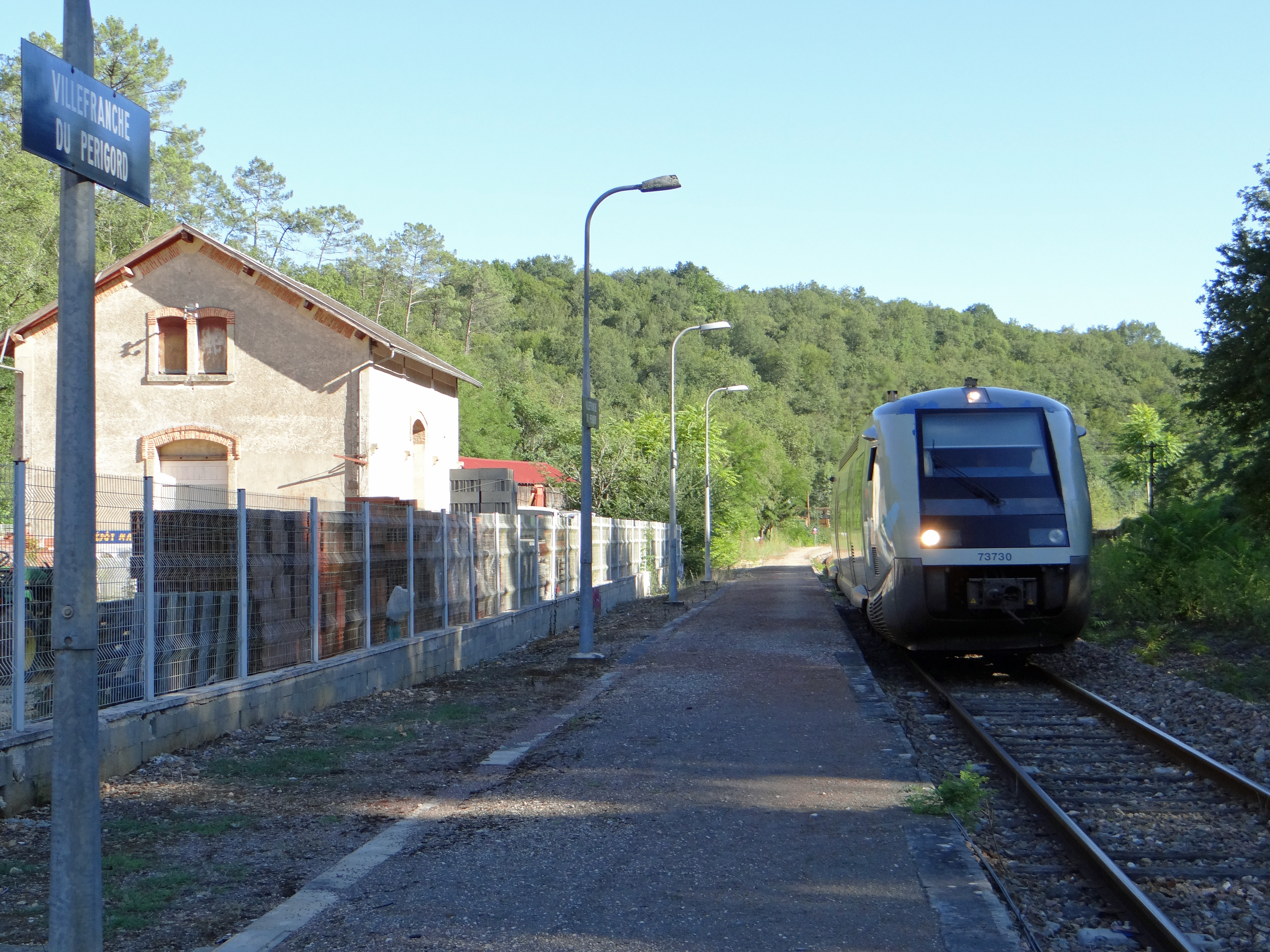
The station

Villefranche-du-Périgord is a railway station in Villefranche-du-Périgord, Nouvelle-Aquitaine, France. The station is located on the Niversac - Agen railway line. The station is served by TER (local) services operated by SNCF.

== Train services ==
The following services currently call at Villefranche-du-Périgord:

- local service (TER Nouvelle-Aquitaine) Périgueux - Le Buisson - Monsempron-Libos - Agen

Preceding station	TER Nouvelle-Aquitaine	Following station
Belvès towards Périgueux	34	Sauveterre-la-Lémance towards Agen
