= Périgueux-Saint-Georges station =

Railway station in Périgueux, France

Coordinates: 45°10′42″N 0°44′01″E

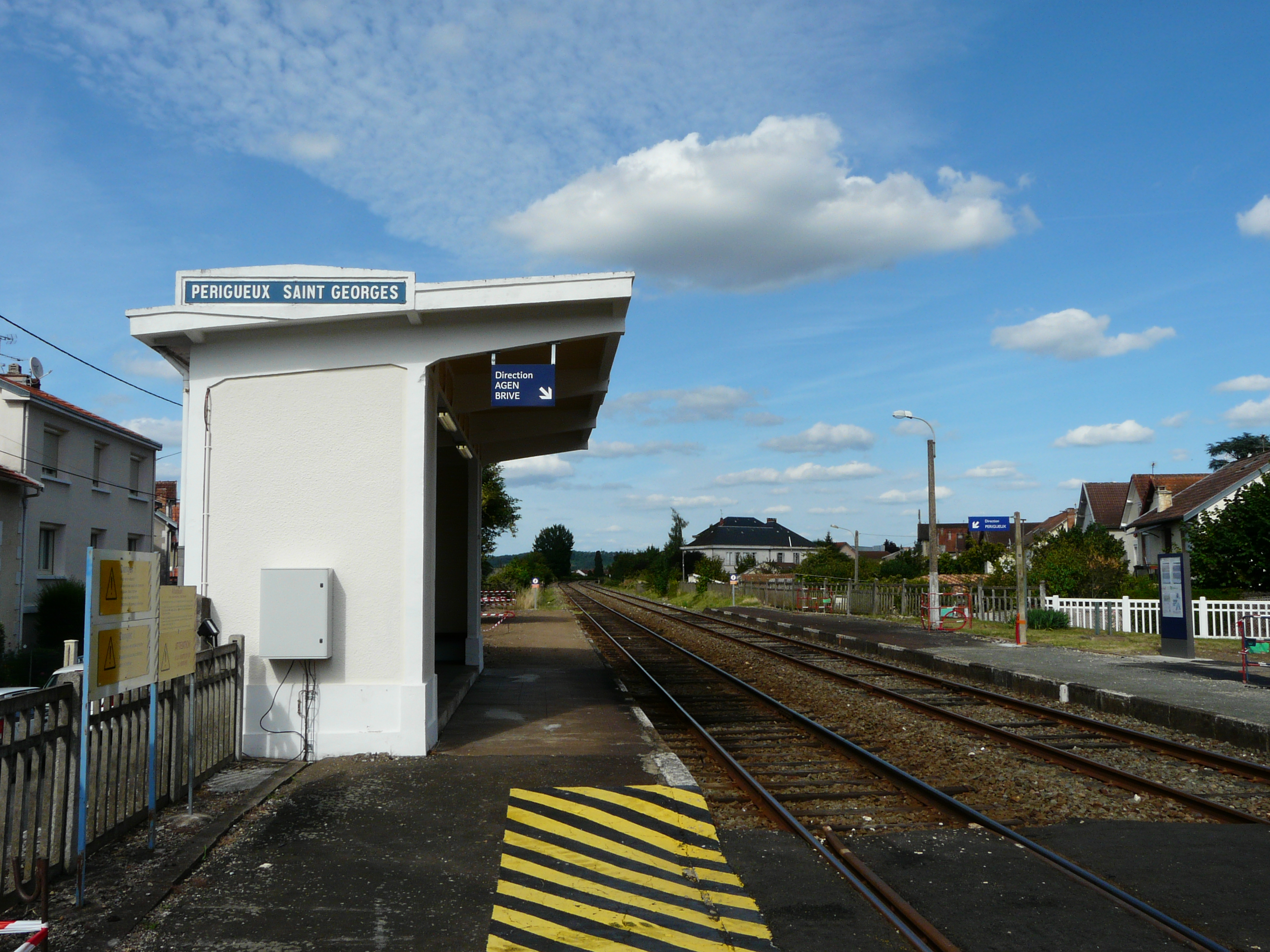
platform, Périgueux-Saint-Georges

Périgueux-Saint-Georges is a former railway station in Périgueux, Aquitaine, France. The station is located on the Coutras - Tulle railway line. The station was served by TER (local) services between Périgueux and Agen operated by SNCF. It was closed in 2017.
