= Douzillac station =

Railway station in Douzillac, France

Coordinates: 45°04′46″N 0°25′00″E

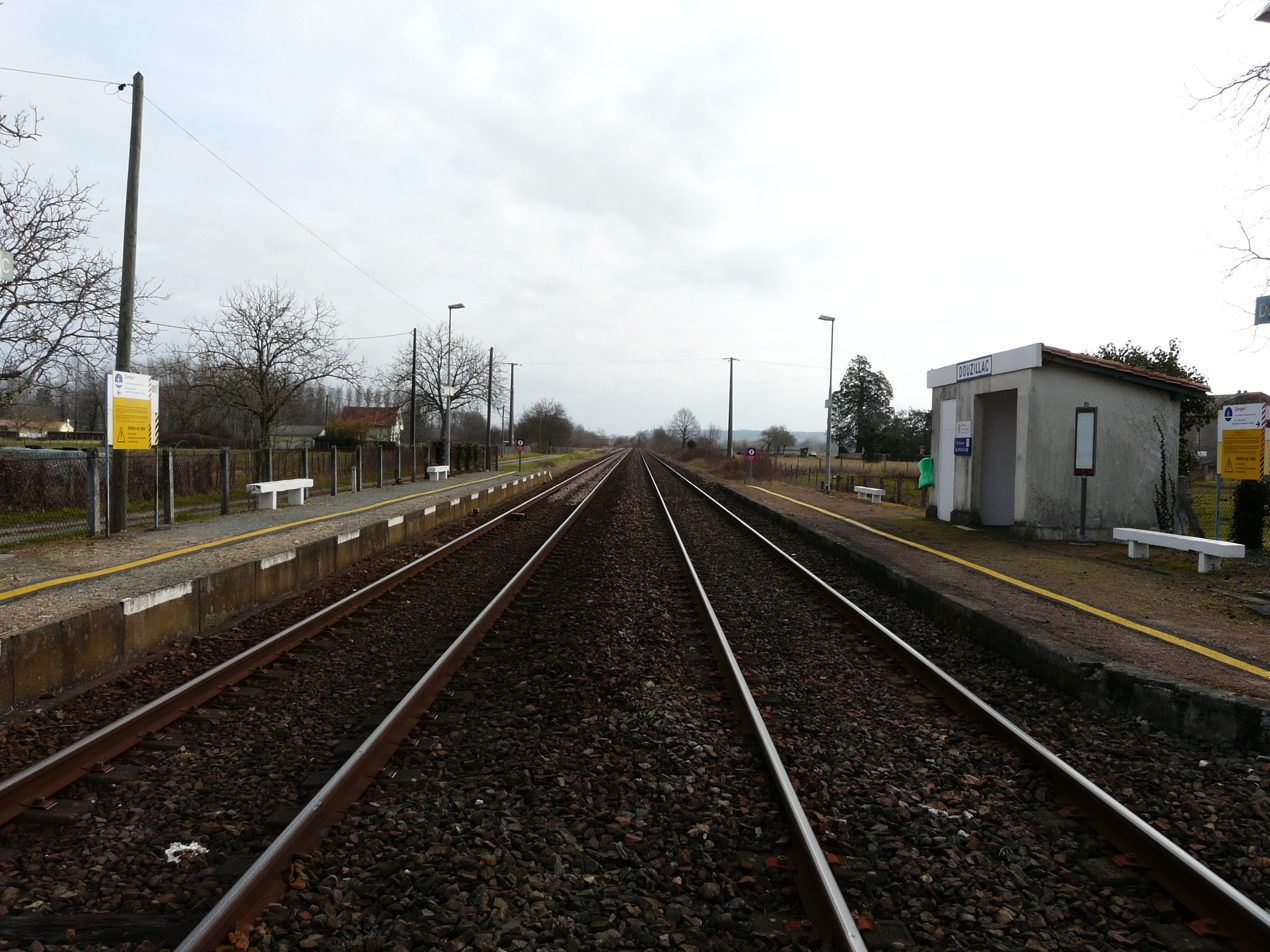
Douzillac station

Douzillac is a former railway station in Douzillac, Nouvelle-Aquitaine, France. The station is located on the Coutras - Tulle railway line. The station was served by TER (local) services operated by SNCF between Bordeaux and Périgueux. The station was served by 2 trains per day in each direction. It was closed in 2017.
