= Larche station =

Railway station in Larche, France

Coordinates: 45°07′54″N 1°24′57″E

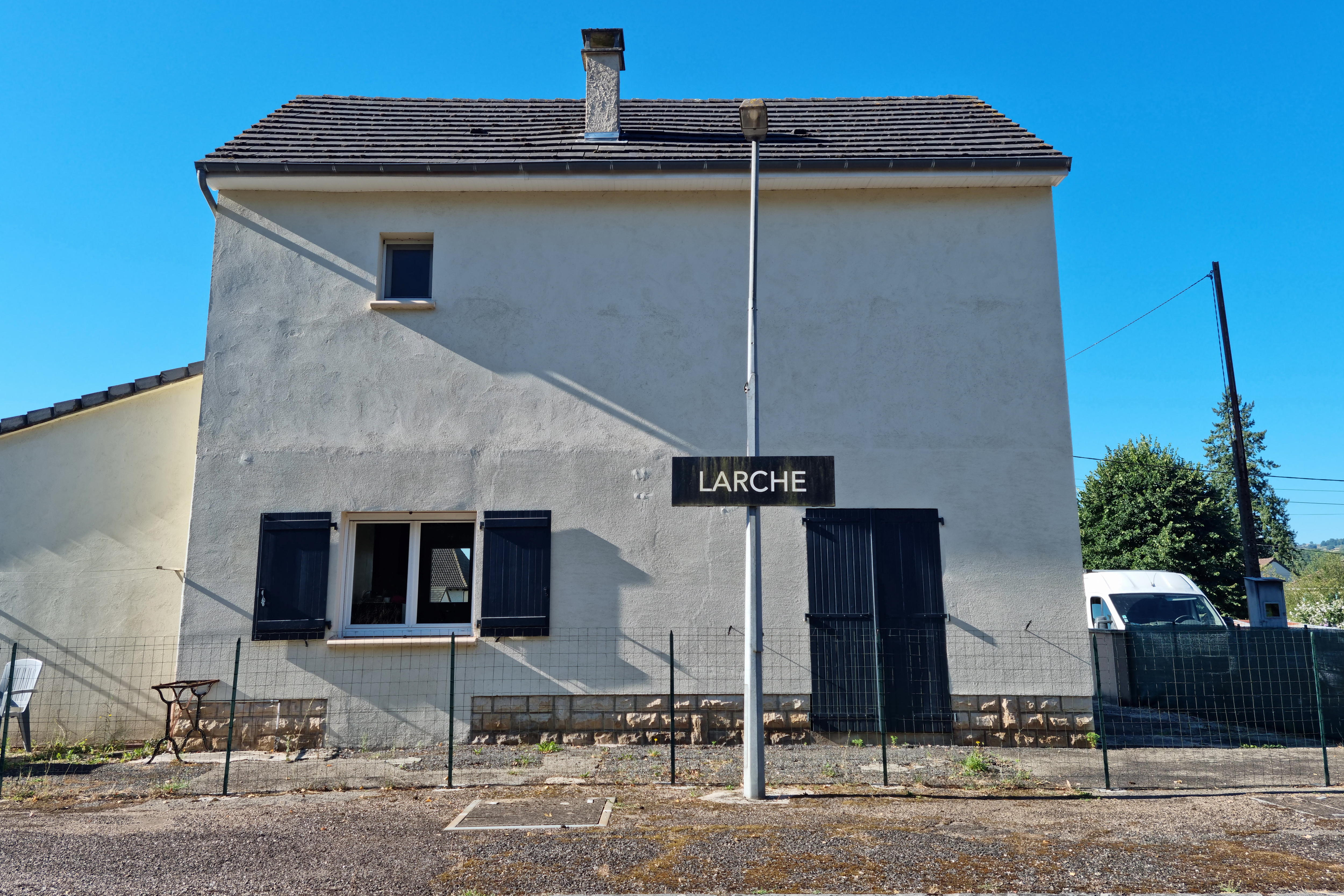

Larche is a former railway station in Larche, Nouvelle-Aquitaine, France. The station is located on the Coutras - Tulle railway line. Train services were suspended in 2020.
