= Beauronne =

Beauronne may refer to:

- Beauronne, Dordogne, a commune in southwestern France
- three small rivers in southwestern France, all tributaries of the river Isle:
  - Beauronne (Chancelade), flowing through Chancelade
  - Beauronne (Les Lèches), flowing through Les Lèches
  - Beauronne (Saint-Vincent-de-Connezac), flowing through Saint-Vincent-de-Connezac
