= Haute Loue =

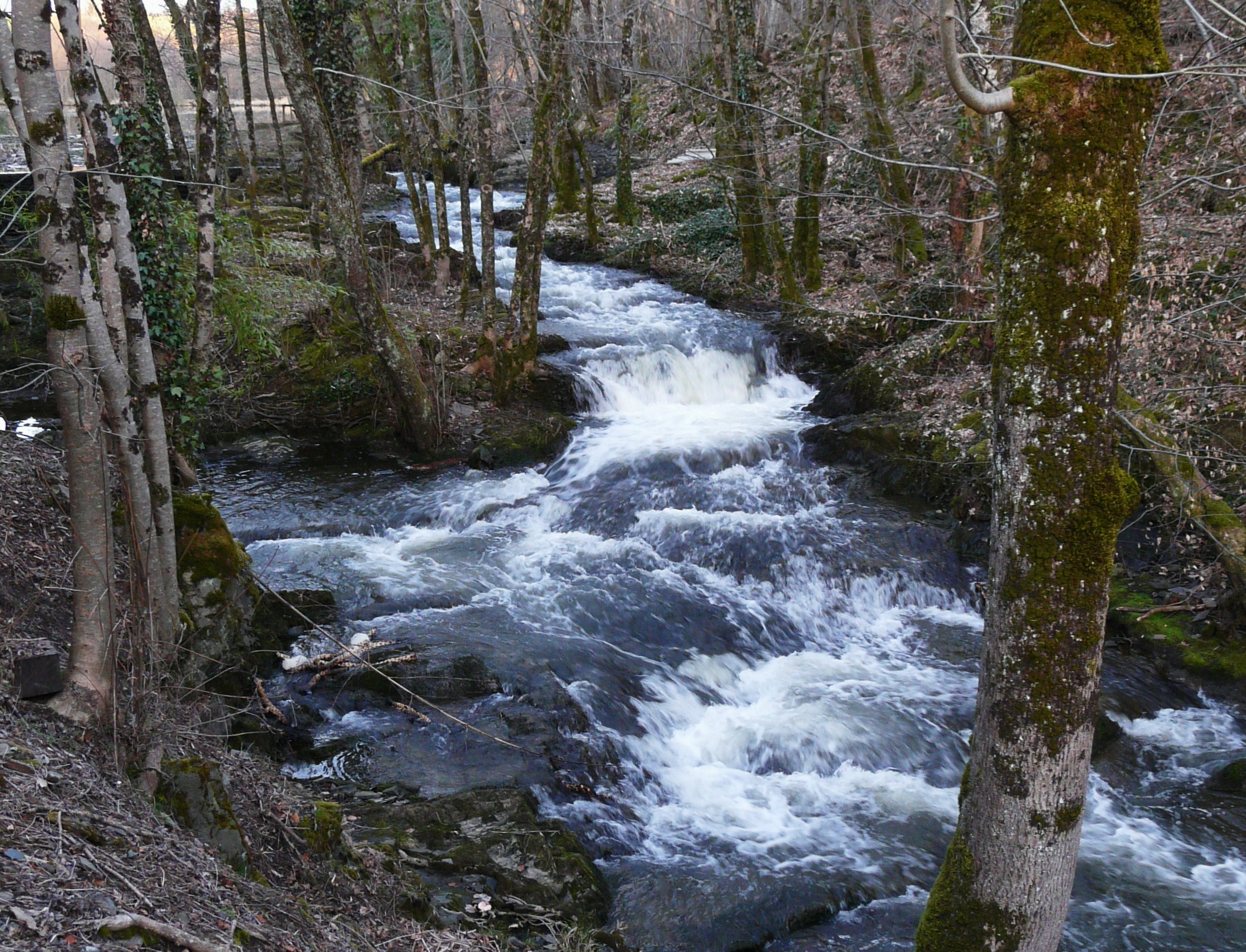

- Location within France Location within Nouvelle-Aquitaine

Location
- Country: France

Physical characteristics
- Source
  - location: Dordogne
- Mouth
  - location: Loue
  - coordinates: 45°22′5″N 1°5′24″E
- Length: 18.6 km (11.6 mi)

Basin features
- Progression: Loue→ Isle→ Dordogne→ Gironde estuary→ Atlantic Ocean

Haute Loue (French meaning the Upper Loue) is a river in the Dordogne department of France. It is a tributary of the Loue, which is itself a tributary of the Isle. It is 18.6 km (11.6 mi) long.

The source of the river is in the commune of Angoisse. It empties into the Loue southwest of Lanouaille.
