= Ravillou =

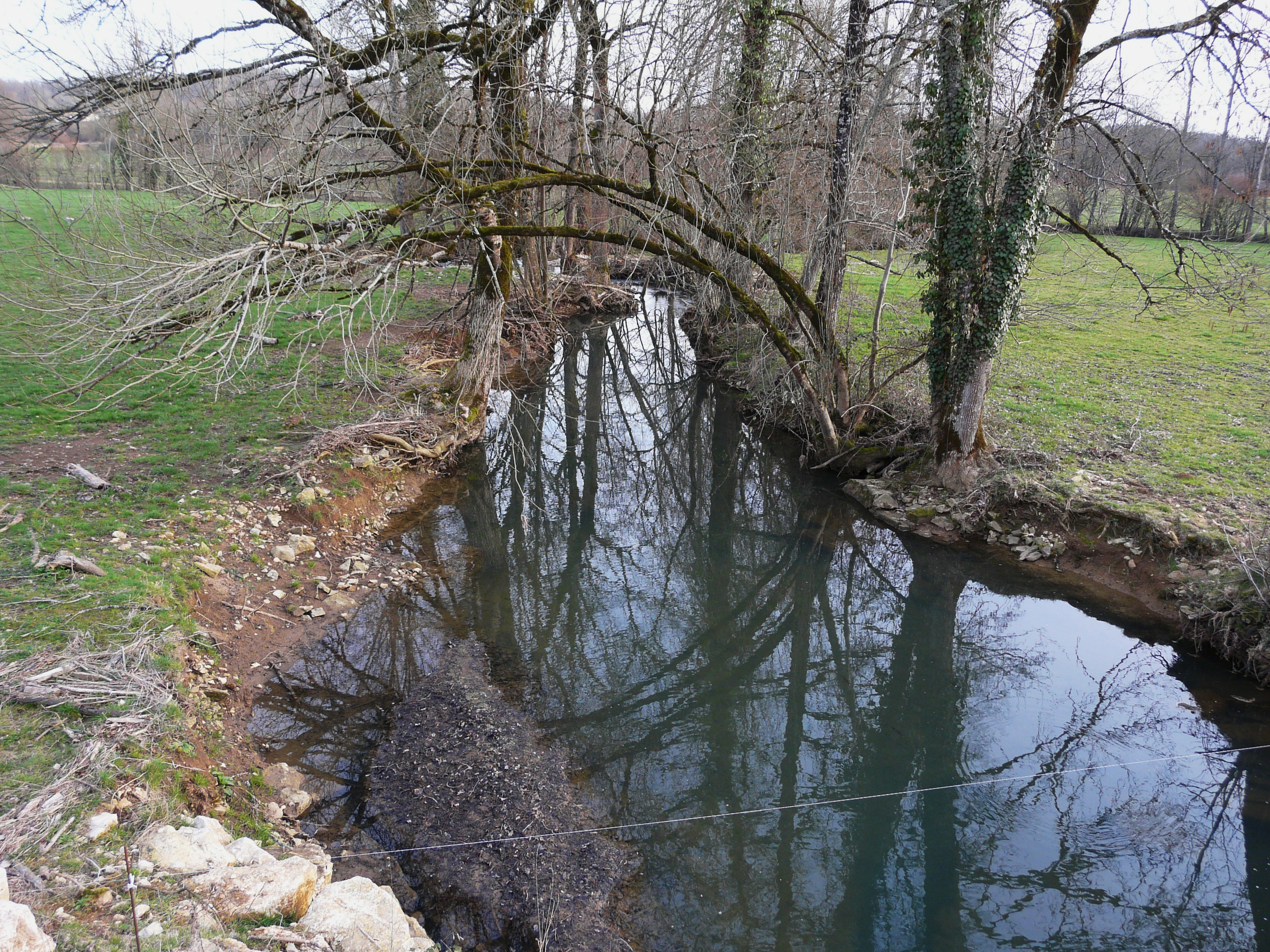
- The Ravillou near Saint-Pantaly-d'Excideuil

- Location within France Location within Nouvelle-Aquitaine

Location
- Country: France

Physical characteristics
- Source
  - location: Dordogne
- Mouth
  - location: Loue
  - coordinates: 45°18′47″N 0°59′18″E
- Length: 13 km (8.1 mi)

Basin features
- Progression: Loue→ Isle→ Dordogne→ Gironde estuary→ Atlantic Ocean

The Ravillou is a 13 km long river in the Dordogne department, France. It is a right tributary of the Loue, part of the Dordogne basin. The river rises in the commune of Dussac and runs through Saint-Germain-des-Prés before emptying into the Loue northwest of Coulaures.

On the night of June 13 and 14, 2007, a flash flood caused by a storm turned the Ravillou and its tributary the Merdanson into devastating torrents, that damaged the town of Saint-Germain-des-Prés and the bridge across the Ravillou.
