= Saint-Michel-de-Double =

- Commune
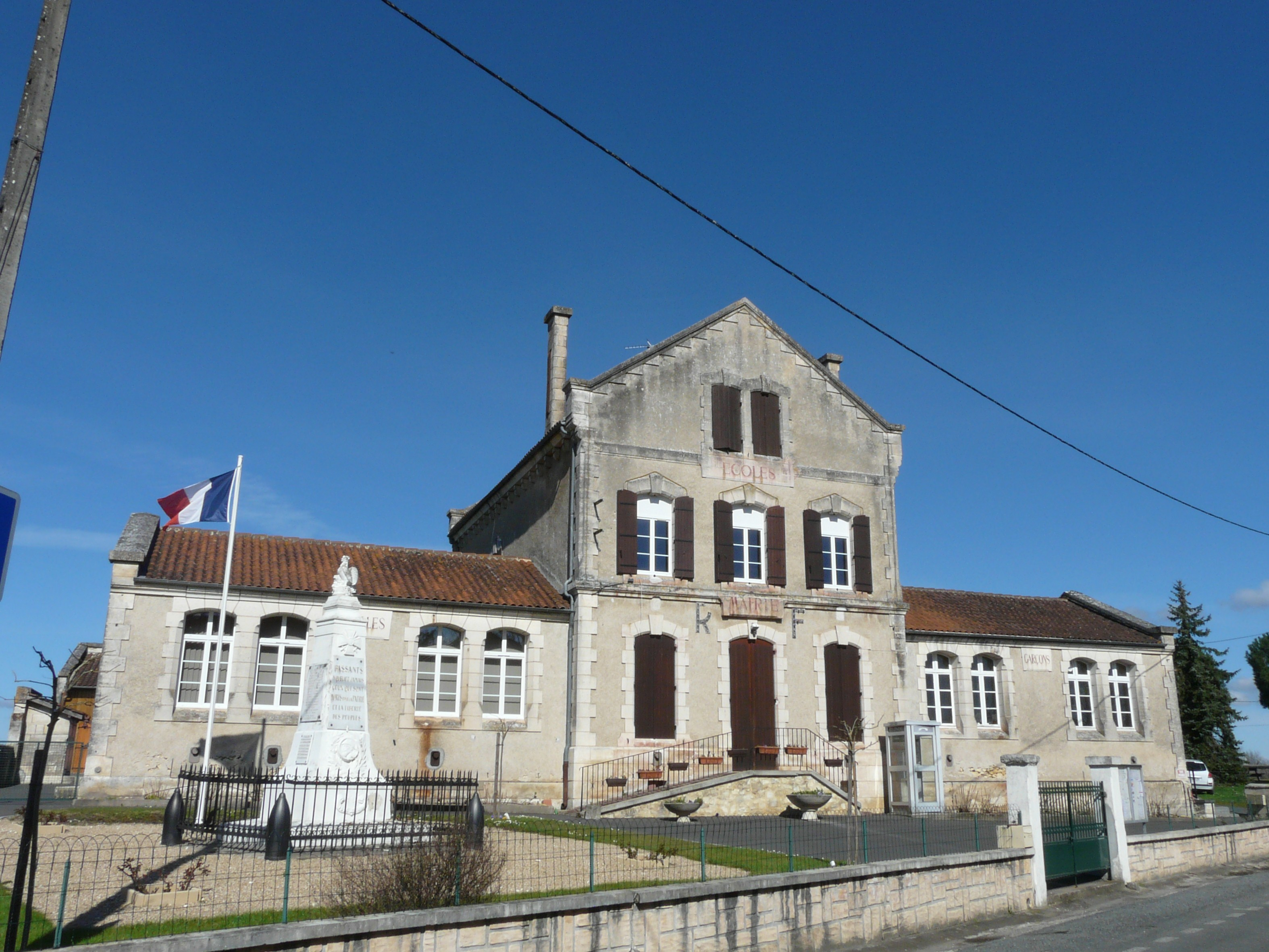
- The town hall in Saint-Michel-de-Double
- Location of Saint-Michel-de-Double
- Location within France Location within Nouvelle-Aquitaine
- Coordinates: 45°04′50″N 0°17′24″E
- Country: France
- Region: Nouvelle-Aquitaine
- Department: Dordogne
- Arrondissement: Périgueux
- Canton: Vallée de l'Isle

Government
  - Mayor (2020–2026): Serge Durant
- Area^{1}: 29.48 km^{2} (11.38 sq mi)
- Elevation: 105 m (344 ft)
- Highest elevation: 126 m (413 ft)
- Lowest elevation: 47 m (154 ft)
- Population (2023): 232
  - Density: 7.87/km^{2} (20.4/sq mi)
- Time zone: UTC+01:00 (CET)
  - Summer (DST): UTC+02:00 (CEST)
- INSEE/Postal code: 24465 /24400
- ^{1} French Land Register data, which excludes lakes, ponds, glaciers > 1 km^{2} (0.386 sq mi or 247 acres) and river estuaries.

Saint-Michel-de-Double (French pronunciation: [sɛ̃ miʃɛl də dubl]; Occitan: Sent Micheu de Dobla) is a commune in the Dordogne department in Nouvelle-Aquitaine in southwestern France.

== Population ==
Historical population
Year	Pop.	±% p.a.
1968	338	—
1975	263	−3.52%
1982	260	−0.16%
1990	285	+1.15%
1999	272	−0.52%
2007	275	+0.14%
2012	259	−1.19%
2017	240	−1.51%
2023	232	−0.56%
Source: INSEE

== See also ==
- Communes of the Dordogne department
