= Beaupouyet =

- Commune
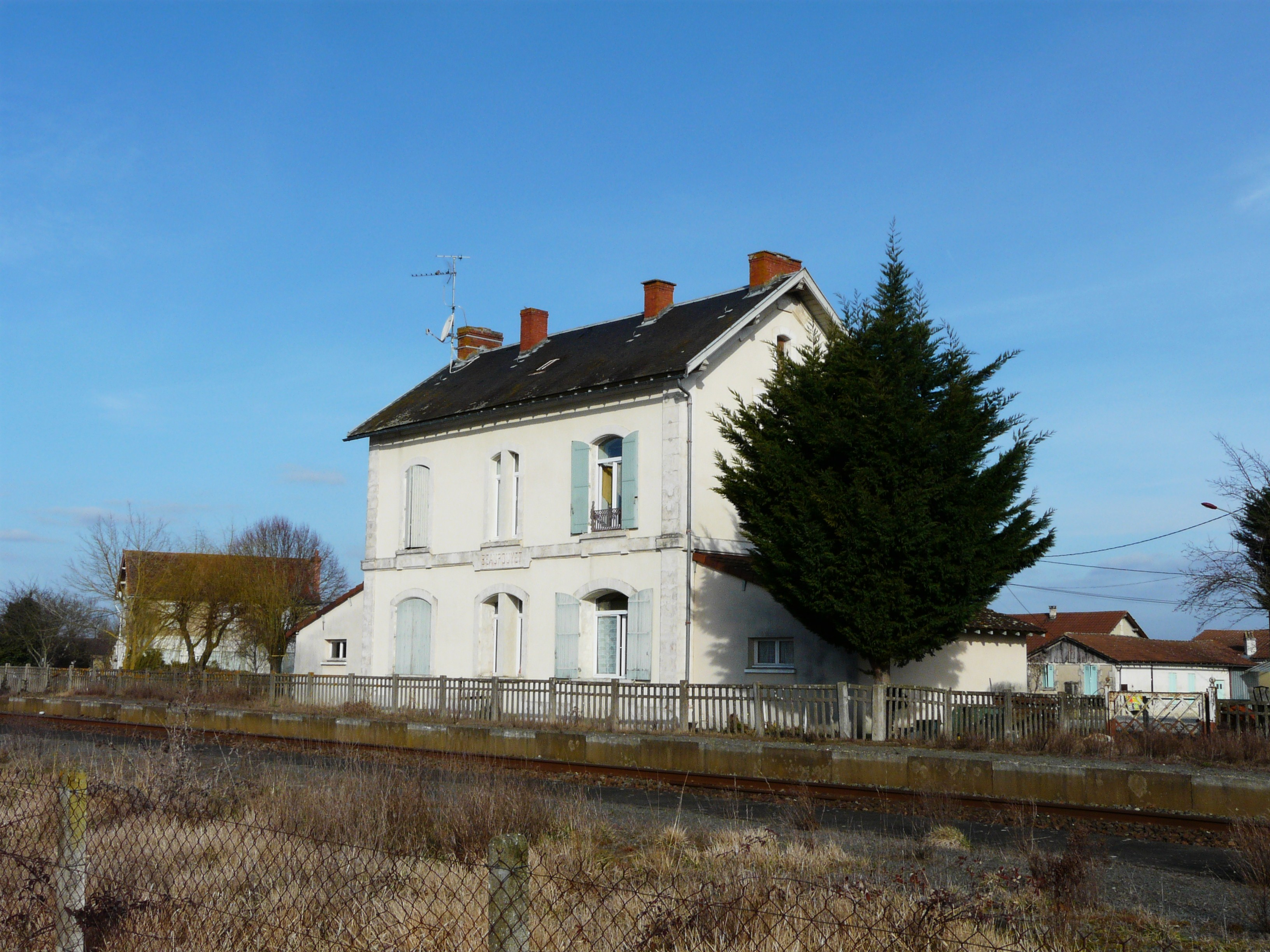
- Former railway station

- Coat of arms
- Location of Beaupouyet
- Location within France Location within Nouvelle-Aquitaine
- Coordinates: 44°59′51″N 0°16′25″E
- Country: France
- Region: Nouvelle-Aquitaine
- Department: Dordogne
- Arrondissement: Périgueux
- Canton: Vallée de l'Isle

Government
  - Mayor (2020–2026): Jean-Luc Gross
- Area^{1}: 22.63 km^{2} (8.74 sq mi)
- Elevation: 80 m (260 ft)
- Highest elevation: 139 m (456 ft)
- Lowest elevation: 38 m (125 ft)
- Population (2023): 553
  - Density: 24.4/km^{2} (63.3/sq mi)
- Time zone: UTC+01:00 (CET)
  - Summer (DST): UTC+02:00 (CEST)
- INSEE/Postal code: 24029 /24400
- ^{1} French Land Register data, which excludes lakes, ponds, glaciers > 1 km^{2} (0.386 sq mi or 247 acres) and river estuaries.

Beaupouyet (French pronunciation: [bopuje]) is a commune in the Dordogne department in southwestern France.

== Population ==
Historical population
Year	Pop.	±% p.a.
1968	510	—
1975	532	+0.61%
1982	512	−0.55%
1990	439	−1.90%
1999	465	+0.64%
2007	455	−0.27%
2012	492	+1.58%
2017	492	+0.00%
2023	553	+1.97%
Source: INSEE

== See also ==
- Communes of the Dordogne department
