= Bourgnac =

- Commune
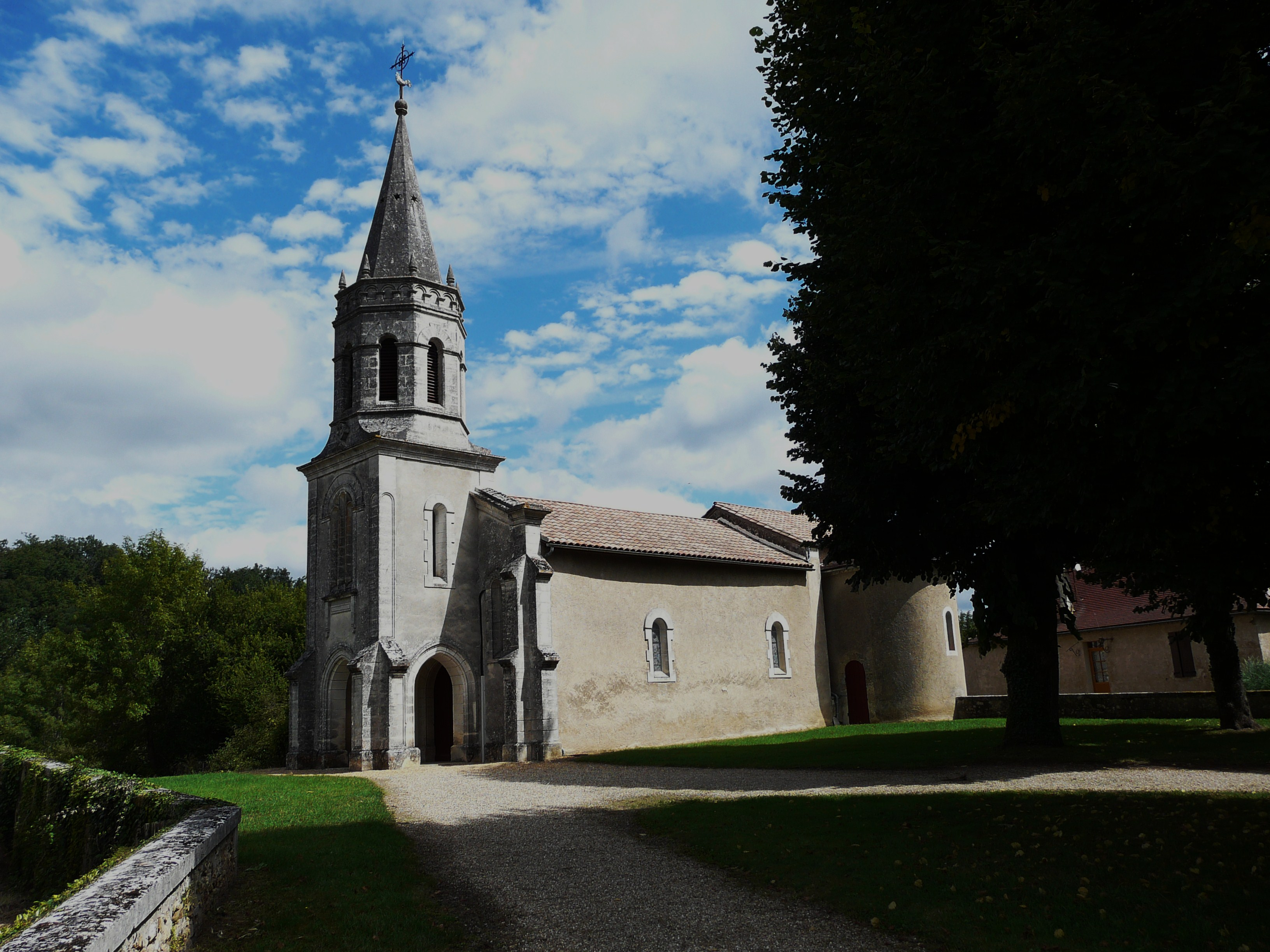
- The church in Bourgnac
- Location of Bourgnac
- Location within France Location within Nouvelle-Aquitaine
- Coordinates: 45°01′05″N 0°24′12″E
- Country: France
- Region: Nouvelle-Aquitaine
- Department: Dordogne
- Arrondissement: Périgueux
- Canton: Vallée de l'Isle

Government
  - Mayor (2020–2026): Robert Aymard
- Area^{1}: 9.06 km^{2} (3.50 sq mi)
- Elevation: 71 m (233 ft)
- Highest elevation: 158 m (518 ft)
- Lowest elevation: 49 m (161 ft)
- Population (2023): 354
  - Density: 39.1/km^{2} (101/sq mi)
- Time zone: UTC+01:00 (CET)
  - Summer (DST): UTC+02:00 (CEST)
- INSEE/Postal code: 24059 /24400
- ^{1} French Land Register data, which excludes lakes, ponds, glaciers > 1 km^{2} (0.386 sq mi or 247 acres) and river estuaries.

Bourgnac (French pronunciation: [buʁɲak]; Occitan: Bornhac) is a commune in the Dordogne department in southwestern France.

== Population ==
Historical population
Year	Pop.	±% p.a.
1968	309	—
1975	263	−2.28%
1982	250	−0.72%
1990	287	+1.74%
1999	295	+0.31%
2007	298	+0.13%
2012	332	+2.18%
2017	343	+0.65%
2023	354	+0.53%
Source: INSEE

== See also ==
- Communes of the Dordogne département
