= Saint-Laurent-des-Hommes =

- Commune
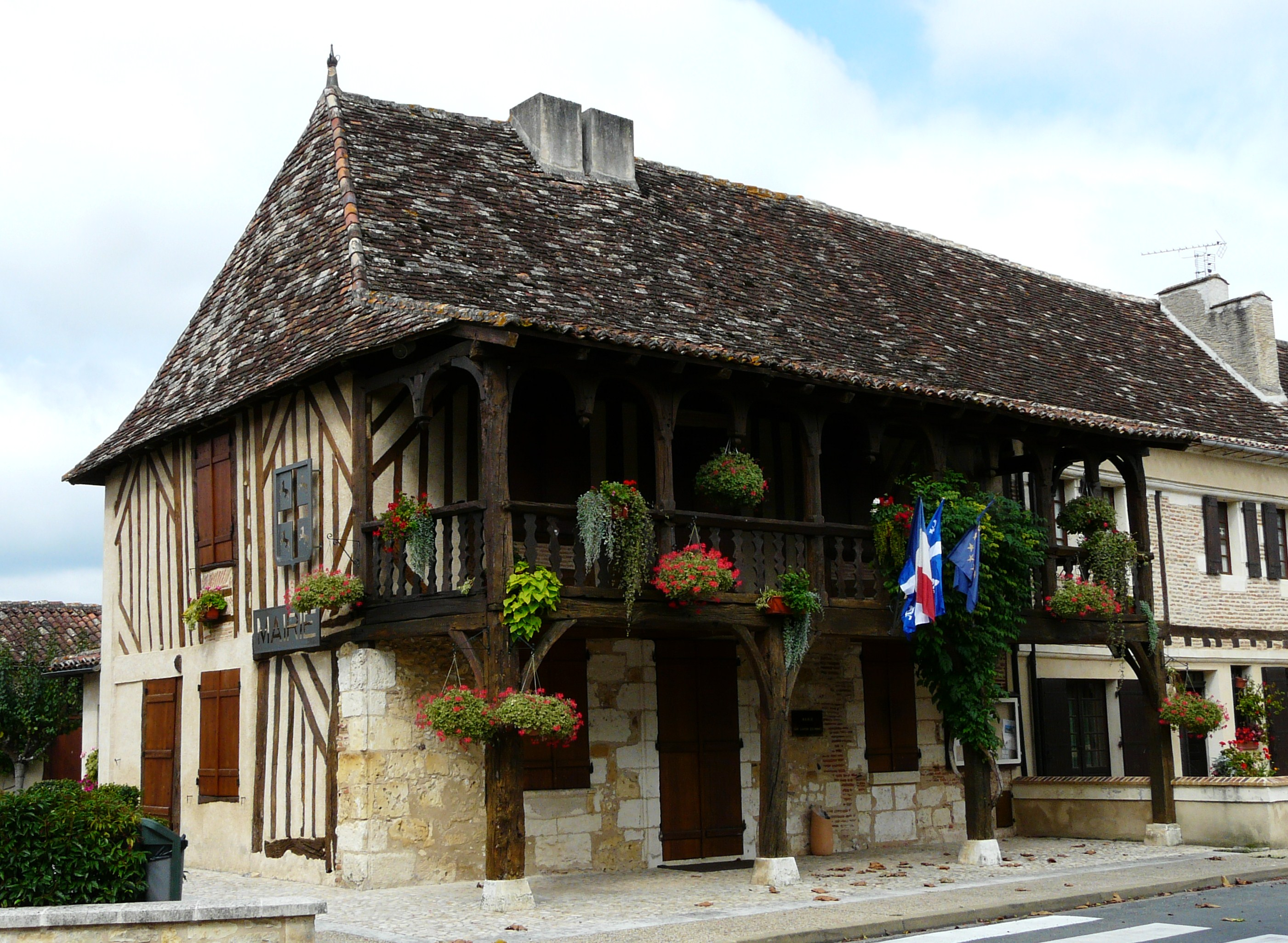
- Town hall

- Coat of arms
- Location of Saint-Laurent-des-Hommes
- Location within France Location within Nouvelle-Aquitaine
- Coordinates: 45°02′19″N 0°15′15″E
- Country: France
- Region: Nouvelle-Aquitaine
- Department: Dordogne
- Arrondissement: Périgueux
- Canton: Vallée de l'Isle

Government
  - Mayor (2020–2026): Michel Donnette
- Area^{1}: 31.94 km^{2} (12.33 sq mi)
- Elevation: 40 m (130 ft)
- Highest elevation: 113 m (371 ft)
- Lowest elevation: 31 m (102 ft)
- Population (2023): 1,012
  - Density: 31.68/km^{2} (82.06/sq mi)
- Time zone: UTC+01:00 (CET)
  - Summer (DST): UTC+02:00 (CEST)
- INSEE/Postal code: 24436 /24400
- ^{1} French Land Register data, which excludes lakes, ponds, glaciers > 1 km^{2} (0.386 sq mi or 247 acres) and river estuaries.

Saint-Laurent-des-Hommes (French pronunciation: [sɛ̃ loʁɑ̃ de.z‿ɔm]; Occitan: Sent Laurenç daus Urmes) is a commune in the Dordogne department in Nouvelle-Aquitaine in southwestern France.

== Population ==
Historical population
Year	Pop.	±% p.a.
1968	861	—
1975	867	+0.10%
1982	863	−0.07%
1990	938	+1.05%
1999	884	−0.66%
2007	1,004	+1.60%
2012	1,048	+0.86%
2017	1,018	−0.58%
2023	1,012	−0.10%
Source: INSEE

== See also ==
- Communes of the Dordogne department
