= Saint-Front-de-Pradoux =

- Commune
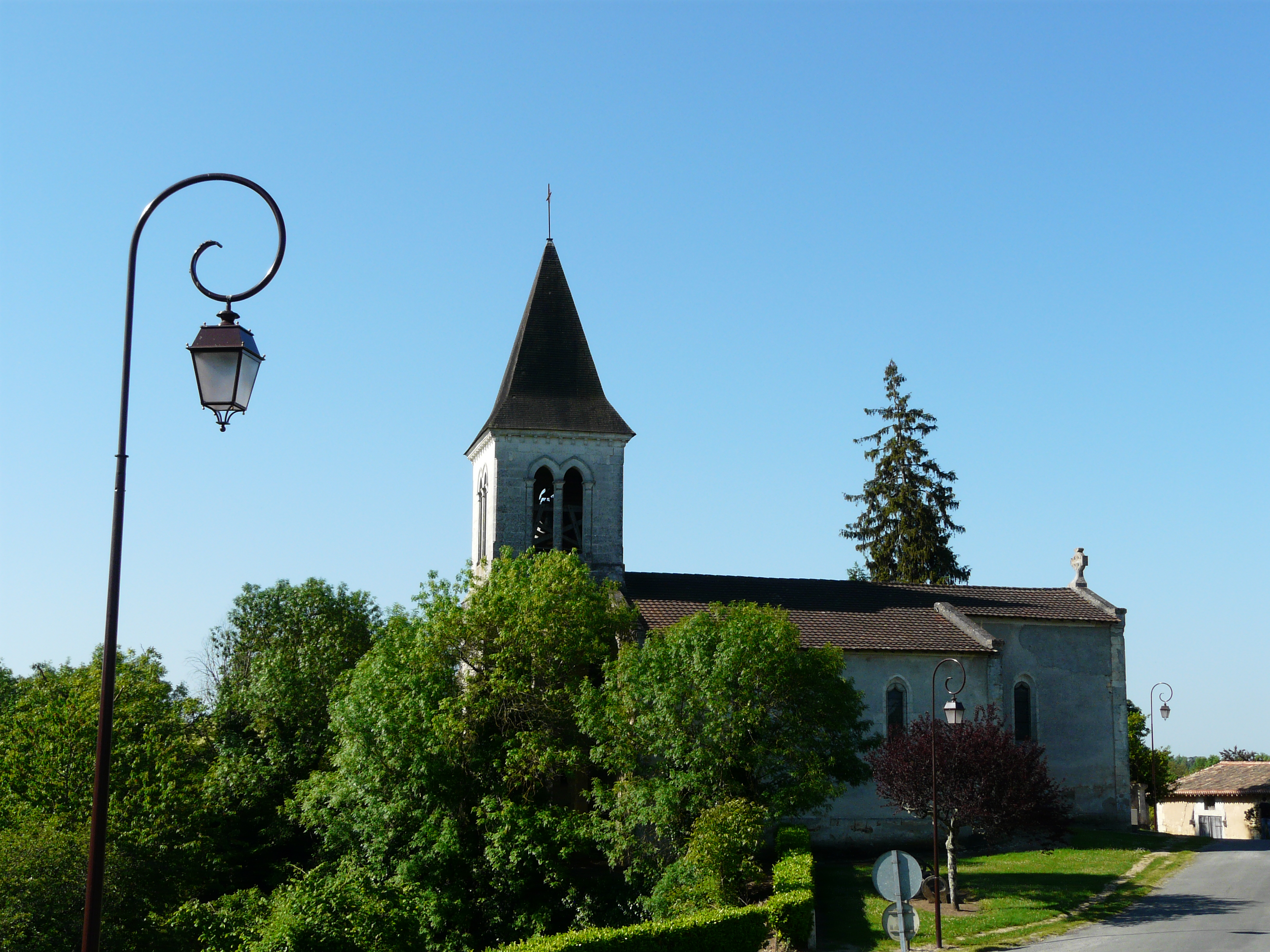
- The church in Saint-Front-de-Pradoux

- Coat of arms
- Location of Saint-Front-de-Pradoux
- Location within France Location within Nouvelle-Aquitaine
- Coordinates: 45°03′21″N 0°21′55″E
- Country: France
- Region: Nouvelle-Aquitaine
- Department: Dordogne
- Arrondissement: Périgueux
- Canton: Vallée de l'Isle

Government
  - Mayor (2020–2026): Pierre-André Crouzille
- Area^{1}: 9.01 km^{2} (3.48 sq mi)
- Elevation: 50 m (160 ft)
- Highest elevation: 157 m (515 ft)
- Lowest elevation: 41 m (135 ft)
- Population (2023): 1,148
  - Density: 127/km^{2} (330/sq mi)
- Time zone: UTC+01:00 (CET)
  - Summer (DST): UTC+02:00 (CEST)
- INSEE/Postal code: 24409 /24400
- ^{1} French Land Register data, which excludes lakes, ponds, glaciers > 1 km^{2} (0.386 sq mi or 247 acres) and river estuaries.

Saint-Front-de-Pradoux (French pronunciation: [sɛ̃ fʁɔ̃ də pʁadu]; Occitan: Sent Front de Pradon) is a commune in the Dordogne department in Nouvelle-Aquitaine in southwestern France.

== Population ==
Historical population
Year	Pop.	±% p.a.
1968	785	—
1975	910	+2.13%
1982	981	+1.08%
1990	1,000	+0.24%
1999	929	−0.81%
2007	1,068	+1.76%
2012	1,148	+1.46%
2017	1,160	+0.21%
2023	1,148	−0.17%
Source: INSEE

== See also ==
- Communes of the Dordogne department
