= Saint-Médard-de-Mussidan =

- Commune
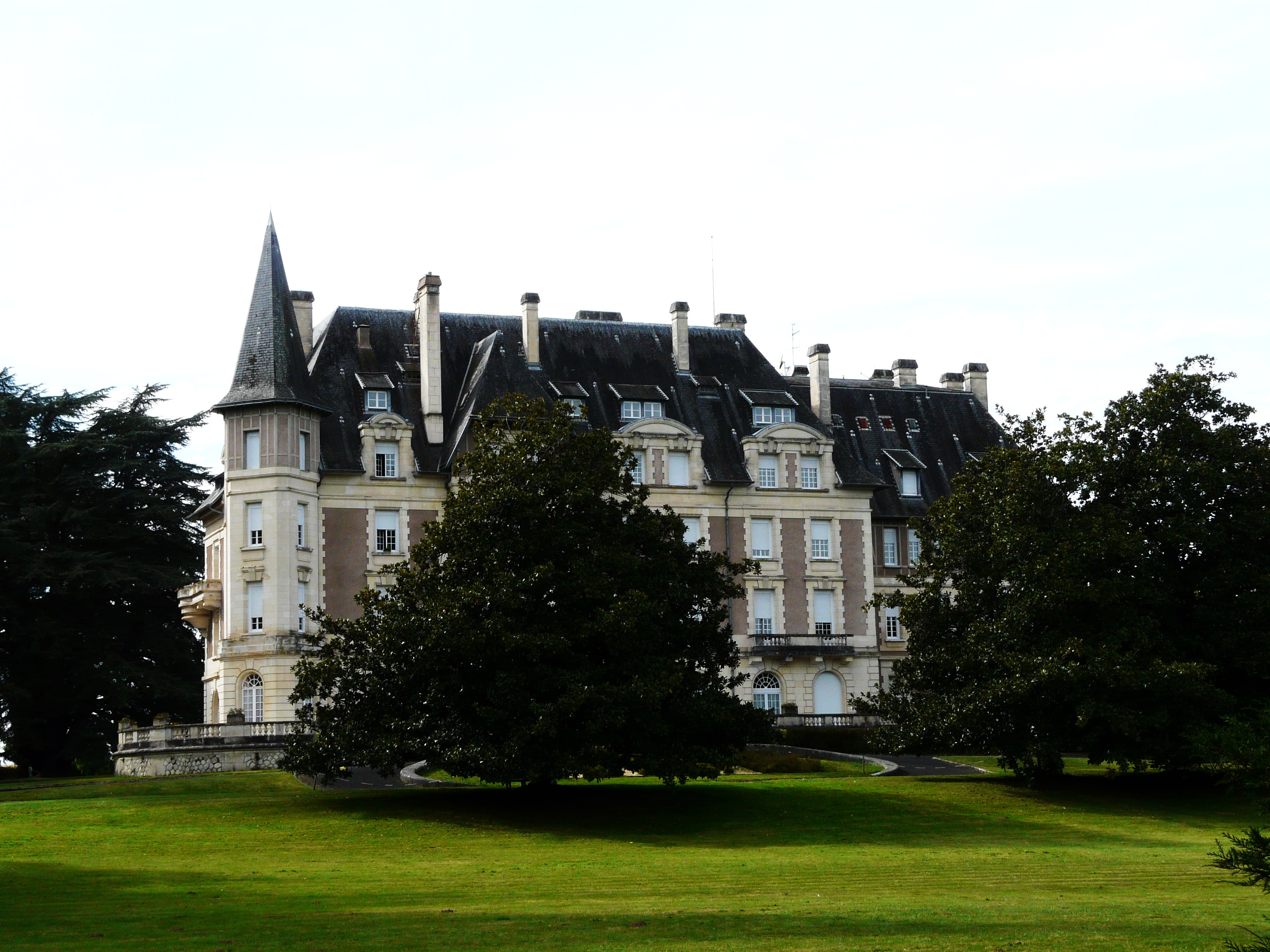
- The chateau of Bassy in Saint-Médard-de-Mussidan
- Location of Saint-Médard-de-Mussidan
- Location within France Location within Nouvelle-Aquitaine
- Coordinates: 45°02′42″N 0°20′52″E
- Country: France
- Region: Nouvelle-Aquitaine
- Department: Dordogne
- Arrondissement: Périgueux
- Canton: Vallée de l'Isle

Government
  - Mayor (2020–2026): Michel Florenty
- Area^{1}: 24.45 km^{2} (9.44 sq mi)
- Elevation: 56 m (184 ft)
- Highest elevation: 150 m (490 ft)
- Lowest elevation: 37 m (121 ft)
- Population (2023): 1,618
  - Density: 66.18/km^{2} (171.4/sq mi)
- Time zone: UTC+01:00 (CET)
  - Summer (DST): UTC+02:00 (CEST)
- INSEE/Postal code: 24462 /24400
- ^{1} French Land Register data, which excludes lakes, ponds, glaciers > 1 km^{2} (0.386 sq mi or 247 acres) and river estuaries.

Saint-Médard-de-Mussidan (French pronunciation: [sɛ̃ medaʁ də mysidɑ̃], literally Saint Médard of Mussidan; Limousin: Sent Meard de Moissídan or Sent Mierd de Moissídan) is a commune in the Dordogne department in Nouvelle-Aquitaine in southwestern France.

== Population ==
Historical population
Year	Pop.	±% p.a.
1968	1,327	—
1975	1,540	+2.15%
1982	1,644	+0.94%
1990	1,600	−0.34%
1999	1,512	−0.63%
2007	1,643	+1.04%
2012	1,711	+0.81%
2017	1,713	+0.02%
2023	1,618	−0.95%
Source: INSEE

== See also ==
- Communes of the Dordogne department
