= Beauronne (Les Lèches) =

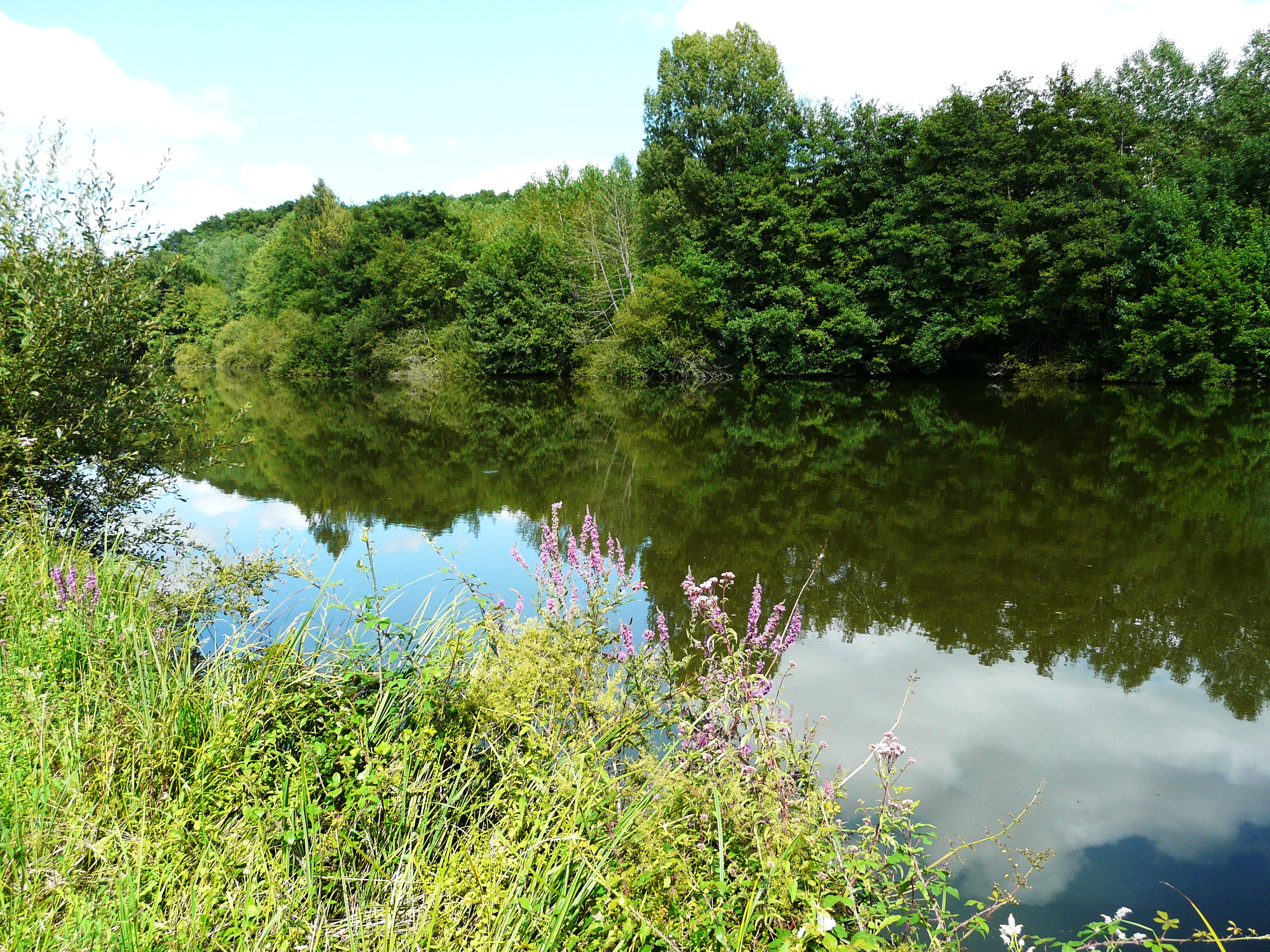

- Location within France Location within Nouvelle-Aquitaine

Location
- Country: France

Physical characteristics
- Source
  - location: Dordogne department
- Mouth
  - location: Isle
  - coordinates: 45°3′24″N 0°22′47″E
- Length: 15 km (9.3 mi)

Basin features
- Progression: Isle→ Dordogne→ Gironde estuary→ Atlantic Ocean

The Beauronne (French pronunciation: [boʁɔn]) is a 15 km long stream in the Dordogne department, France. It is a tributary of the river Isle, which in turn is a tributary of the Dordogne.

The name of the Beauronne has a Celtic origin, and comes from bebros ("beaver") and ona ("river").

== Geography ==
The river's source is in the commune of Église-Neuve-d'Issac, it runs through Les Lèches and empties into the Isle west of Mussidan.

== Ecology and Fishing ==
According to the Dordogne Fishing Federation, the Beauronne des Lèches is classified as a first-category fishing waterway. The main fish species found in the river include trout, minnows, and chubs. Recommended fishing techniques include natural bait fishing and casting, though maggots and diptera larvae (particularly bloodworms) are prohibited in this first-category waterway.
