= Saint-Martin-l'Astier =

- Commune
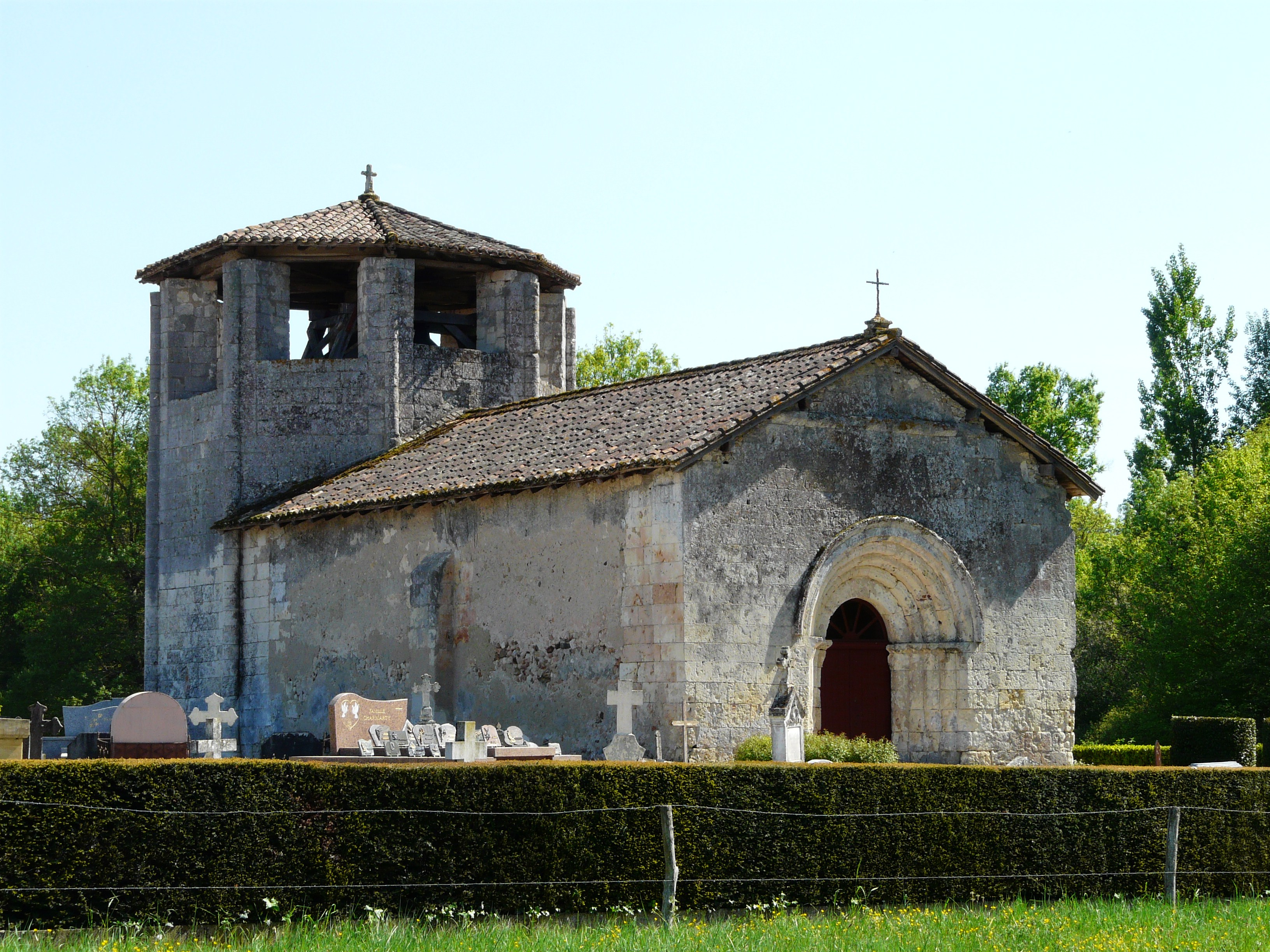
- The church in Saint-Martin-l'Astier

- Coat of arms
- Location of Saint-Martin-l'Astier
- Location within France Location within Nouvelle-Aquitaine
- Coordinates: 45°03′25″N 0°19′48″E
- Country: France
- Region: Nouvelle-Aquitaine
- Department: Dordogne
- Arrondissement: Périgueux
- Canton: Vallée de l'Isle

Government
  - Mayor (2020–2026): Jean-Luc Tomski
- Area^{1}: 9.40 km^{2} (3.63 sq mi)
- Elevation: 45 m (148 ft)
- Highest elevation: 147 m (482 ft)
- Lowest elevation: 39 m (128 ft)
- Population (2023): 142
  - Density: 15.1/km^{2} (39.1/sq mi)
- Time zone: UTC+01:00 (CET)
  - Summer (DST): UTC+02:00 (CEST)
- INSEE/Postal code: 24457 /24400
- ^{1} French Land Register data, which excludes lakes, ponds, glaciers > 1 km^{2} (0.386 sq mi or 247 acres) and river estuaries.

Saint-Martin-l'Astier (French pronunciation: [sɛ̃ maʁtɛ̃ lastje]; Limousin: Sent Martin l'Astier) is a commune in the Dordogne department in Nouvelle-Aquitaine in southwestern France.

== Population ==
Historical population
Year	Pop.	±% p.a.
1968	128	—
1975	120	−0.92%
1982	140	+2.23%
1990	152	+1.03%
1999	137	−1.15%
2007	133	−0.37%
2012	137	+0.59%
2017	138	+0.15%
2023	142	+0.48%
Source: INSEE

== See also ==
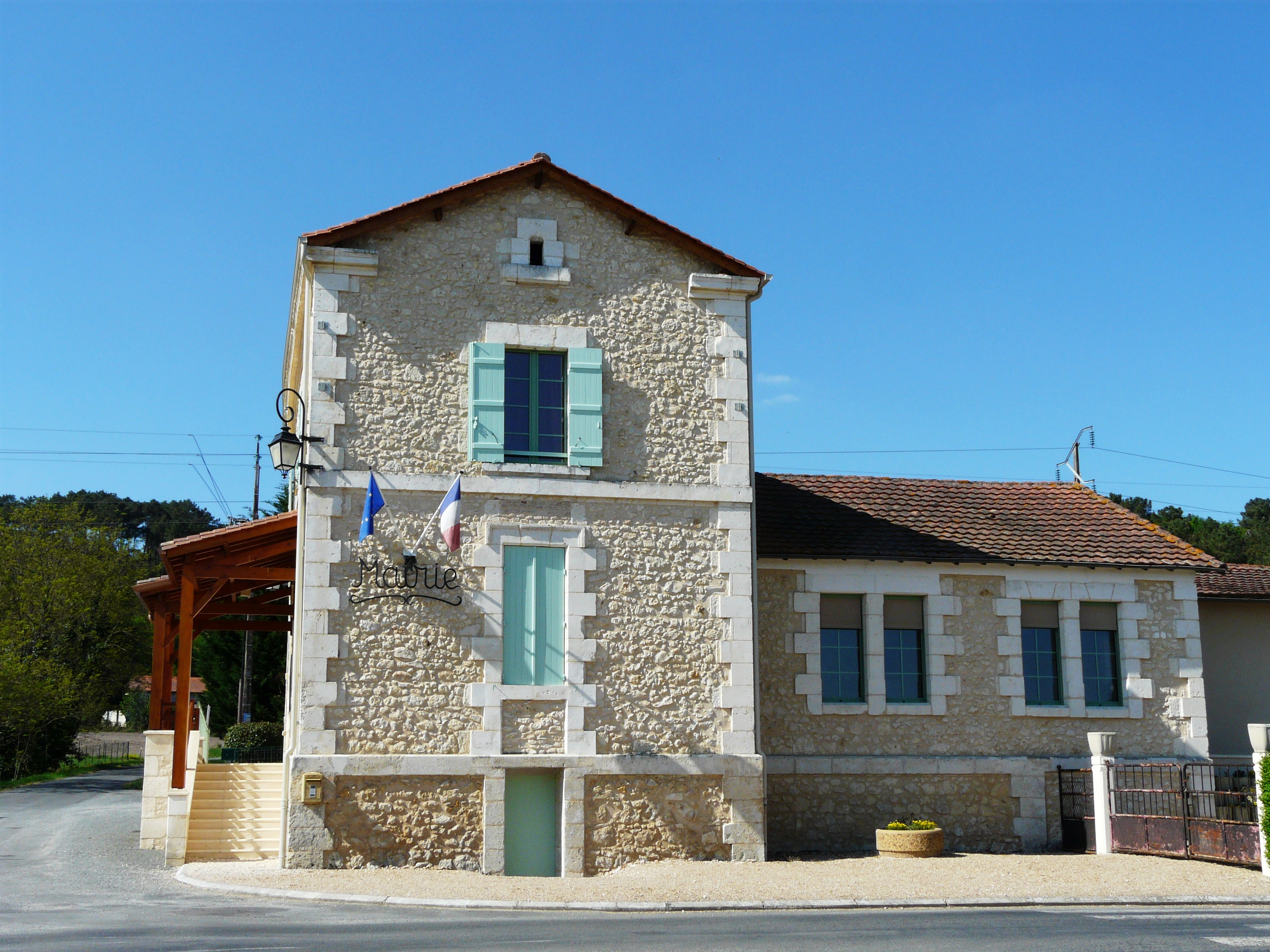
Saint-Martin-l'Astier town hall

- Communes of the Dordogne department
