= Canton of Vallée de l'Isle =

Coordinates: 45.10°N 0.47°E

The canton of Vallée de l'Isle is an administrative division of the Dordogne department, southwestern France. It was created at the French canton reorganisation which came into effect in March 2015. Its seat is in Neuvic.

It consists of the following communes:

1. Beaupouyet
2. Beauronne
3. Bourgnac
4. Chantérac
5. Douzillac
6. Les Lèches
7. Mussidan
8. Neuvic
9. Saint-Aquilin
10. Saint-Étienne-de-Puycorbier
11. Saint-Front-de-Pradoux
12. Saint-Germain-du-Salembre
13. Saint-Jean-d'Ataux
14. Saint-Laurent-des-Hommes
15. Saint-Louis-en-l'Isle
16. Saint-Martin-l'Astier
17. Saint-Médard-de-Mussidan
18. Saint-Michel-de-Double
19. Saint-Séverin-d'Estissac
20. Sourzac
21. Vallereuil
