= Vallereuil =

- Commune
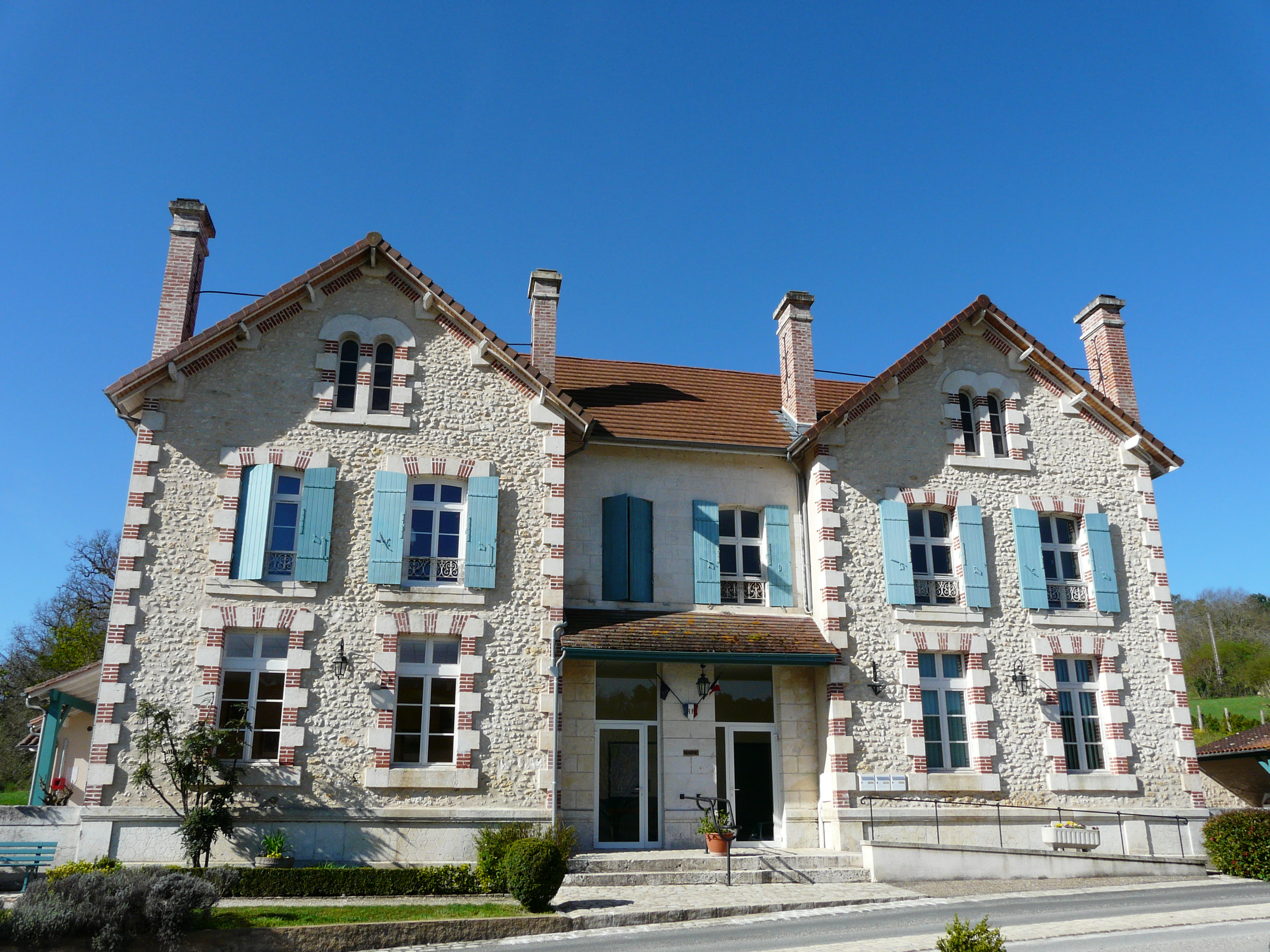
- Town hall
- Location of Vallereuil
- Location within France Location within Nouvelle-Aquitaine
- Coordinates: 45°04′24″N 0°30′08″E
- Country: France
- Region: Nouvelle-Aquitaine
- Department: Dordogne
- Arrondissement: Périgueux
- Canton: Vallée de l'Isle

Government
  - Mayor (2020–2026): Christine Guthinger
- Area^{1}: 9.27 km^{2} (3.58 sq mi)
- Highest elevation: 206 m (676 ft)
- Lowest elevation: 62 m (203 ft)
- Population (2023): 260
  - Density: 28/km^{2} (73/sq mi)
- Time zone: UTC+01:00 (CET)
  - Summer (DST): UTC+02:00 (CEST)
- INSEE/Postal code: 24562 /24190
- ^{1} French Land Register data, which excludes lakes, ponds, glaciers > 1 km^{2} (0.386 sq mi or 247 acres) and river estuaries.

Vallereuil (French pronunciation: [valʁœj]; Occitan: Valaruelh) is a commune in the Dordogne department in Nouvelle-Aquitaine in southwestern France.

== Population ==
Historical population
Year	Pop.	±% p.a.
1968	248	—
1975	258	+0.57%
1982	252	−0.34%
1990	232	−1.03%
1999	273	+1.82%
2007	276	+0.14%
2012	281	+0.36%
2017	288	+0.49%
2023	260	−1.69%
Source: INSEE

== See also ==
- Communes of the Dordogne department
