= Vigy =

- Commune
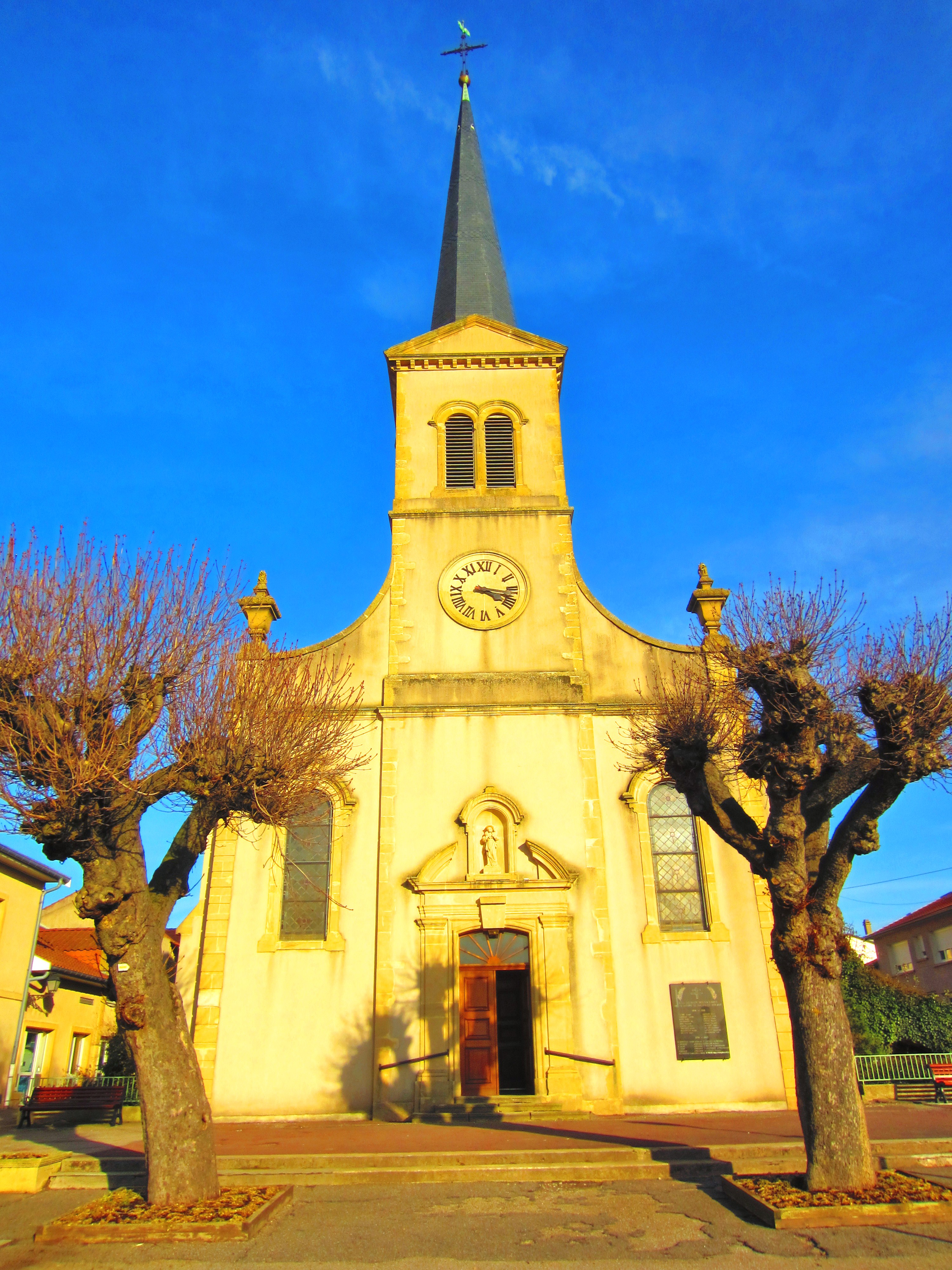
- The church in Vigy

- Coat of arms
- Location of Vigy
- Location within France Location within Grand Est
- Coordinates: 49°12′16″N 6°17′54″E
- Country: France
- Region: Grand Est
- Department: Moselle
- Arrondissement: Metz
- Canton: Le Pays Messin
- Intercommunality: Haut Chemin - Pays de Pange

Government
  - Mayor (2020–2026): Sylvain Weil
- Area^{1}: 17.07 km^{2} (6.59 sq mi)
- Population (2023): 1,522
  - Density: 89.16/km^{2} (230.9/sq mi)
- Time zone: UTC+01:00 (CET)
  - Summer (DST): UTC+02:00 (CEST)
- INSEE/Postal code: 57716 /57640
- Website: www.mairie-vigy.fr
- ^{1} French Land Register data, which excludes lakes, ponds, glaciers > 1 km^{2} (0.386 sq mi or 247 acres) and river estuaries.

Vigy (French pronunciation: [viʒi]; German: Wigingen) is a commune in the Moselle department in Grand Est in north-eastern France.

== Geography ==
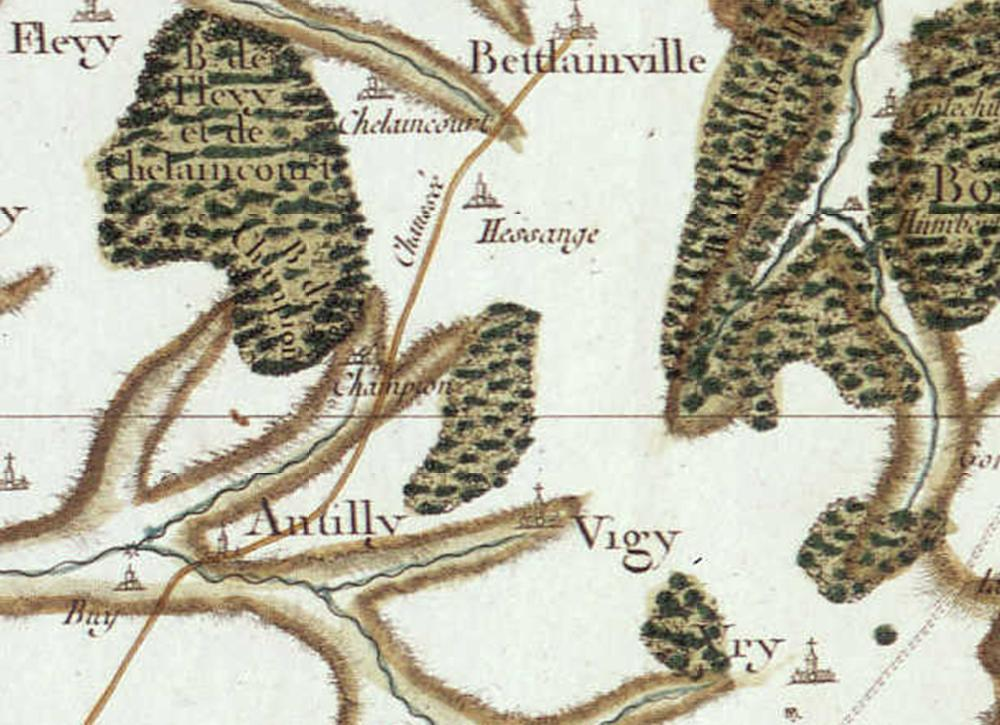
1760

Situated 15 km (9.3 mi) from Metz, Vigy lies on the border of Germany and Luxembourg. The village of Vigy is located in a sector recognized for its landscape qualities. Vigy enjoys a privileged location on the edge of a forest.

Part of village belongs to an Important Bird Area

== Etymology ==
The name of the village may come from a man of Gallo-Roman origin, Vigius.

== History ==
Founded as a city by the Romans or Gallo-Romans, Vigy was given to the Abbey of Saint-Arnould on 23 June 715. In 1365, the people of Vigy were placed under the protection of Luxembourg. On 12 September 1635 almost the entirety of the village was burned by the Spanish. It was reattached to France in 1648.

Vigy has been the seat of a canton since the French Revolution.

During World War I, the residents of Vigy were resettled in Mussidan in the Dordogne.

== Economy ==
Initially, the village grew on agriculture.

The early prosperity of the village was largely due to the nearby iron and steel industries. Many of these industries have since disappeared. Nowadays, industry consists of vehicle manufacturing and logistics.

== Demography ==
Historical population

Year	Pop.	±% p.a.
1793	570	—
1821	802	+1.23%
1841	851	+0.30%
1871	763	−0.36%
1900	615	−0.74%
1926	605	−0.06%
1946	612	+0.06%
1962	766	+1.41%
1968	930	+3.29%

Year	Pop.	±% p.a.
1975	984	+0.81%
1982	1,123	+1.91%
1990	1,172	+0.54%
1999	1,278	+0.97%
2007	1,283	+0.05%
2012	1,511	+3.33%
2017	1,716	+2.58%
2023	1,522	−1.98%

Source: EHESS and INSEE

== Sights ==
The region, with its rich and varied historical heritage, lends itself to eco-tourism.

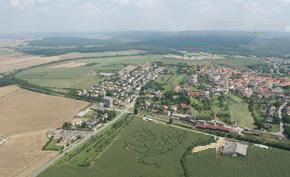
Field maze

=== Field Maze ===
Visitors find their way through the corn maze by solving puzzles signposted along the route.

There is a field maze, which is open from July to September. Each year there is a new field Maze.

=== Steam train ===
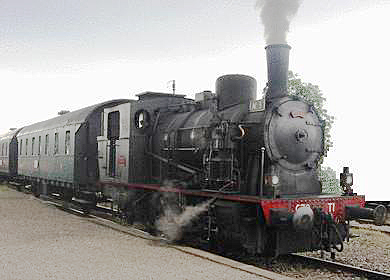
Train located in Vigy

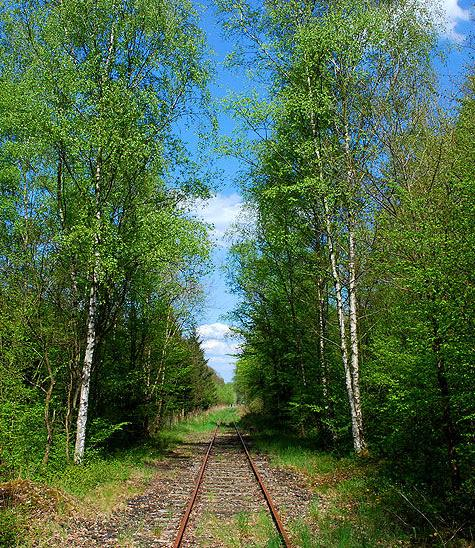

This line was linked to the former SNCF Vigy to Hombourg-Budange one. In 1985, the local authorities had stopped supporting the line. ALEMF operated in this line with the definition of a "touristic" railway since 1986.

On 1 April 1908 was put in regular circulation the first engine at vapor. The line celebrated its centenary on 24 May 2008.

It is open from April to October.

=== Rail-cycle (Velorail in French) ===
Rail-cycle with 4 wheels. A single bicycle may also be modified with an outrigger and locating wheels to operate upon rails

- Forest outing
- Booking recommended

It is open from April to October.

=== Notre-Dame-de-Rabas ===
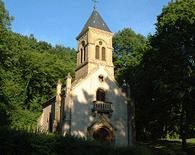
Churche - Rabas

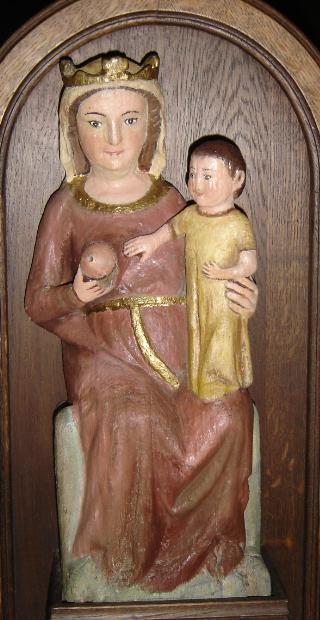
Madonna and Child : Notre-Dame-De-Rabas

As the legend says: Once upon a time a group of hunter was following a deer in the forest of St. Hubert. It was a very very hot day and the people were very thirsty. They have been suffering when suddenly their horses found a spring. To thank it for the nature they built a little chapel next to the spring.

The chapel is linked in legend to Charlemagne and may have existed as early as 806.

In 1049, the Pope Leo IX would have come to devote the church. During the centuries the church of St. Arnold had the authority above the chapel.

Unfortunately, during the French Revolution the chapel was destroyed. Later the chapel has been rebuilt.

In 1884, the reconstruction of the chapel started by Abbé Cazin and the Vicomte de Coetlosquet offered three windows for the chapel. It got the shape we can see now.

Today, there are a new small church in the middle of forest. On the Monday of Pentecost and Corpus Christi (feast) pilgrims come to the chapel.

=== Adeppa ===
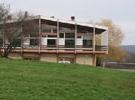
ADEPPA

In 1961, associations and federations of popular education of the Moselle, mobilized around common values ("to allow each citizen to be an actor of the transformation of a company where the Man finds finally his true place"). In 1963, the association ADEPPA of which the goal was to become a training centre of the actors of community life, with the possibility of accommodating, in its houses of lodging, of many groups in the middle of an exceptional landscape

Adeppa is located at Vigy. Adeppa is a popular resort on the edge of a forest.

=== Others ===
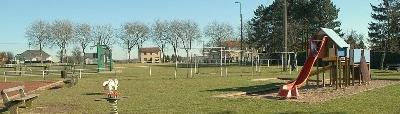
Château-d’Eau street

Vigy is known for its dynamism and its strong associative fabric with more than forty associations.

==== Sports ====
- Judo, tennis, handball, skittles, gymnastics, coil-defense, tennis, football clubs
- Game of bowls Vigy.

==== Music ====
Battery brass band “the Jeanne of Arc”

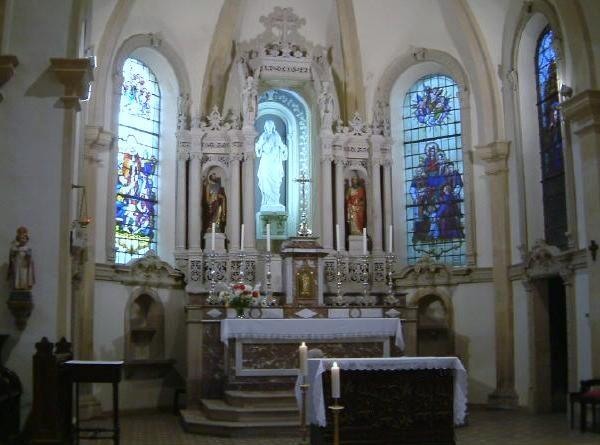
Chorus of the Saint-Léger churche - Two stained glass windows were erected, on the right to commemorate "Notre-Dame-de-Rabas", on the left to commemorate Leodegar.

=== Civil heritage ===
- Arboretum
- "Église Saint-Léger" (churche - 1868)
- Since La maison du Jambon was founded by Augustin Mazzocchi in 1920.

=== Sisters of Divine Providence (Soeurs de la divine providence) in Vigy (Hessange) ===
The Congregation of the Sisters of Divine Providence was founded by John Martin Moye, who with the assistance of Mademoiselle Marguerite LeComte, opened the first school of congregation at Vigy in 1762. After the French Revolution, all sisters was transferred to St. Jean de Bassel in Lorraine.

== Films & documents ==
You can watch few minutes in Vigy in these French films

- Life and Nothing But ( "la vie et rien d'autre" French title, French film, French director : Bertrand Tavernier)
- Je m'appelle Victor (French film, French director : Guy Jacques)

others documents on TV (RTL, TF1, ZDF) on radio (France Inter, online on France Bleu Lorraine Nord radio on August 9, 2009 )

== Education ==
The Congregation of the Sisters of Divine Providence was founded by John Martin Moye, who with the assistance of Mademoiselle Marguerite LeComte, opened the first school of congregation at Vigy in 1762. After the French Revolution, all sisters was transferred to St. Jean de Bassel in Lorraine.

Today there are three public schools.

== Infrastructure ==
Vigy is located at the intersection of two majors axes: A4 motorway (going from Paris to Strasbourg) and the A31 motorway (going to Luxembourg at the North and towards Nancy)

- A4 - Number 37 - Ennery-Argancy
- A31 - Hauconcourt

The nearest railway station is in Metz, about 15 km (9.3 mi) away.

The nearest airports are ETZ - Metz Nancy Lorraine 24.5 km (15.2 mi) south, LUX - Luxemburg Luxembourg 47.9 km (29.8 mi) north, ENC - Nancy Essey 56.7 km (35.2 mi) south, SCN - Saarbruecken Saarbrücken 59.0 km (36.7 mi) east

- by bus : Going to Metz city or Hagondange station. There are only one bus by day (daily : Monday to Saturday)

The 400,000 volt line connecting Marlenheim (near Strasbourg) to Vigy entered service on April 30, 2009 is the fruit of a consultative process initiated back in 1998. Other line connecting Germany, and Luxembourg.

The dispatching of Vigy reinforcing the electricity transmission capacities of France’s greater eastern area.

== Notable people ==
- Catherine Marsal, born 20 January 1971 in Metz, is a retired female racing cyclist from France. She represented her native country at four Summer Olympics: 1988, 1992, 1996, and 2000. Her biggest achievements were winning the 1990 Giro d'Italia Femminile and the world title in the women's individual road race (1990).
- Jean-Martin Moye

== Twin towns and sister cities ==
- Mussidan, France; since 1990
- Sourzac; since 1991

== See also ==
- Communes of the Moselle department
- Geography of Saarland, Moselle, and Luxembourg
