= Neuvic, Dordogne =

Neuvic
- Commune
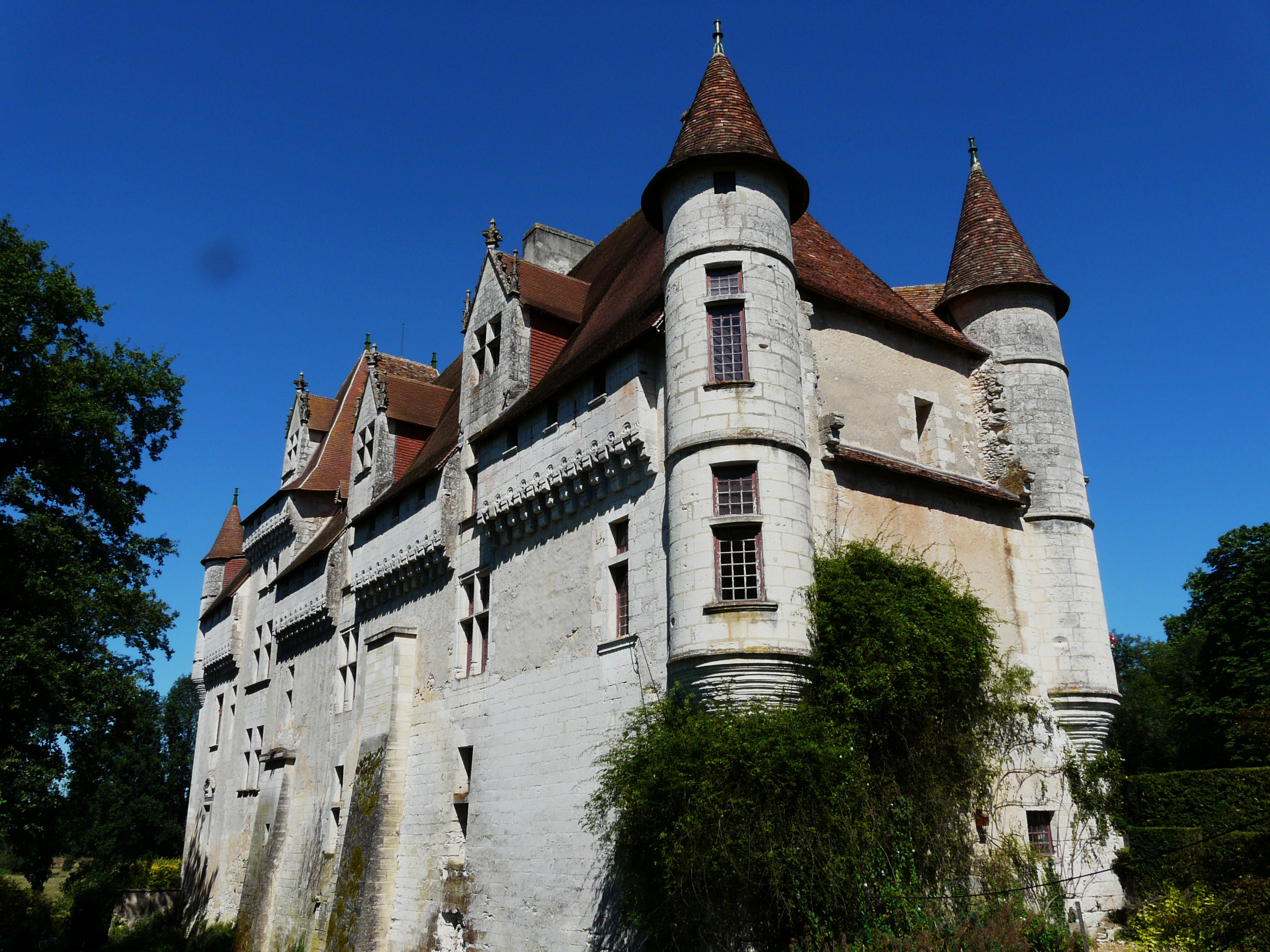
- Chateau

- Coat of arms
- Location of Neuvic
- Location within France Location within Nouvelle-Aquitaine
- Coordinates: 45°06′05″N 0°28′11″E
- Country: France
- Region: Nouvelle-Aquitaine
- Department: Dordogne
- Arrondissement: Périgueux
- Canton: Vallée de l'Isle

Government
  - Mayor (2021–2026): Paulette Sicre-Doyotte
- Area^{1}: 25.82 km^{2} (9.97 sq mi)
- Highest elevation: 187 m (614 ft)
- Lowest elevation: 51 m (167 ft)
- Population (2023): 3,687
  - Density: 142.8/km^{2} (369.8/sq mi)
- Time zone: UTC+01:00 (CET)
  - Summer (DST): UTC+02:00 (CEST)
- INSEE/Postal code: 24309 /24190
- ^{1} French Land Register data, which excludes lakes, ponds, glaciers > 1 km^{2} (0.386 sq mi or 247 acres) and river estuaries.

Neuvic or Neuvic-sur-l'Isle (French pronunciation: [nøvik]; Limousin: Nuòuvic) is a commune in the southwestern French department of Dordogne. Neuvic station has rail connections to Bordeaux, Périgueux, Brive-la-Gaillarde and Limoges.

== Population ==
Historical population
Year	Pop.	±% p.a.
1968	2,669	—
1975	2,880	+1.09%
1982	2,782	−0.49%
1990	2,737	−0.20%
1999	3,315	+2.15%
2007	3,545	+0.84%
2012	3,566	+0.12%
2017	3,589	+0.13%
2023	3,687	+0.45%
Source: INSEE

== Sights ==
- Parc botanique de Neuvic

== See also ==
- Communes of the Dordogne department
