= Château de Saint-Germain-du-Salembre =

Château in Nouvelle-Aquitaine, France

Coordinates: 45°08′21″N 0°27′03″E

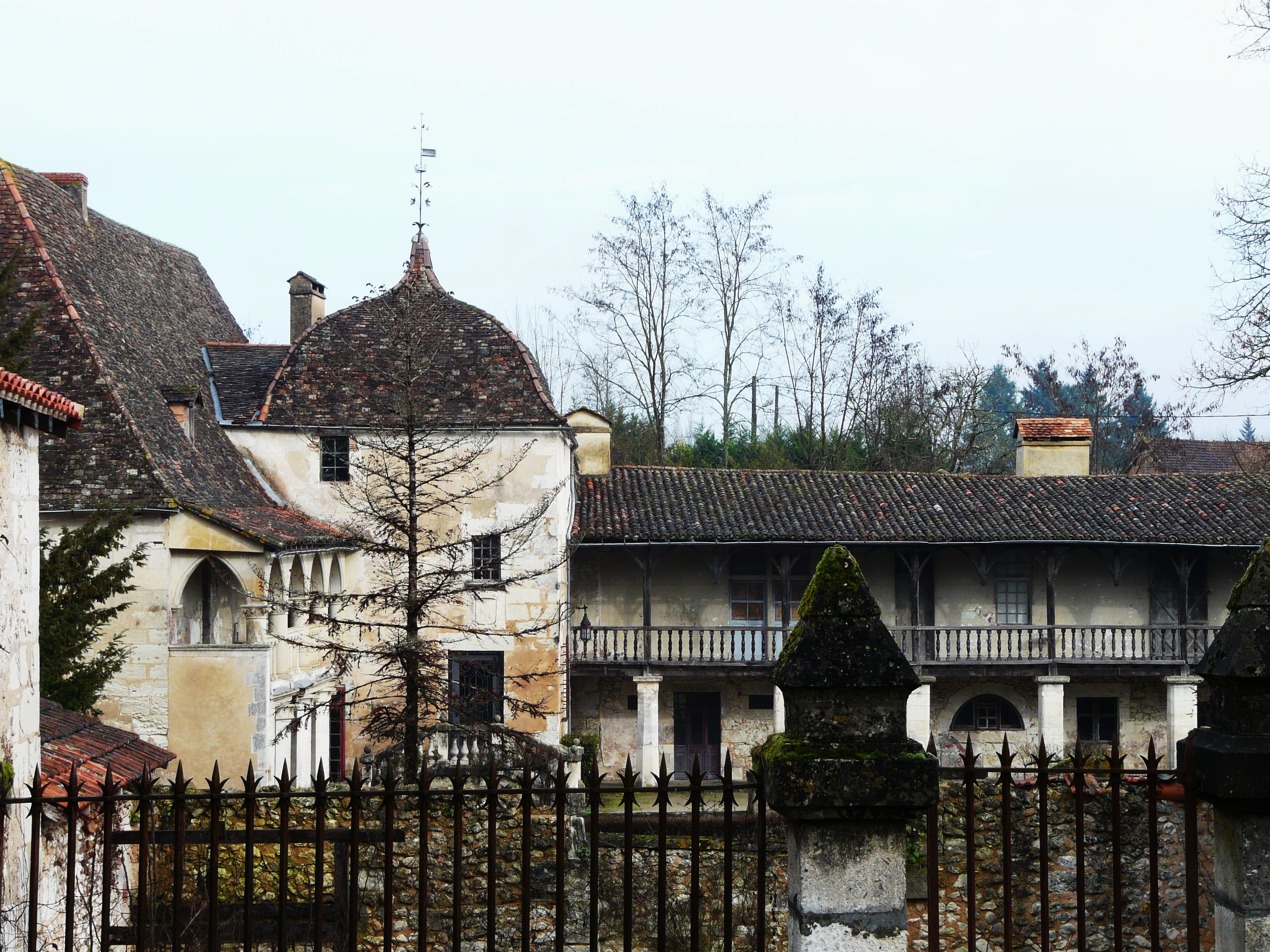
Château de Saint-Germain-du-Salembre

Château de Saint-Germain-du-Salembre is a château in Saint-Germain-du-Salembre, Dordogne, Nouvelle-Aquitaine, France.
