= Saint-Germain-du-Salembre =

- Commune
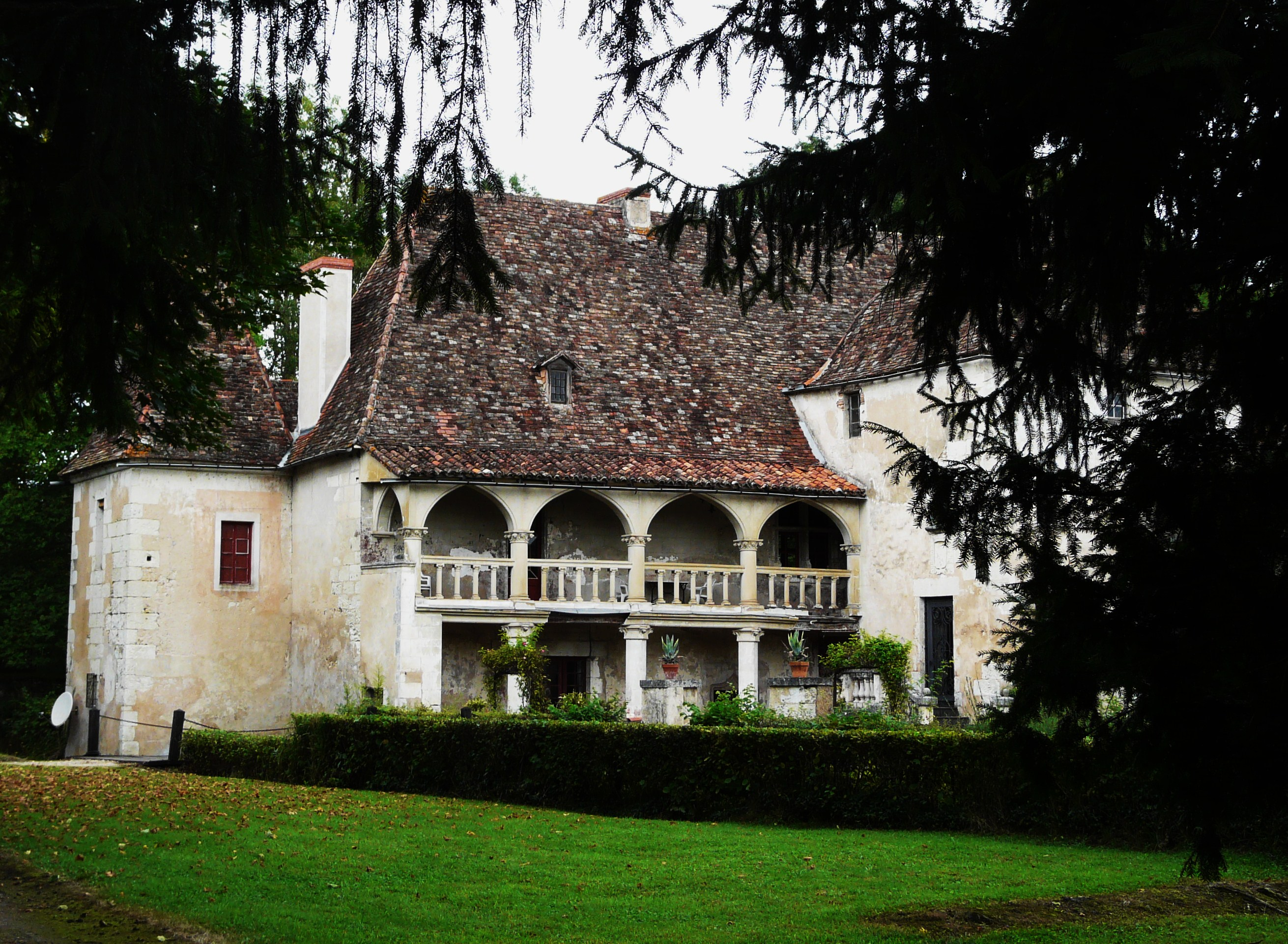
- Chateau of Saint-Germain-du Salembre
- Location of Saint-Germain-du-Salembre
- Location within France Location within Nouvelle-Aquitaine
- Coordinates: 45°08′20″N 0°27′02″E
- Country: France
- Region: Nouvelle-Aquitaine
- Department: Dordogne
- Arrondissement: Périgueux
- Canton: Vallée de l'Isle

Government
  - Mayor (2020–2026): Sandra Pinheiro Paillot
- Area^{1}: 19.55 km^{2} (7.55 sq mi)
- Elevation: 85 m (279 ft)
- Highest elevation: 184 m (604 ft)
- Lowest elevation: 55 m (180 ft)
- Population (2023): 901
  - Density: 46.1/km^{2} (119/sq mi)
- Time zone: UTC+01:00 (CET)
  - Summer (DST): UTC+02:00 (CEST)
- INSEE/Postal code: 24418 /24190
- ^{1} French Land Register data, which excludes lakes, ponds, glaciers > 1 km^{2} (0.386 sq mi or 247 acres) and river estuaries.

Saint-Germain-du-Salembre (Limousin: Sent German de Salembre) is a commune in the Dordogne department in Nouvelle-Aquitaine in southwestern France. The Château de Saint-Germain-du-Salembre is found here.

== Population ==
Historical population
Year	Pop.	±% p.a.
1968	790	—
1975	837	+0.83%
1982	837	+0.00%
1990	787	−0.77%
1999	762	−0.36%
2007	827	+1.03%
2012	925	+2.27%
2017	941	+0.34%
2023	901	−0.72%
Source: INSEE

== See also ==
- Communes of the Dordogne department
