= Loue (Isle) =

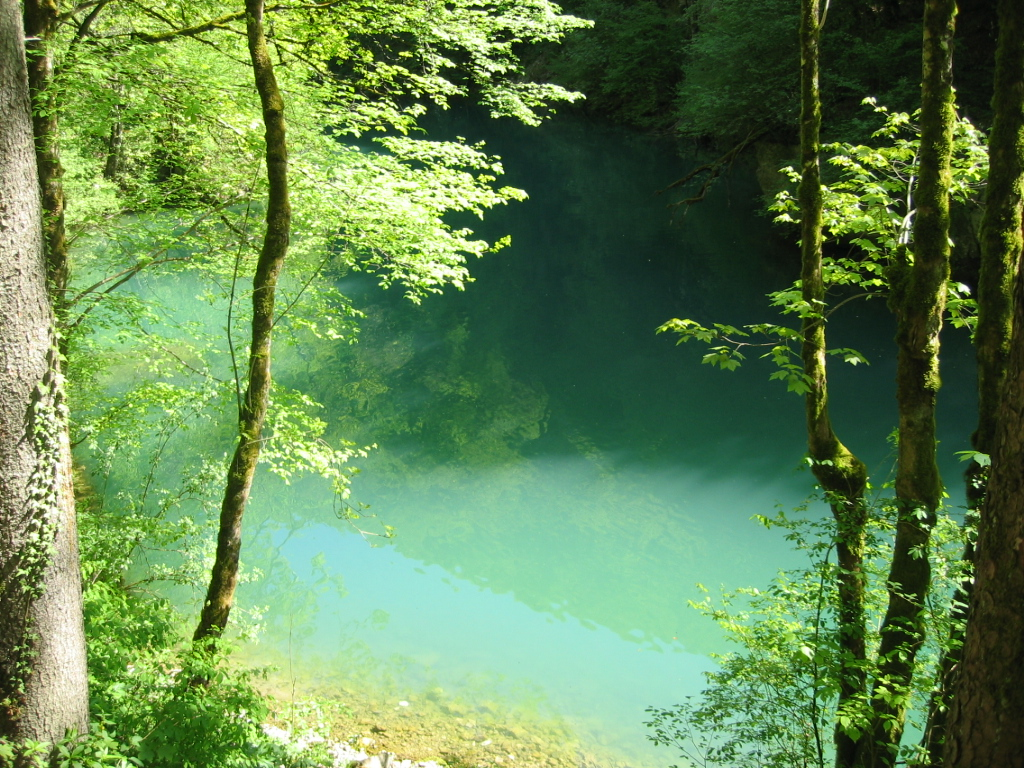

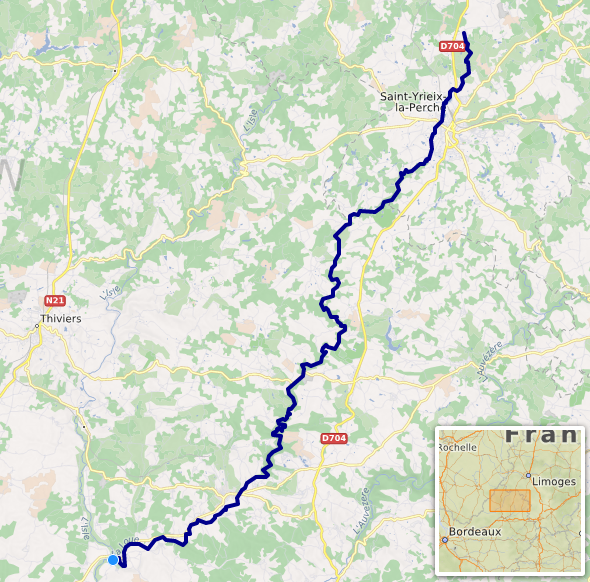

Location
- Country: France

Physical characteristics
- Source
  - location: Massif Central
- Mouth
  - location: Isle
  - coordinates: 45°18′19″N 0°58′22″E
- Length: 51 km (32 mi)
- Basin size: 198 km^{2} (76 sq mi)
- Discharge
  - average: 2.91 m^{3}/s (103 cu ft/s) at Saint-Médard-d'Excideuil

Basin features
- Progression: Isle→ Dordogne→ Gironde estuary→ Atlantic Ocean

The Loue (French pronunciation: [lu]; Occitan: Loa) is a 51 km long river in the Nouvelle-Aquitaine region of France. It is a tributary of the Isle, itself a tributary of the Dordogne.

The source of the river is in the commune of Saint-Yrieix-la-Perche in the Massif Central. It runs through the Haute-Vienne department, and empties into the Isle near Coulaures in the Dordogne department. Its main tributaries are the Haute Loue and the Ravillou.

== Places ==
- Haute-Vienne: Saint-Yrieix-la-Perche
- Dordogne: Excideuil, Coulaures

== Hydrology ==
The mean annual discharge, measured at Saint-Médard-d'Excideuil, is 2.91 m3/s. The highest flow was measured during a flash flood on September 22, 1993: 111 m3/s (daily average).
