= Saint-Jean-d'Ataux =

- Commune
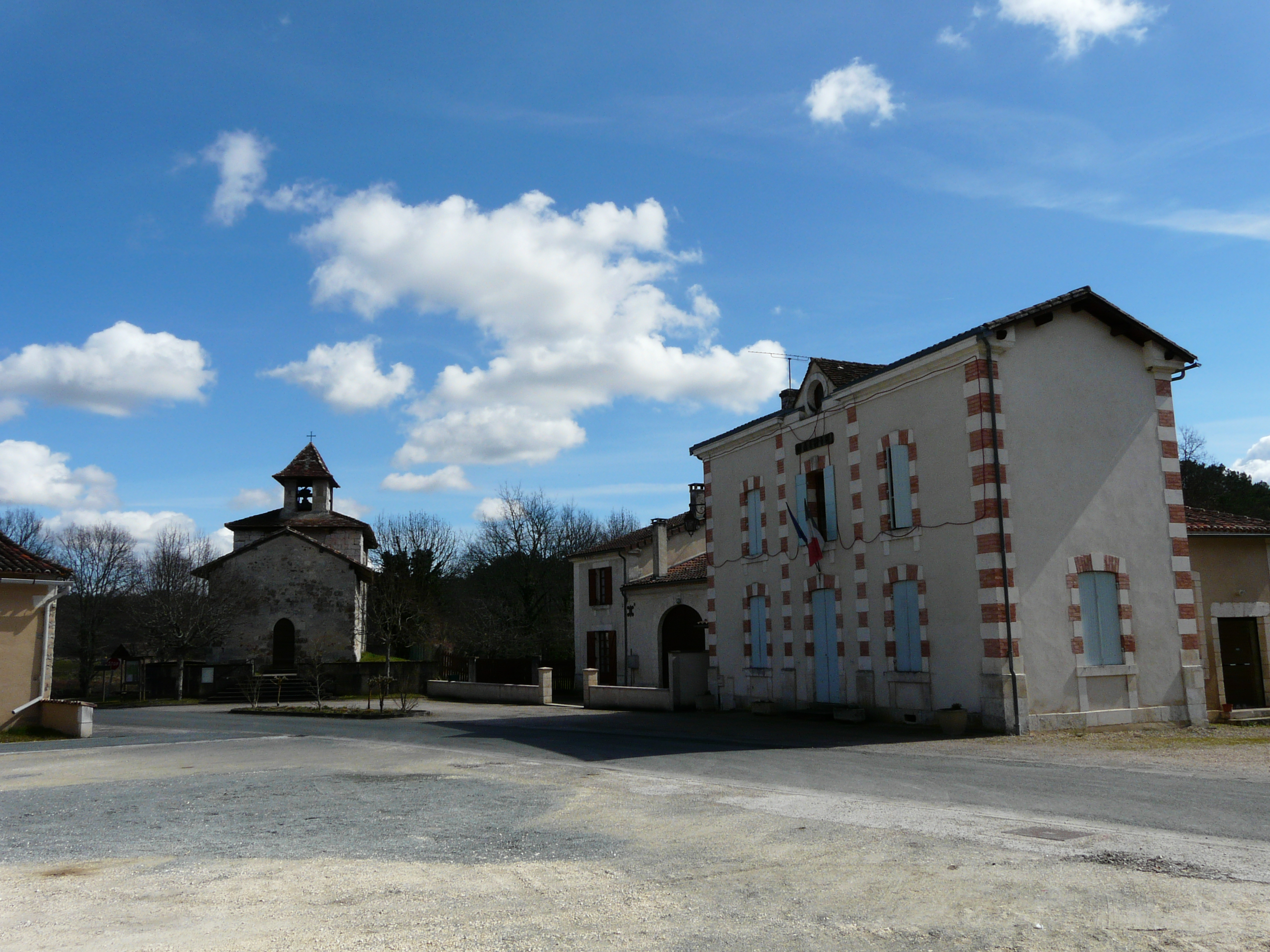
- The town hall and church in Saint-Jean-d'Ataux
- Location of Saint-Jean-d'Ataux
- Location within France Location within Nouvelle-Aquitaine
- Coordinates: 45°08′37″N 0°24′38″E
- Country: France
- Region: Nouvelle-Aquitaine
- Department: Dordogne
- Arrondissement: Périgueux
- Canton: Vallée de l'Isle

Government
  - Mayor (2020–2026): Jean-Michel Sébastien
- Area^{1}: 12.11 km^{2} (4.68 sq mi)
- Highest elevation: 157 m (515 ft)
- Lowest elevation: 71 m (233 ft)
- Population (2023): 129
  - Density: 10.7/km^{2} (27.6/sq mi)
- Time zone: UTC+01:00 (CET)
  - Summer (DST): UTC+02:00 (CEST)
- INSEE/Postal code: 24424 /24190
- ^{1} French Land Register data, which excludes lakes, ponds, glaciers > 1 km^{2} (0.386 sq mi or 247 acres) and river estuaries.

Saint-Jean-d'Ataux (French pronunciation: [sɛ̃ ʒɑ̃ dato]; Limousin: Sent Joan d'Astaus) is a commune in the Dordogne department in Nouvelle-Aquitaine in southwestern France.

== Population ==
Historical population
Year	Pop.	±% p.a.
1968	119	—
1975	94	−3.31%
1982	127	+4.39%
1990	136	+0.86%
1999	150	+1.09%
2007	122	−2.55%
2012	118	−0.66%
2017	128	+1.64%
2023	129	+0.13%
Source: INSEE

== See also ==
- Communes of the Dordogne department
