= Sourzac =

- Commune
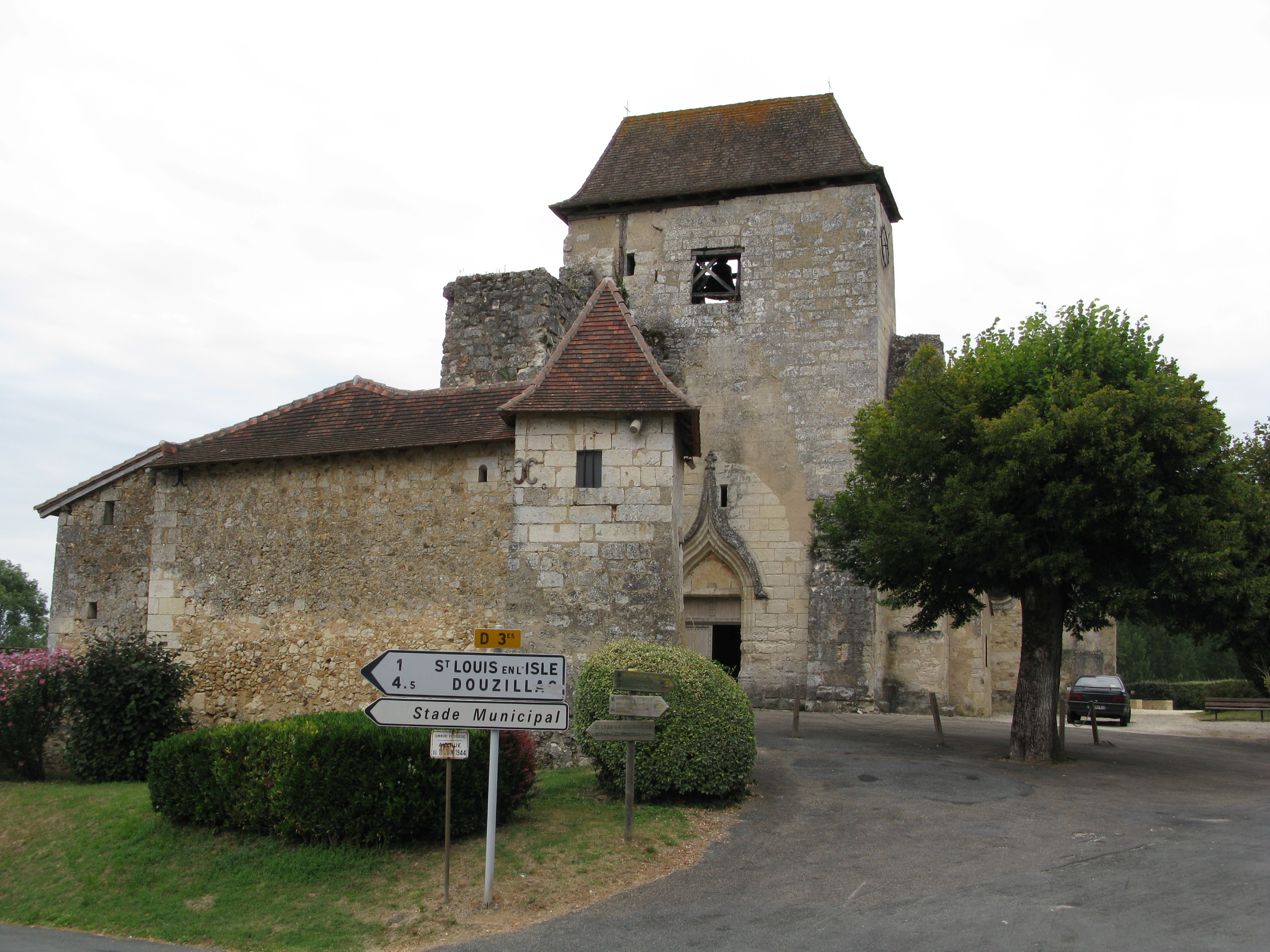
- The church in Sourzac
- Location of Sourzac
- Location within France Location within Nouvelle-Aquitaine
- Coordinates: 45°02′59″N 0°23′48″E
- Country: France
- Region: Nouvelle-Aquitaine
- Department: Dordogne
- Arrondissement: Périgueux
- Canton: Vallée de l'Isle

Government
  - Mayor (2020–2026): Philippe Perlumiere
- Area^{1}: 23.37 km^{2} (9.02 sq mi)
- Elevation: 90 m (300 ft)
- Highest elevation: 186 m (610 ft)
- Lowest elevation: 43 m (141 ft)
- Population (2023): 1,135
  - Density: 48.57/km^{2} (125.8/sq mi)
- Time zone: UTC+01:00 (CET)
  - Summer (DST): UTC+02:00 (CEST)
- INSEE/Postal code: 24543 /24400
- ^{1} French Land Register data, which excludes lakes, ponds, glaciers > 1 km^{2} (0.386 sq mi or 247 acres) and river estuaries.

Sourzac (French pronunciation: [suʁzak]; Occitan: Sorzac) is a commune in the Dordogne department in Nouvelle-Aquitaine in southwestern France.

== Population ==
Historical population
Year	Pop.	±% p.a.
1968	1,015	—
1975	1,020	+0.07%
1982	1,020	+0.00%
1990	1,011	−0.11%
1999	1,032	+0.23%
2007	1,086	+0.64%
2012	1,106	+0.37%
2017	1,107	+0.02%
2023	1,135	+0.42%
Source: INSEE

== International relations ==
Twinned with Vigy since 1991.

== See also ==
- Communes of the Dordogne département
