= Parc botanique de Neuvic =

Botanical garden in Neuvic-Sur-L'Isle, Dordogne, Aquitaine, France

Coordinates: 45°06′05″N 0°28′11″E

The Parc botanique de Neuvic (6 hectares) is a botanical garden located in Neuvic-Sur-L'Isle, Dordogne, Aquitaine, France. It is open daily in the warmer months; an admission fee is charged when in flower.

The park is located on an island, and surrounds a château built in 1520 with both medieval and 18th century elements. Since 1950 the château has served as a home for children operated by the Fondation Hospice des Orphelines de Périgueux.

The botanical park was established in 1993 by the Société Botanique du Périgord, the Syndicat d'Initiative de Neuvic, and the Institut Médico-Educatif, and opened to the public in 1995. It currently contains about 1,000 plants representing 30 genera, primarily those indigenous to Dordogne, including oak, maple, dogwood, magnolia, willow, and old varieties of apple, as well as deutzia, hibiscus, hydrangea, and peony. The park also contains a romantic grotto in the style of the 18th century.

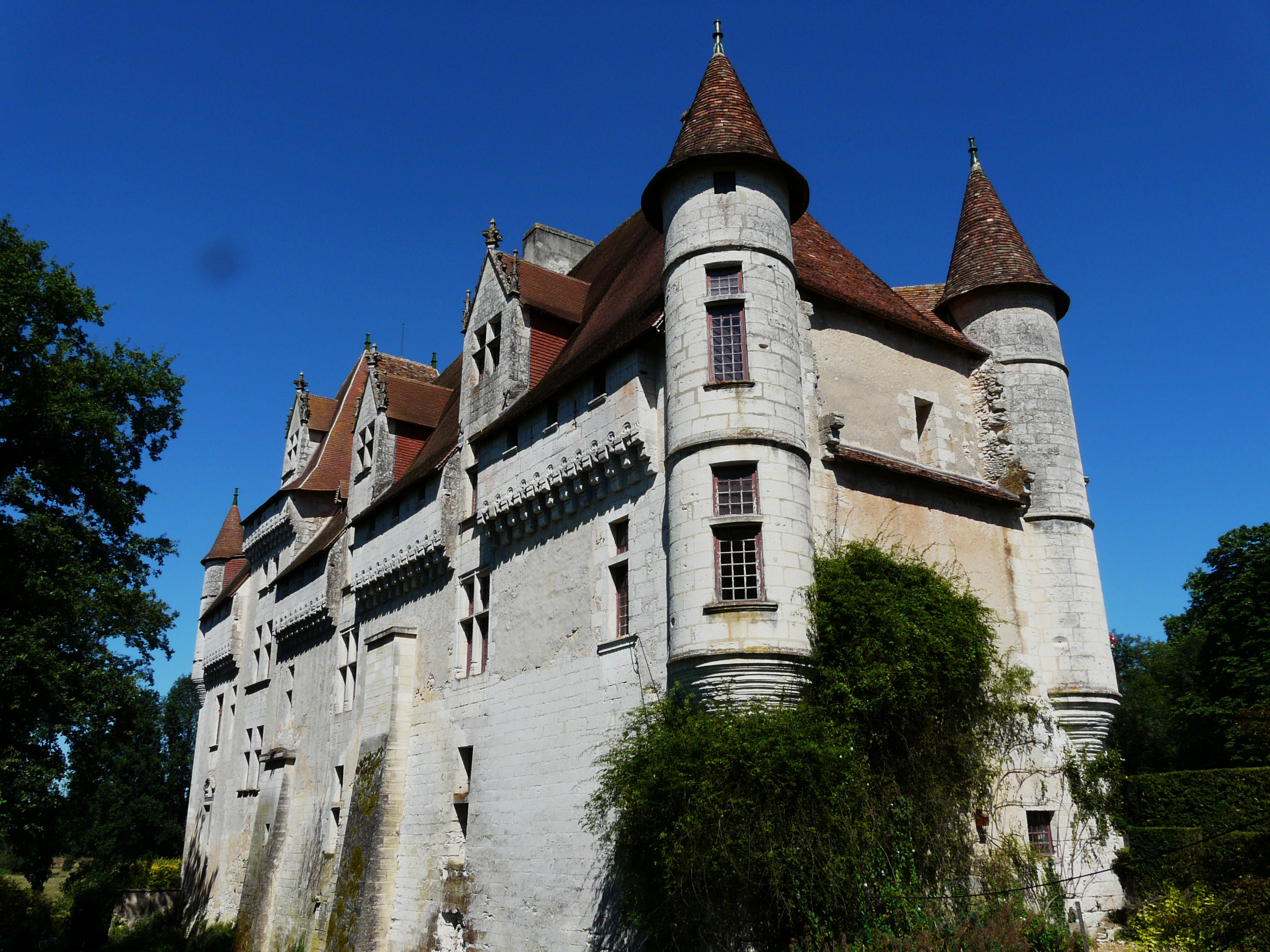
Parc botanique de Neuvic

== See also ==
- List of botanical gardens in France
