= Saint-Séverin-d'Estissac =

- Commune
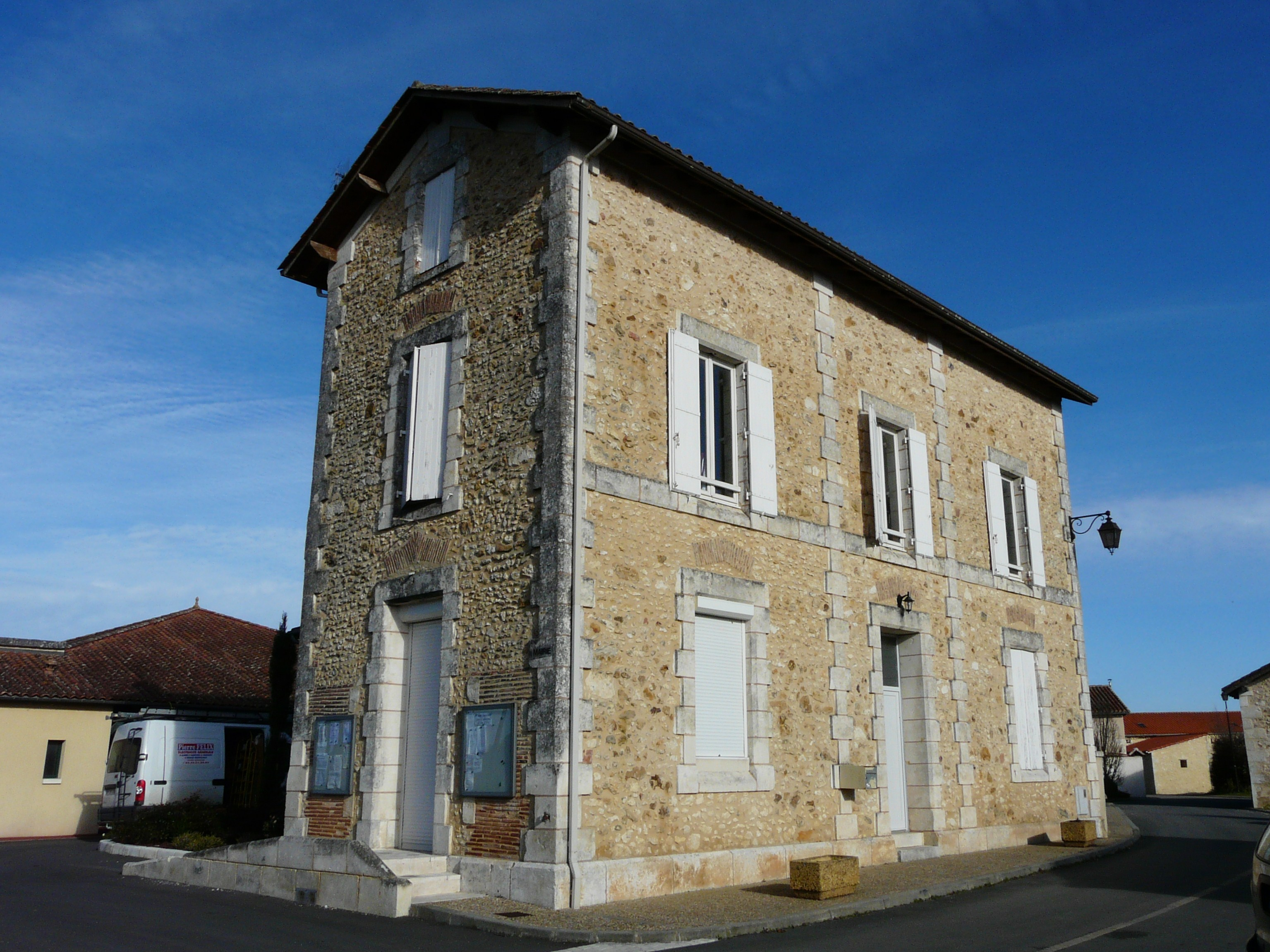
- The town hall in Saint-Séverin-d'Estissac
- Location of Saint-Séverin-d'Estissac
- Location within France Location within Nouvelle-Aquitaine
- Coordinates: 45°03′08″N 0°28′41″E
- Country: France
- Region: Nouvelle-Aquitaine
- Department: Dordogne
- Arrondissement: Périgueux
- Canton: Vallée de l'Isle

Government
  - Mayor (2020–2026): Sébastien Schaller
- Area^{1}: 5.31 km^{2} (2.05 sq mi)
- Elevation: 171 m (561 ft)
- Highest elevation: 202 m (663 ft)
- Lowest elevation: 111 m (364 ft)
- Population (2023): 95
  - Density: 18/km^{2} (46/sq mi)
- Time zone: UTC+01:00 (CET)
  - Summer (DST): UTC+02:00 (CEST)
- INSEE/Postal code: 24502 /24190
- ^{1} French Land Register data, which excludes lakes, ponds, glaciers > 1 km^{2} (0.386 sq mi or 247 acres) and river estuaries.

Saint-Séverin-d'Estissac (French pronunciation: [sɛ̃ sevʁɛ̃ dɛstisak]) is a commune in the Dordogne department in Nouvelle-Aquitaine in southwestern France.

== Population ==
Historical population
Year	Pop.	±% p.a.
1968	65	—
1975	51	−3.41%
1982	56	+1.35%
1990	55	−0.22%
1999	51	−0.84%
2007	70	+4.04%
2012	89	+4.92%
2017	100	+2.36%
2023	95	−0.85%
Source: INSEE

== See also ==
- Communes of the Dordogne department
