= Saint-Étienne-de-Puycorbier =

- Commune
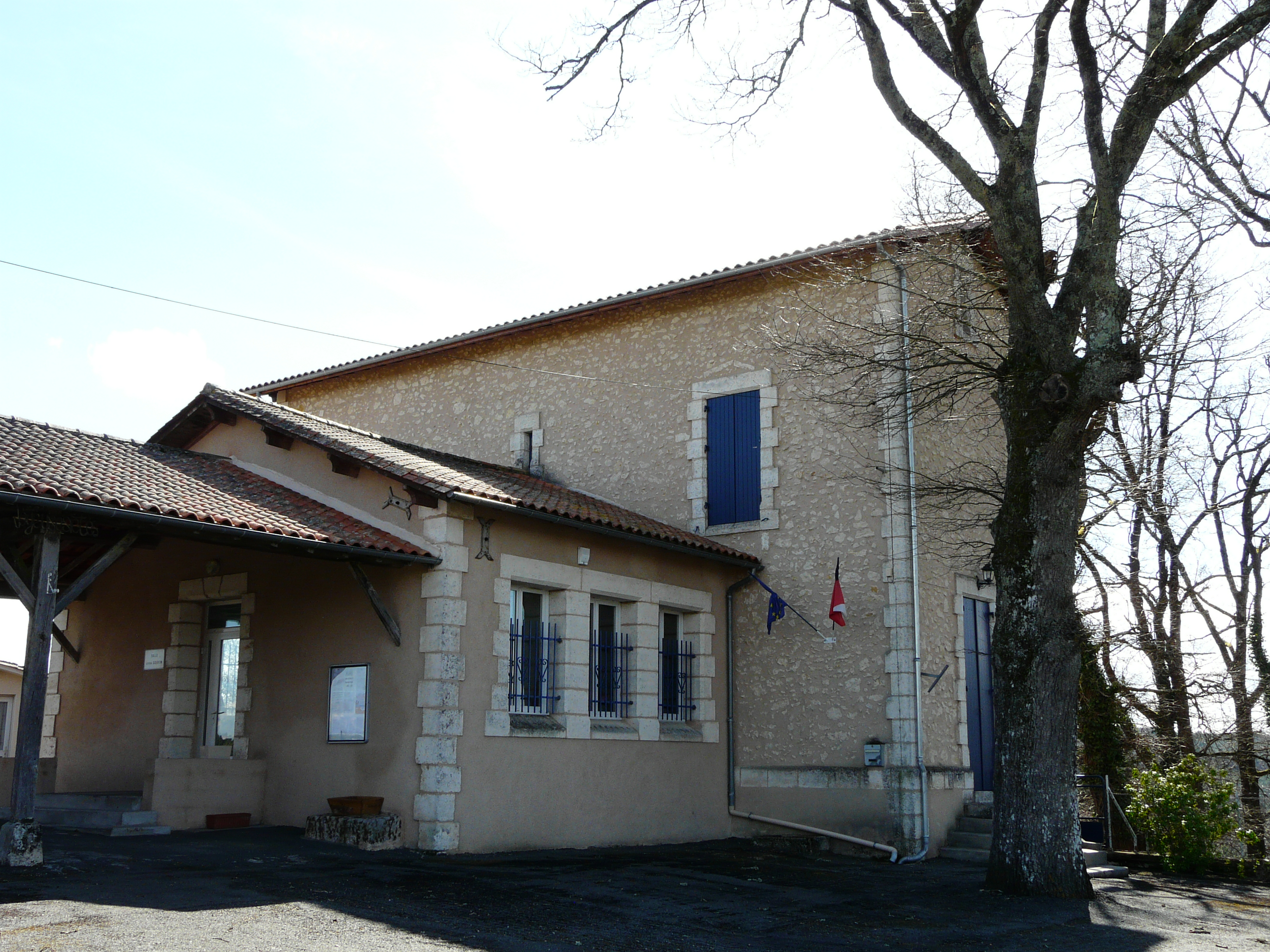
- The town hall in Saint-Étienne-de-Puycorbier
- Location of Saint-Étienne-de-Puycorbier
- Location within France Location within Nouvelle-Aquitaine
- Coordinates: 45°05′37″N 0°19′50″E
- Country: France
- Region: Nouvelle-Aquitaine
- Department: Dordogne
- Arrondissement: Périgueux
- Canton: Vallée de l'Isle

Government
  - Mayor (2020–2026): Dominique Degeix
- Area^{1}: 13.54 km^{2} (5.23 sq mi)
- Elevation: 90 m (300 ft)
- Highest elevation: 157 m (515 ft)
- Lowest elevation: 50 m (160 ft)
- Population (2023): 111
  - Density: 8.20/km^{2} (21.2/sq mi)
- Time zone: UTC+01:00 (CET)
  - Summer (DST): UTC+02:00 (CEST)
- INSEE/Postal code: 24399 /24400
- ^{1} French Land Register data, which excludes lakes, ponds, glaciers > 1 km^{2} (0.386 sq mi or 247 acres) and river estuaries.

Saint-Étienne-de-Puycorbier (French pronunciation: [sɛ̃.t‿etjɛn də pɥikɔʁbje]; Limousin: Sent Estefe de Pueicorbier) is a commune in the Dordogne department in Nouvelle-Aquitaine in southwestern France.

== Population ==
Historical population
Year	Pop.	±% p.a.
1968	124	—
1975	99	−3.17%
1982	117	+2.42%
1990	118	+0.11%
1999	113	−0.48%
2007	102	−1.27%
2012	116	+2.61%
2017	106	−1.79%
2023	111	+0.77%
Source: INSEE

== See also ==
- Communes of the Dordogne department
