= Beauronne, Dordogne =

Beauronne
- Commune
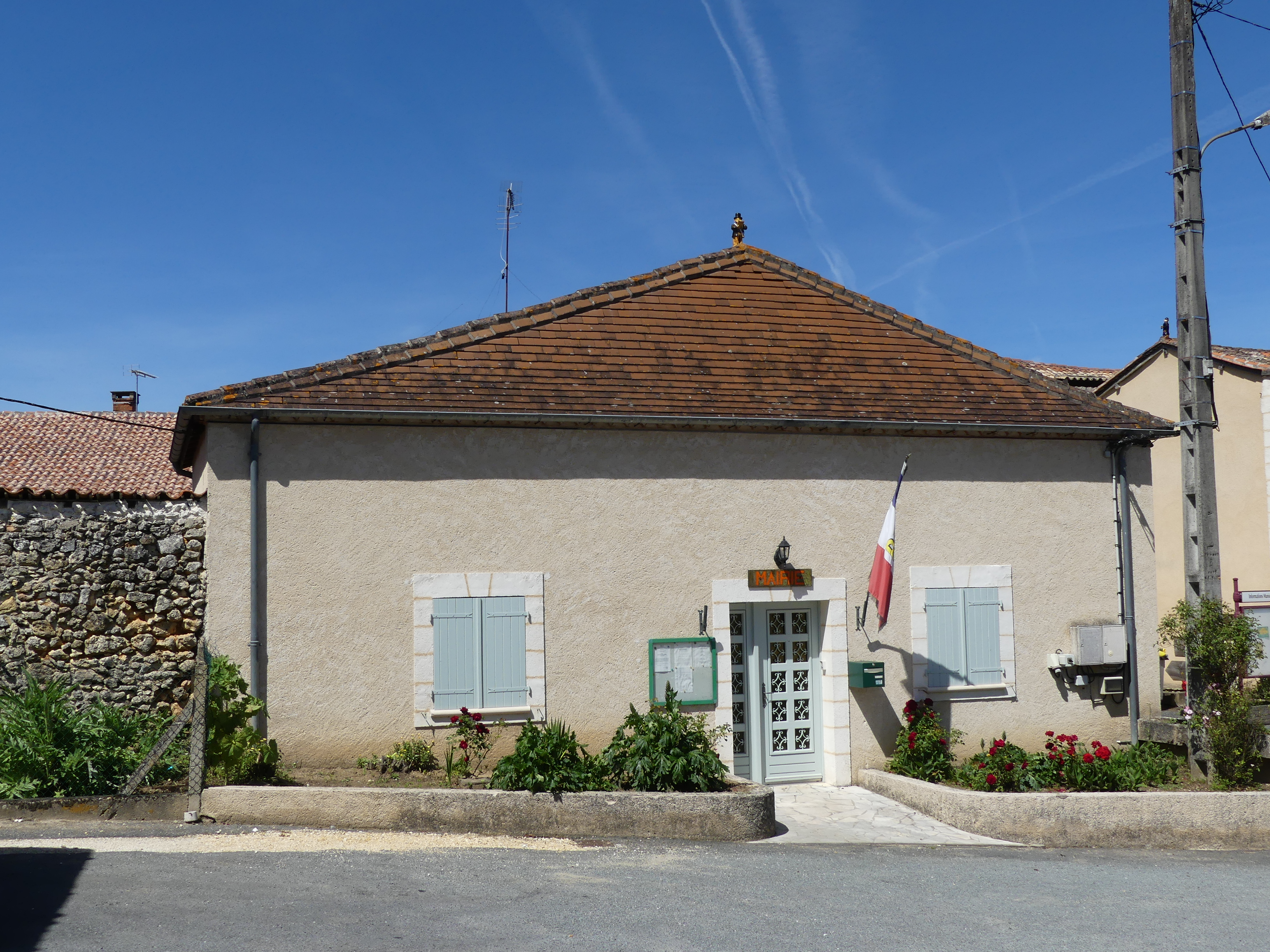
- The town hall in Beauronne
- Location of Beauronne
- Location within France Location within Nouvelle-Aquitaine
- Coordinates: 45°05′45″N 0°22′59″E
- Country: France
- Region: Nouvelle-Aquitaine
- Department: Dordogne
- Arrondissement: Périgueux
- Canton: Vallée de l'Isle

Government
  - Mayor (2020–2026): Daniel Villesuzanne
- Area^{1}: 19.24 km^{2} (7.43 sq mi)
- Elevation: 68 m (223 ft)
- Highest elevation: 150 m (490 ft)
- Lowest elevation: 51 m (167 ft)
- Population (2023): 372
  - Density: 19.3/km^{2} (50.1/sq mi)
- Time zone: UTC+01:00 (CET)
  - Summer (DST): UTC+02:00 (CEST)
- INSEE/Postal code: 24032 /24400
- ^{1} French Land Register data, which excludes lakes, ponds, glaciers > 1 km^{2} (0.386 sq mi or 247 acres) and river estuaries.

Beauronne (French pronunciation: [boʁɔn]; Occitan: Beurona) is a commune in the Dordogne department in southwestern France.

== Population ==
Historical population
Year	Pop.	±% p.a.
1968	412	—
1975	350	−2.30%
1982	340	−0.41%
1990	328	−0.45%
1999	310	−0.63%
2007	299	−0.45%
2012	332	+2.12%
2017	372	+2.30%
2023	372	+0.00%
Source: INSEE

== See also ==
- Communes of the Dordogne department
