= Les Lèches =

- Commune
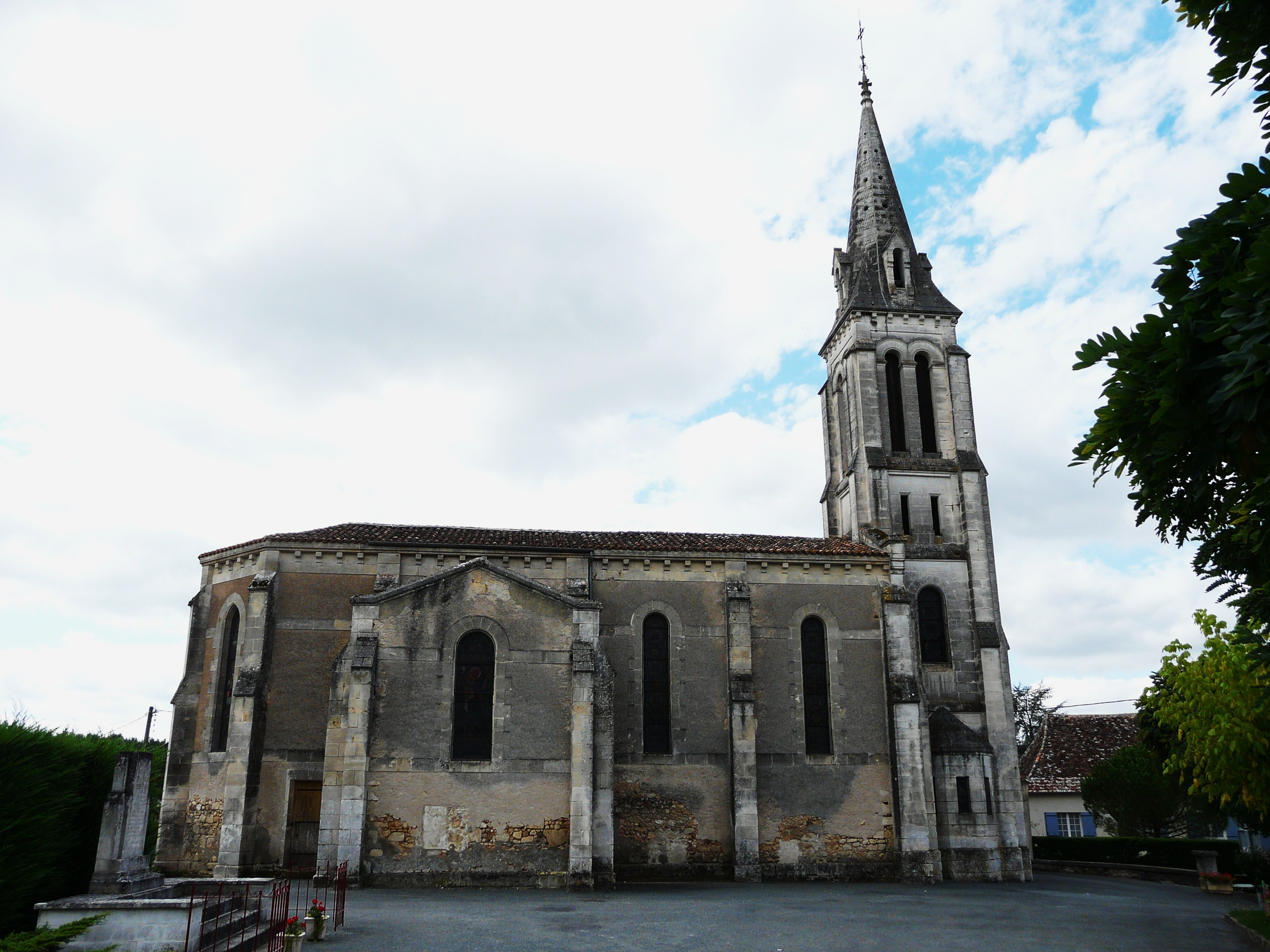
- The church in Les Lèches

- Coat of arms
- Location of Les Lèches
- Location within France Location within Nouvelle-Aquitaine
- Coordinates: 44°59′26″N 0°23′05″E
- Country: France
- Region: Nouvelle-Aquitaine
- Department: Dordogne
- Arrondissement: Périgueux
- Canton: Vallée de l'Isle
- Intercommunality: Isle et Crempse en Périgord

Government
  - Mayor (2020–2026): Odette Chaigneau
- Area^{1}: 21.58 km^{2} (8.33 sq mi)
- Elevation: 88 m (289 ft)
- Highest elevation: 167 m (548 ft)
- Lowest elevation: 64 m (210 ft)
- Population (2023): 389
  - Density: 18.0/km^{2} (46.7/sq mi)
- Time zone: UTC+01:00 (CET)
  - Summer (DST): UTC+02:00 (CEST)
- INSEE/Postal code: 24234 /24400
- ^{1} French Land Register data, which excludes lakes, ponds, glaciers > 1 km^{2} (0.386 sq mi or 247 acres) and river estuaries.

Les Lèches (French pronunciation: [le lɛʃ]; Occitan: Las Leschas) is a commune in the Dordogne department in Nouvelle-Aquitaine in southwestern France.

== Population ==
Historical population
Year	Pop.	±% p.a.
1968	324	—
1975	267	−2.73%
1982	257	−0.54%
1990	306	+2.21%
1999	298	−0.29%
2007	310	+0.49%
2012	343	+2.04%
2017	368	+1.42%
2023	389	+0.93%
Source: INSEE

== See also ==
- Communes of the Dordogne department
