= Isle (river) =

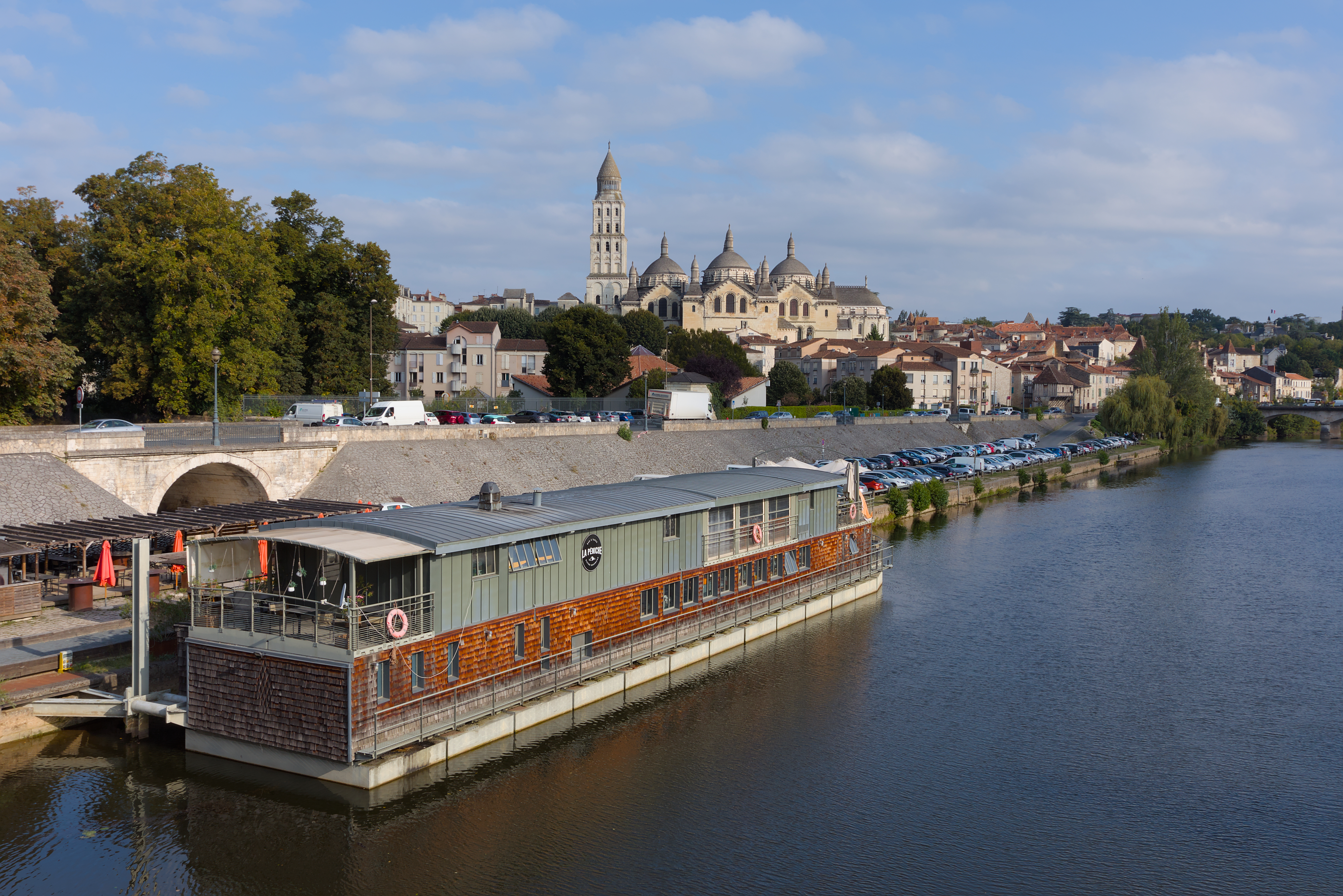
- Isle River in Périgueux

- Location within France Location within Nouvelle-Aquitaine

Location
- Country: France

Physical characteristics
- Source
  - location: Plateau de Millevaches
- Mouth
  - location: Dordogne
  - coordinates: 44°54′56″N 0°14′57″W
- Length: 255 km (158 mi)
- Basin size: 7,700 km^{2} (3,000 mi^{2})
- Discharge
  - average: 90 m^{3}/s (3,200 cu ft/s)

Basin features
- Progression: Dordogne→ Gironde estuary→ Atlantic Ocean

The Isle (French pronunciation: [il]; Occitan: Eila) is a 255-kilometre (158 mi) long river in south-western France, right tributary of the Dordogne. Its source is in the north-western Massif Central, near the town Nexon (south of Limoges). It flows south-west through the following départements and towns:

- Haute-Vienne: Le Chalard
- Dordogne: Périgueux, Mussidan
- Gironde: Libourne

It flows into the Dordogne in Libourne. Among the tributaries of the Isle are the Auvézère, the Loue, the Beauronne and the Dronne.
