= Saint-Macaire station =

Railway station in Saint-Macaire, France

Coordinates: 44°34′06″N 0°13′37″W

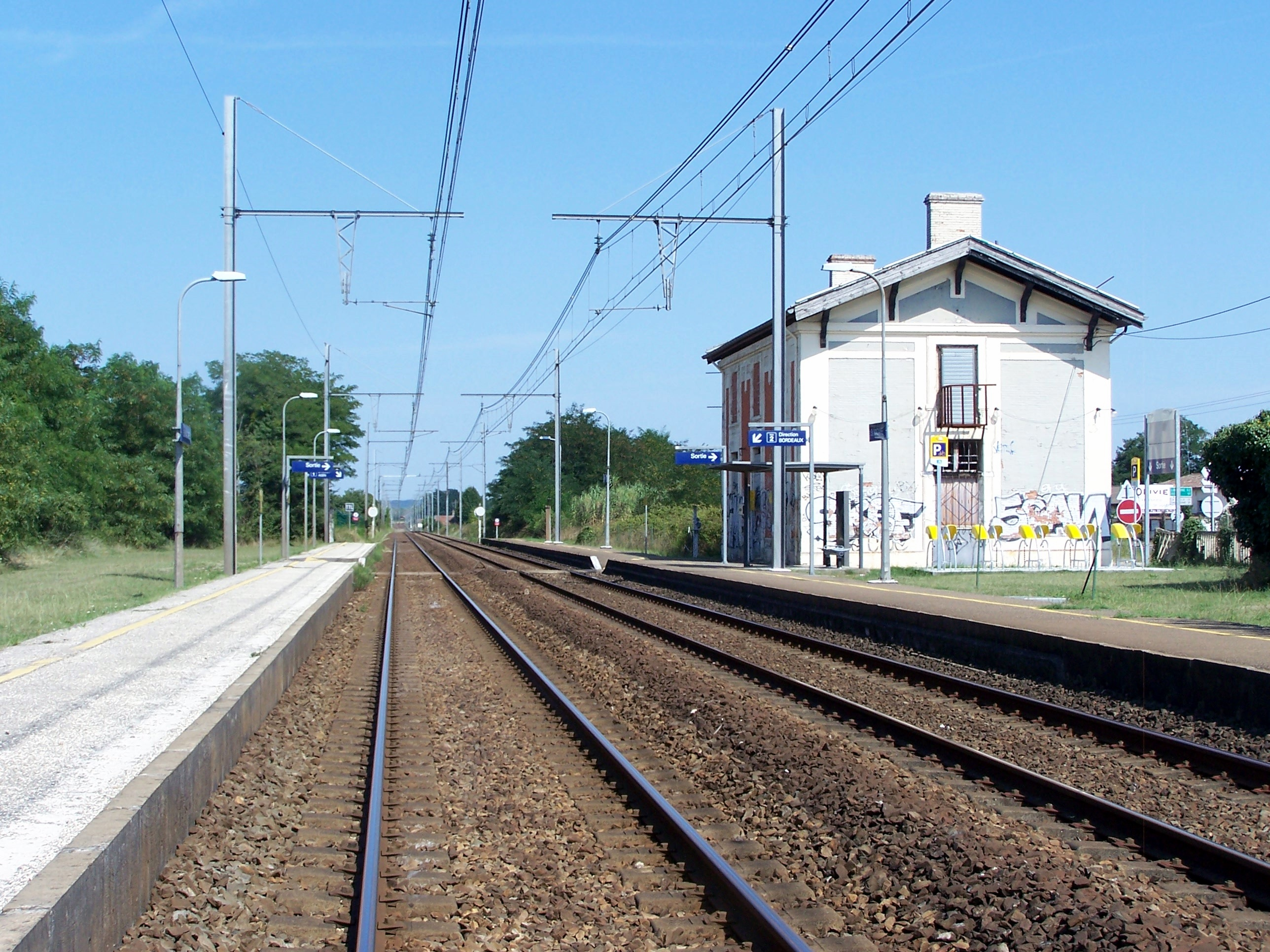
Saint-Macaire station

Saint-Macaire is a railway station in Saint-Macaire, Nouvelle-Aquitaine, France. The station is located on the Bordeaux–Sète railway line. The station is served by TER (local) services operated by SNCF.

== Train services ==
The following services currently call at Saint-Macaire:

- local service (TER Nouvelle-Aquitaine) Bordeaux - Langon - Marmande - Agen

Preceding station	TER Nouvelle-Aquitaine	Following station
Langon towards Bordeaux	44	Saint-Pierre-d'Aurillac towards Agen
