= Lamothe-Landerron station =

Railway station in Lamothe-Landerron, France

Coordinates: 44°35′47″N 0°02′42″E

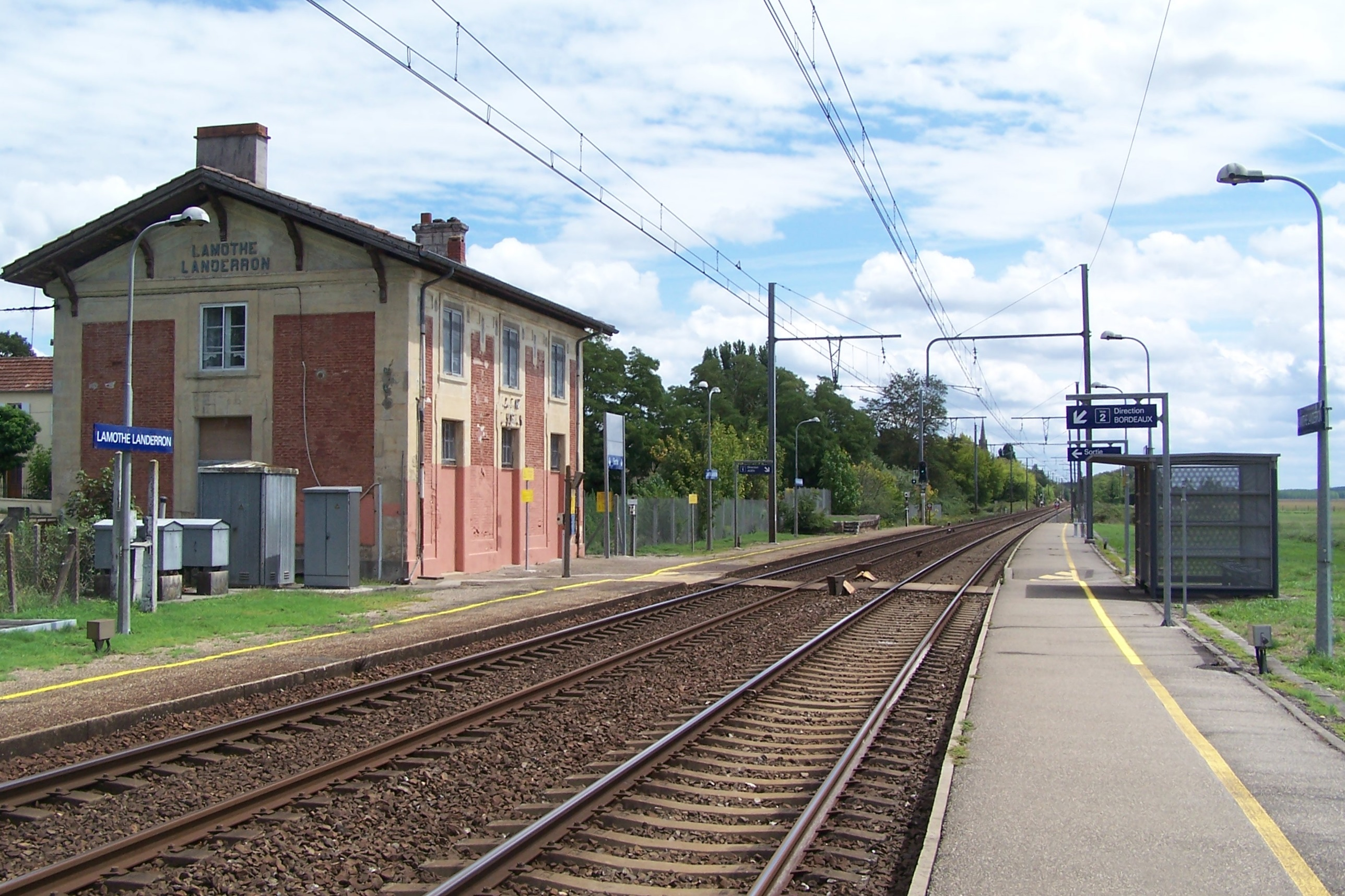
Lamothe-Landerron station

Lamothe-Landerron is a railway station in Lamothe-Landerron, Nouvelle-Aquitaine, France. The station is located on the Bordeaux–Sète railway line. The station is served by TER (local) services operated by SNCF.

== Train services ==
The following services currently call at Lamothe-Landerron:

- local service (TER Nouvelle-Aquitaine) Bordeaux - Langon - Marmande - Agen

Preceding station	TER Nouvelle-Aquitaine	Following station
La Réole towards Bordeaux	44	Sainte-Bazeille towards Agen
