= Tonneins station =

Railway station in Tonneins, France

Coordinates: 44°23′34″N 0°18′51″E

Tonneins
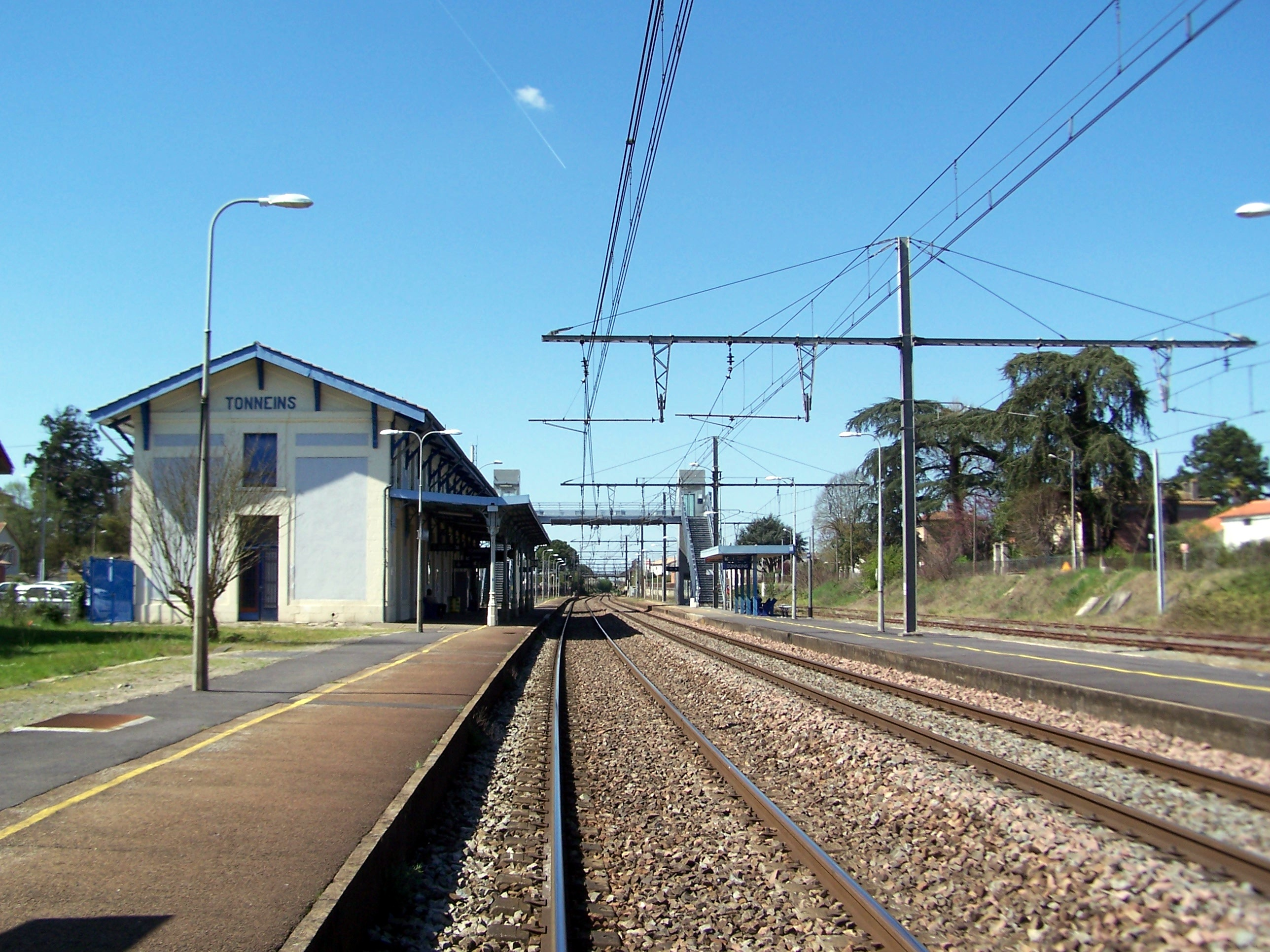
- Railway station

General information
- Location: Tonneins, Lot-et-Garonne, Nouvelle-Aquitaine; France
- Line: Bordeaux–Sète railway
- Platforms: 3
- Tracks: 5

Other information
- Station code: 87586651

Services
Preceding station	TER Nouvelle-Aquitaine	Following station
Marmande towards Bordeaux	44	Aiguillon towards Agen
Location

Tonneins is a railway station in Tonneins, Nouvelle-Aquitaine, France. The station is located on the Bordeaux–Sète railway. The station is served by TER (local) services operated by SNCF.

== Train services ==
The following services currently call at Tonneins:

- local service (TER Nouvelle-Aquitaine) Bordeaux - Langon - Marmande - Agen
