= La Réole station =

Railway station in La Réole, France

Coordinates: 44°34′48″N 0°01′52″W

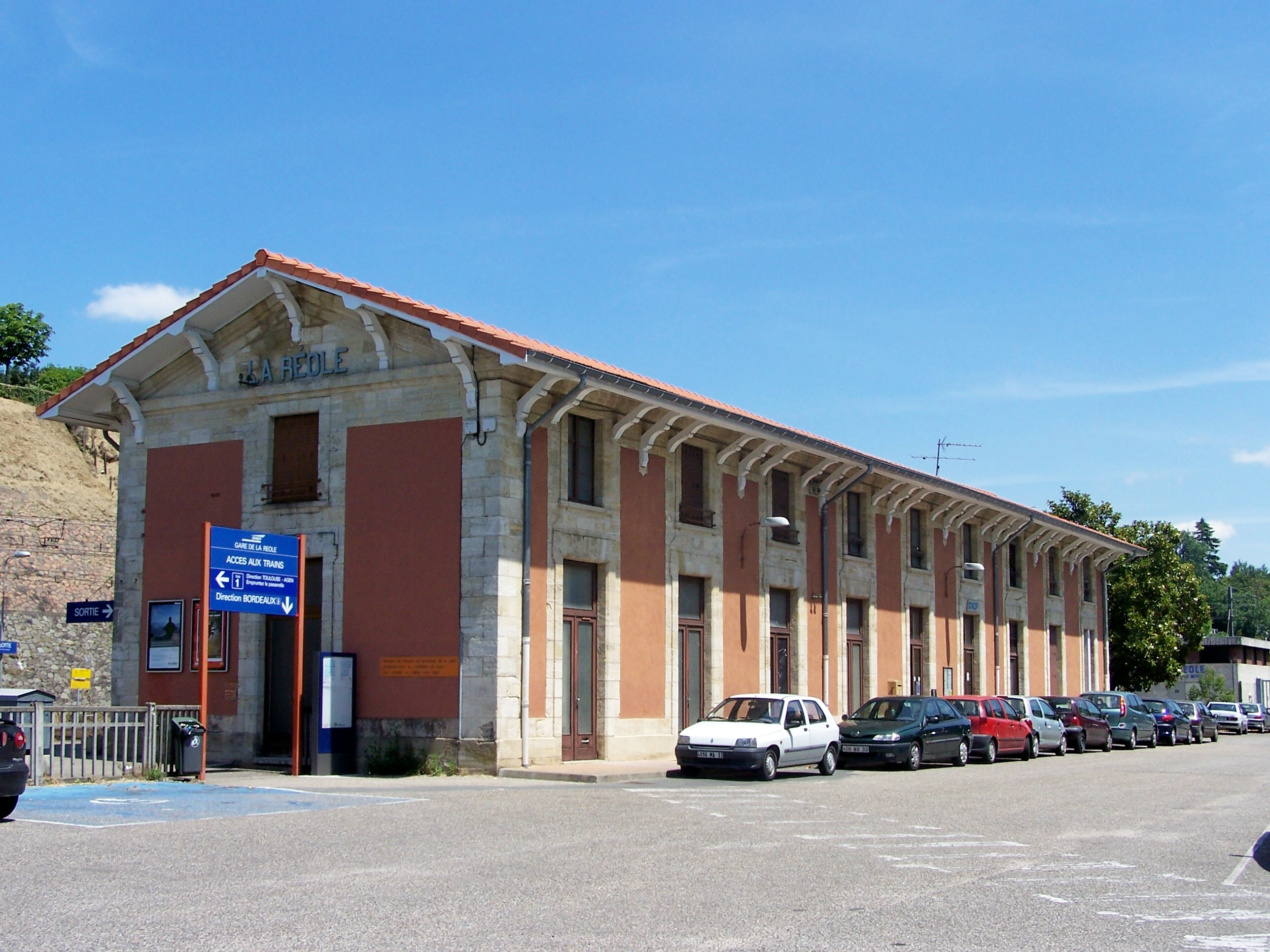
Gare de La Réole

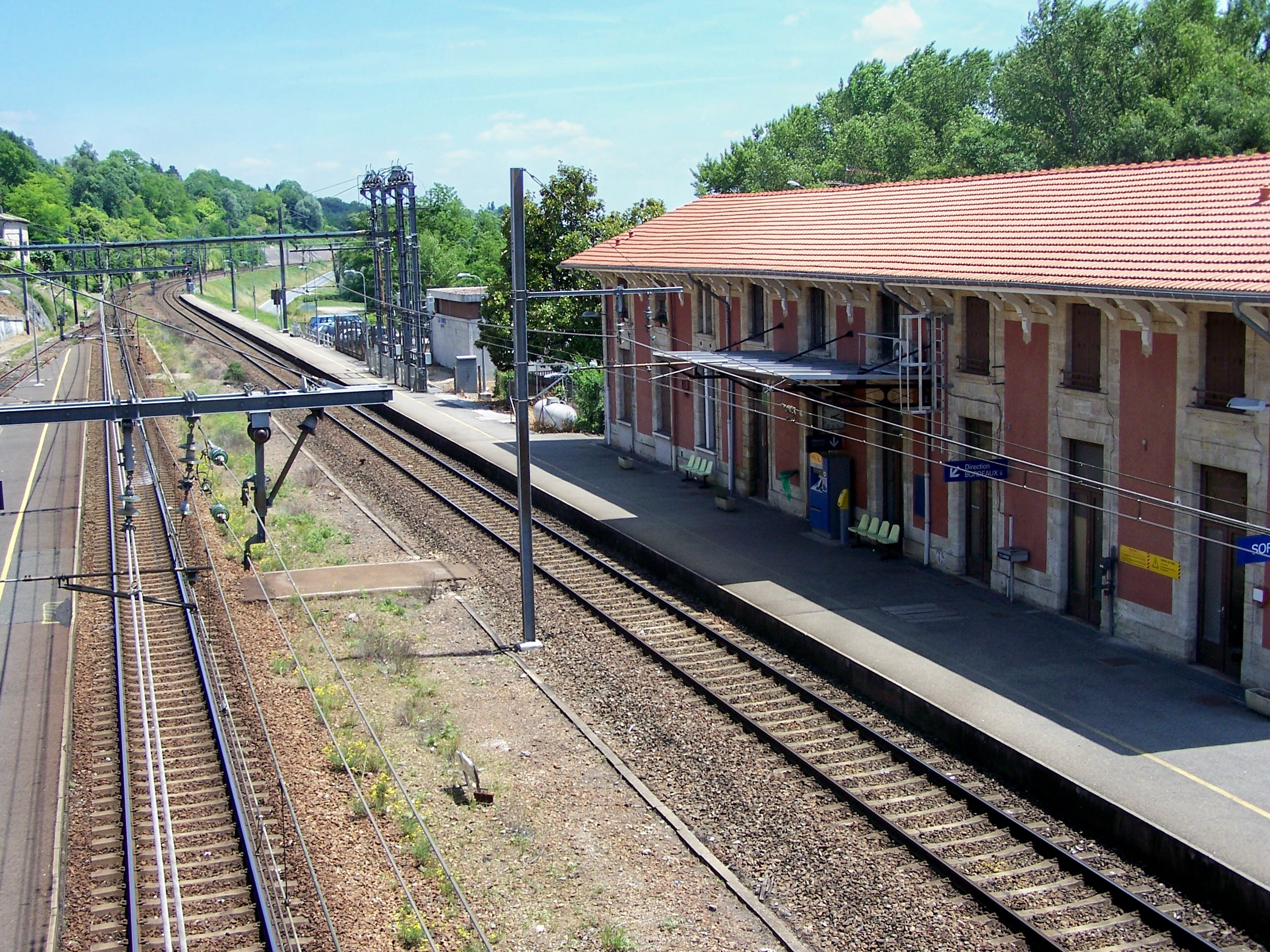
The station looking east towards Agen

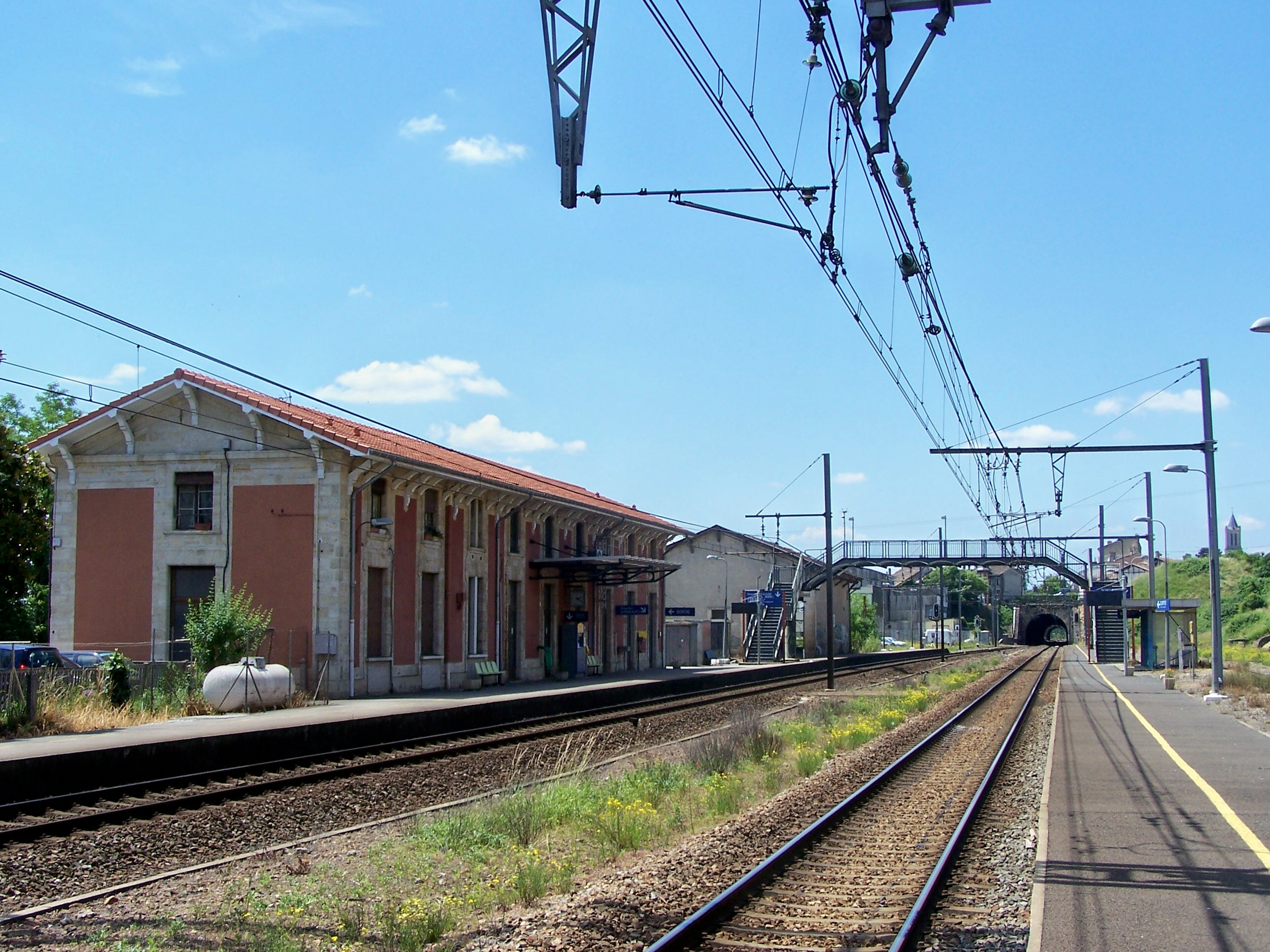
The station looking west towards Bordeaux

La Réole is a railway station in La Réole, Nouvelle-Aquitaine, France. The station is located on the Bordeaux–Sète railway line. The station is served by TER (local) services operated by SNCF.

== Train services ==
The following services currently call at La Réole:

- local service (TER Nouvelle-Aquitaine) Bordeaux - Langon - Marmande - Agen

Preceding station	TER Nouvelle-Aquitaine	Following station
Gironde towards Bordeaux	44	Lamothe-Landerron towards Agen
