= Aiguillon, Lot-et-Garonne =

Aiguillon
- Commune
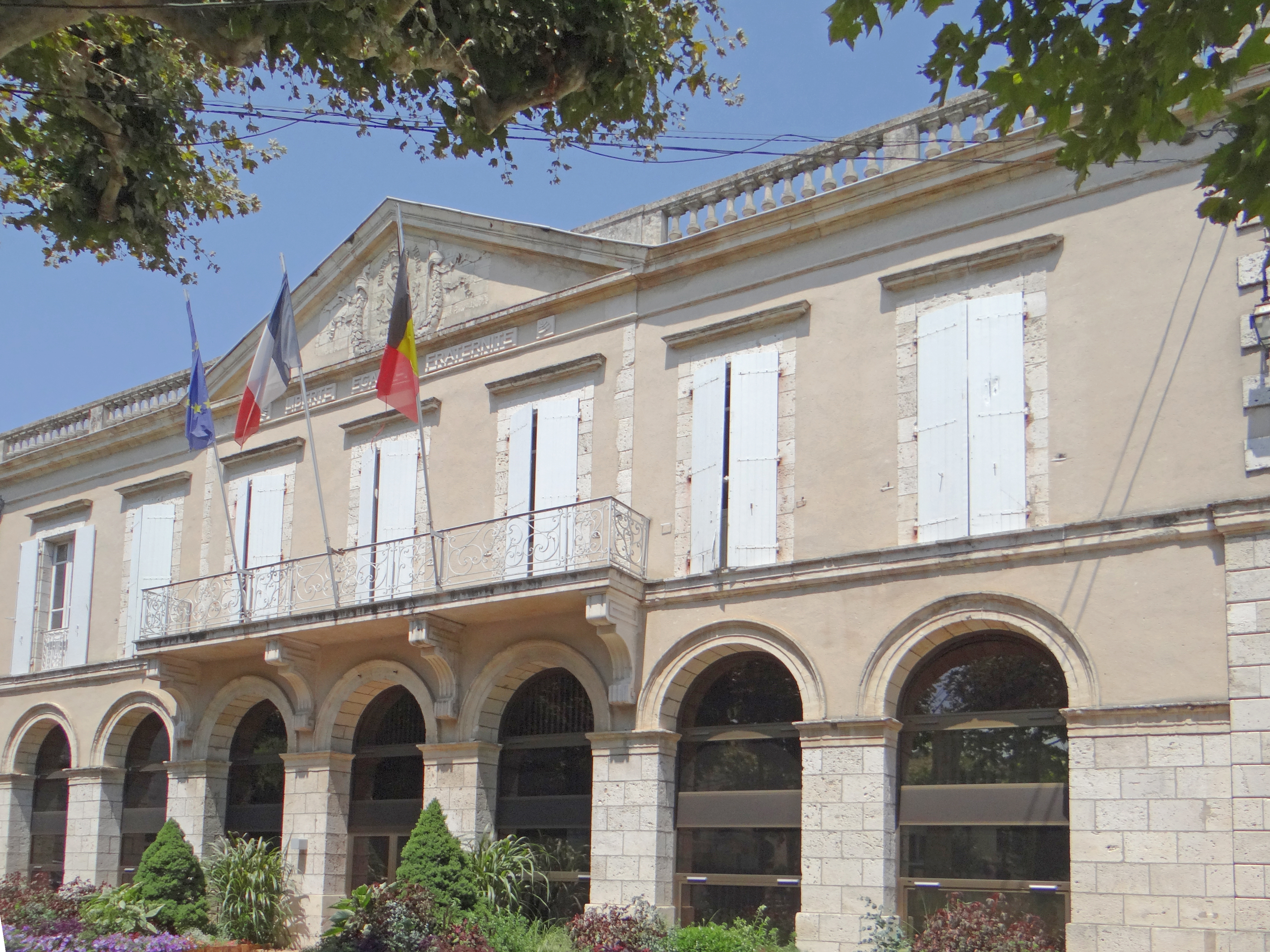
- The town hall in Aiguillon

- Coat of arms
- Location of Aiguillon
- Location within France Location within Nouvelle-Aquitaine
- Coordinates: 44°18′02″N 00°20′15″E
- Country: France
- Region: Nouvelle-Aquitaine
- Department: Lot-et-Garonne
- Arrondissement: Agen
- Canton: Le Confluent
- Intercommunality: Confluent et Coteaux de Prayssas

Government
  - Mayor (2026–32): Christian Girardi
- Area^{1}: 28.28 km^{2} (10.92 sq mi)
- Elevation: 41 m (135 ft)
- Highest elevation: 168 m (551 ft)
- Lowest elevation: 22 m (72 ft)
- Population (2023): 3,968
  - Density: 140.3/km^{2} (363.4/sq mi)
- Time zone: UTC+01:00 (CET)
  - Summer (DST): UTC+02:00 (CEST)
- INSEE/Postal code: 47004 /47190
- ^{1} French Land Register data, which excludes lakes, ponds, glaciers > 1 km^{2} (0.386 sq mi or 247 acres) and river estuaries.

Aiguillon (French pronunciation: [ɛɡɥijɔ̃]; Occitan: Gulhon) is a commune and bastide town of the Lot-et-Garonne department in southwestern France. It lies near the confluence of the rivers Lot and Garonne and not far from the confluence of the Baïse and the Garonne between Agen and Tonneins. Aiguillon station has rail connections to Agen, Langon and Bordeaux.

The organist and composer Marc de Ranse (1881–1951) was born in Aiguillon.

== History ==
Attached to the English crown in 1318, it was conquered by Du Guesclin in 1370. The future Jean II conducted a large-scale but unsuccessful siege of the town in 1346. In 1599 it was converted into a duchy of its own.

== Population ==
Historical population
Year	Pop.	±% p.a.
1968	3,754	—
1975	3,867	+0.42%
1982	4,121	+0.91%
1990	4,169	+0.14%
1999	4,219	+0.13%
2007	4,344	+0.37%
2012	4,314	−0.14%
2017	4,387	+0.34%
2023	3,968	−1.66%
Source: INSEE

== See also ==
- Communes of the Lot-et-Garonne department
- Duke of Aiguillon
