= Gironde station =

Railway station in France

Coordinates: 44°34′59″N 0°05′26″W

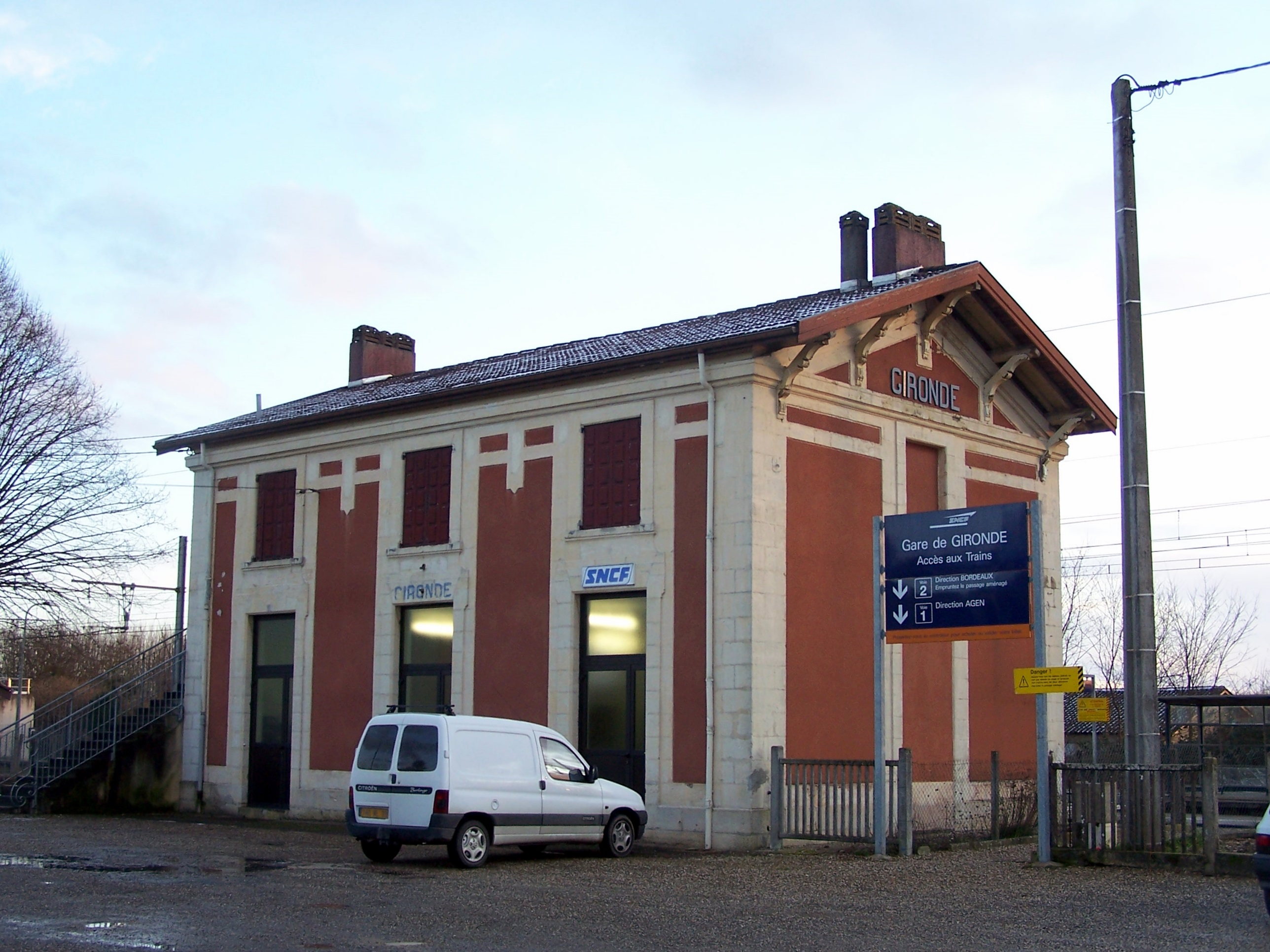
Gare de Gironde

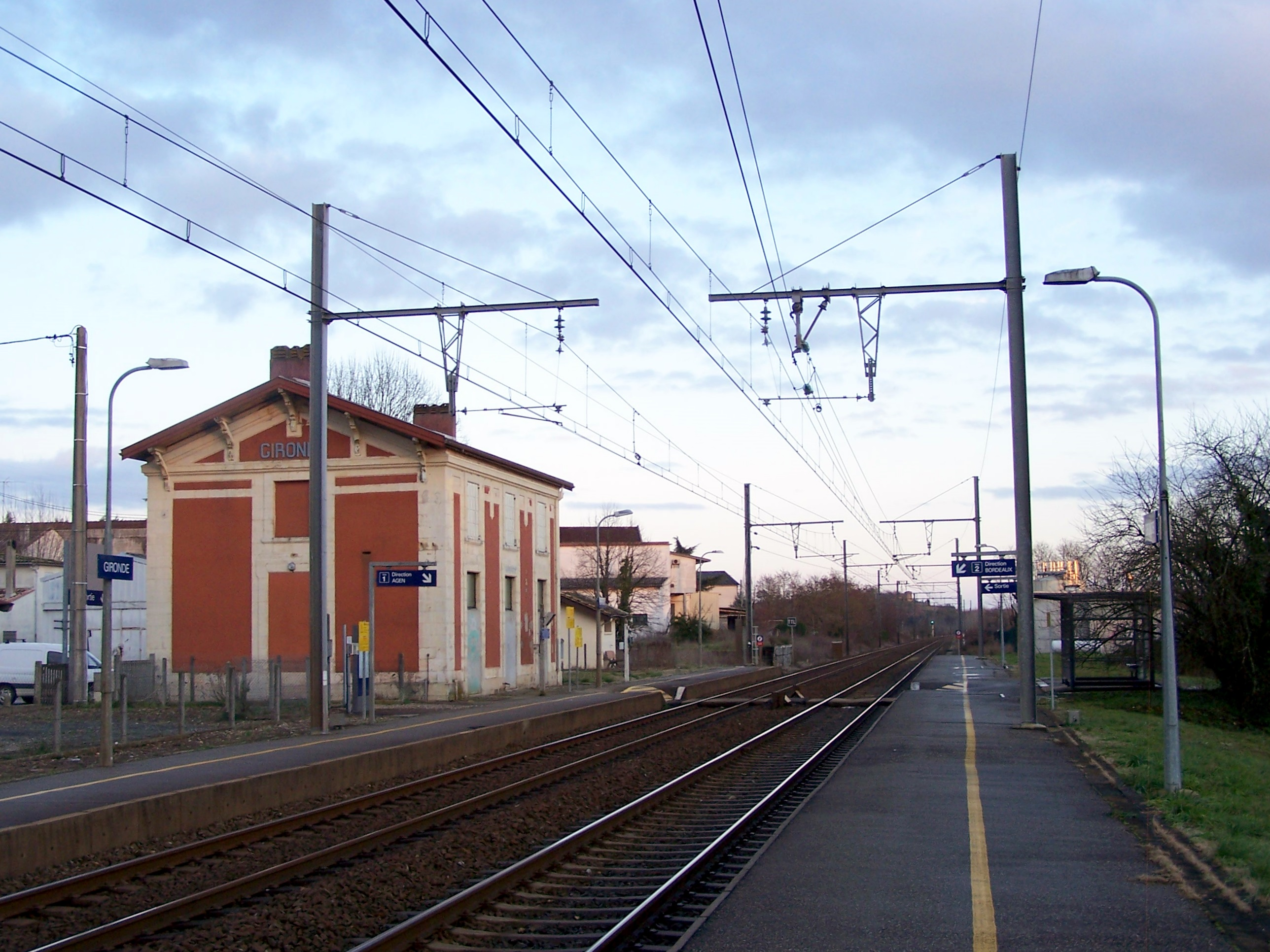
The station

Gironde is a railway station in Gironde-sur-Dropt, Nouvelle-Aquitaine, France. The station is located on the Bordeaux–Sète railway line. The station is served by TER (local) services operated by SNCF.

== Train services ==
The following services currently call at Gironde:

- local service (TER Nouvelle-Aquitaine) Bordeaux - Langon - Marmande - Agen

Preceding station	TER Nouvelle-Aquitaine	Following station
Caudrot towards Bordeaux	44	La Réole towards Agen
