= Caudrot station =

Railway station in Caudrot, France

Coordinates: 44°34′48″N 0°08′41″W

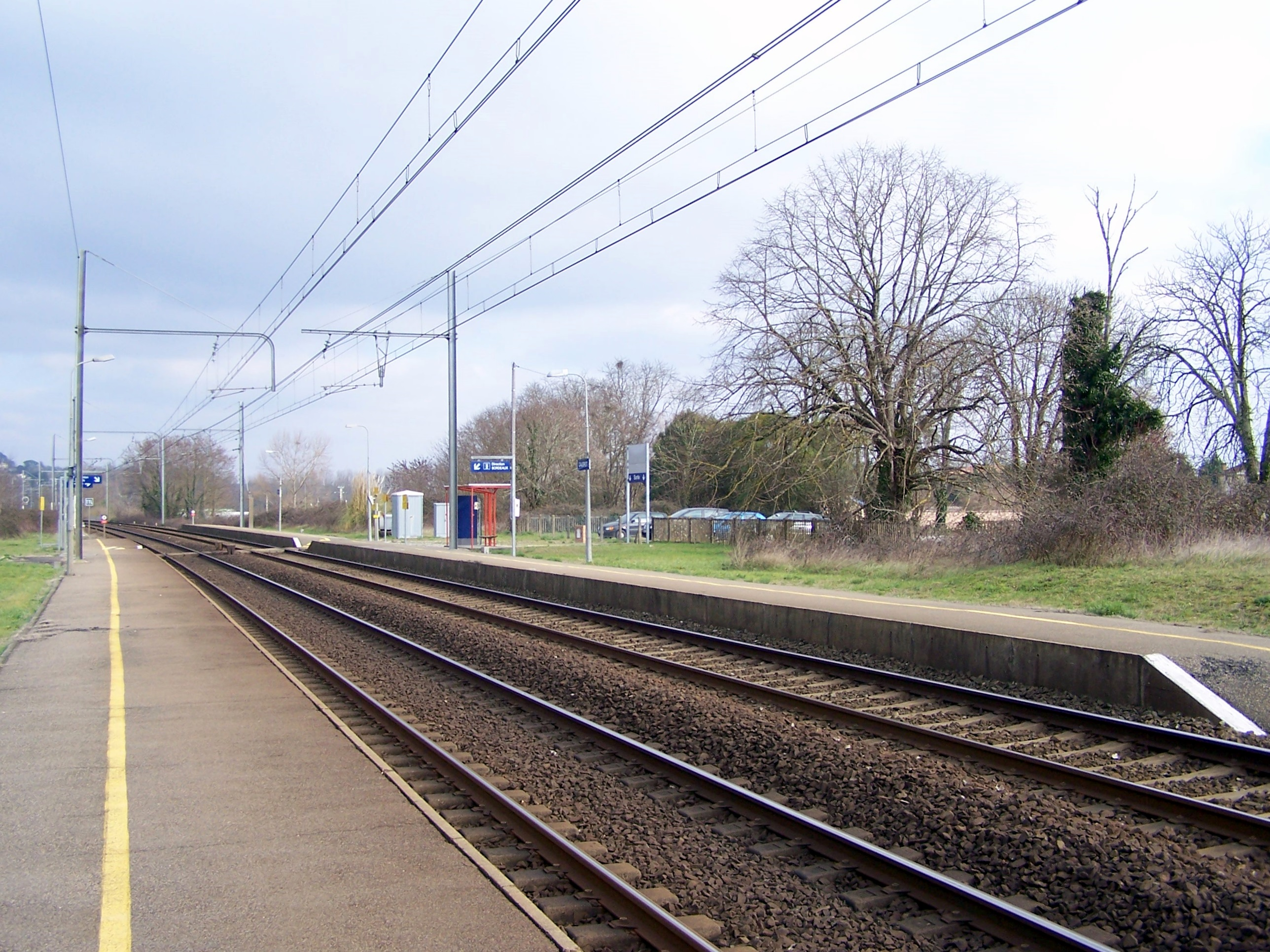
Gare de Caudrot

Caudrot is a railway station in Caudrot, Nouvelle-Aquitaine, France. The station is located on the Bordeaux–Sète railway line. The station is served by TER (local) services operated by SNCF.

== Train services ==
The following services currently call at Caudrot:

- local service (TER Nouvelle-Aquitaine) Bordeaux - Langon - Marmande - Agen

| Preceding station | TER Nouvelle-Aquitaine | Following station |
|---|---|---|
| Saint-Pierre-d'Aurillac towards Bordeaux | 44 | Gironde towards Agen |
