= Aiguillon station =

Railway station in Aiguillon, France

Coordinates: 44°17′54″N 0°20′08″E

Aiguillon
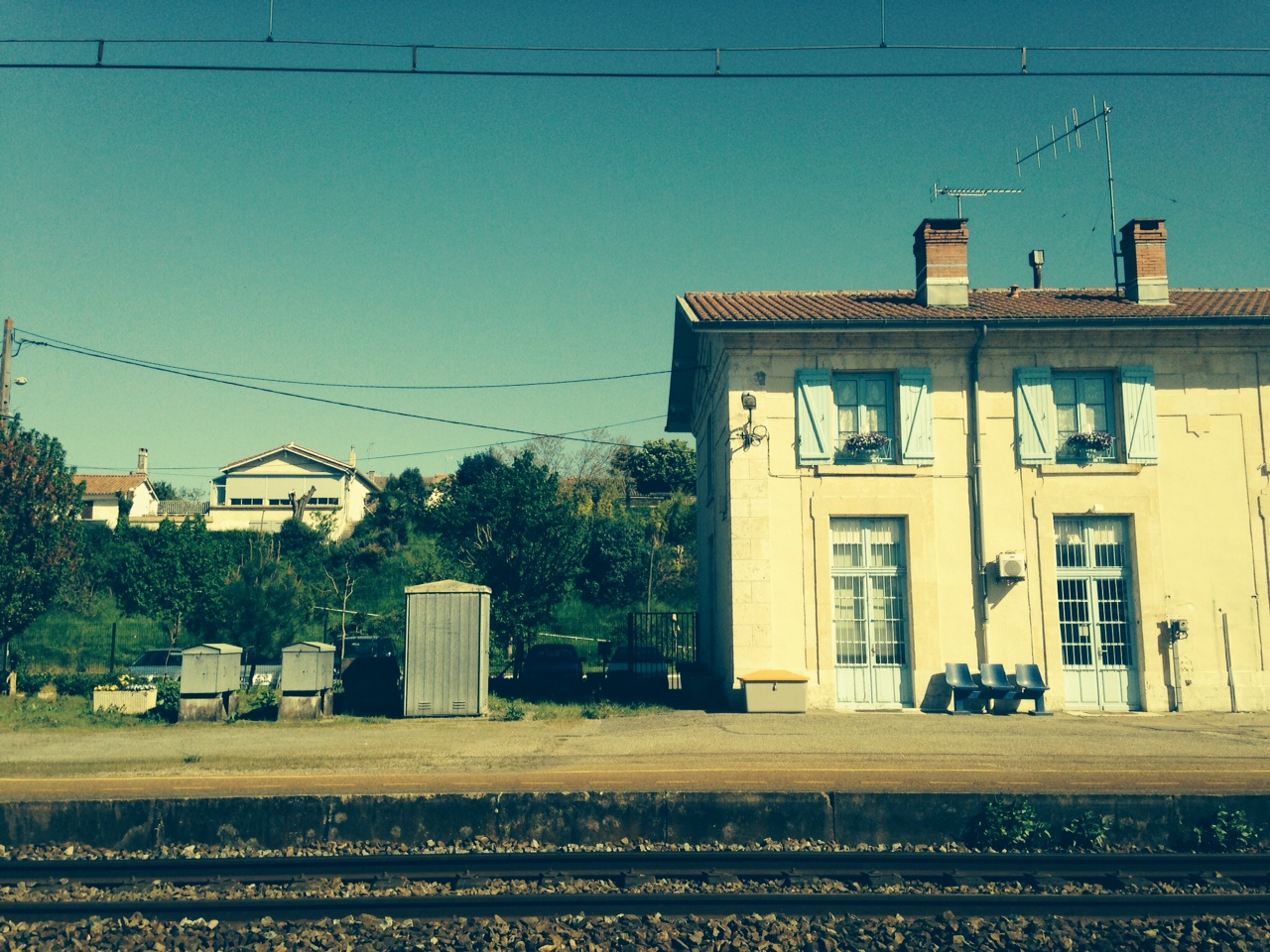

General information
- Location: Aiguillon, Lot-et-Garonne, Nouvelle-Aquitaine; France
- Line: Bordeaux–Sète railway
- Platforms: 2
- Tracks: 2

Other information
- Station code: 87586693

Services
Preceding station	TER Nouvelle-Aquitaine	Following station
Tonneins towards Bordeaux	44	Port-Sainte-Marie towards Agen
Location

Aiguillon is a railway station in Aiguillon, Nouvelle-Aquitaine, France. The station is located on the Bordeaux–Sète railway. The station is served by TER (local) services operated by SNCF.

== Train services ==
The following services currently call at Aiguillon:

- local service (TER Aquitaine) Bordeaux - Langon - Marmande - Agen
