= Saint-Pierre-d'Aurillac station =

Railway station in Saint-Pierre-d'Aurillac, France

Coordinates: 44°34′31″N 0°11′15″W

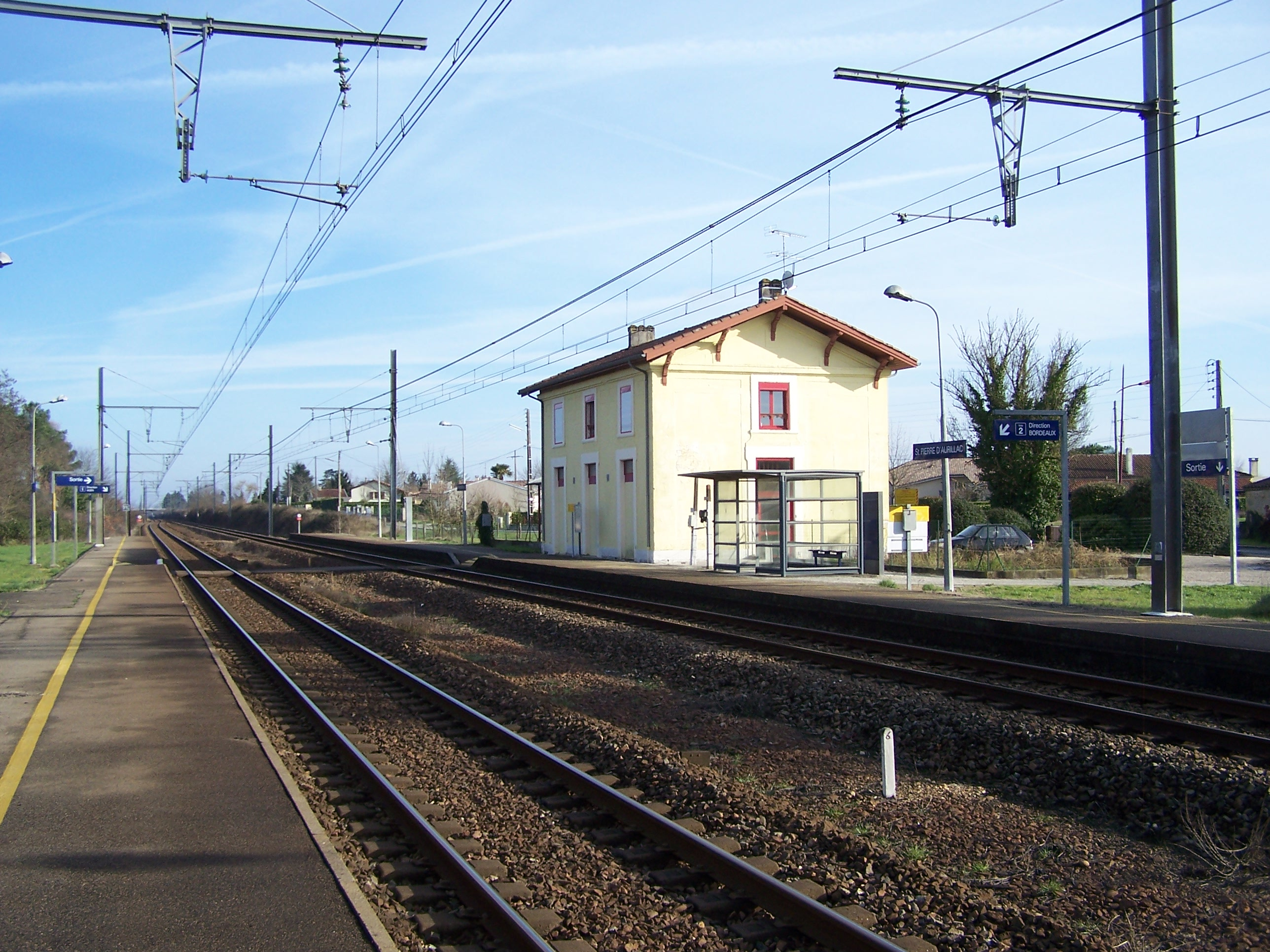
Gare de Saint-Pierre-d'Aurillac

Saint-Pierre-d'Aurillac is a railway station in Saint-Pierre-d'Aurillac, Nouvelle-Aquitaine, France. The station is located on the Bordeaux–Sète railway line. The station is served by TER (local) services operated by SNCF.

== Train services ==
The following services currently call at Saint-Pierre-d'Aurillac:

- local service (TER Nouvelle-Aquitaine) Bordeaux - Langon - Marmande - Agen

Preceding station	TER Nouvelle-Aquitaine	Following station
Saint-Macaire towards Bordeaux	44	Caudrot towards Agen
