= Sainte-Bazeille station =

Railway station in Sainte-Bazeille, France

Coordinates: 44°31′58″N 0°05′35″E

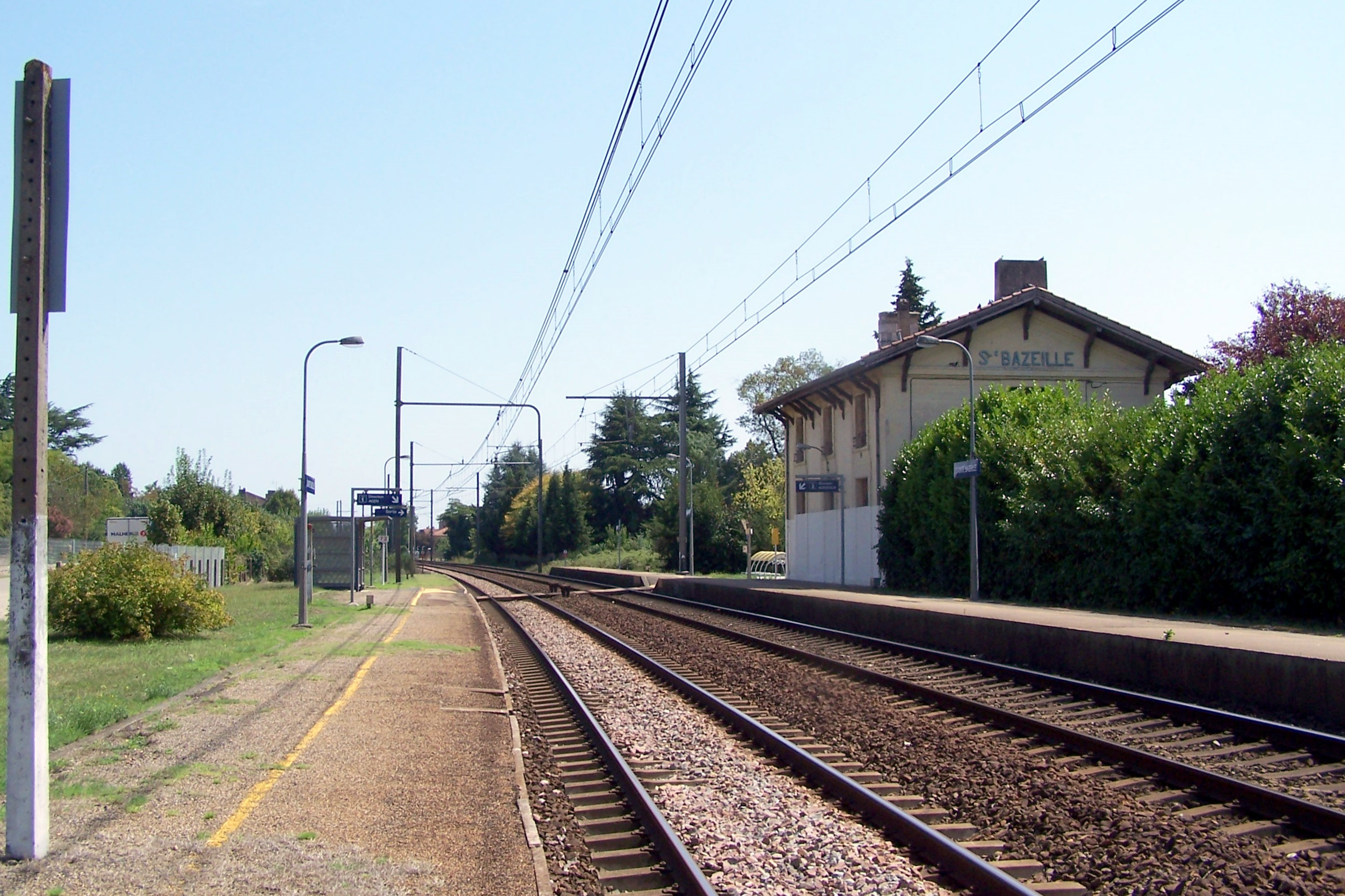
Sainte-Bazeille station

Sainte-Bazeille is a railway station in Sainte-Bazeille, Nouvelle-Aquitaine, France. The station is located on the Bordeaux–Sète railway line. The station is served by TER (local) services operated by SNCF.

== Train services ==
The following services currently call at Sainte-Bazeille:

- local service (TER Nouvelle-Aquitaine) Bordeaux - Langon - Marmande - Agen

Preceding station	TER Nouvelle-Aquitaine	Following station
Lamothe-Landerron towards Bordeaux	44	Marmande towards Agen
