= Jean-Pierre de Vincenzi =

French basketball coach

Jean-Pierre De Vincenzi, born on March 27, 1957, in Marmande, France. Is a former French basketball player, coach, and administrator, who has held the positions of National Technical Director (DTN) and General Director of the French Basketball Federation, as well as General Director of the French National Institute of Sport, Expertise, and Performance . He was later appointed as Inspector General of Youth and Sports.

== Career ==
In 1992, Jean-Pierre De Vincenzi led the French junior basketball team to their first-ever European Championship victory. The key players on the team were Laurent Sciarra, Laurent Foirest, Olivier Saint-Jean, and Cyril Julian. In 1993, he was appointed General Manager of the French national team and coach of the France A' team. In September 1995, he succeeded Michel Gomez as head coach of the French national team. Under his leadership, the team came in the fourth-place at the 1999 European Championships, held in France, securing their qualification for the 2000 Summer Olympics in Sydney. The team went on to win the silver medal at the Olympics, losing to the United States in the final. After the Olympics, De Vincenzi decided to step down as head coach, with his assistant Alain Weisz taking over. During his tenure, the French team played a total of 81 games, with 50 wins and 31 losses. From 1997, he also held the position of National Technical Director (DTN) in addition to his coaching role.
