= Marmande station =

Railway station in Marmande, France

Coordinates: 44°30′11″N 0°10′04″E

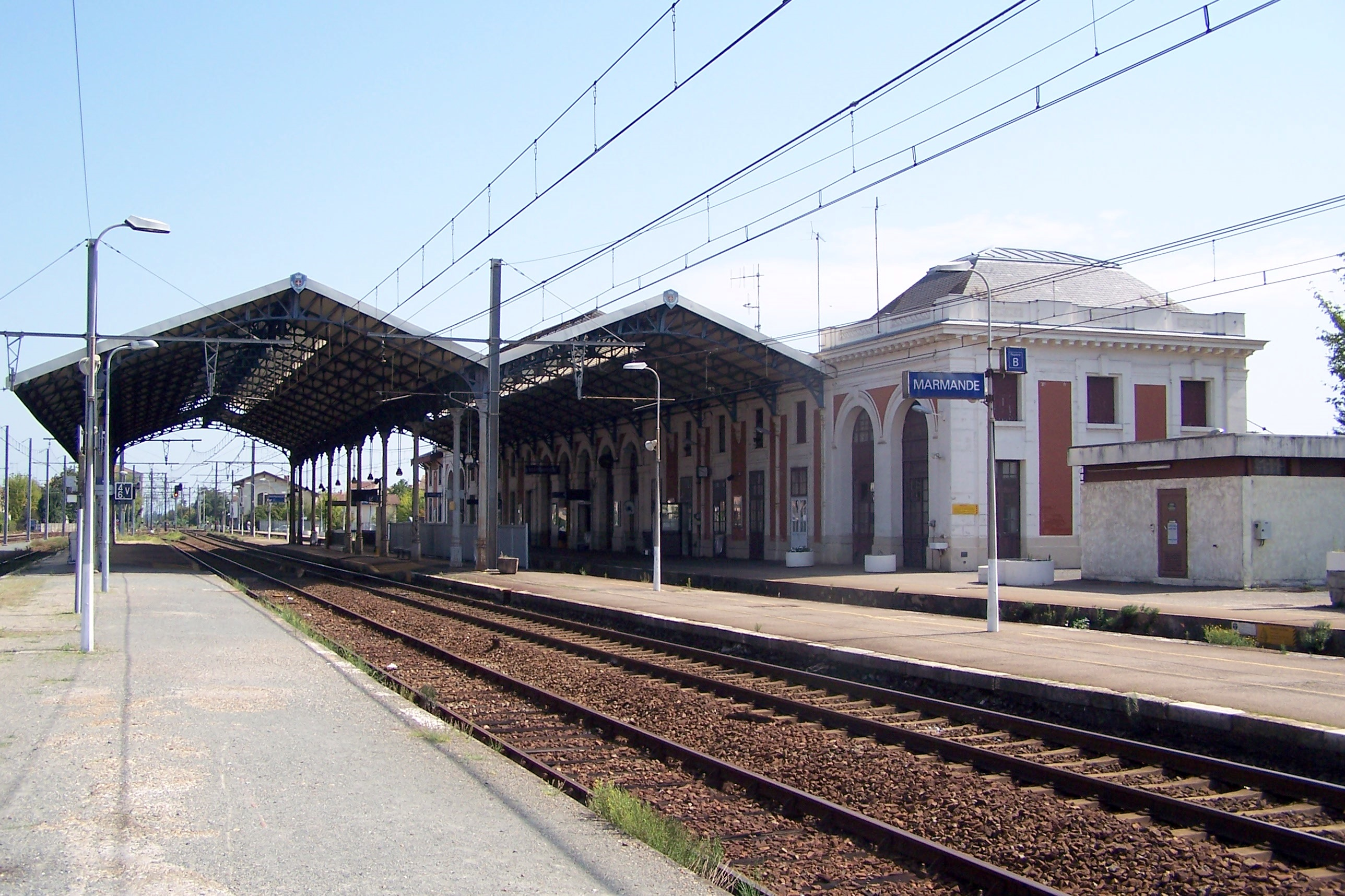
Marmande station

Marmande is a railway station in Marmande, Nouvelle-Aquitaine, France. The station is located on the Bordeaux–Sète railway and Marmande-Mont-de-Marsan railway lines. The station is served by Intercités (long distance, also night train) and TER (local) services operated by SNCF. The Mont-de-Marsan line only runs up to Casteljaloux; the section beyond Casteljaloux has been demolished.

== Train services ==
The following services currently call at Marmande:

- intercity services (Intercités) Bordeaux - Toulouse - Montpellier - Marseille
- local service (TER Nouvelle-Aquitaine) Bordeaux - Langon - Marmande - Agen

Preceding station	SNCF	Following station
Bordeaux Terminus	Intercités	Agen towards Marseille
Preceding station	TER Nouvelle-Aquitaine	Following station
Sainte-Bazeille towards Bordeaux	44	Tonneins towards Agen
