= Caudrot =

- Commune
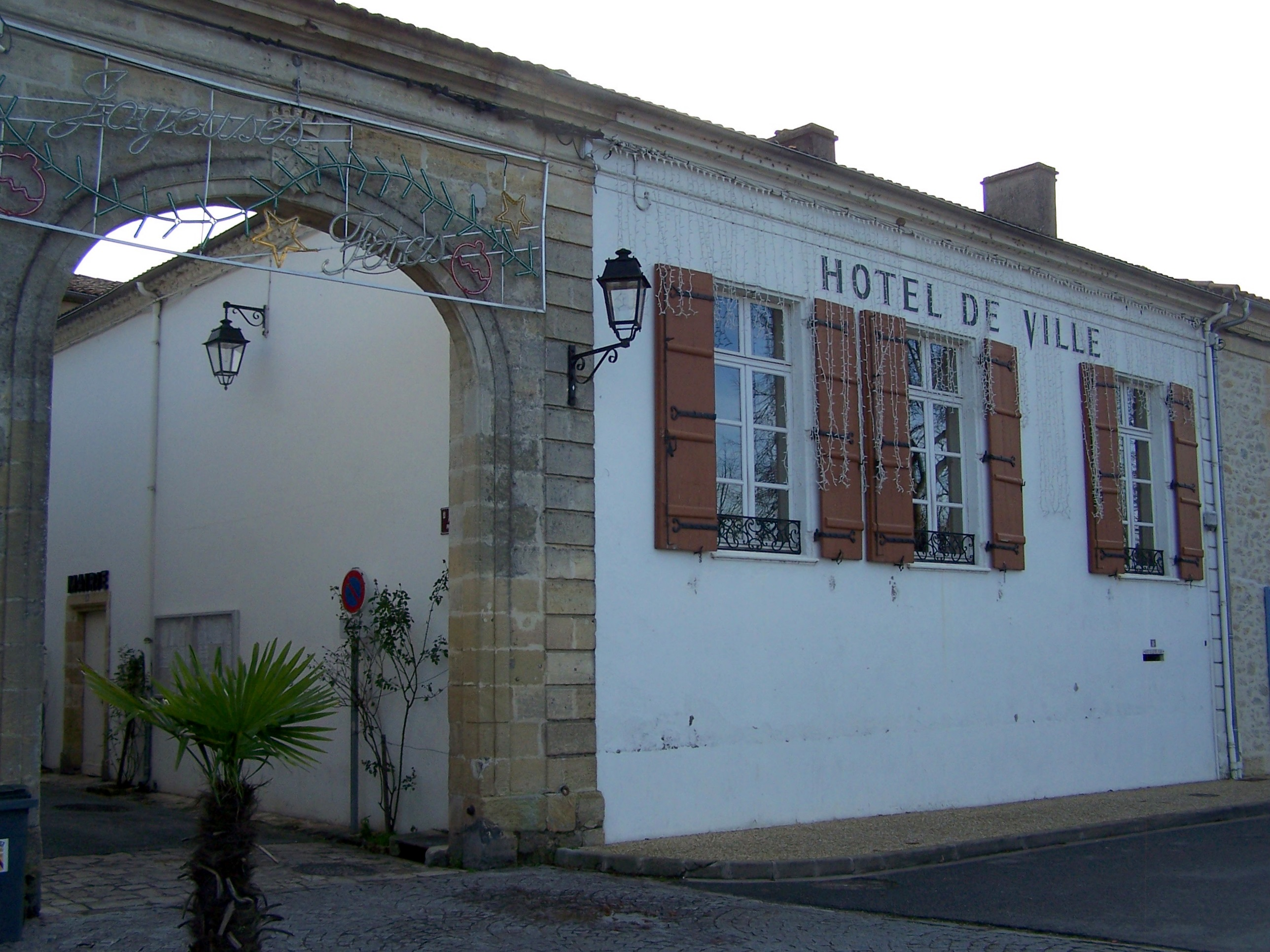
- Town hall

- Coat of arms
- Location of Caudrot
- Location within France Location within Nouvelle-Aquitaine
- Coordinates: 44°34′39″N 0°08′33″W
- Country: France
- Region: Nouvelle-Aquitaine
- Department: Gironde
- Arrondissement: Langon
- Canton: L'Entre-Deux-Mers

Government
  - Mayor (2020–2026): Jérémie Gaillard
- Area^{1}: 6.12 km^{2} (2.36 sq mi)
- Elevation: 10 m (33 ft)
- Highest elevation: 111 m (364 ft)
- Lowest elevation: 6 m (20 ft)
- Population (2023): 1,134
  - Density: 185/km^{2} (480/sq mi)
- Time zone: UTC+01:00 (CET)
  - Summer (DST): UTC+02:00 (CEST)
- INSEE/Postal code: 33111 /33490
- ^{1} French Land Register data, which excludes lakes, ponds, glaciers > 1 km^{2} (0.386 sq mi or 247 acres) and river estuaries.

Caudrot (French pronunciation: [kodʁo]; Occitan: Cauçdròt) is a commune in the Gironde department in Nouvelle-Aquitaine in southwestern France.

== Geography ==
The Dropt flows into the Garonne in Caudrot. Caudrot station has rail connections to Agen, Langon and Bordeaux.

== Population ==
Historical population
Year	Pop.	±% p.a.
1968	814	—
1975	809	−0.09%
1982	844	+0.61%
1990	945	+1.42%
1999	933	−0.14%
2007	1,021	+1.13%
2012	1,157	+2.53%
2017	1,180	+0.39%
2023	1,134	−0.66%
Source: INSEE

== See also ==
- Communes of the Gironde department
