= Abel-Dominique Boyé =

French painter

Abel Boyé
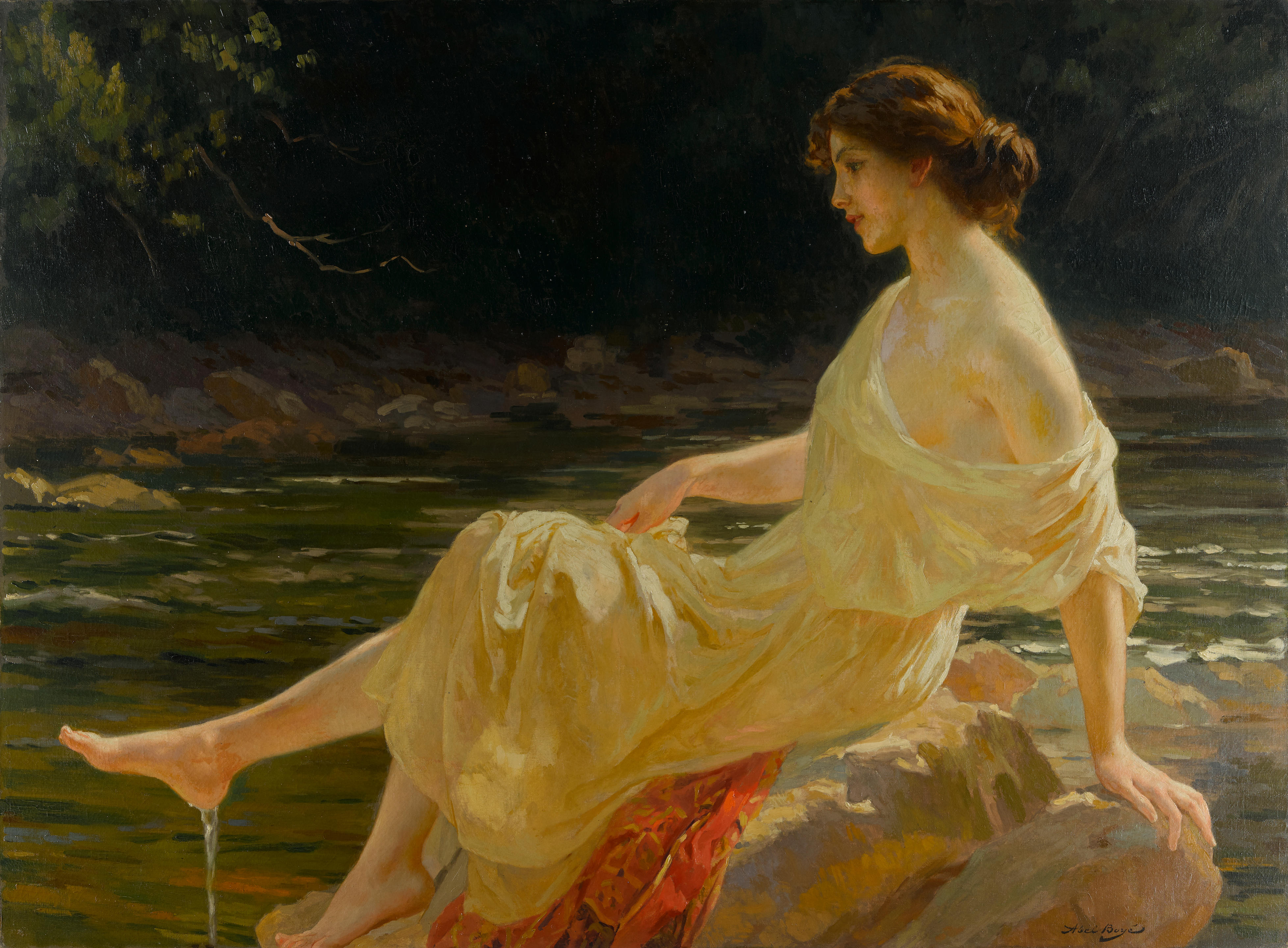
- Born: Abel-Dominique Boyé; 6 May 1864; Marmande, Lot-et-Garonne
- Died: 1934 (aged 69–70); Marmande, Lot-et-Garonne
- Known for: Painter

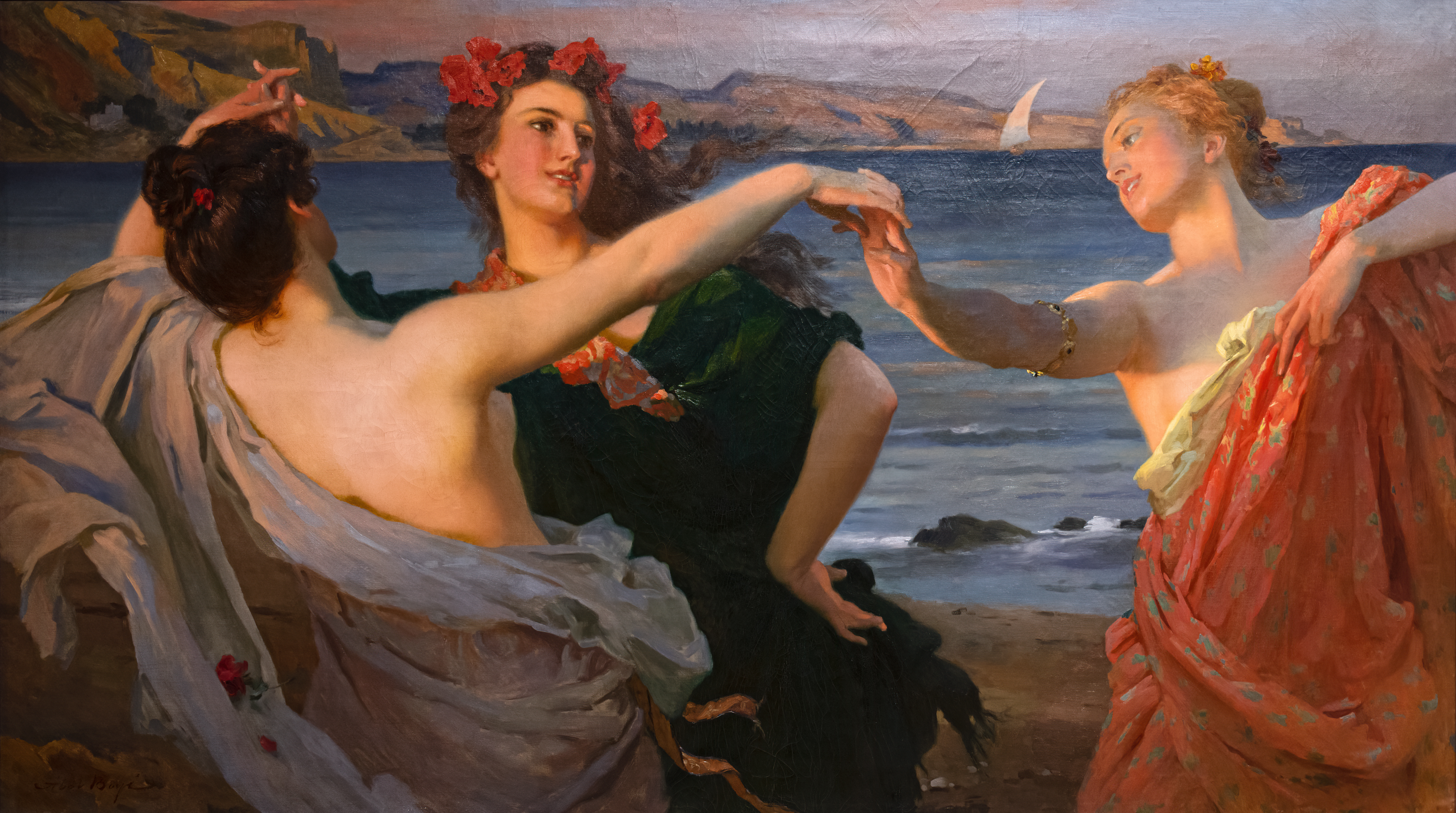
Joy (1899) Fine Arts Museum of Agen

Abel-Dominique Boyé (6 May 1864 – 1934) was a French painter. He was born in Marmande, France. He studied under Jean-Joseph Benjamin-Constant. In 1930, Boyé was awarded the Légion d'Honneur.
