= Port-Sainte-Marie =

- Commune
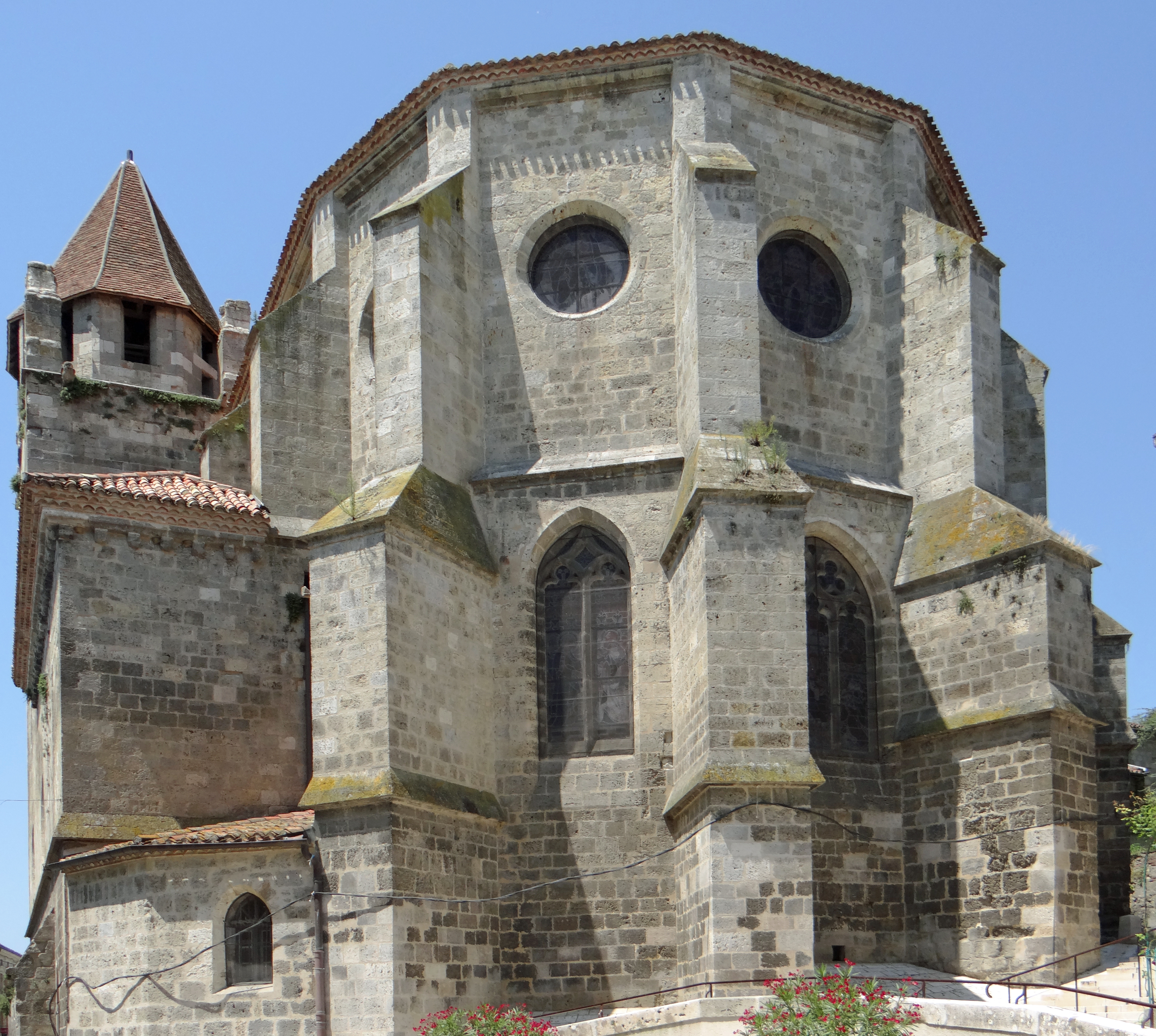
- The church of Notre-Dame, in Port-Sainte-Marie

- Coat of arms
- Location of Port-Sainte-Marie
- Location within France Location within Nouvelle-Aquitaine
- Coordinates: 44°15′06″N 0°23′53″E
- Country: France
- Region: Nouvelle-Aquitaine
- Department: Lot-et-Garonne
- Arrondissement: Agen
- Canton: Le Confluent
- Intercommunality: Confluent et Coteaux de Prayssas

Government
  - Mayor (2020–2026): Jacques Larroy
- Area^{1}: 18.94 km^{2} (7.31 sq mi)
- Elevation: 41 m (135 ft)
- Highest elevation: 216 m (709 ft)
- Lowest elevation: 27 m (89 ft)
- Population (2023): 1,887
  - Density: 99.63/km^{2} (258.0/sq mi)
- Time zone: UTC+01:00 (CET)
  - Summer (DST): UTC+02:00 (CEST)
- INSEE/Postal code: 47210 /47130
- ^{1} French Land Register data, which excludes lakes, ponds, glaciers > 1 km^{2} (0.386 sq mi or 247 acres) and river estuaries.

Port-Sainte-Marie (French pronunciation: [pɔʁ sɛ̃t maʁi]; Occitan: Lo Pòrt) is a commune in the Lot-et-Garonne department in south-western France. Port-Sainte-Marie station has rail connections to Agen, Langon and Bordeaux.

== See also ==
- Communes of the Lot-et-Garonne department
