= Montauban-Ville-Bourbon station =

Railway station in Montauban, France

Montauban Montauban-Ville-Bourbon
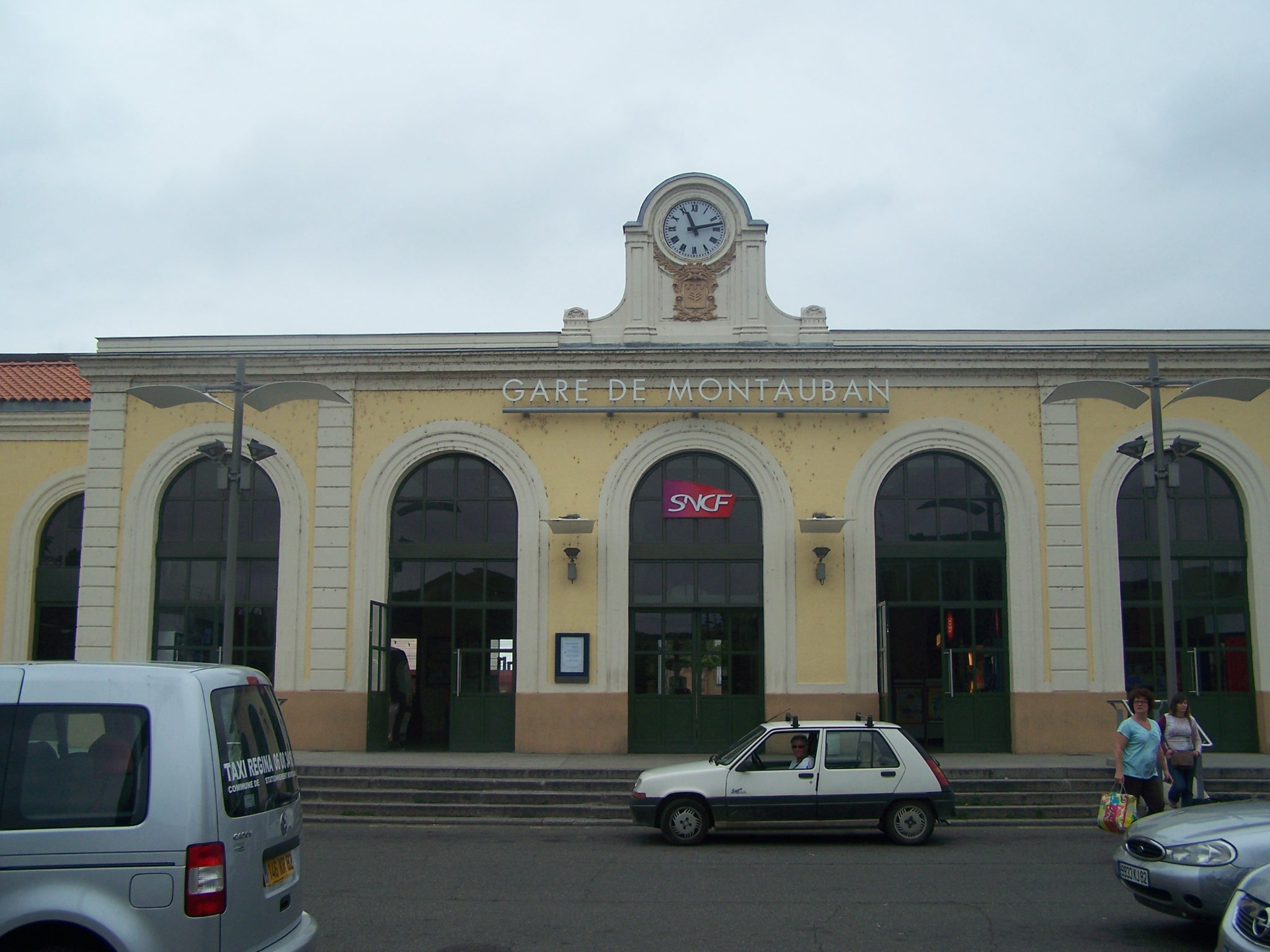
- Montauban railway station

General information
- Location: Montauban, Tarn-et-Garonne, Occitanie; France
- Coordinates: 44°0′50″N 1°20′27″E
- Owner: SNCF
- Lines: Bordeaux–Sète railway Orléans–Montauban railway
- Platforms: 5

Other information
- Station code: 87611244

History
- Opened: 1856
- Electrified: ?

Passengers
- 2024: 1,481,751
Services
Preceding station	SNCF	Following station
Agen towards Montparnasse	TGV inOui	Toulouse Terminus
Agen towards Bordeaux	Intercités	Toulouse towards Marseille
Caussade towards Paris-Austerlitz	Intercités	Toulouse Terminus
Caussade towards Paris-Austerlitz	Intercités (night)	Toulouse Terminus
Preceding station	Ouigo	Following station
Agen towards Paris-Montparnasse	Grande Vitesse	Toulouse Terminus
Preceding station	TER Occitanie	Following station
La Ville-Dieu towards Agen	18	Castelnau-d'Estrétefonds towards Toulouse
Albias towards Brive-la-Gaillarde	19	Montbartier towards Toulouse
Location

Montauban or Montauban-Ville-Bourbon is a railway station serving the town of Montauban, Tarn-et-Garonne department, southwestern France.

== The station ==
The station lies on the Bordeaux–Sète railway and it is the southern terminus of the Orléans–Montauban railway. The Bordeaux–Sète railway opened through Montauban in 1856 and it is thought this is when the station opened. The line from Paris via Orléans opened on 4 October 1884.

The name Montauban-Ville-Bourbon is used to distinguish it from the now closed station of Montauban-Ville-Nouvelle.

The station is served by TGV (high speed), Intercités (long distance, also night train) and TER (local) services operated by SNCF.

== Train services ==
The following services currently call at Montauban-Ville-Bourbon:

- high speed services (TGV inOui and Ouigo) Paris-Bordeaux–Toulouse
- intercity services (Intercités) Paris–Vierzon–Limoges–Toulouse
- intercity services (Intercités) Bordeaux–Toulouse–Montpellier–Marseille
- night services (Intercités de nuit) Paris–Orléans–Souillac–Toulouse
- local service (TER Occitanie) Brive-la-Gaillarde–Cahors–Montauban–Toulouse
- local service (TER Occitanie) Montauban–Toulouse
- local service (TER Occitanie) Agen–Montauban–Toulouse
