= Tonneins =

- Commune
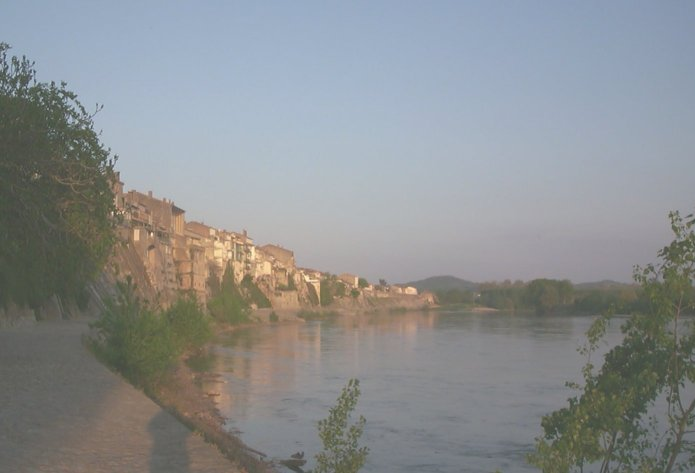
- The Garonne river at Tonneins

- Coat of arms
- Location of Tonneins
- Location within France Location within Nouvelle-Aquitaine
- Coordinates: 44°23′26″N 0°18′33″E
- Country: France
- Region: Nouvelle-Aquitaine
- Department: Lot-et-Garonne
- Arrondissement: Marmande
- Canton: Tonneins
- Intercommunality: Val de Garonne Agglomération

Government
  - Mayor (2020–2026): Dante Rinaudo
- Area^{1}: 34.78 km^{2} (13.43 sq mi)
- Elevation: 39 m (128 ft)
- Highest elevation: 166 m (545 ft)
- Lowest elevation: 21 m (69 ft)
- Population (2023): 9,459
  - Density: 272.0/km^{2} (704.4/sq mi)
- Time zone: UTC+01:00 (CET)
  - Summer (DST): UTC+02:00 (CEST)
- INSEE/Postal code: 47310 /47400
- ^{1} French Land Register data, which excludes lakes, ponds, glaciers > 1 km^{2} (0.386 sq mi or 247 acres) and river estuaries.

Tonneins (French pronunciation: [tɔnɛ̃s]; Occitan: Tonens) is a town in the Lot-et-Garonne department of south-western France. It stands above the river Garonne, between Marmande to the west and Agen to the east, and is the first major town below the confluence of the Lot and Garonne Rivers after which the department is named. Tonneins station has rail connections to Agen, Langon and Bordeaux.

Until the early 2000s, it was the tobacco capital of France. It is known for its quays alongside which the tobacco barges were previously moored. When the tobacco factory closed down in 2004 and production moved to Spain, the town was badly affected economically with the loss of more than 500 jobs. The surrounding countryside still contains many wooden sheds, known locally as 'sechoirs', formerly used to dry the tobacco leaves. The commune of Tonneins is largely agricultural, the principal crops now being maize, rapeseed and sunflowers.

== Population ==
Historical population
| Year | Pop. | ±% p.a. |
|---|---|---|
| 1968 | 8,417 | — |
| 1975 | 9,127 | +1.16% |
| 1982 | 9,141 | +0.02% |
| 1990 | 9,334 | +0.26% |
| 1999 | 9,041 | −0.35% |
| 2007 | 9,127 | +0.12% |
| 2012 | 8,888 | −0.53% |
| 2017 | 9,069 | +0.40% |
| 2023 | 9,459 | +0.70% |
Source: INSEE

== See also ==
- Communes of the Lot-et-Garonne department

== Twin towns ==
- Thann, France, since 27 June 1997
- Zoppola, Italy, since 8 August 1982
