= Agen–Vic-en-Bigorre railway =

Railway line in France

Bon-Encontre-Vic-en-Bigorre railway Agen - Auch railway
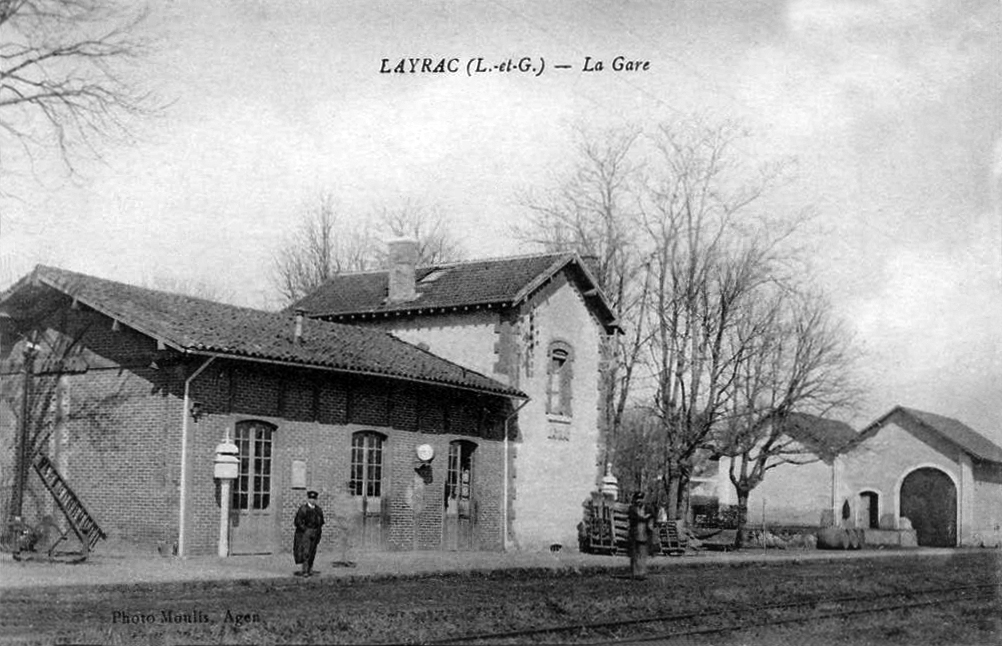
- Gare-Layrac-1900

Overview
- Status: Operational (Agen - Auch); Closed (Auch - Vic-en-Bigorre)
- Owner: RFF
- Locale: France (Nouvelle-Aquitaine, Occitanie)
- Termini: Agen station; Vic-en-Bigorre station
- Stations: 22

Service
- System: SNCF
- Operator(s): SNCF

Technical
- Line length: 124 km (77 mi) (approximate)
- Number of tracks: Single track
- Track gauge: 1,435 mm (4 ft 8 1/2 in) standard gauge
- Electrification: not electrified

The Agen-Vic-en-Bigorre railway is a French railway line, that connected the rural areas between Agen, Auch and Tarbes.

The line is now closed between Auch and Vic-en-Bigorre and remains open to freight trains between Agen and Auch.

== Services ==
- Up to 60 freight trains per year, carrying grain, operate along the line.
