= Gironde-sur-Dropt =

- Commune
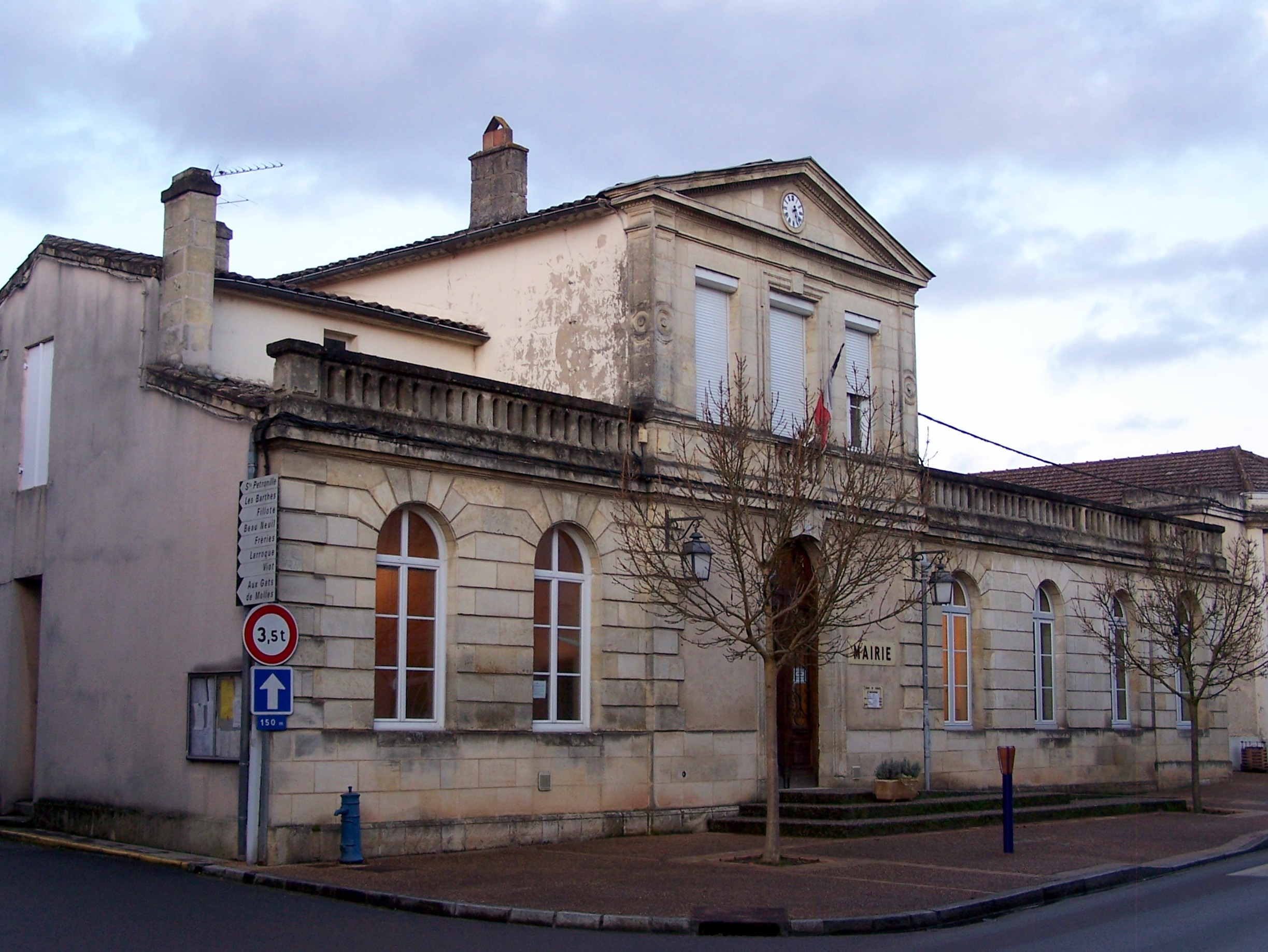
- Town hall
- Location of Gironde-sur-Dropt
- Location within France Location within Nouvelle-Aquitaine
- Coordinates: 44°35′04″N 0°05′18″W
- Country: France
- Region: Nouvelle-Aquitaine
- Department: Gironde
- Arrondissement: Langon
- Canton: Le Réolais et Les Bastides
- Intercommunality: Réolais en Sud Gironde

Government
  - Mayor (2020–2026): Philippe Moutier
- Area^{1}: 8.84 km^{2} (3.41 sq mi)
- Elevation: 20 m (66 ft)
- Highest elevation: 93 m (305 ft)
- Lowest elevation: 8 m (26 ft)
- Population (2023): 1,333
  - Density: 151/km^{2} (391/sq mi)
- Time zone: UTC+01:00 (CET)
  - Summer (DST): UTC+02:00 (CEST)
- INSEE/Postal code: 33187 /33190
- ^{1} French Land Register data, which excludes lakes, ponds, glaciers > 1 km^{2} (0.386 sq mi or 247 acres) and river estuaries.

Gironde-sur-Dropt (French pronunciation: [ʒiʁɔ̃d syʁ dʁo], literally Gironde on Dropt; Occitan: Gironda sau Dròt) is a commune in the Gironde department in southwestern France. Gironde station has rail connections to Agen, Langon and Bordeaux.

== Population ==
Historical population
Year	Pop.	±% p.a.
1968	1,103	—
1975	1,133	+0.38%
1982	1,072	−0.79%
1990	1,091	+0.22%
1999	1,105	+0.14%
2007	1,116	+0.12%
2012	1,166	+0.88%
2017	1,261	+1.58%
2023	1,333	+0.93%
Source: INSEE

== See also ==
- Communes of the Gironde department
