= Port-Sainte-Marie station =

Railway station in Port-Sainte-Marie, France

Coordinates: 44°15′00″N 0°23′26″E

Port-Sainte-Marie

General information
- Location: Port-Sainte-Marie, Lot-et-Garonne, Nouvelle-Aquitaine, France
- Line: Bordeaux–Sète railway
- Platforms: 3
- Tracks: 5

Other information
- Station code: 87586107

Services
Preceding station	TER Nouvelle-Aquitaine	Following station
Aiguillon towards Bordeaux	44	Agen Terminus
Location

Port-Sainte-Marie is a railway station in Port-Sainte-Marie, Nouvelle-Aquitaine, France. The station is located on the Bordeaux–Sète railway. The station is served by TER (local) services operated by SNCF.

== Train services ==
The following services currently call at Port-Sainte-Marie:

- local service (TER Nouvelle-Aquitaine) Bordeaux - Langon - Marmande - Agen
