= François Combefis =

French patrologist (1605–1679)

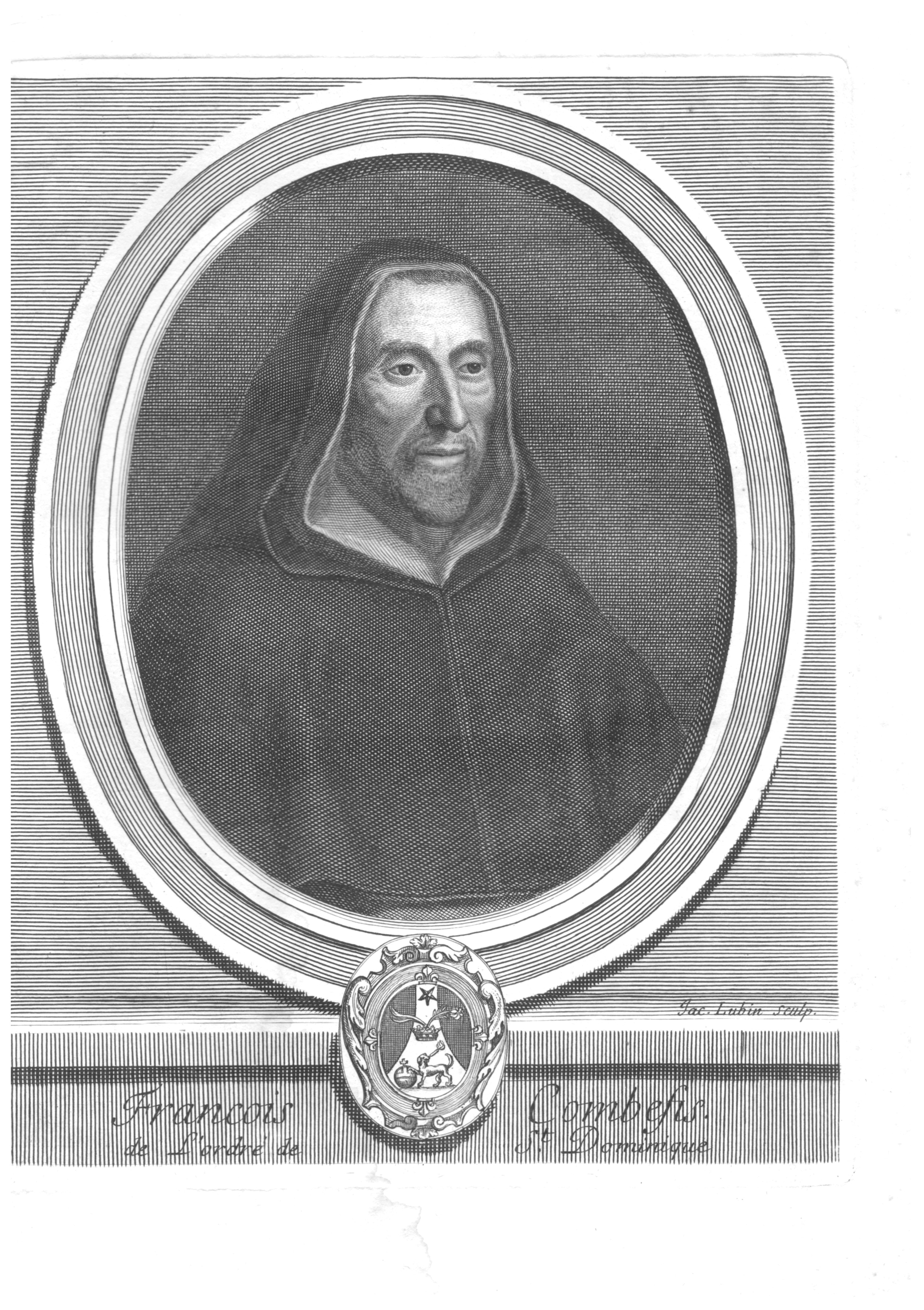
François Combefis

François Combefis (or Combefisius) O.P. (November 1605 – 23 March 1679) was a French Dominican patrologist. He published previously unedited works by John Chrysostom.

== Life ==
He was born at Marmande, made his preliminary studies in the Jesuit College at Bordeaux, and joined the Dominican Order in 1624. After finishing his theological course, he became professor of theology, and taught in several houses of his order.

In 1640 he was transferred to Paris where he undertook the publication of patristic texts. He remained there until his death.

== Works ==
He published successively the works of Amphilochius of Iconium, of Methodius of Olympus, and of Andrew of Crete, together with some writings of John Chrysostom not yet in print. In 1648 appeared his Novum Auctarium Graeco-Latinae Bibliothecae Patrum in two parts, exegitical and historico-dogmatic.

The Historia haeresis monothelitarum sanctaeque in eam sextae synodi actorum vindiciae, which formed part of the historical section of this work, met with much opposition in Rome, principally because it was at variance with the opinions of Bellarmine and Baronius. In an assembly of the French bishops held in Paris, 1655, an annual subsidy was voted to enable him to carry on his publications, the sum voted being subsequently doubled.

In 1656 he edited John Chrysostom's De educandis Liberis, in 1660 a collection of Acts of the martyrs. In 1662 there appeared the Bibliotheca Patrum Concionatoria, or "Preachers' Library of the Fathers", a rich and comprehensive work, prepared in a painstaking manner from all the available manuscripts, and containing a short historical account of all the authors whose names appeared in the work. Another important work, Auctarium Novissimum Bibliothecae Patrum, appeared at Paris in 1672.

The three following years saw many publications from the pen of Combefis. In 1674 appeared Ecclesiastes Graecus, i.e. illustrium Graecorum Patrum ac oratorum digesti sermones ac tractatus, etc. In 1675 appeared Theodoti Ancyrani adv. Nestorium liber et S. Germani patriarchae Constantinop. in S. Mariae Dormitionem et Translationem oratio historica, and in the same year an edition of the works of Maximus Confessor in two volumes with a Latin translation. A third volume of the works of Maximus Confessor was ready when Combefis died.

Perhaps the most important of the works of Combefis is his edition of Basil of Caesarea in two volumes, Basilius magnus ex integro recensitus, textus ex fide optimorum codicum ubique castigatus, auctus, illustratus, haud incerta quandoque coniectura emendatus. Versiones recognitae, etc. (Paris, 1679). This shows the critical skill of Combefis at its best, though it was later surpassed by the Maurist edition (Paris, 1721–30).

Besides these and several other critical editions of works of the Church Fathers, there were some polemical works of Combefis.
