= Saint-Pierre-d'Aurillac =

- Commune
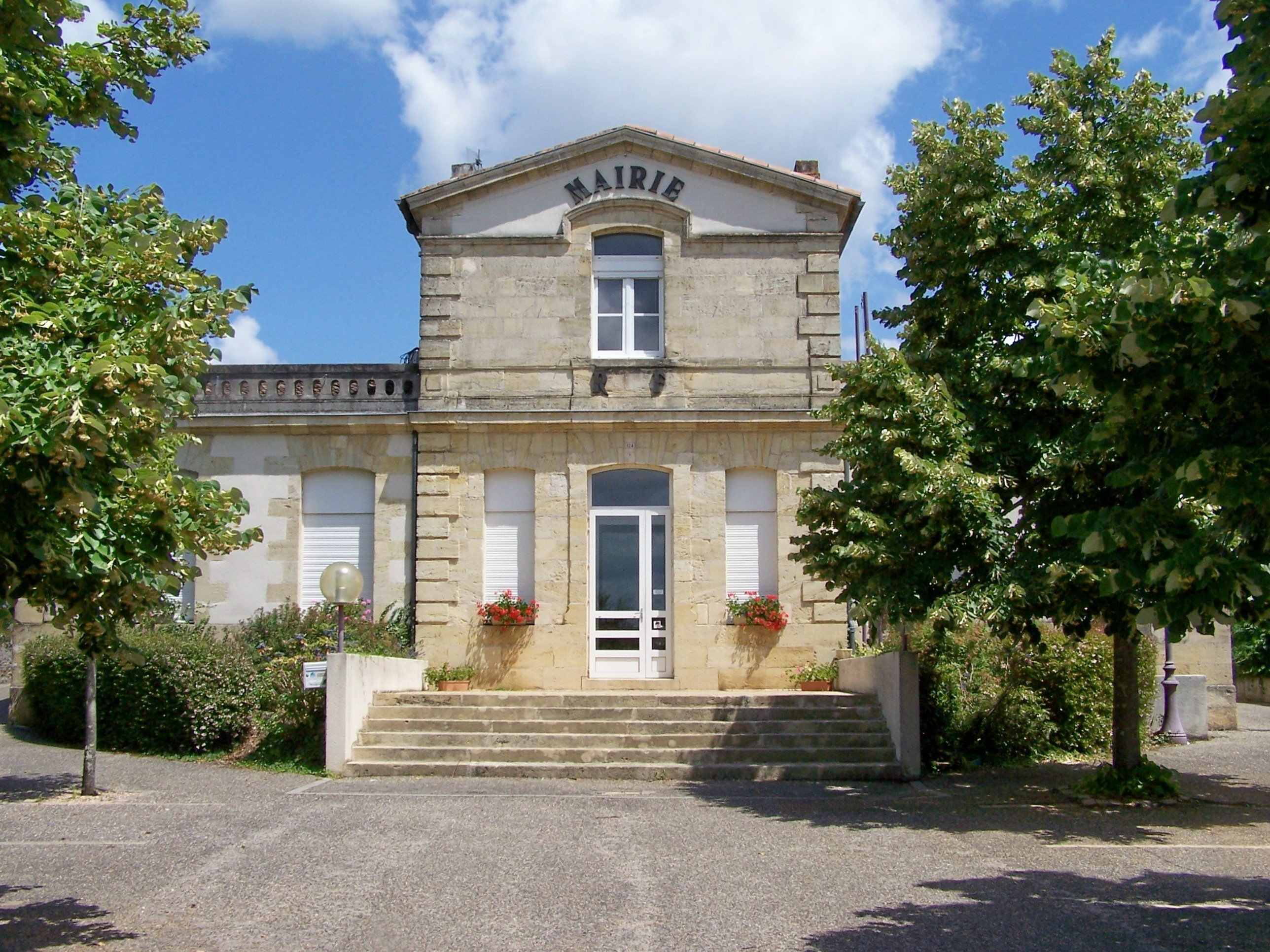
- Town hall
- Location of Saint-Pierre-d'Aurillac
- Location within France Location within Nouvelle-Aquitaine
- Coordinates: 44°34′22″N 0°11′26″W
- Country: France
- Region: Nouvelle-Aquitaine
- Department: Gironde
- Arrondissement: Langon
- Canton: L'Entre-Deux-Mers

Government
  - Mayor (2020–2026): Stéphane Denoyelle
- Area^{1}: 6.52 km^{2} (2.52 sq mi)
- Elevation: 29 m (95 ft)
- Highest elevation: 115 m (377 ft)
- Lowest elevation: 0 m (0 ft)
- Population (2023): 1,246
  - Density: 191/km^{2} (495/sq mi)
- Time zone: UTC+01:00 (CET)
  - Summer (DST): UTC+02:00 (CEST)
- INSEE/Postal code: 33463 /33490
- ^{1} French Land Register data, which excludes lakes, ponds, glaciers > 1 km^{2} (0.386 sq mi or 247 acres) and river estuaries.

Saint-Pierre-d'Aurillac (French pronunciation: [sɛ̃ pjɛʁ doʁijak]; Gascon: Sent Pèir d'Aurelhac) is a commune in the Gironde department in Nouvelle-Aquitaine in southwestern France. Saint-Pierre-d'Aurillac station has rail connections to Agen, Langon and Bordeaux.

== Population ==
Historical population
Year	Pop.	±% p.a.
1968	908	—
1975	1,008	+1.50%
1982	1,227	+2.85%
1990	1,249	+0.22%
1999	1,088	−1.52%
2007	1,284	+2.09%
2012	1,318	+0.52%
2017	1,321	+0.05%
2023	1,246	−0.97%
Source: INSEE

== See also ==
- Communes of the Gironde department
