= Marmande =

- Subprefecture and commune
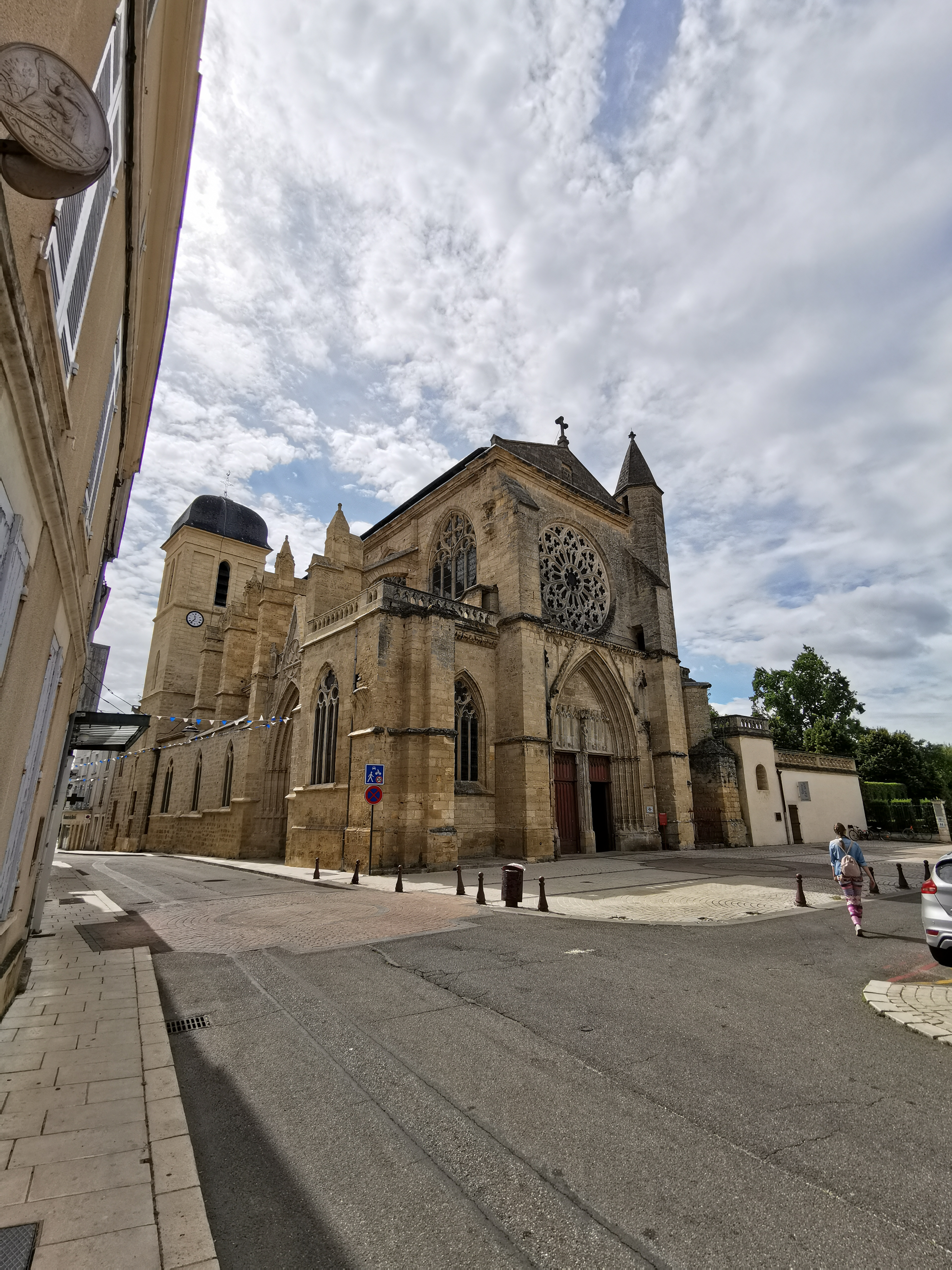
- The church and cloister in Marmande

- Coat of arms
- Location of Marmande
- Location within France Location within Nouvelle-Aquitaine
- Coordinates: 44°30′N 0°10′E
- Country: France
- Region: Nouvelle-Aquitaine
- Department: Lot-et-Garonne
- Arrondissement: Marmande
- Canton: Marmande-1 and 2
- Intercommunality: Val de Garonne Agglomération

Government
  - Mayor (2020–2026): Joël Hocquelet
- Area^{1}: 45.06 km^{2} (17.40 sq mi)
- Highest elevation: 132 m (433 ft)
- Lowest elevation: 12 m (39 ft)
- Population (2023): 17,328
  - Density: 384.6/km^{2} (996.0/sq mi)
- Time zone: UTC+01:00 (CET)
  - Summer (DST): UTC+02:00 (CEST)
- INSEE/Postal code: 47157 /47200
- ^{1} French Land Register data, which excludes lakes, ponds, glaciers > 1 km^{2} (0.386 sq mi or 247 acres) and river estuaries.

Marmande (French pronunciation: [maʁmɑ̃d]; in Occitan, Marmanda) is a commune in the Lot-et-Garonne département in south-western France.

== Geography ==
Marmande is located 35 km north-west of Agen, on the southern railway from Bordeaux to Sète. The town is situated at the confluence of the Trec with the Garonne on the right bank of the latter river, which is crossed at this point by a suspension bridge. There is a second bridge to the west of Marmande which connects the D933 from the Toulouse/Bordeaux motorway (A62) to the new by-pass, opened in July 2009, which now leads to Bergerac and the département of the Dordogne. Marmande station has rail connections to Agen, Langon and Bordeaux. Marmande ranks 481st in terms of population for the whole of France. A noted producer of tomatoes, a festival dedicated to tomatoes is held annually in July.

== History ==
Marmande was a bastide founded about 1195 on the site of a more ancient town by Richard Cœur de Lion, who granted it a liberal measure of self-government. Its position on the banks of the Garonne made it an important place of toll. It soon passed into the hands of the counts of Toulouse, and was three times besieged and taken during the Albigensian Crusade, its capture by Amaury de Montfort in 1219 being followed by a massacre of the inhabitants. It was united to the French crown under Louis IX. A short occupation by the English in 1447, an unsuccessful siege by Henry IV in 1577 and its resistance of a month to a division of Wellington's army in 1814, are some important events in its subsequent history.

In 1973 Marmande absorbed the former commune Mauvezin-sur-Gupie.

== Population ==
Population data refer to the area corresponding with the commune as of January 2025.

Historical population
Year	Pop.	±% p.a.
1968	15,559	—
1975	16,535	+0.87%
1982	16,540	+0.00%
1990	17,113	+0.43%
1999	16,770	−0.22%
2007	17,161	+0.29%
2012	18,458	+1.47%
2017	17,691	−0.85%
2023	17,328	−0.34%
Source: INSEE

== Sights ==
Apart from the administrative offices, the most notable building is the church of Notre-Dame, which dates from the 13th, 14th and 15th centuries. The windows of the nave, the altarpiece of the 18th century and, in particular, the Renaissance cloister adjoining the south side, are some of its most interesting features.

The town is host to the Garorock music festival.

== Economy ==
The town is renowned for its tomato production. The average income per household is 19,520 €/year

== Sport ==
Marmande has a grasstrack, longtrack and motorcycle speedway facility. The venue has been major venue for events and has held a final round of Individual Speedway Long Track World Championship on multiple occasions, qualifying rounds of the Speedway World Championship (the first in 1993) and a qualifying round of the Speedway World Team Cup in 1992.

The commune has a football club FC Marmande 47, who play at the Michelon Stadium.

== People linked to the commune ==
- Abel-Dominique Boyé : (1864–1934) born in Marmande; painter
- Adam Ellis : British grass track and speedway rider; 2021 British Champion, born in Marmande in 1996
- Jean-Pierre Fourcade : born in Marmande 18 October 1929; Minister of Economy and Finances from 1974 to 1976 (Prime minister: Jacques Chirac); Minister of Equipment in 1976/1977 (Prime minister : Raymond Barre); Mayor of Boulogne-Billancourt (1995–2007) and senator of Hauts-de-Seine since 1977.
- Hubert Ruffe : born in Penne-d'Agenais 29 August 1899, died 28 August 1995; active in the 1920s in defence of peasants, he was elected as a communist deputy for the Marmande constituency in 1946 and re-elected to this post seven times between 1946 and 1981. He appeared in 1974 in Jean-Daniel Simon' film Il pleut toujours où c'est mouillé, playing himself and describing the difficulties faced by peasants during that period.
- Renaud Jean : born in Marmande (1887–1961); leader of peasant syndicalism in France during the interwar period and first communist peasant deputy, in 1920, for the Marmande constituency. He was re-elected.
- Jean Cadenat : born 16 April 1908 in Marmande; died 28 June 1992 in Marmande, ichthyologist
- Léopold Faye : born 16 November 1828 in Marmande; died 5 September 1900 in Birac. He had been mayor of Marmande, then occupied national offices : minister of public instruction, religion and fine arts (12 December 1887 – 3 April 1888), then minister of agriculture in 1889.
- Jean Jules Brun : born in Marmande 24 April 1849, died 1911, minister of war under the Third Republic, from 24 July 1909 to 27 February 1911 (First government of Aristide Briand). General.
- Paul Bourrillon (1877–1942) : cyclist
- François Combefis : Dominican, born in Marmande in 1605.
- Tristan Derème : poet, born in Marmande in 1899.
- Pierrick Fédrigo : cyclist, born in Marmande 20 November 1978.
- Jean-Pierre de Vincenzi : basketball trainer, born in Marmande 27 March 1957, trainer of the French basketball team that became vice champions at the 2000 Sydney Olympics. Technical director of the Fédération Française de Basket-Ball.
- Jean-Jacques Crenca : rugby union player
- Francesca Solleville : French singer, grand daughter of the Italian socialist Luigi Campolonghi, spent part of her childhood in Marmande. In 1990, she wrote a song called "Marmande" for her album Je suis ainsi.
- Pierre Deluns-Montaud : 1845 – 1907, deputy for Marmande constituency (6 April 1879 to 31 May 1898), minister of public works under prime minister Charles Floquet 3 April 1888 to 14 February 1889.
- Fabien Lavergne: born in Marmande 25 October 1985, racing driver

== Twin towns ==
- Ejea de los Caballeros, Spain
- Portogruaro, Italy
- Peso da Régua, Portugal

== See also ==
- Côtes du Marmandais
- Communes of the Lot-et-Garonne department
