= Agen station =

Railway station in France

Coordinates: 44°12′30″N 0°37′15″E

Agen
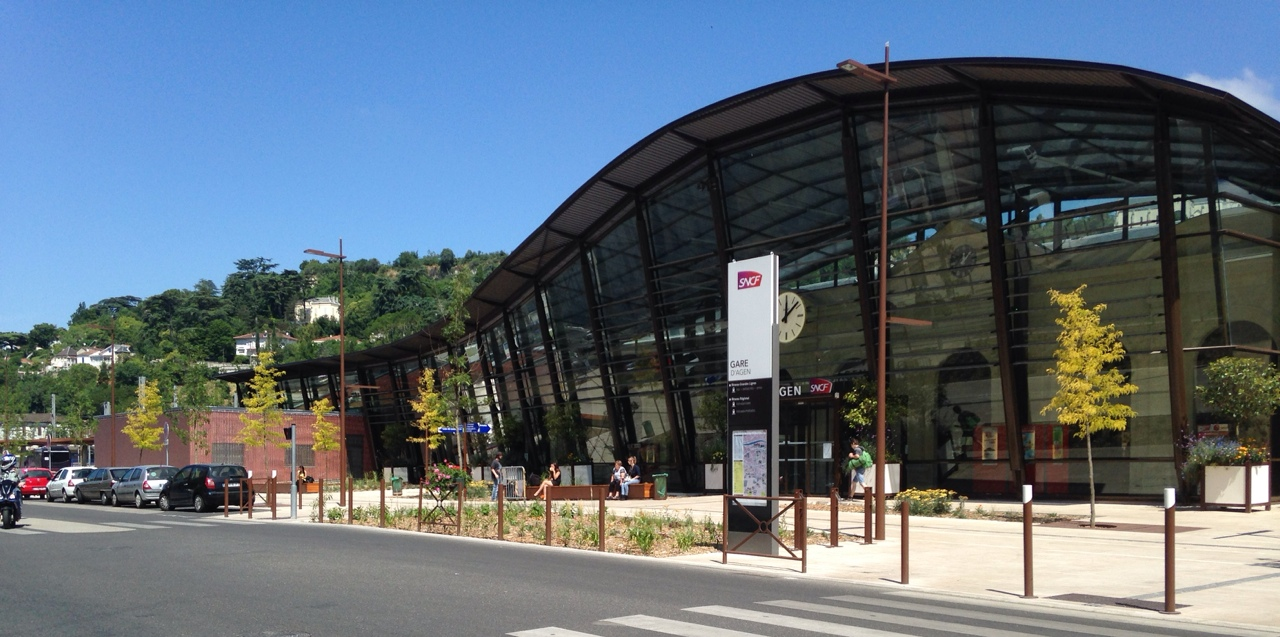
- The station from the parking

General information
- Location: Agen, Lot-et-Garonne, Nouvelle-Aquitaine; France
- Lines: Bordeaux–Sète railway, Niversac-Agen railway, Agen-Auch railway
- Platforms: 5
- Tracks: 16

Other information
- Station code: 87586008

History
- Opened: 1856

Passengers
- 2024: 1,706,718

Services
Preceding station	SNCF	Following station
Bordeaux towards Montparnasse	TGV inOui	Montauban towards Toulouse
Marmande towards Bordeaux	Intercités	Montauban towards Marseille
Preceding station	Ouigo	Following station
Bordeaux towards Paris-Montparnasse	Grande Vitesse	Montauban towards Toulouse
Preceding station	TER Nouvelle-Aquitaine	Following station
Laroque-Timbaut towards Périgueux	34	Terminus
Port-Sainte-Marie towards Bordeaux	44	Terminus
Preceding station	TER Occitanie	Following station
Terminus	18	Lamagistère towards Toulouse
Location

Agen station (French: Gare d'Agen) is a railway station in Agen, Nouvelle-Aquitaine, France. The station was opened in 1856 and is located on the Bordeaux–Sète railway, Niversac-Agen railway and Agen-Auch railway, which is used for freight. The station is served by TGV (high speed), Intercités (long distance, also night trains) and TER (local) services operated by SNCF.

== Train services ==
The following services currently call at Agen:

- high speed services (TGV) Paris - Tours - Bordeaux - Toulouse
- intercity services (Intercités) Bordeaux - Toulouse - Montpellier - Marseille
- local service (TER Nouvelle-Aquitaine) Bordeaux - Langon - Marmande - Agen
- local service (TER Nouvelle-Aquitaine) Périgueux - Le Buisson - Monsempron-Libos - Agen
- local service (TER Occitanie) Agen - Montauban - Toulouse

== See also ==
- List of SNCF stations in Nouvelle-Aquitaine
