= Rochereil =

Cave and archaeological site in France

- Rochereil Cave
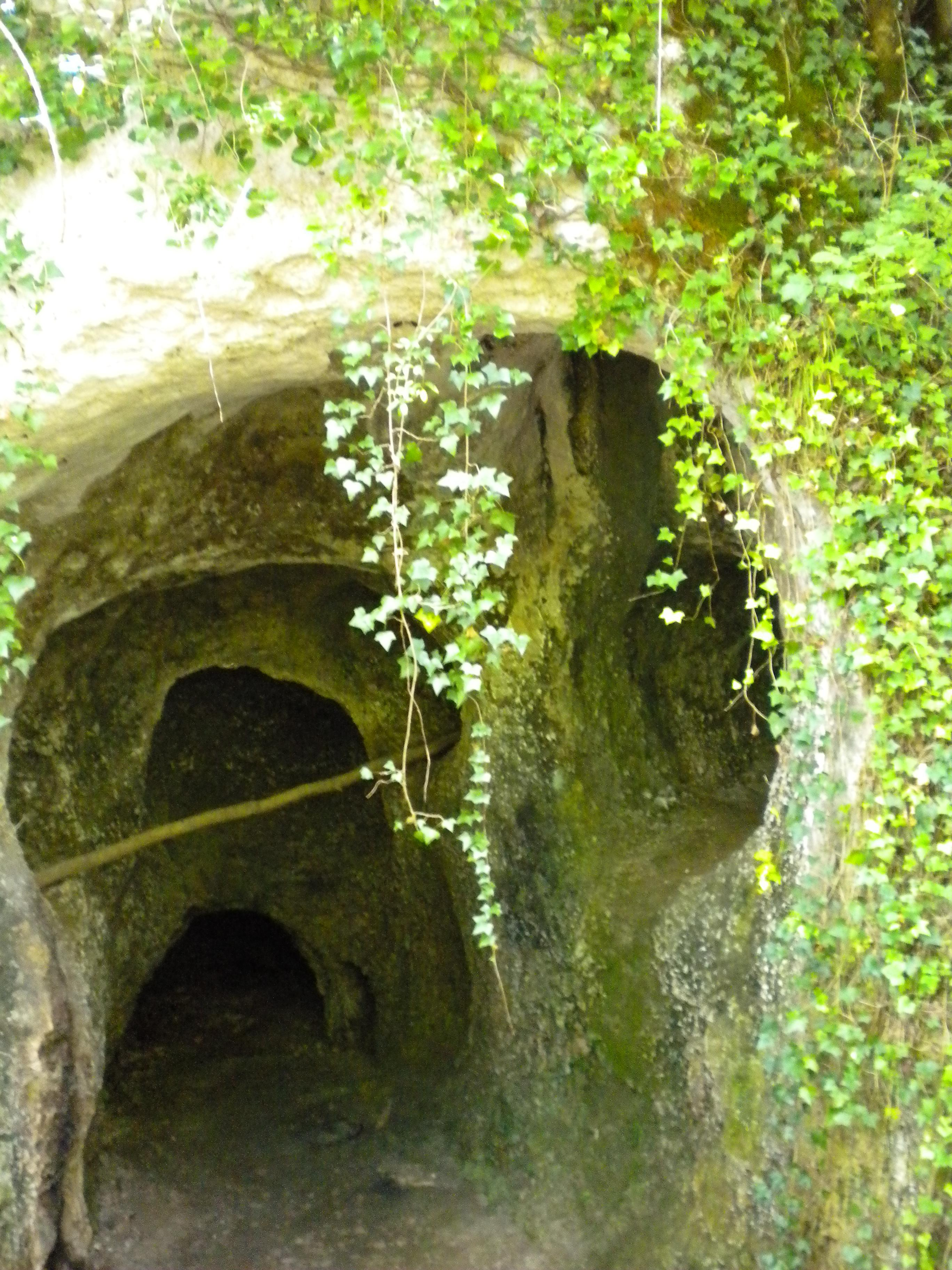
- Entrance to Rochereil Cave

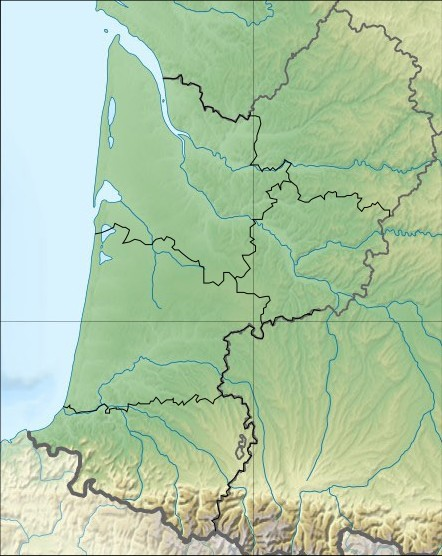
- Location in France Rochereil (France)
- 45°18′08″N 0°32′07″E
- Location: near Lisle
- Region: Dordogne, France

Rochereil is a prehistoric cave near Lisle in the French département Dordogne. Besides around 4000 stone and bone artifacts it contained the tomb of an adult human, the perforated skull of a two-year-old child and fossilized bones of two adolescent individuals.

== Geography, geology and site description ==
The Rochereil cave, sometimes also written Rochereuil, belongs to the commune of Grand Brassac. It was named after a nearby water mill, Moulin de Rochereil. The cave is situated at the right embankment of the Dronne River, not far from the confluence of the Euche, a right tributary. Lisle is about 2.5 km (1.6 mi) farther south. The cave formed in a vertical 20 m (66 ft) high limestone cliff made up of flat-lying Coniacian. In front of the cave passes a small road leading to the hamlets of Lonlaygue and Renamon. Only a little way upstream the departmental road D 2 from Saint-Just to Bussac crosses the Dronne. Over the bridge on the left side of the Dronne is a small cliff with the abri of Pont d'Ambon another notable site of the Lower Paleolithic. About 2 km (1.2 mi) farther south another site was discovered near La Peyzie containing remains from the Upper Magdalenian.

The very small cave (not more than 10 m^{2} (110 sq ft) in area) opens to the south, less than 100 m (330 ft) downstream from the mill. The entry, set back about 15 m (49 ft) from the Dronne, is only a few metres above river level and has somewhat been blocked by rockfall. The archeological finds were made in the interior of the cave and immediately in front of it.

== History ==
The first excavations at the Rochereil cave were undertaken around 1900 by the Marquis de Fayolle and by M. Féaux. This venture was overshadowed by a fatal accident due to rockfall. More detailed prospecting was done by Dr. P. E. Jude in the years 1935 till 1939. His report was published in 1960. The Rochereil cave was treated as part of Christine Duchadeau-Kervazo's master thesis in 1982. The finds are now displayed in the museum at Brantôme.

== Stratigraphy ==
The deposits of Rochereil cave can be divided into two archeological levels further subdivided into single strata. The older succession dates back to the Magdalenian VI and the younger one to the Azilian.

== Inventory ==
=== Magdalenian VI ===
The succession of the Magdalenian VI is characterised by the following stone artefacts:

- burins. Very abundant (about 60% of the total). Are mainly composed of dihedral burins, but some bec de perroquet-burins also occur.
- scrapers. Fairly unimportant (about 10%).
- knives with a squared-off back.
- spearheads of the Laugerie-Basse, Teyjat and Hamburg type.

An impressive 2000 stone artefacts were found made mainly from bluegrey silex. The silex occurs enclosed in Santonian limestones which crop out in the vicinity. Several varieties of brown flints were also used, mainly for burins and knives.

Amongst the bone tools the following items were found :

- chisels.
- needles.
- piercers.
- doubly chanfered spearheads.
- pierced batons.
- hooks.
- harpoons with two rows of barbs.

Many of the bones showed fine engravings that were executed in a very realistic manner. Towards the top of the succession the designs become more geometric. River gravels engraved with strange patterns were also discovered.

The trepanned skull of a two- to three-year-old also dates back to the Magdalenian VI.

=== Azilian ===
The Azilian finds are almost as rich as the Magdalenian ones. They stand out with their typical spearheads and flat harpoons made from deer antlers.

The Azilian succession also contained the tomb of a human adult (a 1.68-meter-tall (5.5 ft) male strongly resembling the Chancelade type) and the remains of two adolescents with calcined bones. The skeleton of the adult was not calcined, but instead surrounded by layers of ash and burnt soil – a possible indication for a burial ritual.

Very rich Azilian finds were made at the Pont d'Ambon site.

== Age ==
The Rochereil cave has not been dated absolutely, but the unearthed artefacts are characteristic for the Magdalenian VI and for the Azilian. This corresponds to the age period of 12.500 to 10.500 years BP.

== See also ==
- Azilian
- Magdalenian
- Pont d'Ambon
- Raymonden

== Literature ==
- Delluc, B. & G., Roussot, A. & Roussot-Larroque, J. (1990). Connaître la préhistoire en Périgord. Éditions SUD-OUEST, ISBN 2-87901-048-9
- Jude, P.E. (1960). La grotte de Rochereil: station magdalénienne et azilienne. In: Archives de l'Institut de Paléontologie Humaine, mém 30. Masson, p. 75.
- Platel, J.-P. et al. (1989). Périgueux (Ouest). In: Carte géologique de la France à 1/50 000. BRGM, Orléans, ISBN 2-7159-1758-9
