= Château de Puyferrat =

Château in Saint-Astier, France

Coordinates: 45°08′56″N 0°30′24″E

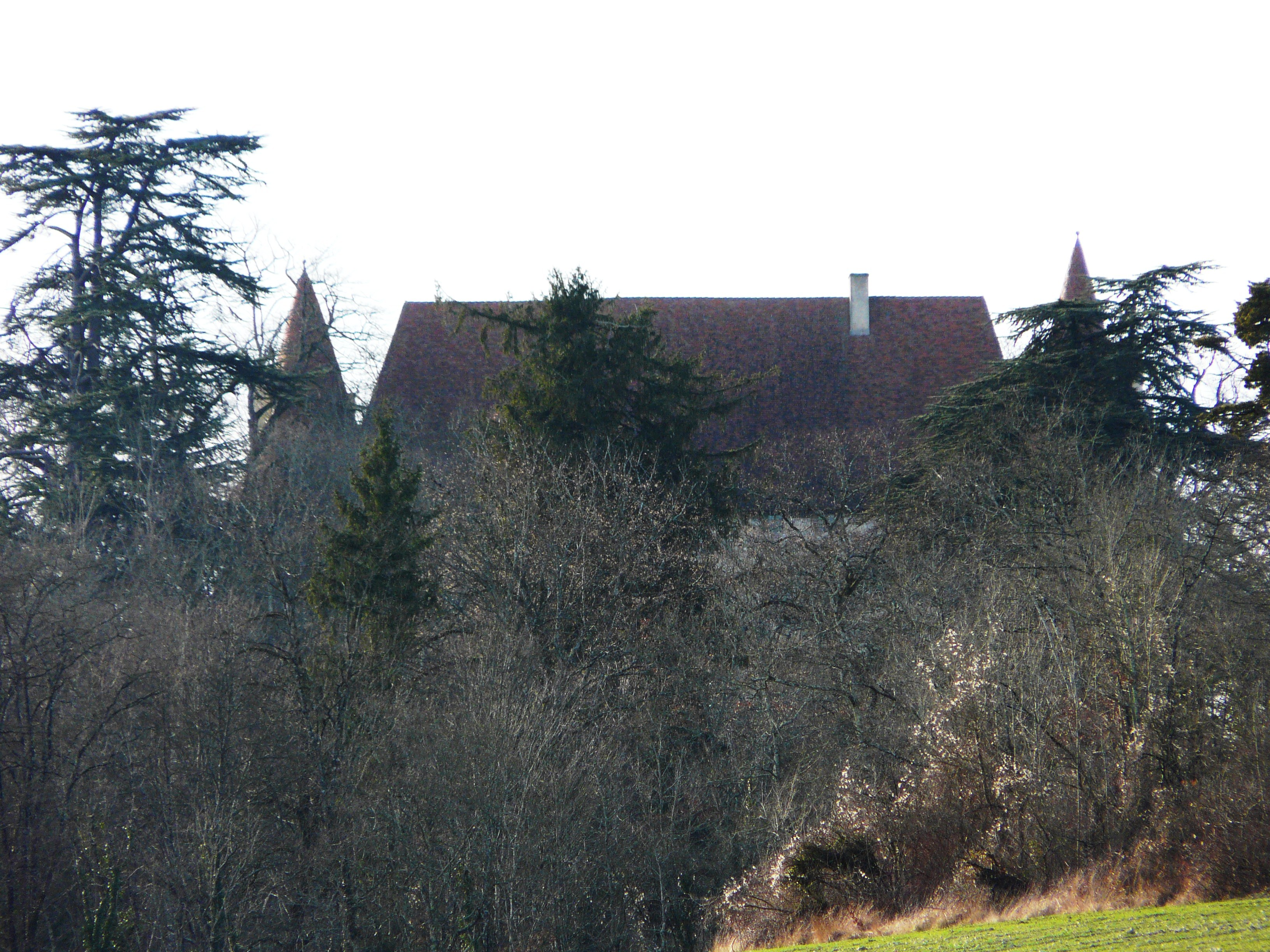
Château de Puyferrat

The Château de Puyferrat is a 16th-century château in Saint-Astier, Dordogne, Nouvelle-Aquitaine, France.
