= Léo Testut =

French physician and anatomist

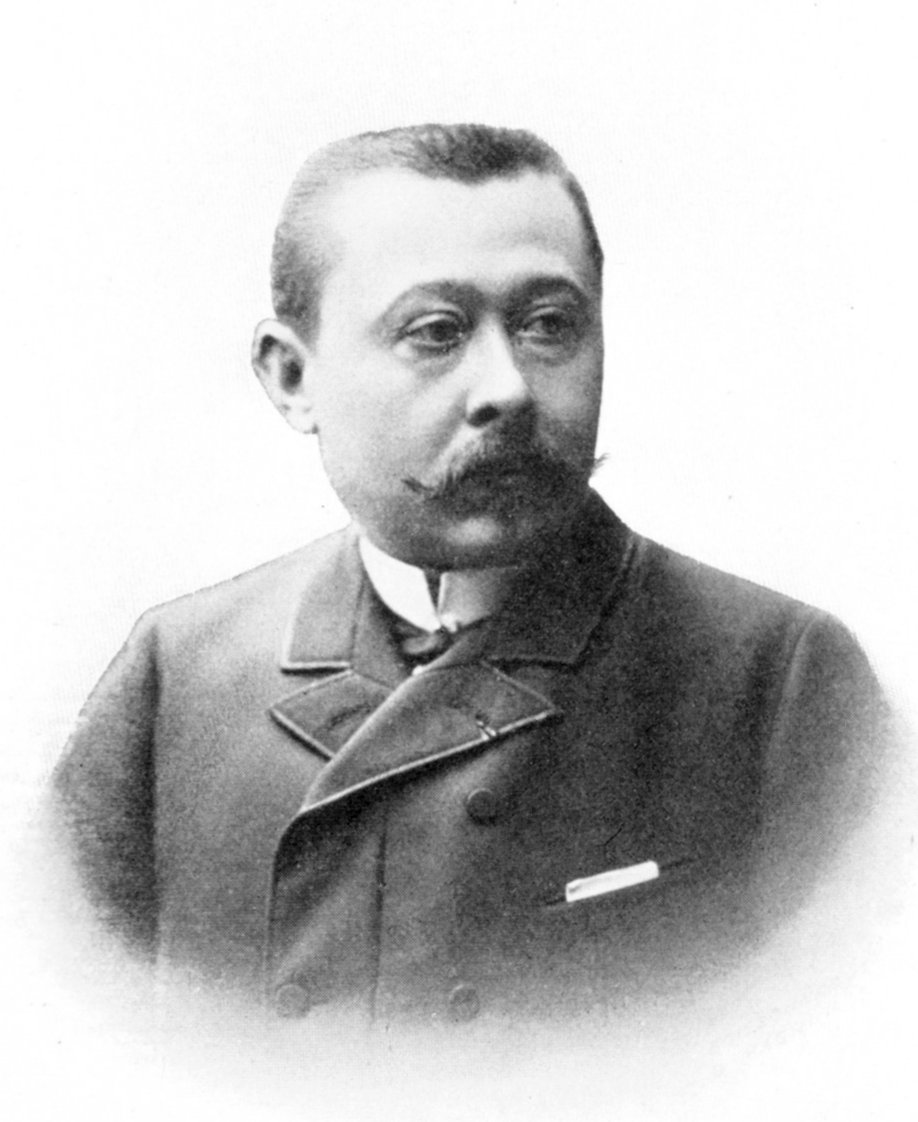
Leo Testut (1849–1925)

Leo Testut (22 March 1849 – 16 January 1925) was a French physician and anatomist, born in Saint-Avit-Sénieur, Dordogne.

He was born Jean Leo Testut on 22 March 1849, the son of Jean Testut and Marie Deynat. He studied medicine in Bordeaux. His studies were interrupted because of the Franco-Prussian War of 1870; he was readmitted to the Bordeaux School of Medicine in 1878. He completed his studies with a thesis for which he obtained medals from several universities in France. He was named Professor of Anatomy of the Bordeaux School of Medicine and continued his investigations in anthropology in other universities. He contributed over 90 publications on anatomy, anthropology, prehistory and history, but his most noteworthy achievement has been as author of Traité d´anatomie humaine, a complete, well-written, and well-illustrated work of anatomy composed of four volumes that continues to be used in many countries to the present day. The illustrations present in this book continue to be a major source of reference to other anatomy books. The book is well known in medical schools, where it is considered the standard anatomy textbook. He collected the material published from personal notes and drawings after having failed anatomy exams several times during medical school, until he finally passed.

In 1889, Léo Testut announced that a prehistoric skull, found in Chancelade, was of a new race, which he called the "Chancelade race", which he argued was the ancestor of the Eskimo. This hypothesis, though confirmed by many of his contemporaries, is now rejected, and the Chancelade skull is considered to be a Cro-Magnon. Leo Testut died on 16 January 1925 in Bordeaux.
