= Raymonden =

Cave and archaeological site in France

- Abri de Raymonden (French)
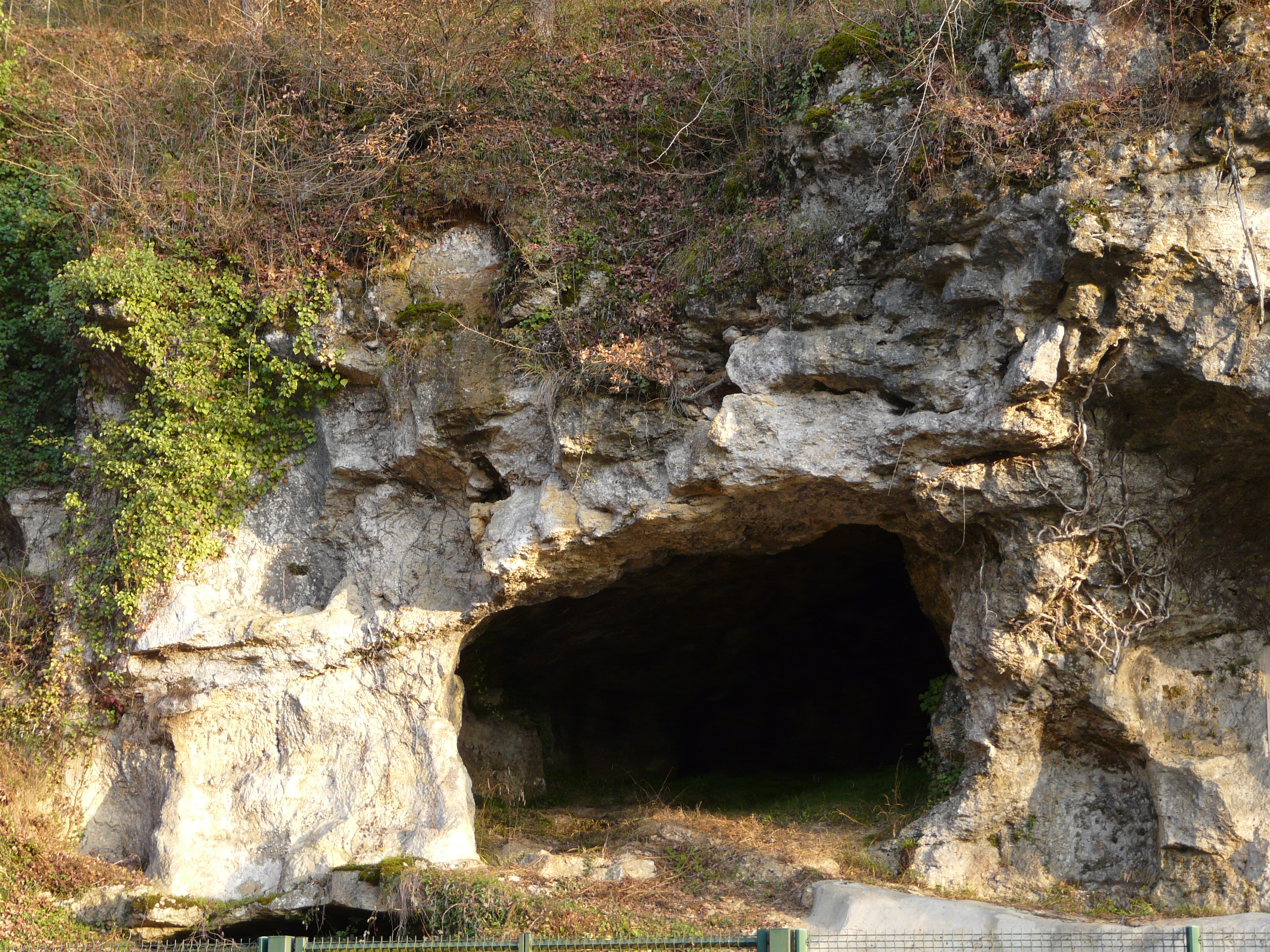
- Raymonden entrance

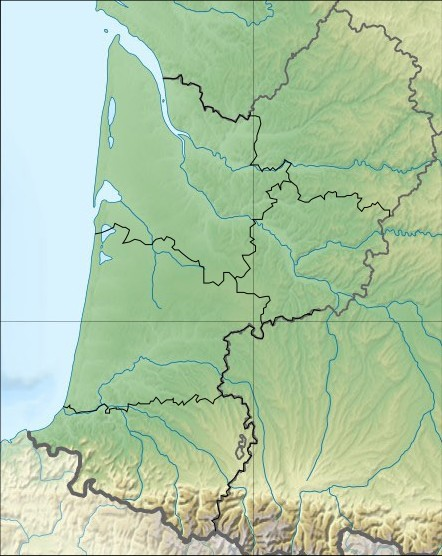
- Location in France Raymonden (France)
- 45°12′25″N 0°40′25″E
- Type: limestone
- Periods: Upper Palaeolithic
- Cultures: Magdalenian
- Location: near Chancelade
- Region: département Dordogne, France

Site notes
- Material: limestone
- Excavation dates: 1876
- Archaeologists: M. Hardy

Raymonden is a prehistoric cave near Chancelade in the French département Dordogne. The cave was inhabited during the Upper Paleolithic and contained, besides many artefacts, a human skeleton.

== Geography, geology and site description ==
The Raymonden cave occurs about one kilometer north of Chancelade on the left bank of the Beauronne river, a right-hand tributary of the Isle river. Just north of the cave the Beauronne starts to meander forming a first loop which is accompanied on its left side by a steep, rocky ledge. The rocks are composed of flat-lying Angoumian limestones, a local formation of the Turonian. The Angoumian used to be extensively quarried for building stones, and an enclosed resistant layer was mined for mill stones. The entry to the cave is hemmed in between two quarries, not far from the borough of les Grèzes. In front of the cave passes the D 939 from Périgueux to Brantôme, a major trunk road.

== History ==
The prehistoric site was discovered in 1876 by M. Hardy, who also started the excavation work. He was followed in 1883 by two college teachers from Périgueux. During the construction of the railway line from Périgueux to Brantôme the deposits in front of the cave (including many stone and bone artefacts) were erroneously used as gravel for the track foundations and consequently spread out over nearly a kilometer ! After this vandalism with irreparable damage Hardy and M. Féaux started a systematic study of the site which lasted till 1888. Their endeavours were crowned by success because at the base of the archeological layer they found a tomb with human remains.

In 1927 L. Didon excavated a section in front of Raymonden cave, which was subjected to occasional flooding. After his death the work was continued by J. B. Bouyssonie from 1928 till 1929.

== Stratigraphy ==
The damage done to the cave deposits by the railway workers seriously disturbed the original succession. Despite this considerable drawback in 1891 Hardy was still able to distinguish four ash layers within the 1.35 meter thick archeological succession; the individual ash layers were separated by thin sandy and clayey levels. The recovered artefacts were then brought to the Musée du Périgord in Périgueux but regrettably their exact position within the succession was never recorded. Even so certain characteristic finds clearly indicate the cultural epochs Magdalenian IV to Magdalenian VI.

The excavations in front of the cave by Didon and Bouyssonie also distinguished four layers, but they were older and had to be attributed to the Magdalenian I – III.

Raymonden was thus the only archeological site in the Périgord that once contained the entire Magdalenian section.

== Inventory ==
The Raymonden cave contained a multitude of stone and bone artefacts from the Magdalenian including numerous art works' such as the bison plate (in French plaquette au bison).

The Magdalenian I was mainly composed of draw knives but showed hardly any real knife blades. The Magdalenian II was very rich in knife blades, followed by scrapers and burins in equal proportion. The Magdalenian III is clearly dominated by burins.

The bone artefacts mainly originated from reindeer. During the Magdalenian II the saiga antelope appeared. Remarkable is the discovery of seal bones within the Magdalenian VI !

=== Tomb ===
The tomb at the base of the succession contained a human skeleton, that of Chancelade man. This find has considerable morphological differences from the older (Aurignacian) Cro-Magnon 1 skull. The skeleton was resting on its left side and the knees were drawn to the torso. The left hand was covered by the skull, and the right hand touched the chin. The corpse must have been sprinkled with red iron oxide powder (ochre), because the bones are stained red. The skeleton is now kept in the Musée du Périgord.

The Chancelade Man was 55 to 60 years old and about only about 1.55 meters tall. His cranial volume was measured 1,530 cm^{3}, larger than the modern European average of c. 1,350 cm^{3} but somewhat smaller than the Aurignacian (Cro-Magnon) average of about 1,600 cm^{3}.

He must have suffered from chronic rheumatism. The right half of the skull had undergone several lesions that later had healed over again.

== Raymonden-North ==
A bit farther north from Raymonden cave is another small cave, sometimes also designated as Chancelade cave. In this cave remains dating back to the Mousterian (MTA-type), to the Lower Périgordian and to the Aurignacian were found.

== Age ==
Raymonden-North is a much older prehistoric site already inhabited during the Mousterian. The main cave spans the entire Magdalenian which corresponds roughly to the interval 17.000 to 11.000 years BP. It possibly was also inhabited during the Azilian.

== See also ==
- Rochereil
- Aurignacian
- Azilian
- Magdalenian
- Mousterian
- Perigordian

== Literature ==
- Delluc, B. & G., Roussot, A. & Roussot-Larroque, J. (1990). Connaître la préhistoire en Périgord. Éditions SUD-OUEST. ISBN 2-87901-048-9 .
- Platel, J.-P. et al. (1989). Périgueux (Ouest). In: Carte géologique de la France à 1/50 000. BRGM, Orléans. ISBN 2-7159-1758-9 .
