= Canton of Coulounieix-Chamiers =

Canton of Dordogne, France

Coordinates: 45.19°N 0.69°E

The canton of Coulounieix-Chamiers is an administrative division of the Dordogne department, southwestern France. It was created at the French canton reorganisation which came into effect in March 2015. Its seat is in Coulounieix-Chamiers.

It consists of the following communes:

1. Chancelade
2. Coulounieix-Chamiers
3. Marsac-sur-l'Isle
4. Razac-sur-l'Isle
