= Chancelade Abbey =

- Abbaye Notre-Dame de Chancelade
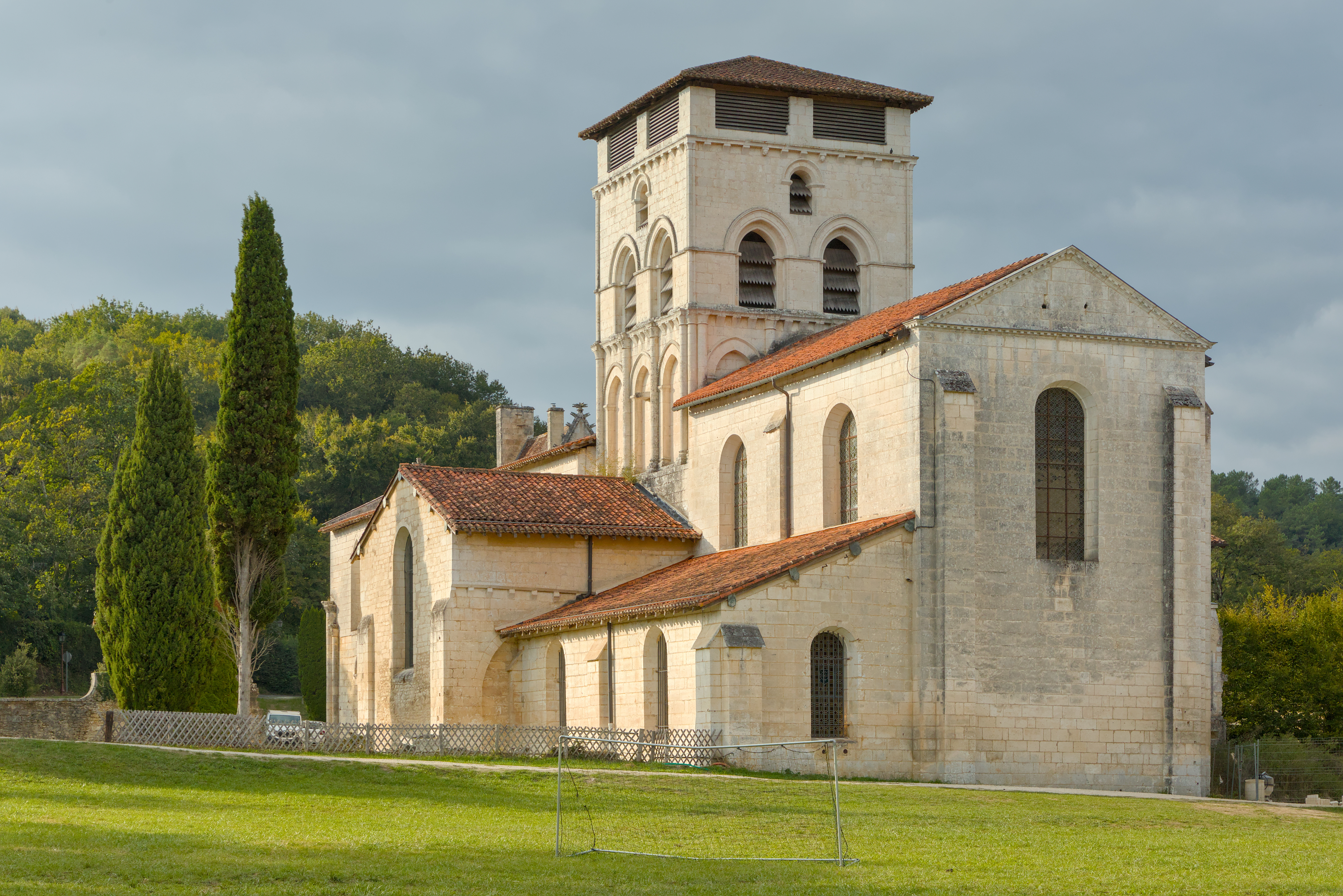
- Chancelade abbey church

- Location
- 45.2075°N 0.6667°E
- Location: Chancelade, Dordogne
- Country: France
- Denomination: Roman Catholic
- Website: Friends of Chancelade Abbey (in French)

History
- Founded: 1129
- Dedication: Our Lady

Architecture
- Functional status: Defunct
- Architectural type: Romanesque

Chancelade Abbey (French: Abbaye Notre-Dame de Chancelade) is an Augustinian monastery in Chancelade in the Dordogne. It was founded in 1129.

The abbey was damaged by English troops in the 14th century during the Hundred Years' War and again by Protestants in the 16th century during the French Wars of Religion.

Alain de Solminihac (beatified in 1981 by John Paul II) had the abbey restored in 1623. He was consecrated abbot of Chancelade by Urban VIII in 1636.

Economist Nicolas Baudeau taught theology at the abbey.

A contemporary monastic community is now in occupation of some buildings and in 2016 completed a new community house on the site.

== Gallery ==
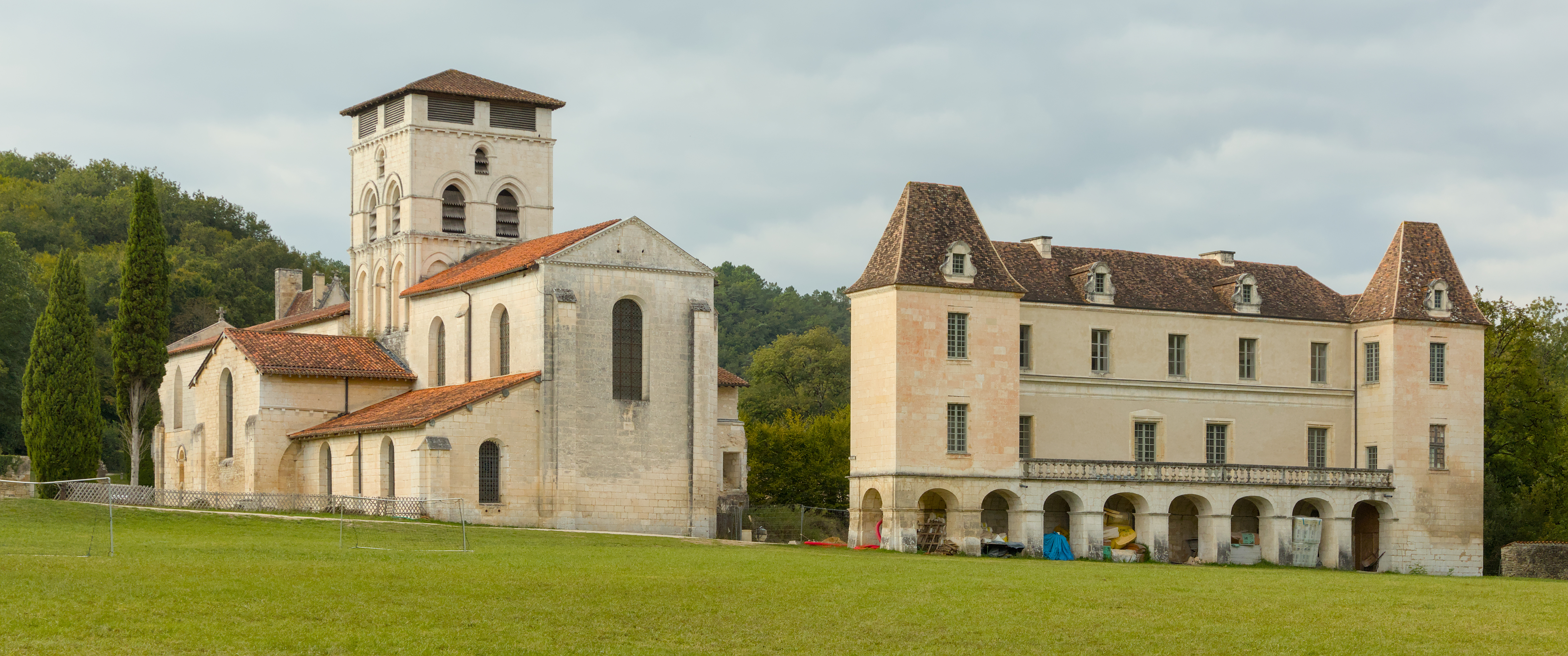
The church and former abbey buildings.

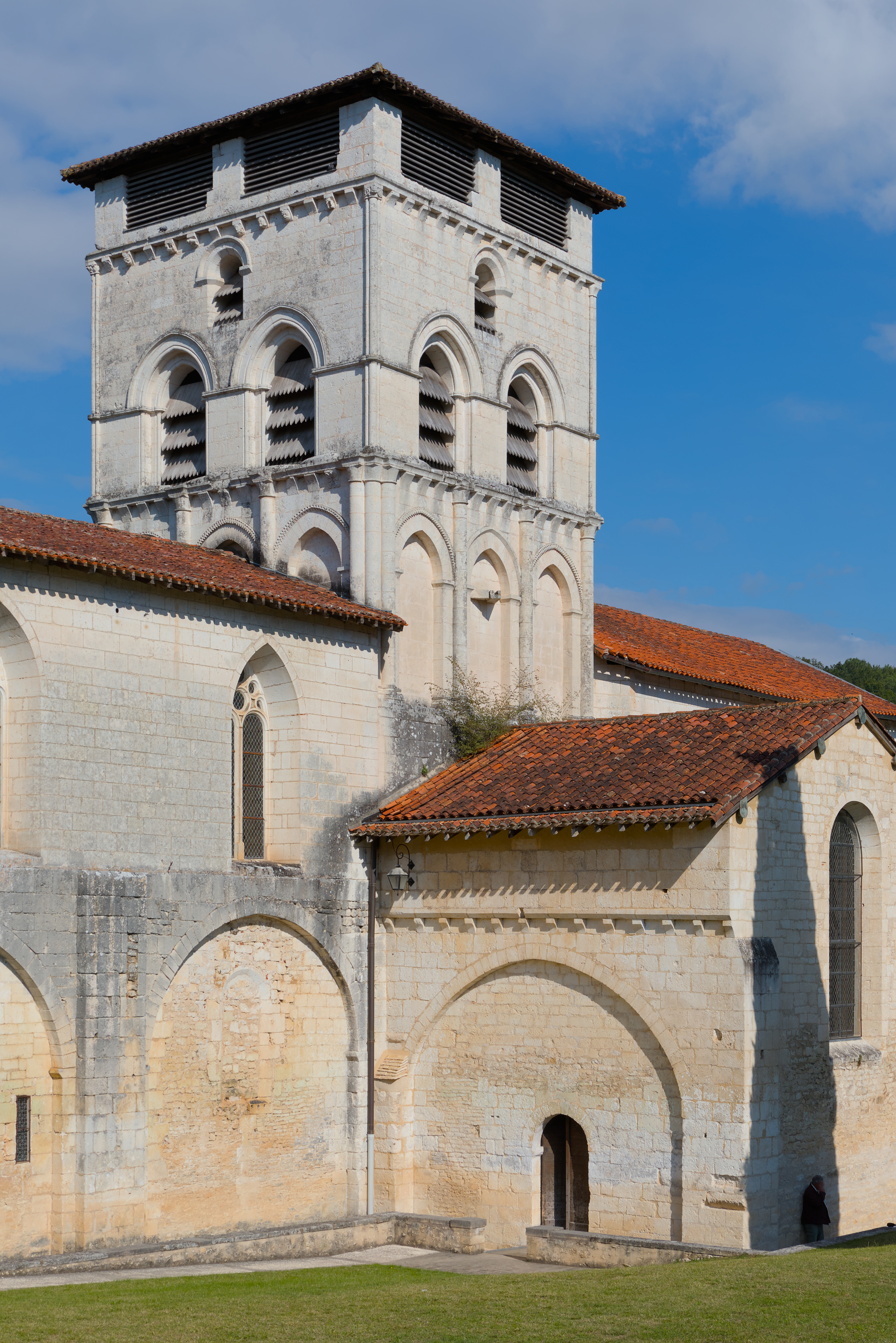
Bell tower.

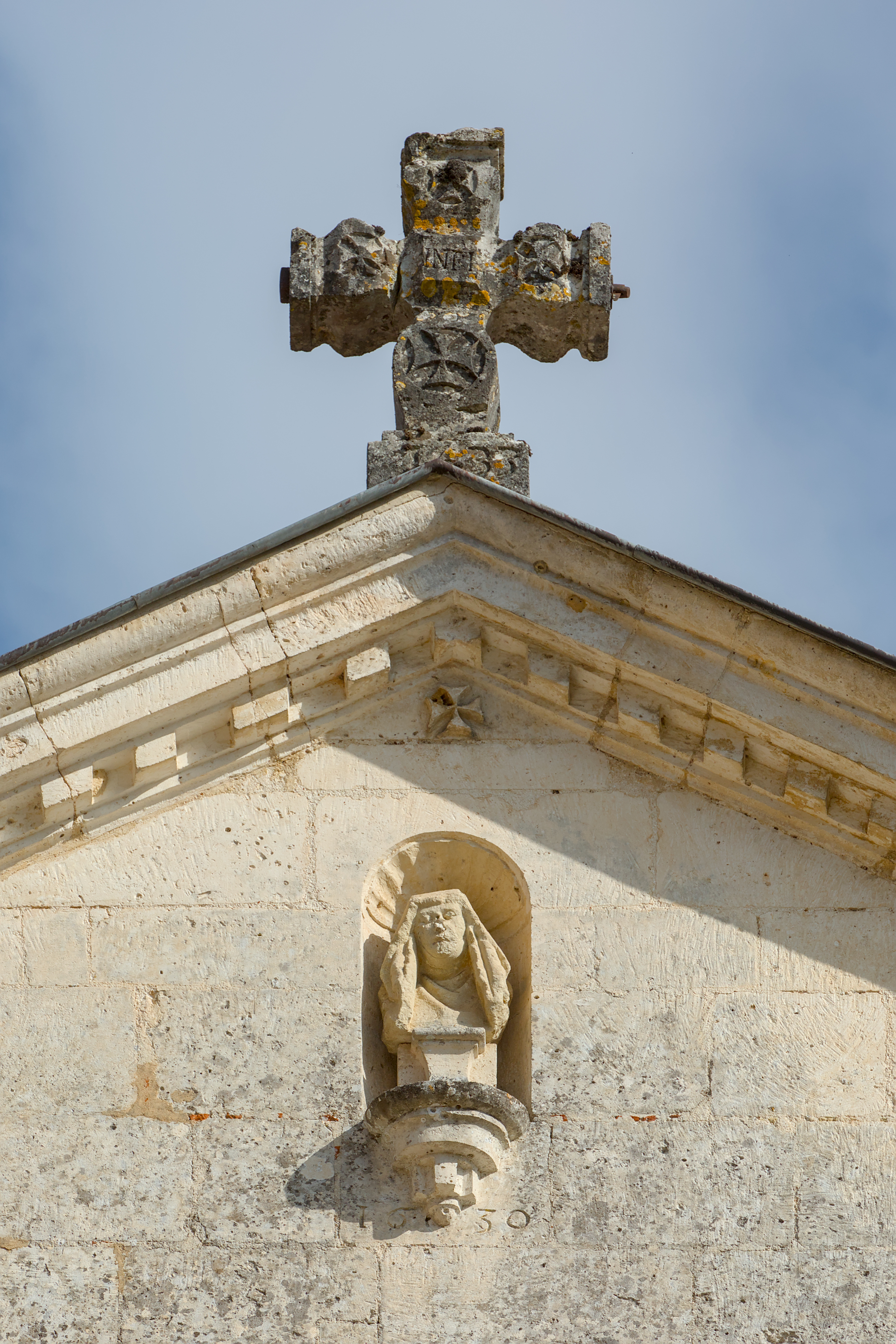
Details of the church façade.

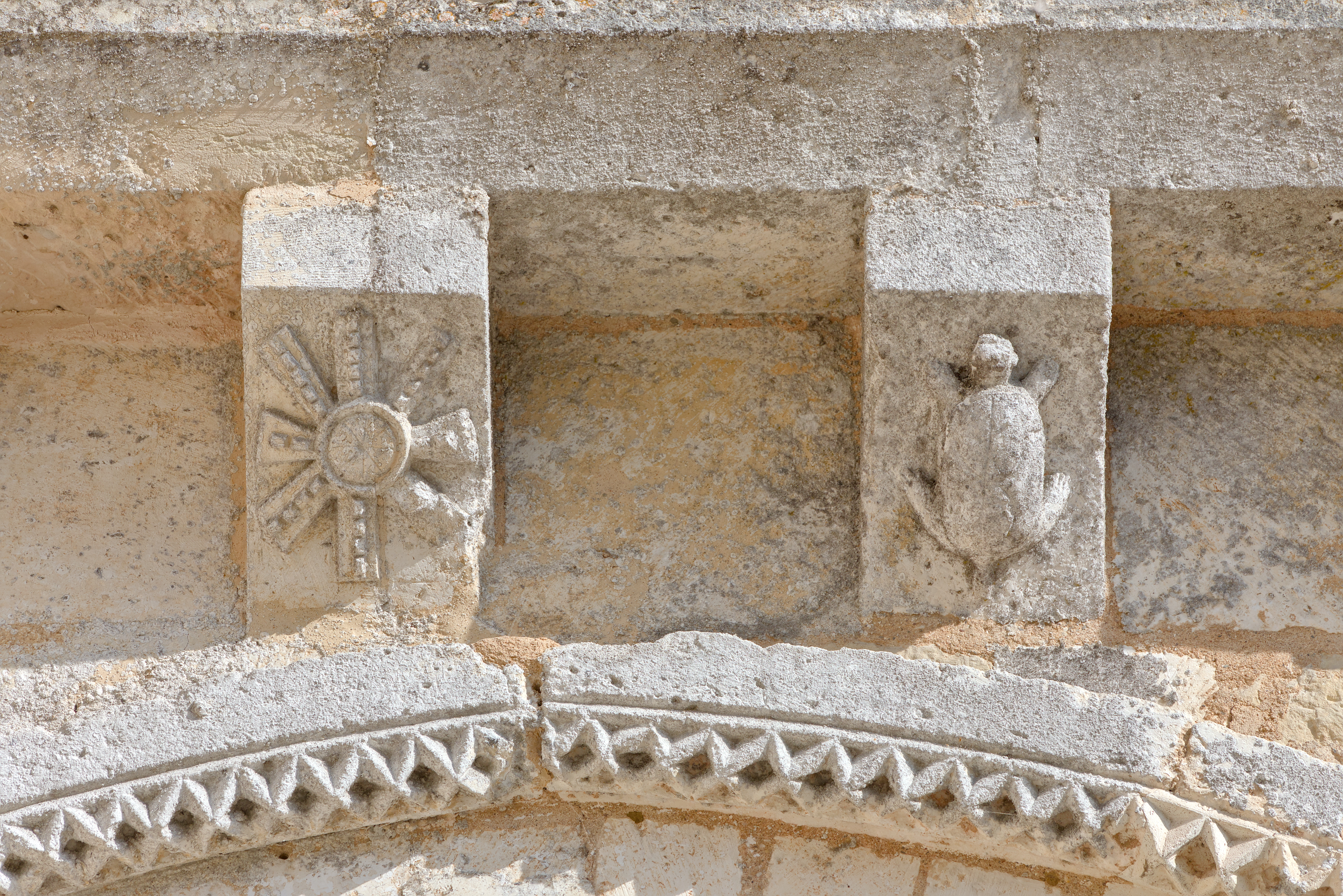
Details of the church façade.

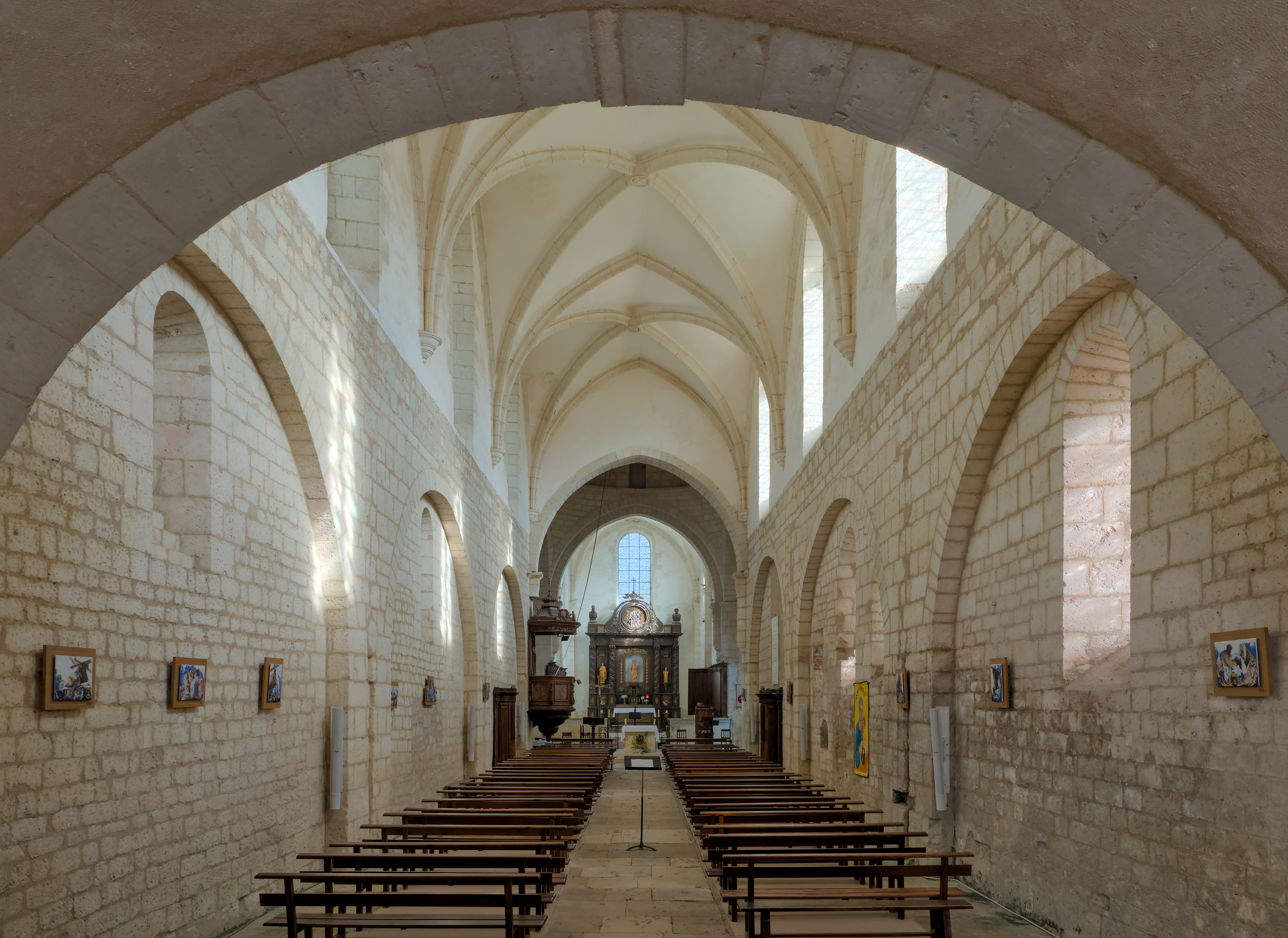
Church interior.

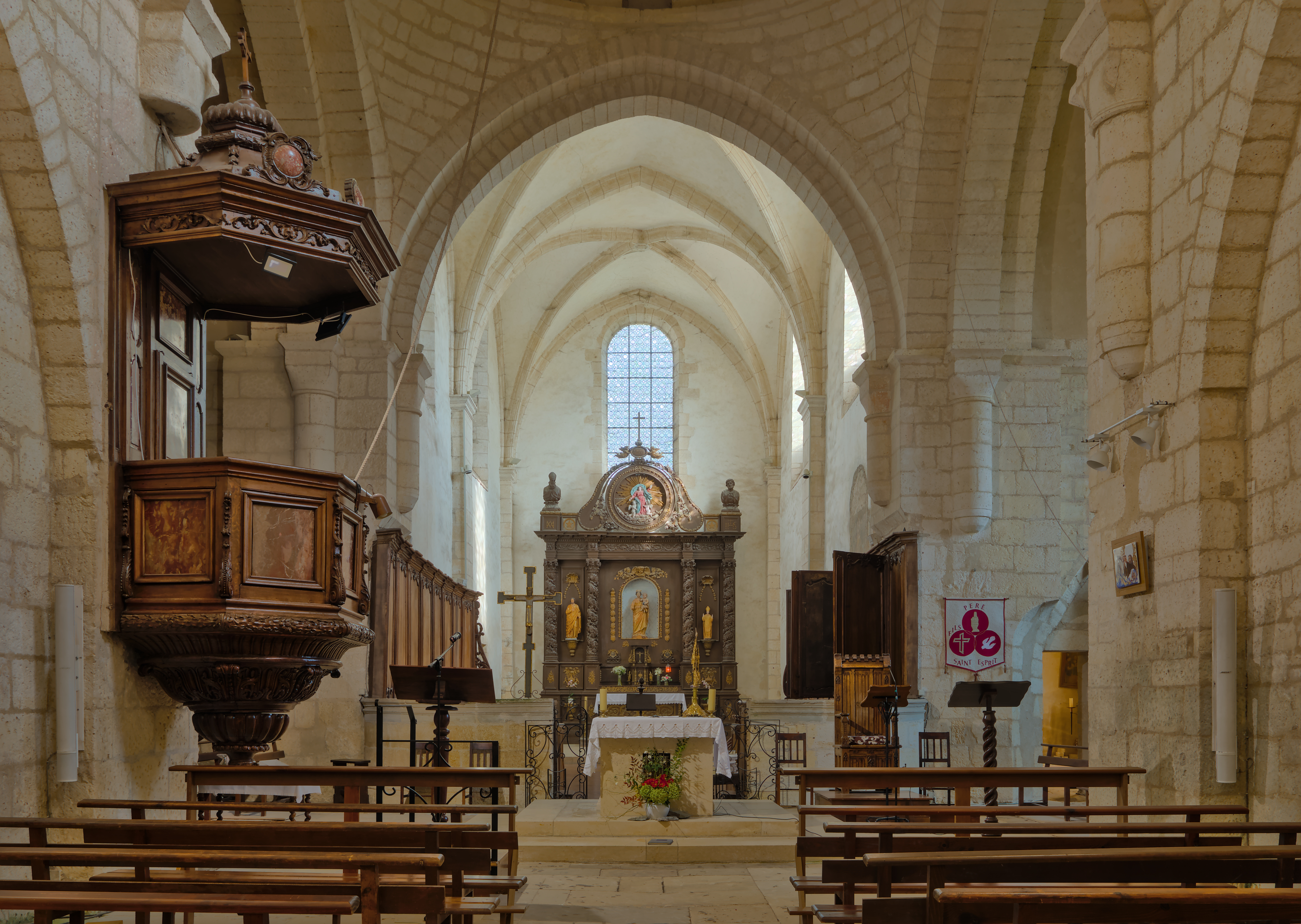
Church interior.

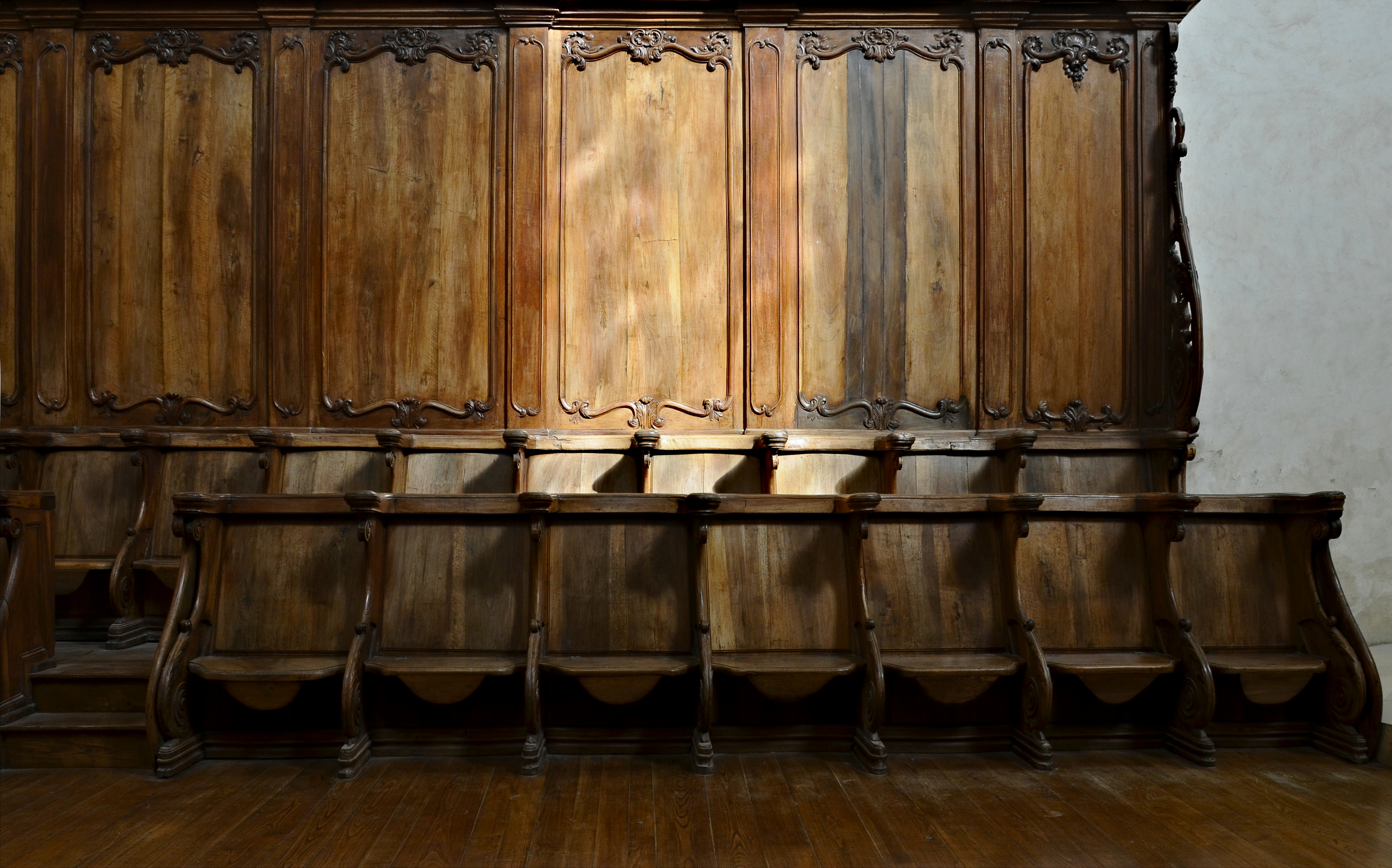
Choir stalls.

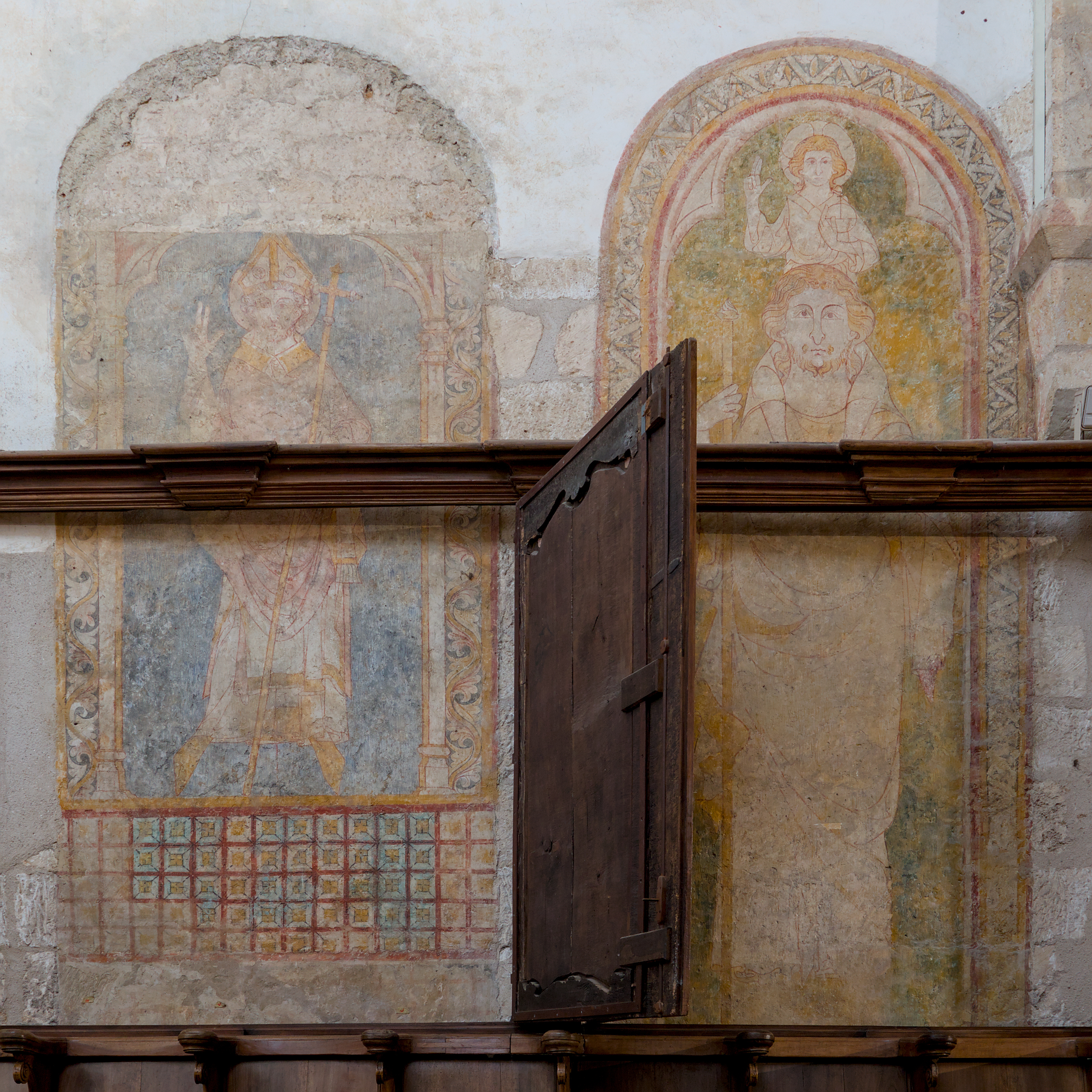
Frescos on the choir walls, partly covered by wooden panels.
