= Saint-Astier station =

Railway station in Saint-Astier, France

Coordinates: 45°08′20″N 0°31′22″E

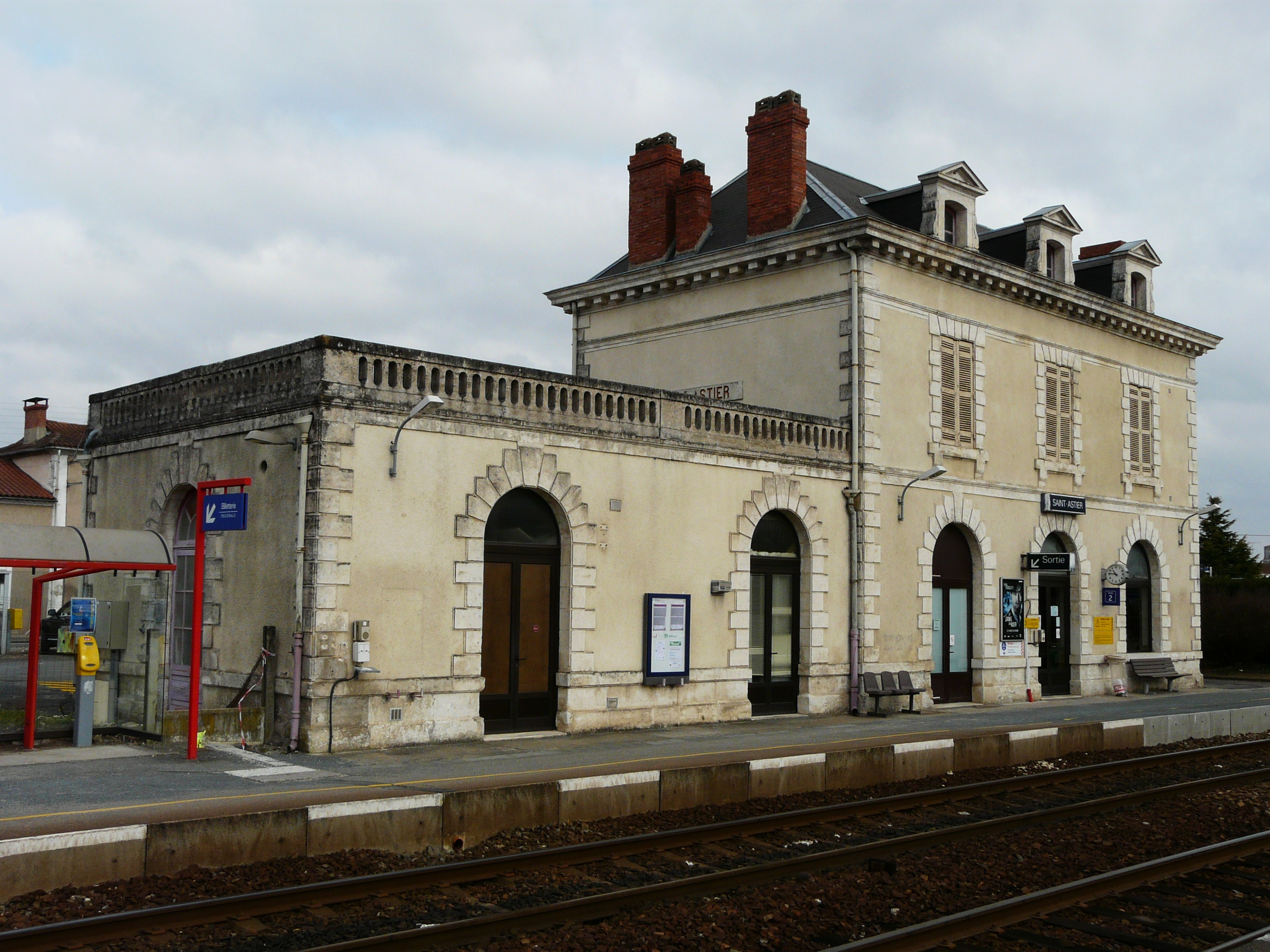
Gare de Saint-Astier

Saint-Astier is a railway station in Saint-Astier, Nouvelle-Aquitaine, France. The station is located on the Coutras - Tulle railway line. The station is served by TER (local) services operated by SNCF.

== Train services ==
The station is served by regional trains to Bordeaux, Périgueux, Limoges and Brive-la-Gaillarde.

| Preceding station | TER Nouvelle-Aquitaine | Following station |
|---|---|---|
| Saint-Léon-sur-l'Isle towards Bordeaux | 31 | Razac towards Limoges |
| Saint-Léon-sur-l'Isle towards Bordeaux | 32 | Razac towards Ussel |
