= Razac-sur-l'Isle =

- Commune
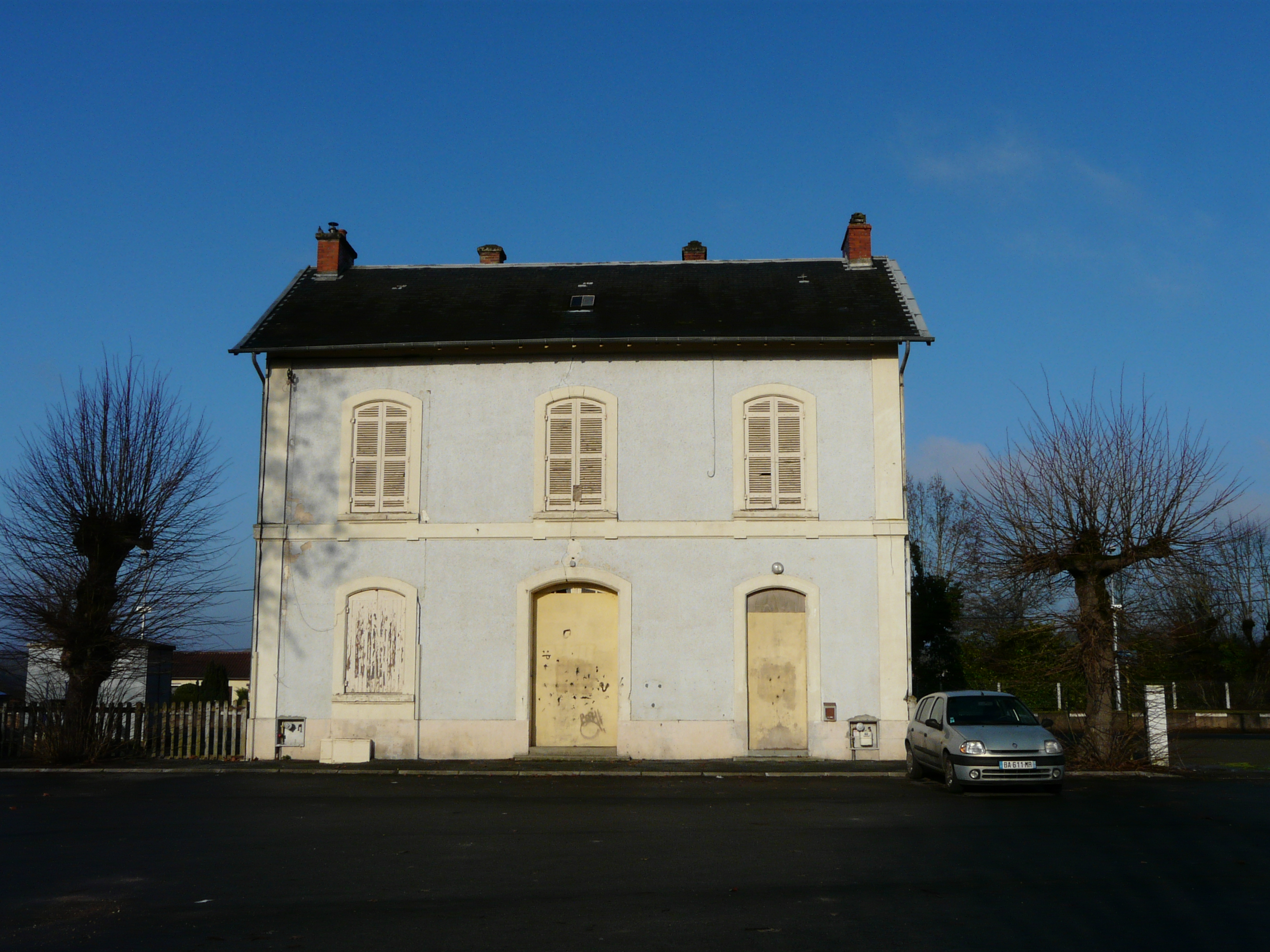
- Train station

- Coat of arms
- Location of Razac-sur-l'Isle
- Location within France Location within Nouvelle-Aquitaine
- Coordinates: 45°09′53″N 0°36′02″E
- Country: France
- Region: Nouvelle-Aquitaine
- Department: Dordogne
- Arrondissement: Périgueux
- Canton: Coulounieix-Chamiers
- Intercommunality: Le Grand Périgueux

Government
  - Mayor (2020–2026): Jean Parvaud
- Area^{1}: 14.24 km^{2} (5.50 sq mi)
- Elevation: 75 m (246 ft)
- Highest elevation: 203 m (666 ft)
- Lowest elevation: 69 m (226 ft)
- Population (2023): 2,376
  - Density: 166.9/km^{2} (432.1/sq mi)
- Time zone: UTC+01:00 (CET)
  - Summer (DST): UTC+02:00 (CEST)
- INSEE/Postal code: 24350 /24430
- ^{1} French Land Register data, which excludes lakes, ponds, glaciers > 1 km^{2} (0.386 sq mi or 247 acres) and river estuaries.

Razac-sur-l'Isle (French pronunciation: [ʁazak syʁ lil], literally Razac on the Isle; Occitan: Rasac d'Eila) is a commune in the Dordogne department in Nouvelle-Aquitaine in southwestern France. Razac station has rail connections to Bordeaux, Périgueux, Brive-la-Gaillarde and Limoges.

== Population ==
Historical population

| Year | Pop. | ±% p.a. |
|---|---|---|
| 1793 | 950 | — |
| 1800 | 714 | −4.00% |
| 1806 | 763 | +1.11% |
| 1821 | 829 | +0.55% |
| 1831 | 869 | +0.47% |
| 1836 | 858 | −0.25% |
| 1841 | 846 | −0.28% |
| 1846 | 889 | +1.00% |
| 1851 | 895 | +0.13% |
| 1856 | 923 | +0.62% |
| 1861 | 897 | −0.57% |
| 1866 | 855 | −0.95% |
| 1872 | 865 | +0.19% |
| 1876 | 910 | +1.28% |
| 1881 | 932 | +0.48% |
| 1886 | 995 | +1.32% |
| 1891 | 880 | −2.43% |
| 1896 | 862 | −0.41% |
| 1901 | 811 | −1.21% |

| Year | Pop. | ±% p.a. |
|---|---|---|
| 1906 | 809 | −0.05% |
| 1911 | 723 | −2.22% |
| 1921 | 783 | +0.80% |
| 1926 | 829 | +1.15% |
| 1931 | 829 | +0.00% |
| 1936 | 837 | +0.19% |
| 1946 | 941 | +1.18% |
| 1954 | 1,065 | +1.56% |
| 1962 | 1,218 | +1.69% |
| 1968 | 1,364 | +1.90% |
| 1975 | 1,702 | +3.21% |
| 1982 | 2,062 | +2.78% |
| 1990 | 2,212 | +0.88% |
| 1999 | 2,276 | +0.32% |
| 2007 | 2,422 | +0.78% |
| 2012 | 2,414 | −0.07% |
| 2017 | 2,395 | −0.16% |
| 2023 | 2,376 | −0.13% |

Source: EHESS and INSEE (1968-2023)

== See also ==
- Communes of the Dordogne department
