= Chancelade man =

Hominin fossil

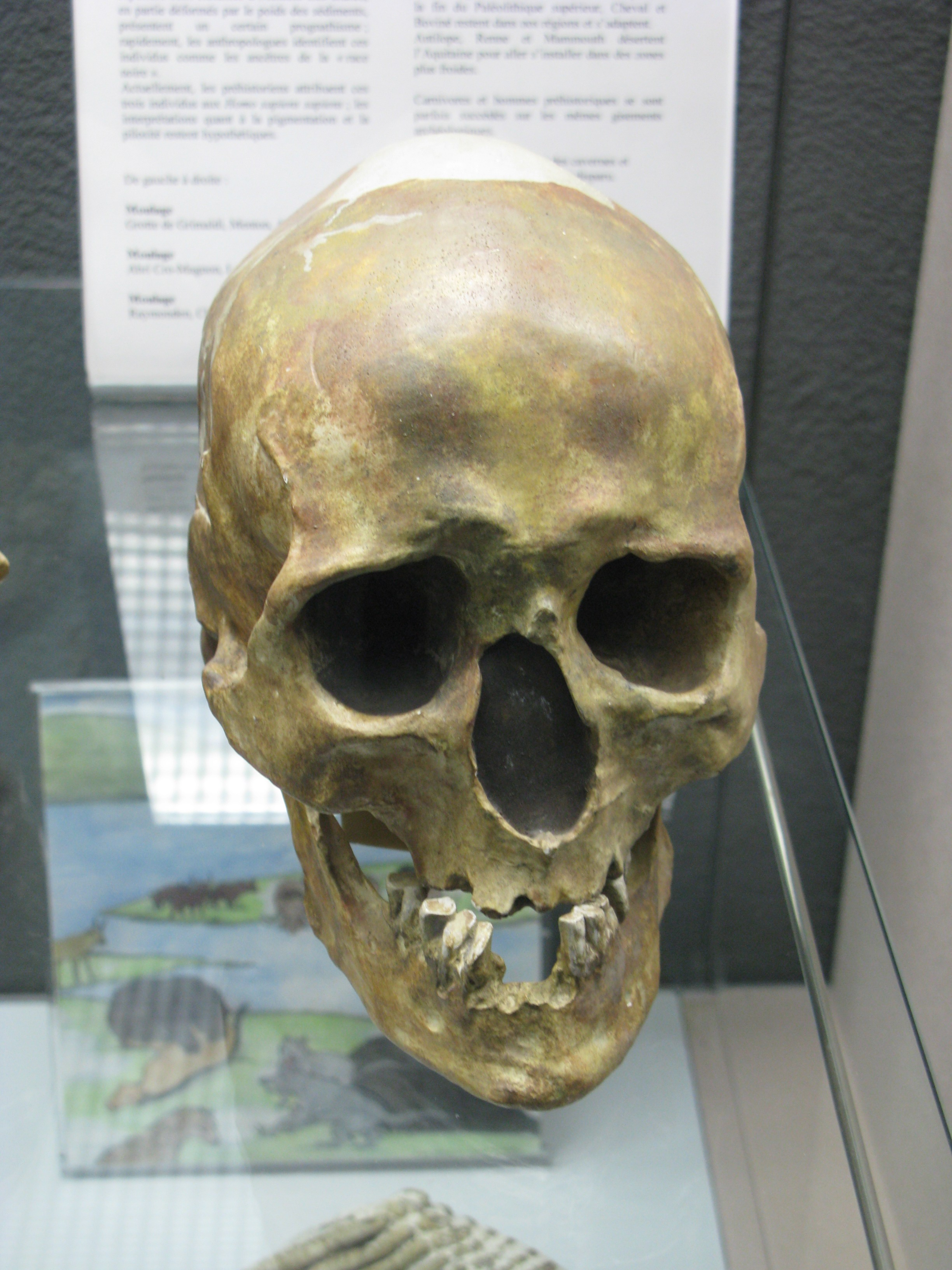
- Cast of skull of Chancelade man
- Died: 17,000 to 12,000 years ago (aged c. 60); Now Chancelade, Dordogne, France
- Body discovered: 1888

Chancelade man (the Chancelade cranium) is an ancient anatomically modern human fossil of a male found in Chancelade in France in 1888. The skeleton was that of a rather short man, who stood a mere 1.55 m (5.1 ft) tall.

Due to morphological differences with the Cro-Magnon 1 cranium, early interpretations postulated that the individual belonged to a separate lineage, possibly ancestral to Eskimos. G. M. Morant in 1930 recognized the skeleton as within the morphological range of Upper Paleolithic European populations, and this interpretation has remained accepted since.

== Discovery ==
The Chancelade find was discovered in 1888 in the cave of Raymonden Chancelade in the Dordogne. Lying all the way down by the bedrock, below three layers containing Magdalenian tools, the find contained a single skeleton. The skeleton was that of an adult man, estimated to have been between 55 and 65 at death. The man had been intentionally buried and liberally coated with ochre. The skeleton was found in a flexed position with the knees bent up to the chin. The grave also contained Magdalenian tools, dating from 17,000 to 12,000 years before present.

== Morphology ==
The individual was relatively small (1.55 m (5.1 ft)) and stocky, but had cranial capacity of about 1,530 cm^{3}, somewhat larger than the modern European average but in the range of Cro-Magnon adult male average of about 1,600 cm^{3}. The cranium is rather narrow, but long and tall, and with a clear sagittal keel along the suture between the parietal bones. The face was large, both wide and high, with high orbits quite close together and of somewhat rectangular shape. The cheek-bones were also quite prominent, high and broad at the same time. The nasal opening was tall but narrow, and the nasal bone (now lost on the original Chancelade skull) indicates a pronounced nasal bridge and large nose, similar to that found in some European and Middle Eastern people. The chin was well developed and the limb bones were strong. The original skeleton is today housed in the Musée d'art et d'archéologie du Périgord in Perigueux.

The difference in cranial morphology was noted by French anatomist Leo Testut, who in 1889 published the hypothesis that Chancelade Man was of a separate stock than the Cro-Magnon fossils, perhaps representing a lineage ancestral to Eskimos. While both the cranium of Cro-Magnon 1 and the Chancelade find were markedly dolicocephalic, the Cro-Magnon skull was long and broad, with a very large cranial capacity of 1,730 cm^{3}, the Chancelade skull narrow and tall, and with a smaller brain volume. The Chancelade skeleton, together with finds from Laugerie-Basse and the Duruthy cave near Sorde-l'Abbaye were grouped as a distinct "Magdalenian race", presumed to have been primarily reindeer hunters. This population was thought to have differed from the larger, big-game hunting Cro-Magnon people, being of shorter and stockier build, with longer faces, a long nose and tall orbitae, unlike the broader faces of the Cro-Magnons. This was the mainstream interpretation until the 1920s.

This study was part of a prevailing view of the time, dividing the many pre-historic finds into more finely grained racial groups than is presently the norm. In the racial anthropology of the early 20th-century, the Chancelade lineage was proposed to belonging to a lineage ancestral to the Mongoloid race, while, similarly, Grimaldi Man was interpreted as ancestral to the Negroid race.

== "Cro-Magnon" (terminology) ==
In the second half of the 20th century, new finds from Jebel in Israel, Combe-Capelle in France, Minatogawa in Japan and several Paleo-Indians had considerably broadened the knowledge of early man. All these finds were found to group with Cro-Magnons rather than with Neanderthals, and the old term "Cro-Magnon" in some 1970s literature was extended to include what would today be called anatomically modern humans in general. In this understanding of the term "Cro-Magnon", the short and stocky Chancelade man did not stand out. This change coincided with a shift of paleoanthropological focus away from Europe.

Because of the divergence in the use of the term "Cro-Magnon" in the 1970s, its use in scholarly literature has been mostly discontinued. The wide sense is covered by anatomically modern humans (equivalent to the species name Homo sapiens in literature which considers Homo neanderthalensis a separate species) and its narrow sense covered by European early modern humans (EEMH).

Modern knowledge of the genetic history of Europe demonstrates that the European continent has been populated in several waves of genetically distinct populations, the lineage of the Upper Paleolithic EEMH populations being dubbed "West European Hunter-Gatherers".

== See also ==
- Archaic human admixture with modern humans
- Denisova hominin
- List of fossil sites (with link directory)
- List of human evolution fossils
- Neanderthal interaction with Cro-Magnons
