= Razac station =

Railway station in Razac-sur-l'Isle, France

Coordinates: 45°09′57″N 0°35′56″E

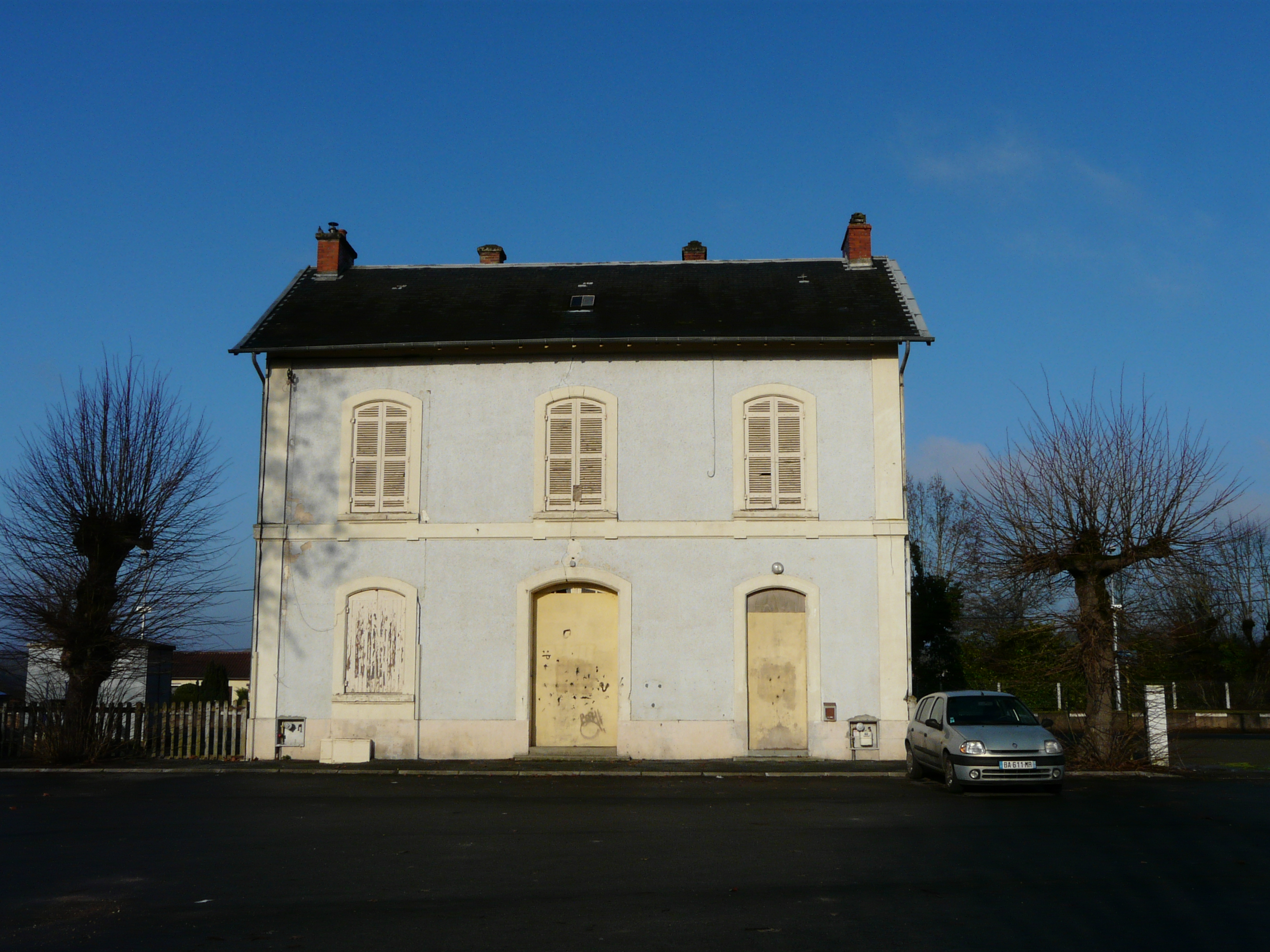
Razac station

Razac is a railway station in Razac-sur-l'Isle, Nouvelle-Aquitaine, France. The station is located on the Coutras - Tulle railway line. The station is served by TER (local) services operated by SNCF.

== Train services ==
The station is served by regional trains towards Bordeaux, Périgueux, Limoges and Brive-la-Gaillarde.

Preceding station	TER Nouvelle-Aquitaine	Following station
Saint-Astier towards Bordeaux	31	Périgueux towards Limoges
Saint-Astier towards Bordeaux	32	Périgueux towards Ussel
