= Marsac-sur-l'Isle =

- Commune
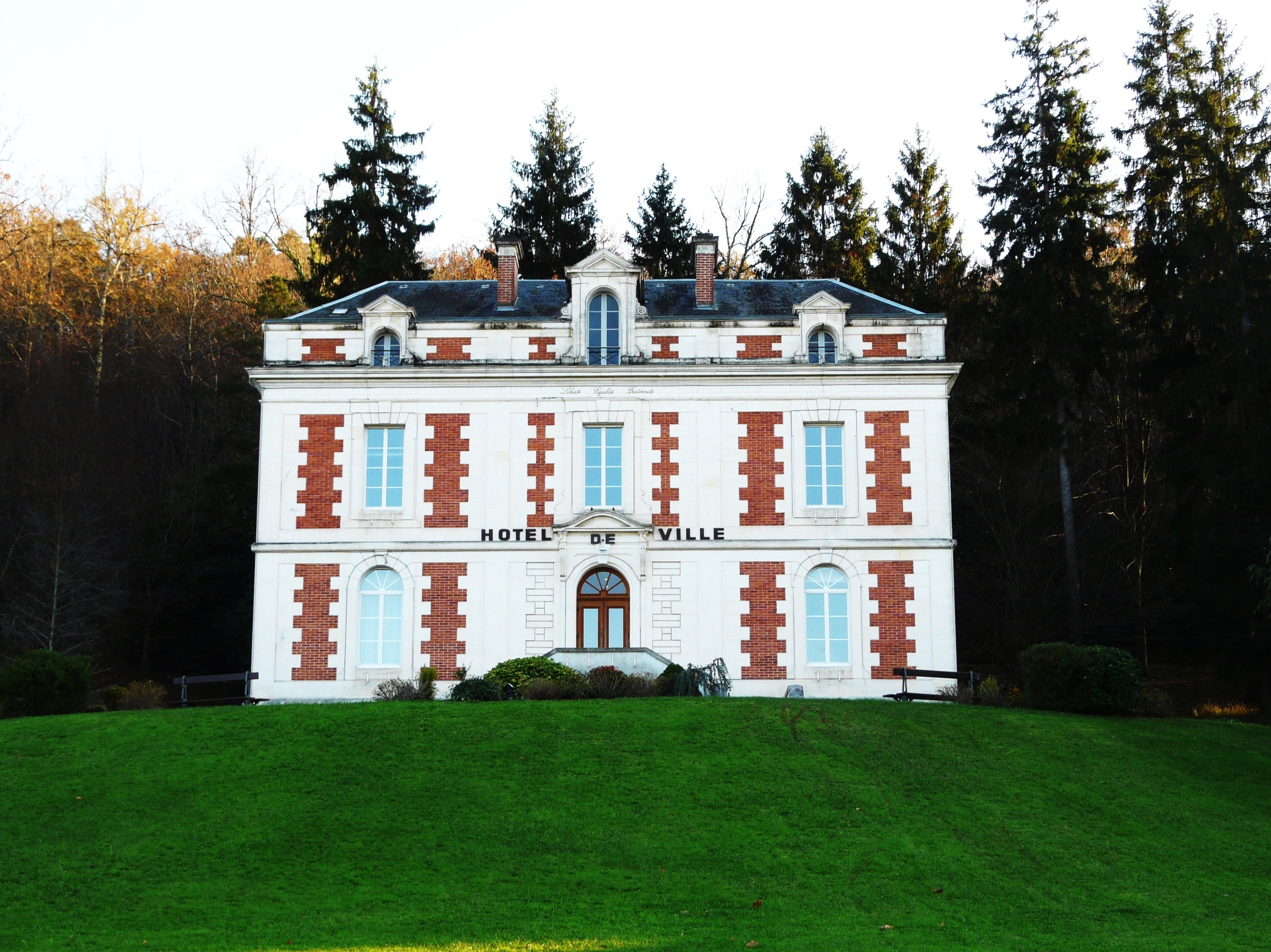
- Town hall
- Location of Marsac-sur-l'Isle
- Location within France Location within Nouvelle-Aquitaine
- Coordinates: 45°11′09″N 0°39′43″E
- Country: France
- Region: Nouvelle-Aquitaine
- Department: Dordogne
- Arrondissement: Périgueux
- Canton: Coulounieix-Chamiers
- Intercommunality: Le Grand Périgueux

Government
  - Mayor (2020–2026): Yannick Bidaud
- Area^{1}: 10.05 km^{2} (3.88 sq mi)
- Elevation: 83 m (272 ft)
- Highest elevation: 187 m (614 ft)
- Lowest elevation: 71 m (233 ft)
- Population (2023): 3,187
  - Density: 317.1/km^{2} (821.3/sq mi)
- Time zone: UTC+01:00 (CET)
  - Summer (DST): UTC+02:00 (CEST)
- INSEE/Postal code: 24256 /24430
- ^{1} French Land Register data, which excludes lakes, ponds, glaciers > 1 km^{2} (0.386 sq mi or 247 acres) and river estuaries.

Marsac-sur-l'Isle (French pronunciation: [maʁsak syʁ lil], literally Marsac on the Isle; Occitan: Marsac d'Eila) is a commune in the Dordogne department in Nouvelle-Aquitaine in southwestern France.

== Population ==
Historical population

Year	Pop.	±% p.a.
1793	460	—
1800	517	+1.68%
1806	496	−0.69%
1821	545	+0.63%
1831	453	−1.83%
1836	485	+1.37%
1841	505	+0.81%
1846	552	+1.80%
1851	484	−2.59%
1856	502	+0.73%
1861	549	+1.81%
1866	556	+0.25%
1872	541	−0.45%
1876	577	+1.62%
1881	609	+1.09%
1886	581	−0.94%
1891	568	−0.45%
1896	566	−0.07%
1901	520	−1.68%

Year	Pop.	±% p.a.
1906	502	−0.70%
1911	430	−3.05%
1921	446	+0.37%
1926	455	+0.40%
1931	468	+0.57%
1936	488	+0.84%
1946	597	+2.04%
1954	630	+0.67%
1962	1,053	+6.63%
1968	1,216	+2.43%
1975	1,569	+3.71%
1982	1,657	+0.78%
1990	1,939	+1.98%
1999	2,200	+1.41%
2007	2,525	+1.74%
2012	2,965	+3.26%
2017	3,104	+0.92%
2023	3,187	+0.44%

Source: EHESS and INSEE (1968-2023)

== See also ==
- Communes of the Dordogne department
