= Coulounieix-Chamiers =

- Commune
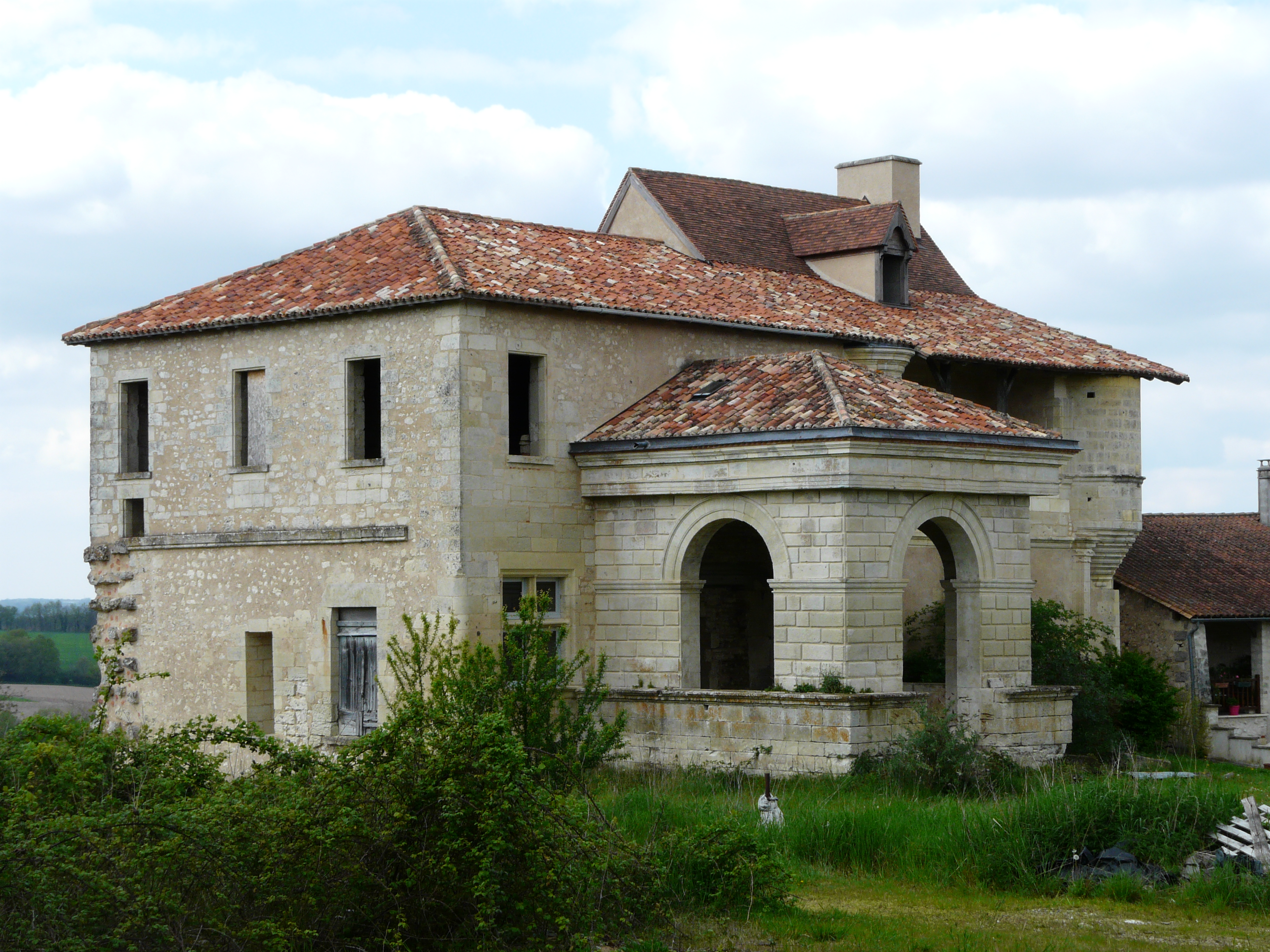
- Chateau of Rolphie
- Location of Coulounieix-Chamiers
- Location within France Location within Nouvelle-Aquitaine
- Coordinates: 45°11′14″N 0°41′32″E
- Country: France
- Region: Nouvelle-Aquitaine
- Department: Dordogne
- Arrondissement: Périgueux
- Canton: Coulounieix-Chamiers
- Intercommunality: Le Grand Périgueux

Government
  - Mayor (2020–2026): Thierry Cipierre
- Area^{1}: 21.70 km^{2} (8.38 sq mi)
- Elevation: 186 m (610 ft)
- Highest elevation: 222 m (728 ft)
- Lowest elevation: 78 m (256 ft)
- Population (2023): 7,832
  - Density: 360.9/km^{2} (934.8/sq mi)
- Time zone: UTC+01:00 (CET)
  - Summer (DST): UTC+02:00 (CEST)
- INSEE/Postal code: 24138 /24660
- ^{1} French Land Register data, which excludes lakes, ponds, glaciers > 1 km^{2} (0.386 sq mi or 247 acres) and river estuaries.

Coulounieix-Chamiers (French pronunciation: [kulunjɛ ʃamje]; Occitan: Colonhés e Champs Niers) is a commune in the Dordogne department in Nouvelle-Aquitaine in southwestern France. It is a suburb of Périgueux.

== Population ==
Historical population

Year	Pop.	±% p.a.
1800	298	—
1806	312	+0.77%
1821	328	+0.33%
1831	980	+11.57%
1836	980	+0.00%
1841	1,011	+0.62%
1846	960	−1.03%
1851	1,044	+1.69%
1856	1,045	+0.02%
1861	1,073	+0.53%
1866	1,186	+2.02%
1872	1,188	+0.03%
1876	1,237	+1.02%
1881	1,299	+0.98%
1886	1,333	+0.52%
1891	1,415	+1.20%
1896	1,403	−0.17%
1901	1,436	+0.47%

Year	Pop.	±% p.a.
1906	1,332	−1.49%
1911	1,418	+1.26%
1921	1,461	+0.30%
1926	1,610	+1.96%
1931	1,677	+0.82%
1936	1,719	+0.50%
1946	2,016	+1.61%
1954	2,709	+3.76%
1962	5,816	+10.02%
1968	7,421	+4.15%
1975	8,169	+1.38%
1982	8,250	+0.14%
1990	8,403	+0.23%
1999	8,102	−0.40%
2007	8,360	+0.39%
2012	8,130	−0.56%
2017	7,703	−1.07%
2023	7,832	+0.28%

Source: EHESS and INSEE (1968-2023)

== International relations ==
Coulounieix-Chamiers is twinned with:

- Venta de Baños, Spain
- Portlaoise, Ireland

== See also ==
- Communes of the Dordogne department
