= Saint-Astier, Dordogne =

Saint-Astier
- Commune
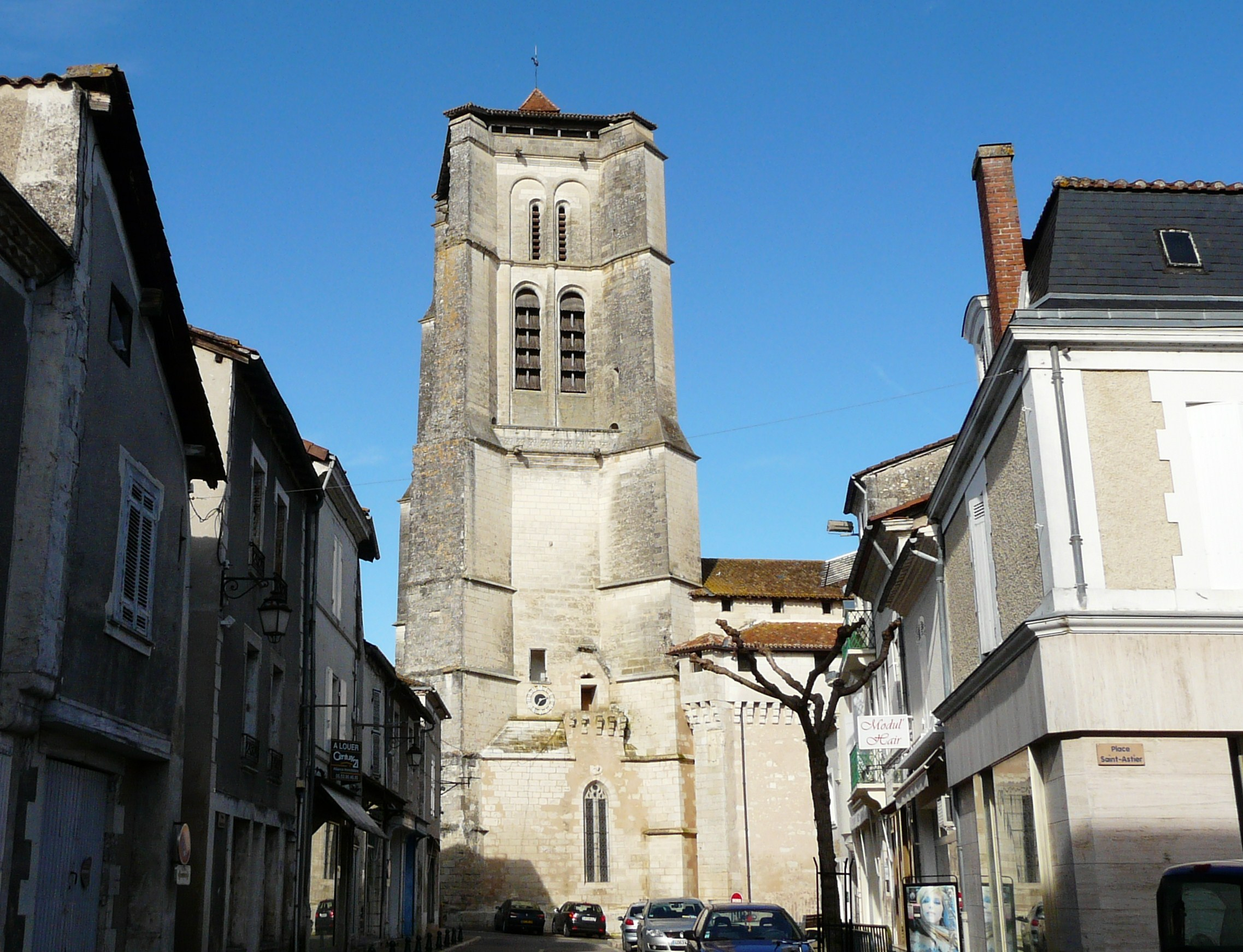
- Fortified church

- Coat of arms
- Location of Saint-Astier
- Location within France Location within Nouvelle-Aquitaine
- Coordinates: 45°08′47″N 0°31′45″E
- Country: France
- Region: Nouvelle-Aquitaine
- Department: Dordogne
- Arrondissement: Périgueux
- Canton: Saint-Astier

Government
  - Mayor (2020–2026): Élisabeth Marty
- Area^{1}: 34.25 km^{2} (13.22 sq mi)
- Elevation: 108 m (354 ft)
- Highest elevation: 222 m (728 ft)
- Lowest elevation: 58 m (190 ft)
- Population (2023): 5,376
  - Density: 157.0/km^{2} (406.5/sq mi)
- Time zone: UTC+01:00 (CET)
  - Summer (DST): UTC+02:00 (CEST)
- INSEE/Postal code: 24372 /24110
- ^{1} French Land Register data, which excludes lakes, ponds, glaciers > 1 km^{2} (0.386 sq mi or 247 acres) and river estuaries.

Saint-Astier (French pronunciation: [sɛ̃.t‿astje]; Limousin: Sench Astier) is a commune in the Dordogne department in Nouvelle-Aquitaine in southwestern France. It takes its name from a sixth-century saint. Saint-Astier station has rail connections to Bordeaux, Périgueux, Brive-la-Gaillarde and Limoges.

== Population ==
Historical population

Year	Pop.	±% p.a.
1793	2,216	—
1800	1,985	−1.56%
1806	2,263	+2.21%
1821	2,518	+0.71%
1831	2,546	+0.11%
1836	2,613	+0.52%
1841	2,561	−0.40%
1846	2,769	+1.57%
1851	2,826	+0.41%
1856	2,931	+0.73%
1861	2,879	−0.36%
1866	2,913	+0.24%
1872	2,891	−0.13%
1876	2,961	+0.60%
1881	3,280	+2.07%
1886	3,581	+1.77%
1891	3,201	−2.22%
1896	3,073	−0.81%
1901	2,942	−0.87%

Year	Pop.	±% p.a.
1906	3,042	+0.67%
1911	3,204	+1.04%
1921	2,953	−0.81%
1926	3,053	+0.67%
1931	3,067	+0.09%
1936	3,073	+0.04%
1946	3,415	+1.06%
1954	3,933	+1.78%
1962	4,256	+0.99%
1968	4,052	−0.82%
1975	4,093	+0.14%
1982	4,416	+1.09%
1990	4,780	+0.99%
1999	5,098	+0.72%
2007	5,329	+0.56%
2012	5,472	+0.53%
2017	5,492	+0.07%
2023	5,376	−0.36%

Source: EHESS and INSEE (1968-2023)

== Notable people ==
Kendji Girac, singer

== See also ==
- Communes of the Dordogne department
