= Lisle, Dordogne =

Lisle
- Commune
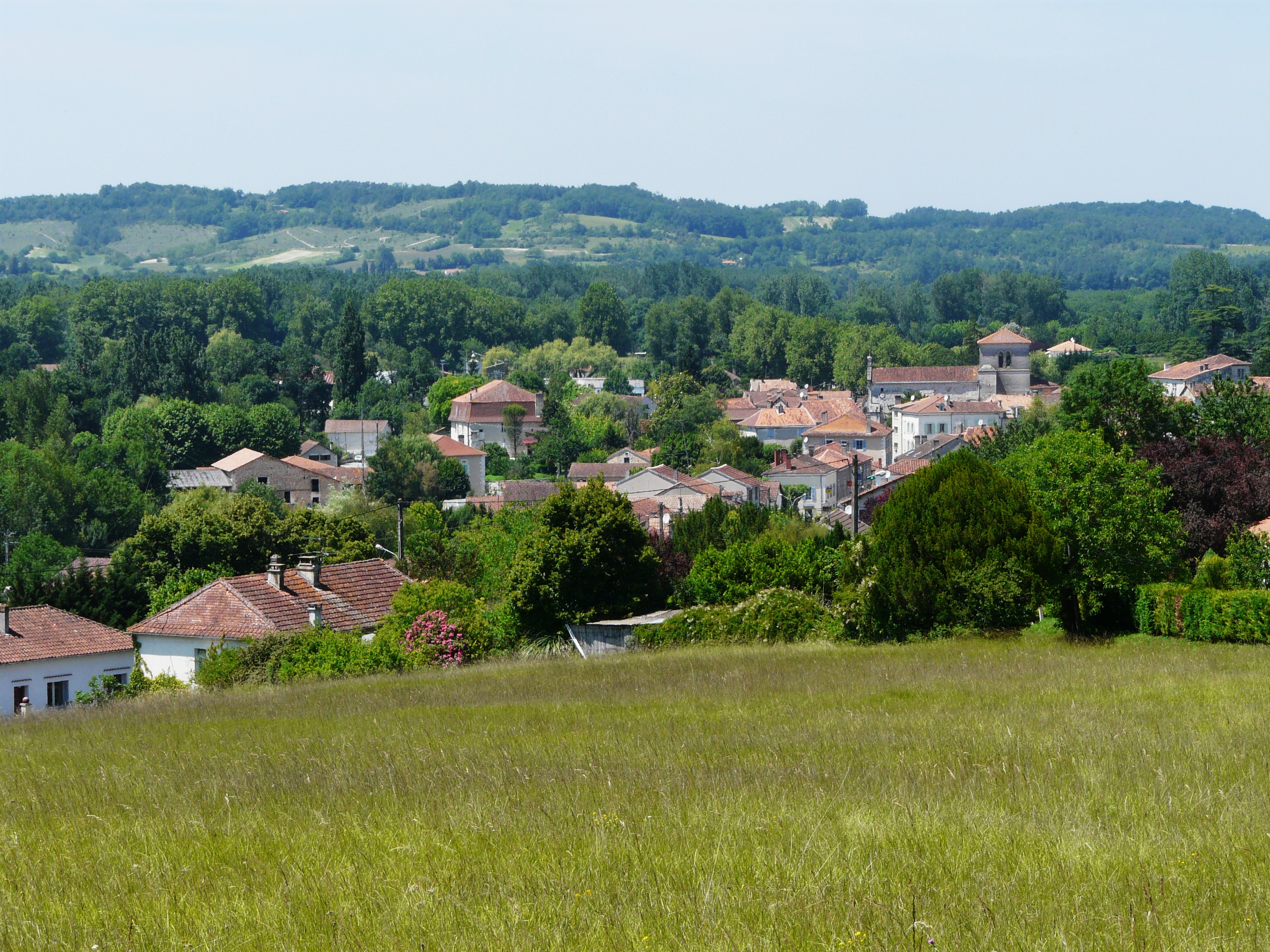
- A general view of Lisle

- Coat of arms
- Location of Lisle
- Location within France Location within Nouvelle-Aquitaine
- Coordinates: 45°16′44″N 0°32′58″E
- Country: France
- Region: Nouvelle-Aquitaine
- Department: Dordogne
- Arrondissement: Périgueux
- Canton: Brantôme en Périgord

Government
  - Mayor (2020–2026): Joël Constant
- Area^{1}: 17.97 km^{2} (6.94 sq mi)
- Highest elevation: 217 m (712 ft)
- Lowest elevation: 76 m (249 ft)
- Population (2023): 924
  - Density: 51.4/km^{2} (133/sq mi)
- Time zone: UTC+01:00 (CET)
  - Summer (DST): UTC+02:00 (CEST)
- INSEE/Postal code: 24243 /24350
- ^{1} French Land Register data, which excludes lakes, ponds, glaciers > 1 km^{2} (0.386 sq mi or 247 acres) and river estuaries.

Lisle (French pronunciation: [lil]; Occitan: L'Esla) is a commune in the Dordogne department in Nouvelle-Aquitaine in southwestern France.

== History ==
In October 1537, the town was badly damaged by a company of Gascon recruits under Joachim de Montluc, brother of the more famous Blaise de Montluc. Unpaid and unfed, the troops had demanded "free quarter", which was refused.

== Population ==
Historical population
Year	Pop.	±% p.a.
1968	990	—
1975	934	−0.83%
1982	917	−0.26%
1990	946	+0.39%
1999	909	−0.44%
2007	922	+0.18%
2012	907	−0.33%
2017	859	−1.08%
2023	924	+1.22%
Source: INSEE

== Amenities ==
Lisle has a kindergarten and a primary school, a church, a square in front of the town hall and another called La Place des Banquettes. It is well-served commercially with a bakery, a bar/bistrot, a bar/hotel/restaurant, a butchers, a pharmacy, a post office, a beauticians, 2 hairdressers, mini supermarket, Credit Agricole cashpoint and a restaurant on the banks of the Dronne river, Le Moulin du Pont. There is also a health centre with 2 doctors, a dentist, physiotherapist, podiatrist and other medical practitioners.

== Events ==
It is quite an active village with the Comité des Fêtes and Amicale Laïque organising events throughout the year including the four-day Fête de la St Roch the weekend contains or just after the 15th of August.

== See also ==
- Communes of the Dordogne department

== Sources ==
- Courteault, Paul (1908). Blaise de Montluc; Historien (in French). Bibliothèque Méridionale.
