= Chancelade =

- Commune
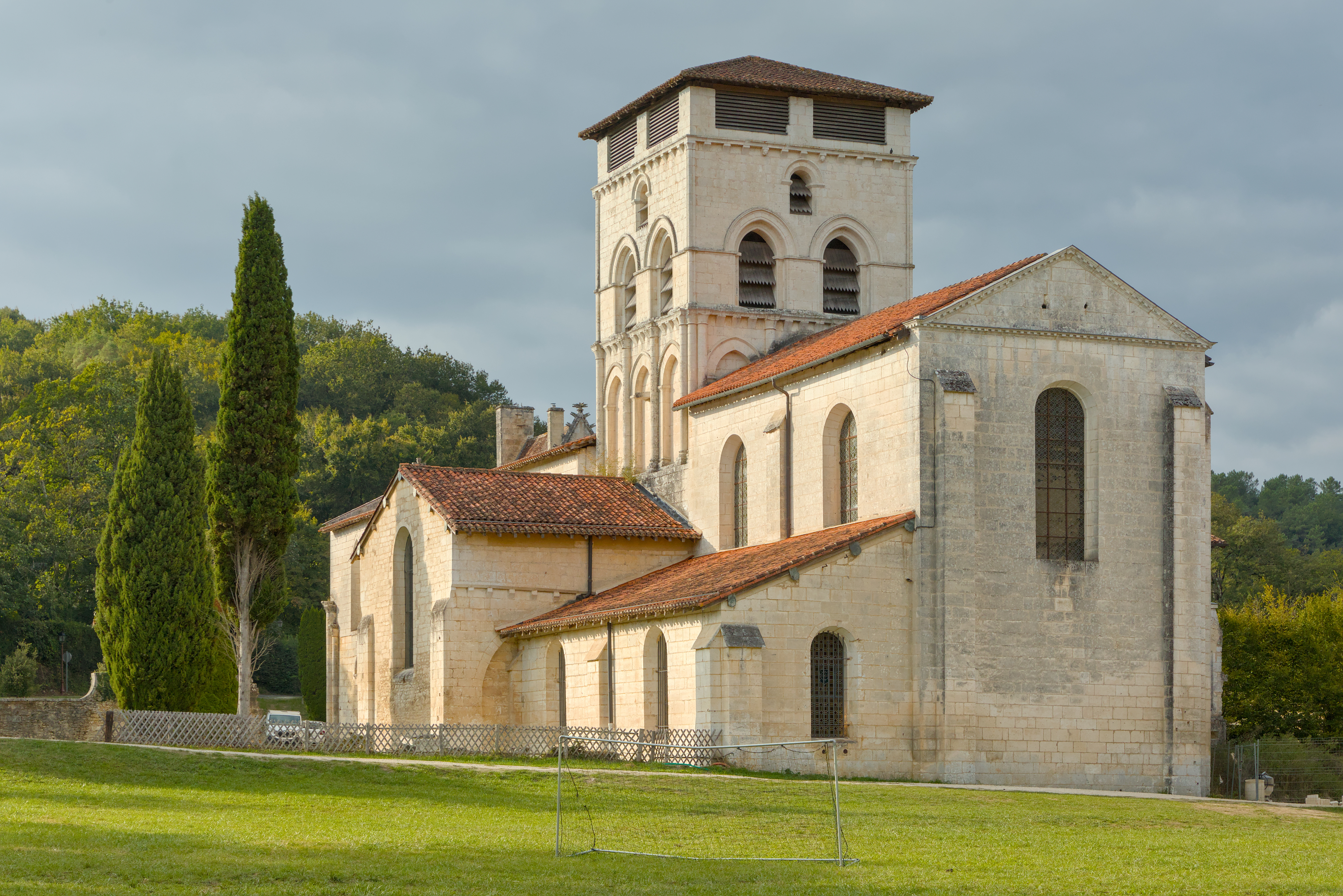
- The abbey in Chancelade
- Location of Chancelade
- Location within France Location within Nouvelle-Aquitaine
- Coordinates: 45°12′23″N 0°39′58″E
- Country: France
- Region: Nouvelle-Aquitaine
- Department: Dordogne
- Arrondissement: Périgueux
- Canton: Coulounieix-Chamiers
- Intercommunality: Le Grand Périgueux

Government
  - Mayor (2020–2026): Pascal Serre
- Area^{1}: 16.23 km^{2} (6.27 sq mi)
- Highest elevation: 198 m (650 ft)
- Lowest elevation: 73 m (240 ft)
- Population (2023): 4,468
  - Density: 275.3/km^{2} (713.0/sq mi)
- Time zone: UTC+01:00 (CET)
  - Summer (DST): UTC+02:00 (CEST)
- INSEE/Postal code: 24102 /24650
- ^{1} French Land Register data, which excludes lakes, ponds, glaciers > 1 km^{2} (0.386 sq mi or 247 acres) and river estuaries.

Chancelade (French pronunciation: [ʃɑ̃slad]; Occitan: Chancelada) is a commune in the Dordogne department in Nouvelle-Aquitaine in southwestern France. The village is the site of Chancelade Abbey.

The so-called "Chancelade man" was found in the nearby Raymonden rock shelter in 1888, the skeleton of an approximately 60-year-old male who was buried there in the Magdalenian, roughly 15,000 years ago.

== Population ==
Historical population

Year	Pop.	±% p.a.
1793	906	—
1800	679	−4.04%
1806	703	+0.58%
1821	948	+2.01%
1831	1,093	+1.43%
1836	1,026	−1.26%
1841	1,001	−0.49%
1846	1,141	+2.65%
1851	1,116	−0.44%
1856	1,164	+0.85%
1861	1,181	+0.29%
1866	1,236	+0.91%
1872	1,096	−1.98%
1876	1,227	+2.86%
1881	1,417	+2.92%
1886	1,384	−0.47%
1891	1,349	−0.51%
1896	1,245	−1.59%
1901	1,267	+0.35%

Year	Pop.	±% p.a.
1906	1,092	−2.93%
1911	1,156	+1.15%
1921	1,117	−0.34%
1926	1,164	+0.83%
1931	1,095	−1.21%
1936	1,168	+1.30%
1946	1,271	+0.85%
1954	1,445	+1.62%
1962	1,780	+2.64%
1968	2,002	+1.98%
1975	2,420	+2.75%
1982	3,297	+4.52%
1990	3,718	+1.51%
1999	3,865	+0.43%
2007	4,150	+0.89%
2012	4,275	+0.60%
2017	4,262	−0.06%
2023	4,468	+0.79%

Source: EHESS and INSEE (1968-2023)

== See also ==
- Communes of the Dordogne department
