= Château de Mauriac =

Château de Mauriac may refer to:

- Château de Mauriac (Douzillac)
- Château de Mauriac (Senouillac)
