= Château de Mauriac (Douzillac) =

Historic building in Dordogne, France

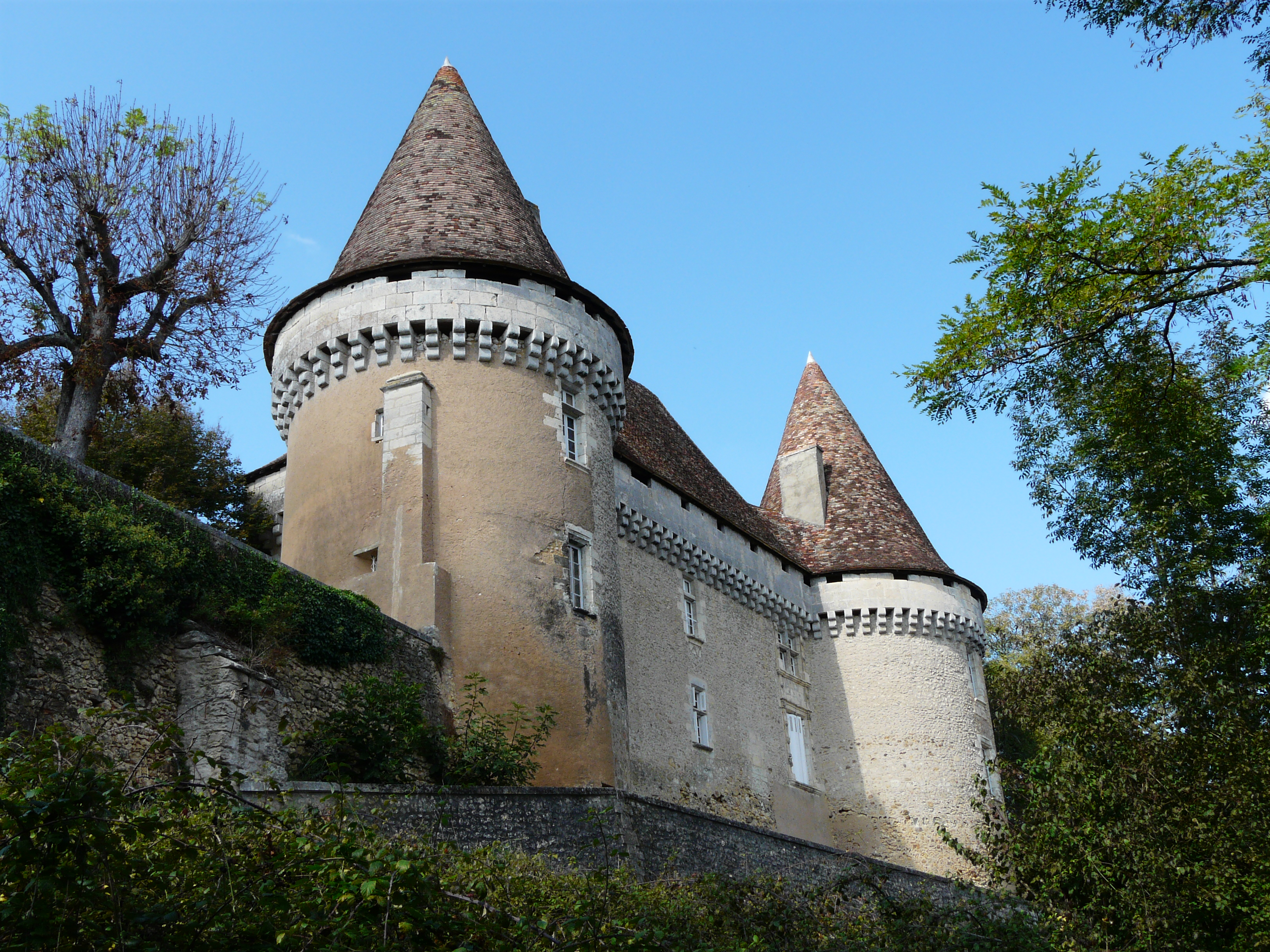
- View from the south-east

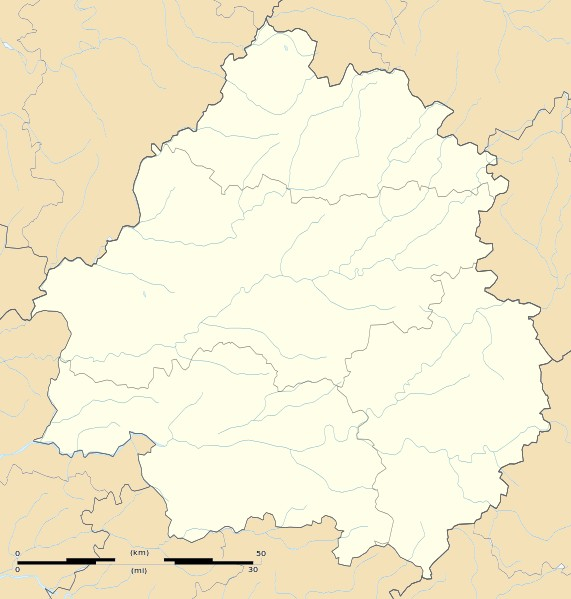
- Location within Dordogne

General information
- Status: Private dwelling
- Type: château
- Architectural style: Renaissance
- Location: Douzillac, Dordogne, France
- Coordinates: 45°05′20″N 0°25′56″E
- Construction started: 15th century
- Completed: 16th century

Monument historique
- Designated: 1948

Monument historique
- Designated: 2016

The Château de Mauriac is a château in Dordogne, Nouvelle-Aquitaine, France. It is listed as a Monument historique.

== Characteristics ==
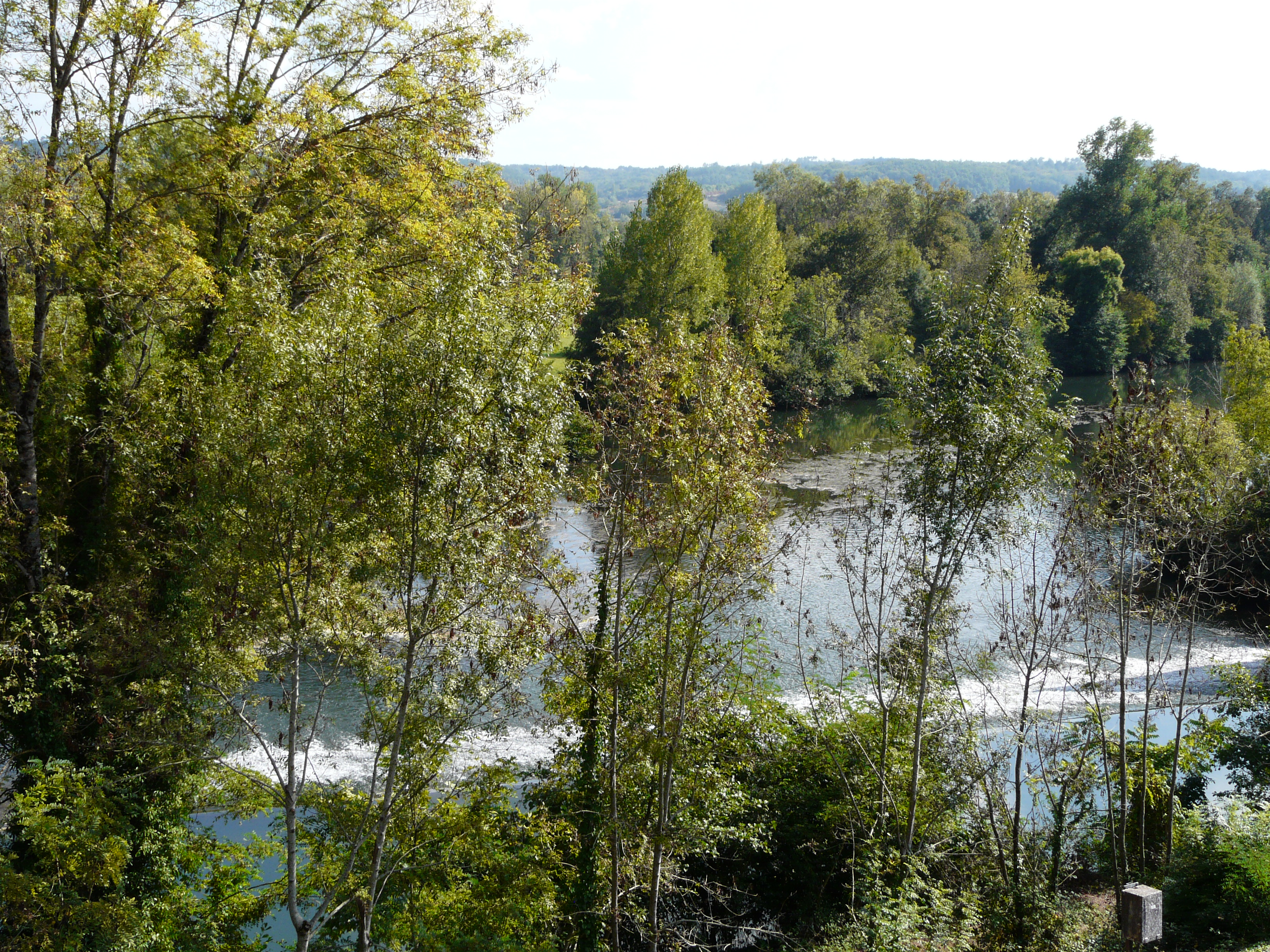
View over the River Isle, from the terrace

The Château de Mauriac is in the department of the Dordogne, 2 kilometres (1.2 mi) to the north-west of the town of Douzillac. It overlooks the railway line from Coutras to Tulle and the River Isle, below the Mauriac dam. The dam used to drive a mill providing energy to a furniture factory, now replaced by a small hydroelectric power plant. It is private property, but the gardens and terrace are open to visitors.

The château is located on the eastern border of a park, bounded by two towers at the south-west and north-west.

Access to the castle is via a partly-ruined gatehouse.

The chateau's appearance from the south-east is that of a lodge flanked by two wide round towers, all with machicolation.

== History ==
The château itself was built in the 15th and 16th centuries. It replaced a mediaeval structure, which itself replaced one from the Gallo-Roman period.

On his return from Italy, Michel de Montaigne made a stop at the château in 1581.

The château was given the title of a monument historique on 12 October 1948, and the entire site on 10 February 2016.

== Gallery ==
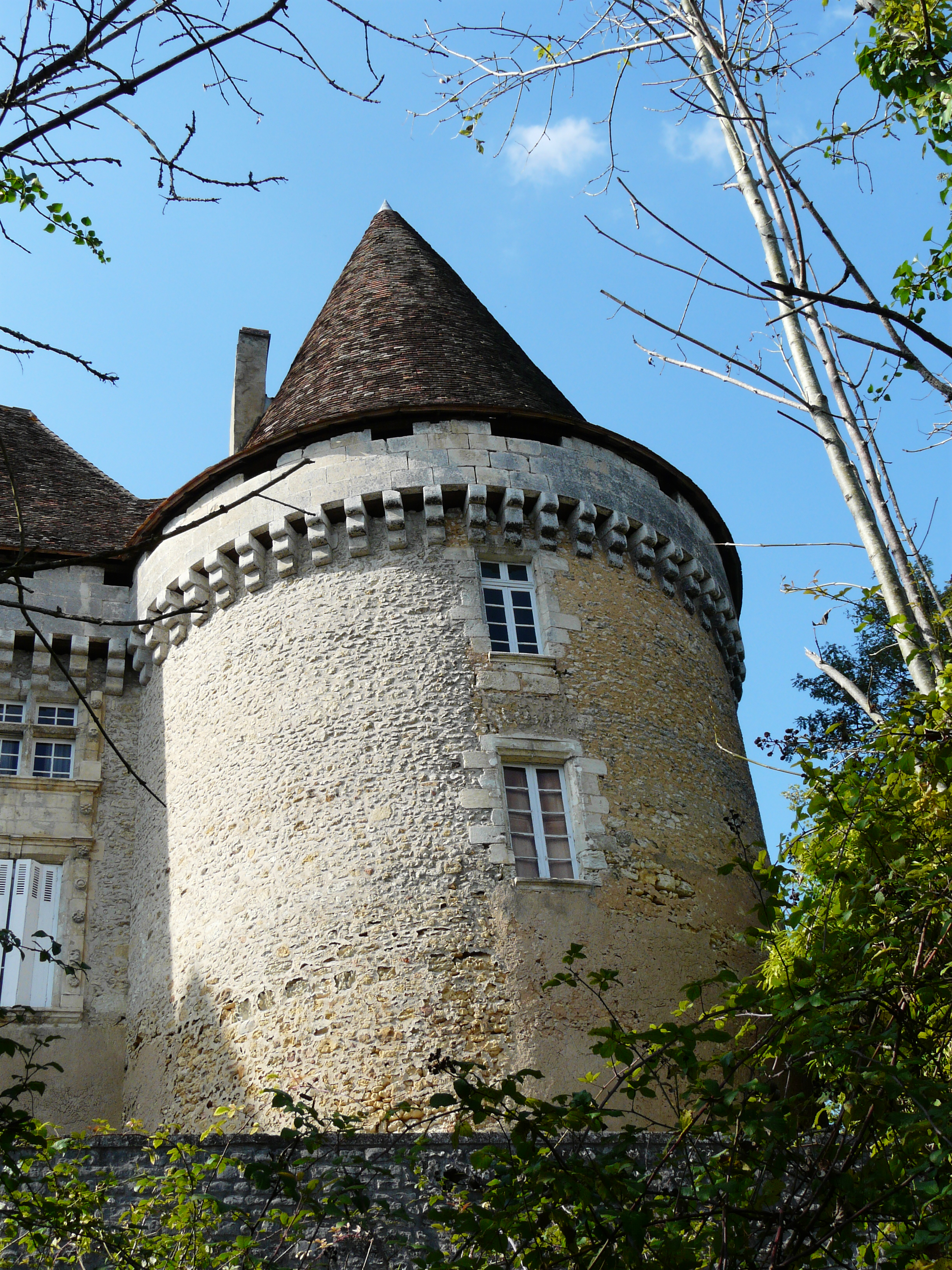
North-east tower

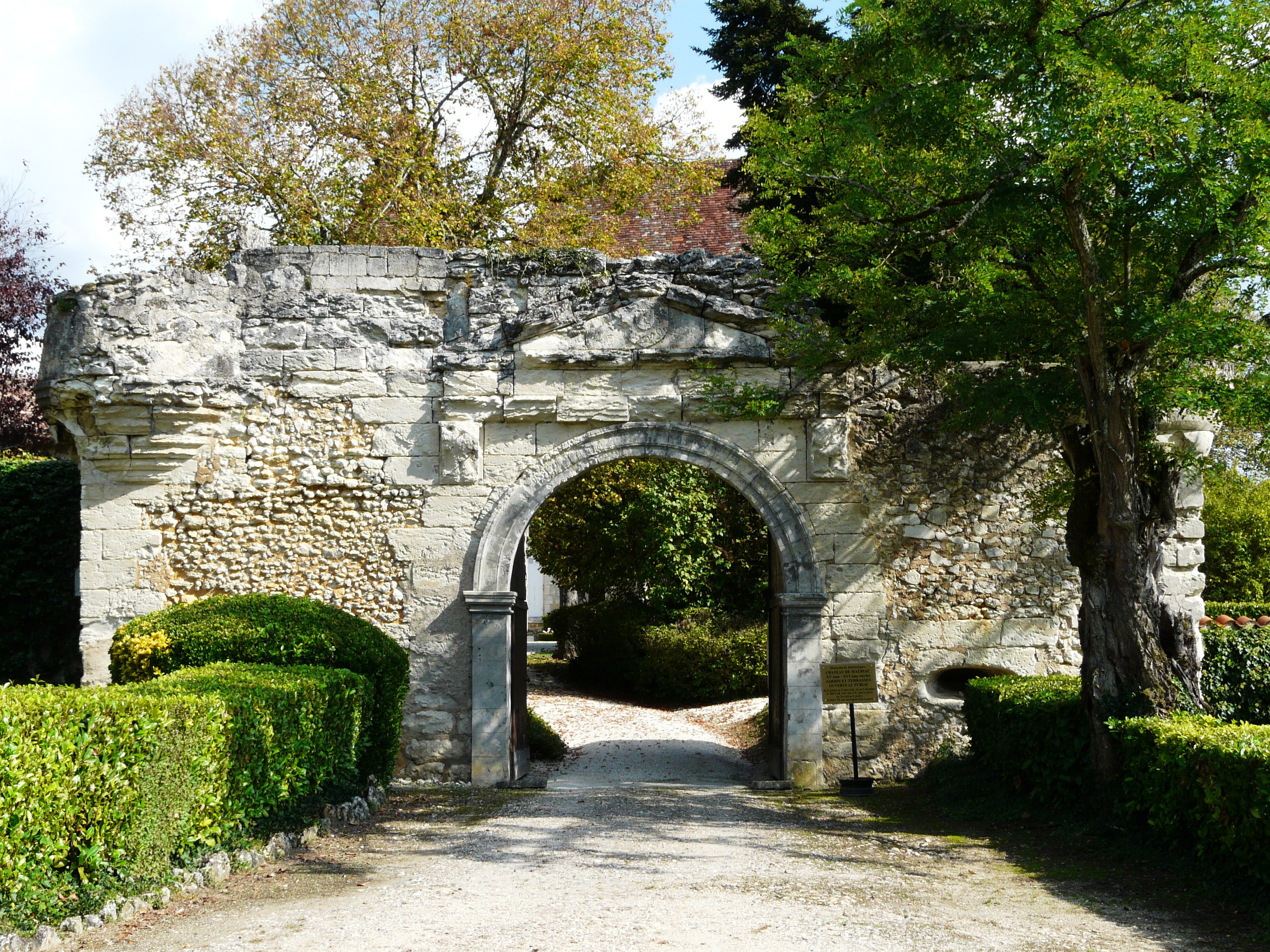
Gatehouse

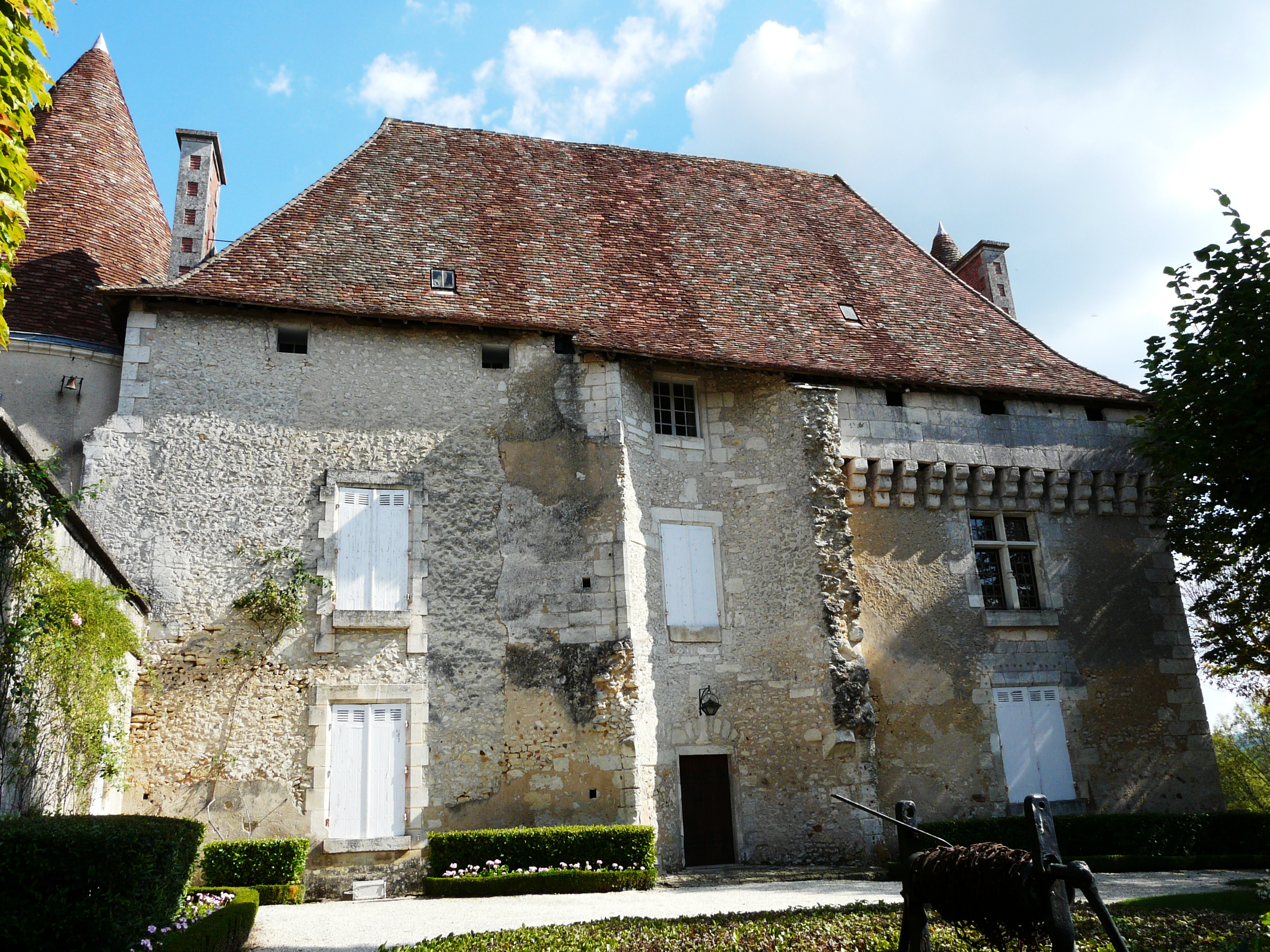
Lodge

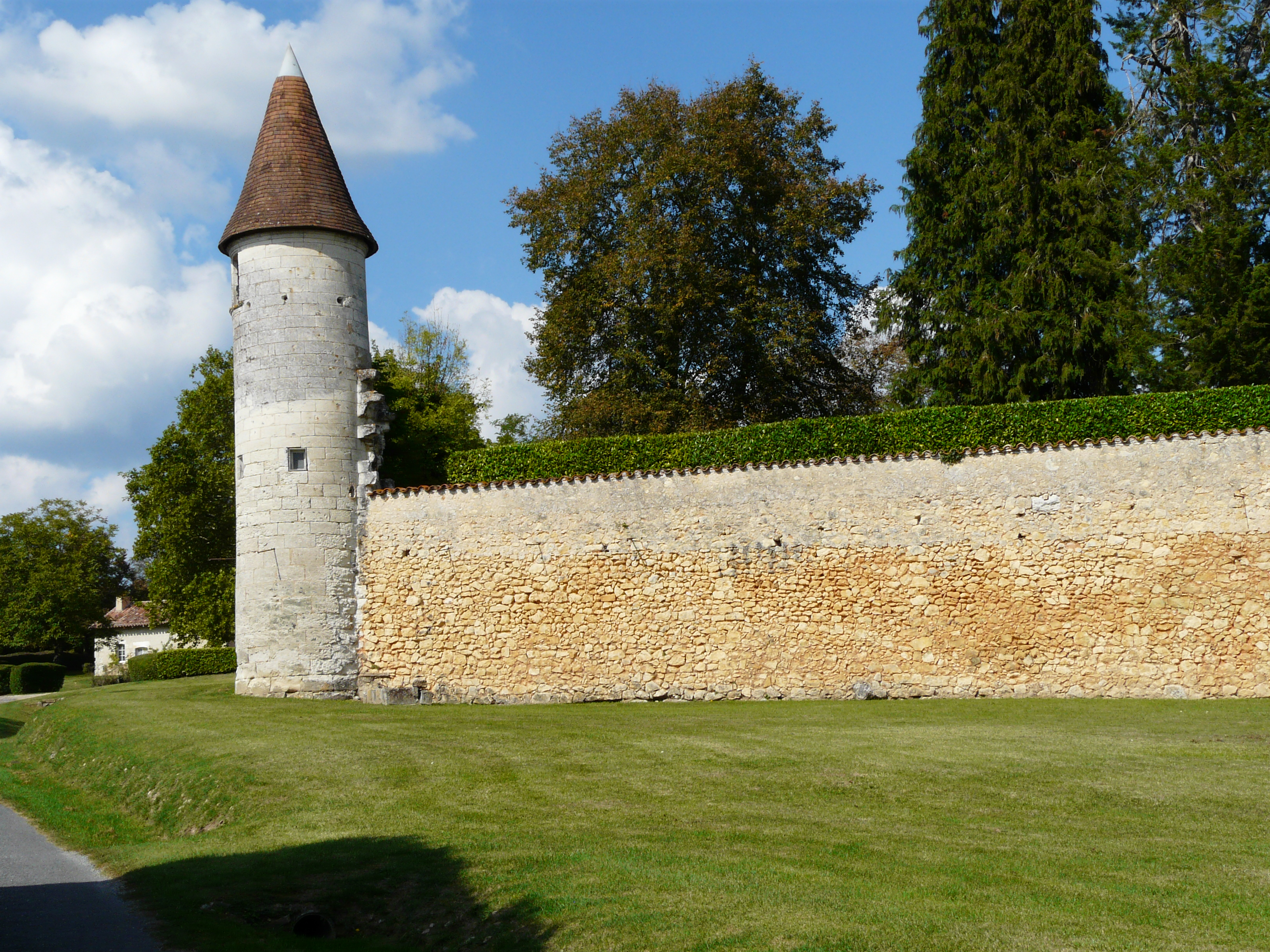
Tower from the south-west
