= Château des Chauveaux =

Château in Dordogne, Aquitaine, France

Coordinates: 45°05′09″N 0°25′33″E

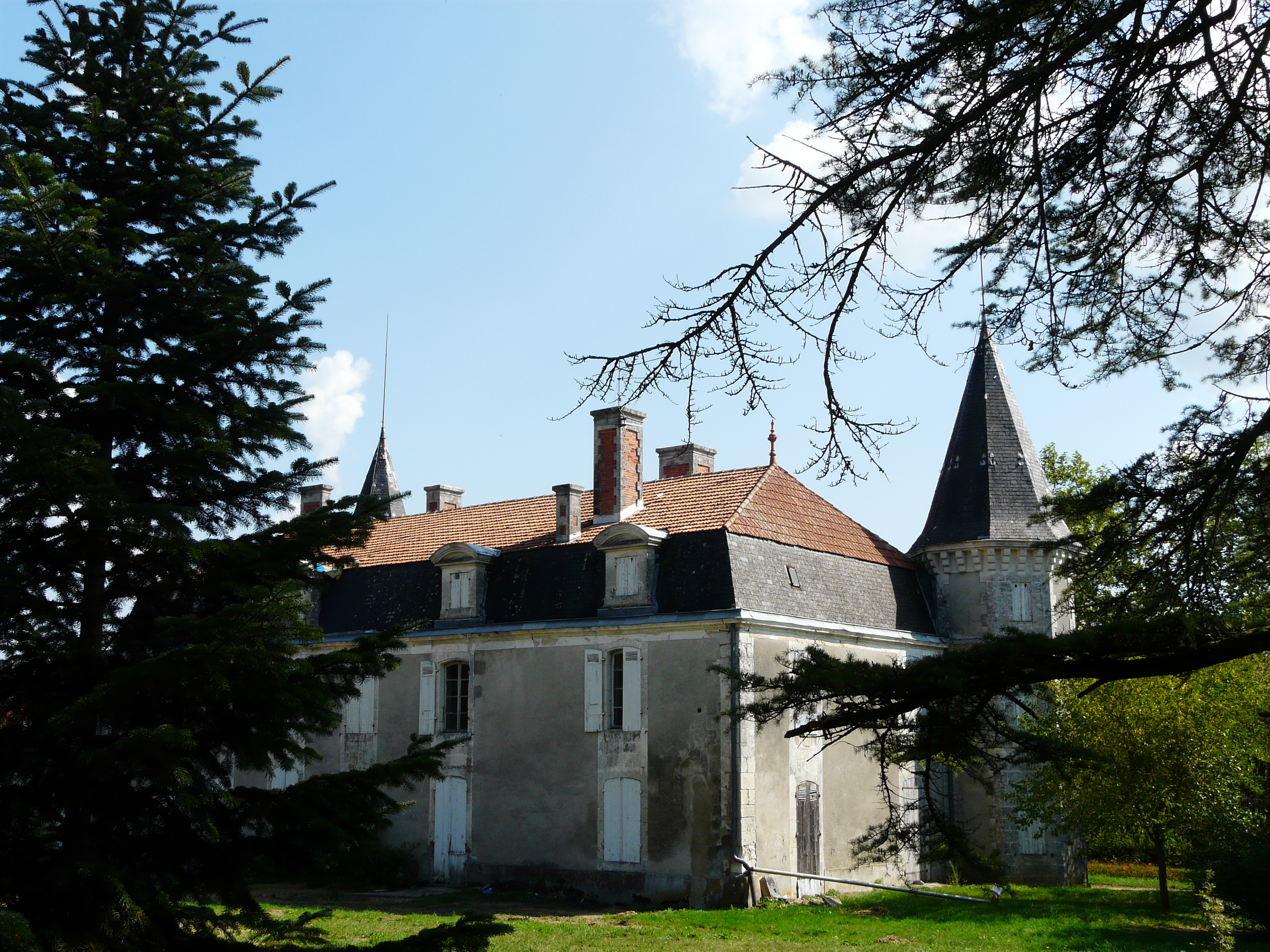

The Château des Chauveaux is a château in Douzillac, Dordogne, Aquitaine, France.
