= Château de Mauriac (Senouillac) =

Castle in Senouillac, France

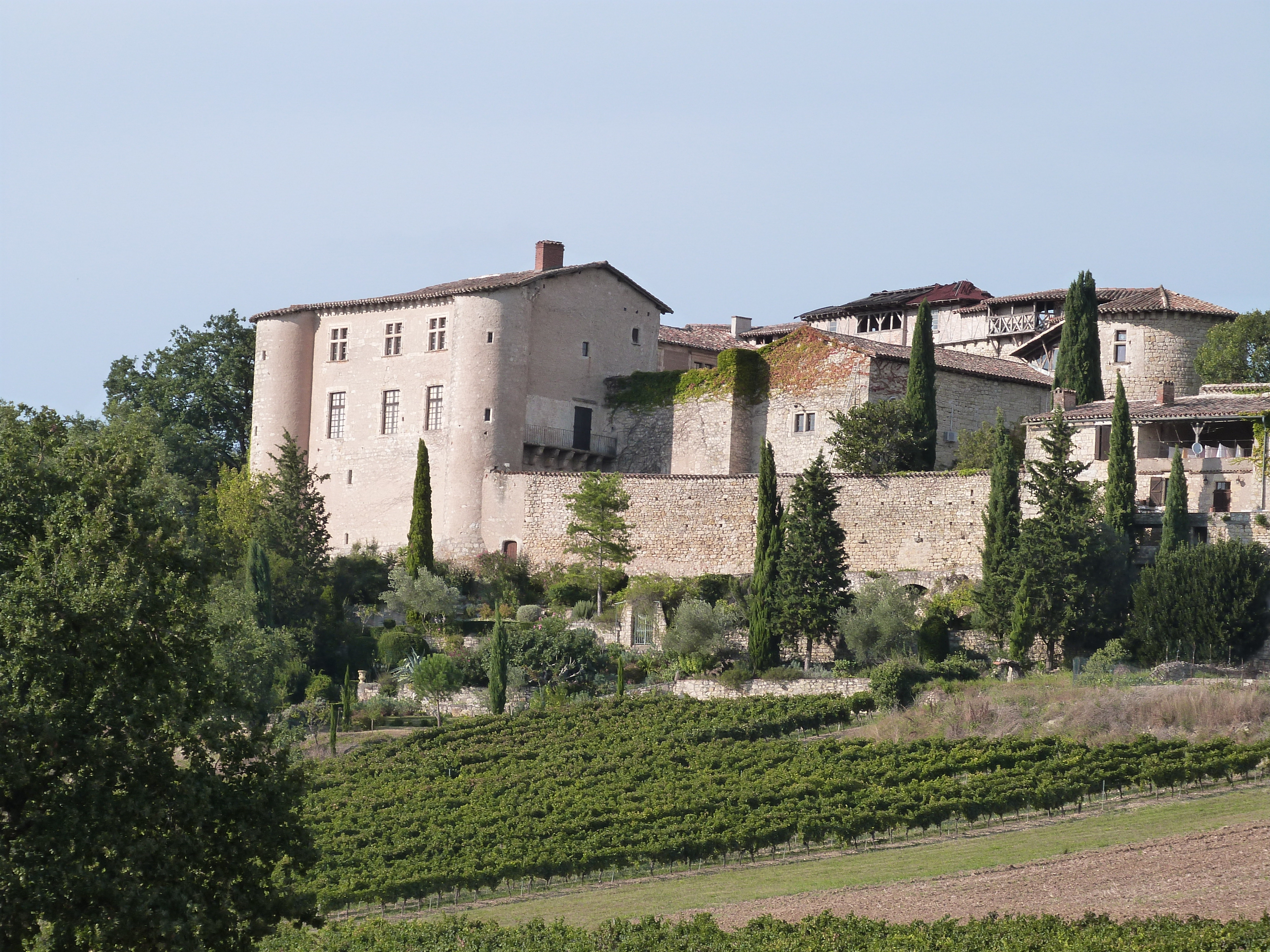
Overall view of the Château de Mauriac

The Château de Mauriac is a French chateau established near the town of Senouillac in the Tarn, in the Occitanie region. The chateau is located in the heart of the Gaillac vineyards.

== History ==
The castle was built in the 13th century by Guiriaudus de Mauricius. The construction of this Templar castle continued into the 14th century, it then was embellished by the enrichment of its owners thanks to the cultivation of dyers pastel or more commonly woad (Isatis tinctoria) which gave a royal blue color. The inner courtyard has an area of 400 m^{2} and includes eight mullioned windows

During the Wars of Religion in the 16th century, the castle walkway along the wall was partially destroyed by Catholics because the owner, Bertrand de Rabastens was a Protestant.

== In the 21st century ==
Since the 1960s, it has belonged to the painter Bernard Bistes, who was responsible for its renovation. The artist uses the rooms to exhibit his paintings. This military fortress, listed among the fifty most beautiful private residences in France, has 5 guest rooms with four-poster beds.

The castle has been listed as a Historic Monument since 1972.
