= Douzillac =

- Commune
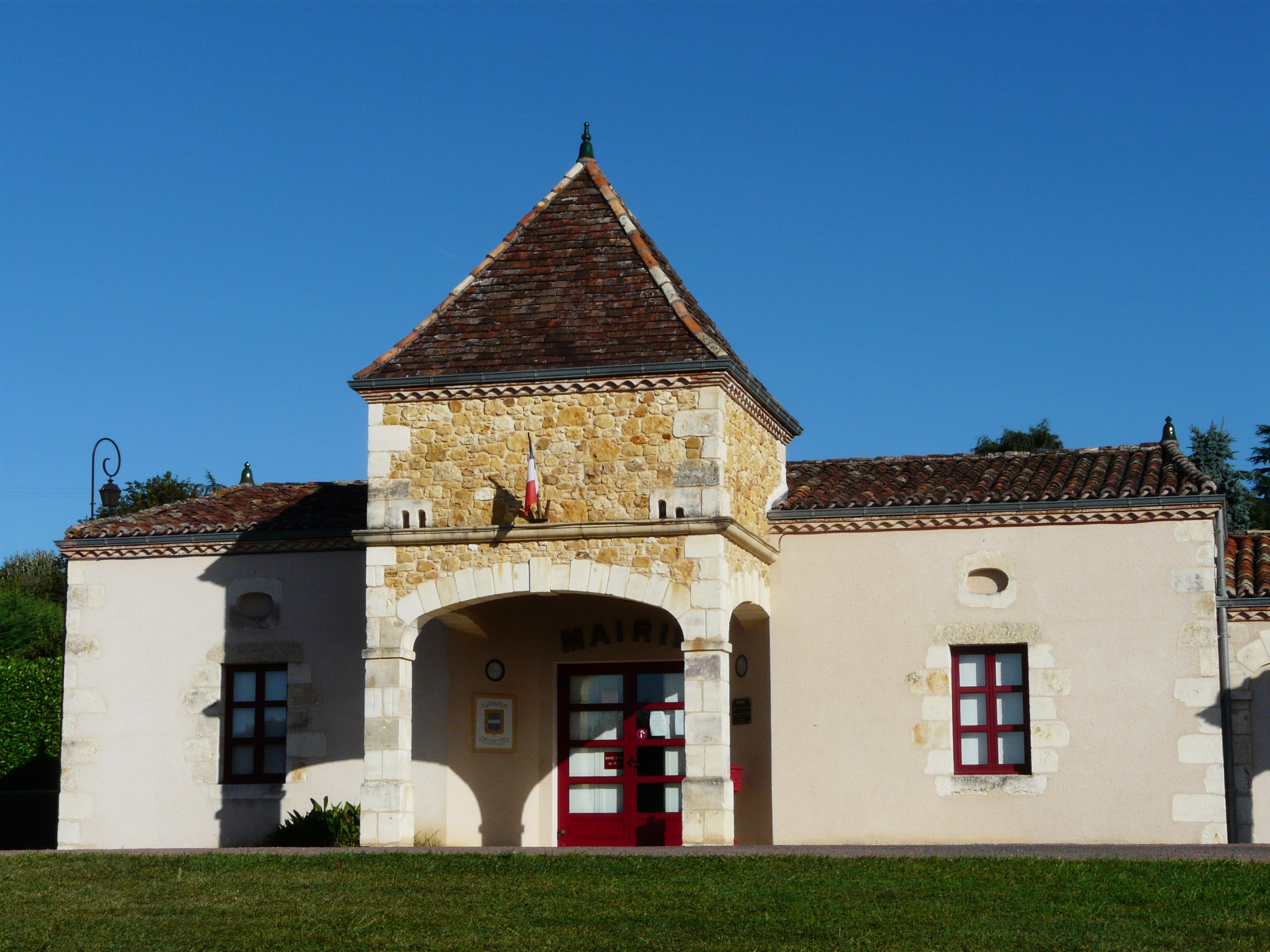
- The town hall in Douzillac

- Coat of arms
- Location of Douzillac
- Location within France Location within Nouvelle-Aquitaine
- Coordinates: 45°05′09″N 0°25′10″E
- Country: France
- Region: Nouvelle-Aquitaine
- Department: Dordogne
- Arrondissement: Périgueux
- Canton: Vallée de l'Isle

Government
  - Mayor (2020–2026): Dominique Mazière
- Area^{1}: 17.17 km^{2} (6.63 sq mi)
- Elevation: 60 m (200 ft)
- Highest elevation: 167 m (548 ft)
- Lowest elevation: 48 m (157 ft)
- Population (2023): 845
  - Density: 49.2/km^{2} (127/sq mi)
- Time zone: UTC+01:00 (CET)
  - Summer (DST): UTC+02:00 (CEST)
- INSEE/Postal code: 24157 /24190
- ^{1} French Land Register data, which excludes lakes, ponds, glaciers > 1 km^{2} (0.386 sq mi or 247 acres) and river estuaries.

Douzillac (French pronunciation: [duzijak]; Occitan: Dosilhac) is a commune in the Dordogne department in Nouvelle-Aquitaine in southwestern France.

== Population ==
Historical population
Year	Pop.	±% p.a.
1968	716	—
1975	679	−0.76%
1982	604	−1.66%
1990	628	+0.49%
1999	710	+1.37%
2007	794	+1.41%
2012	803	+0.23%
2017	795	−0.20%
2023	845	+1.02%
Source: INSEE

== See also ==
- Communes of the Dordogne department
- Château des Chauveaux
