= TER Limousin =

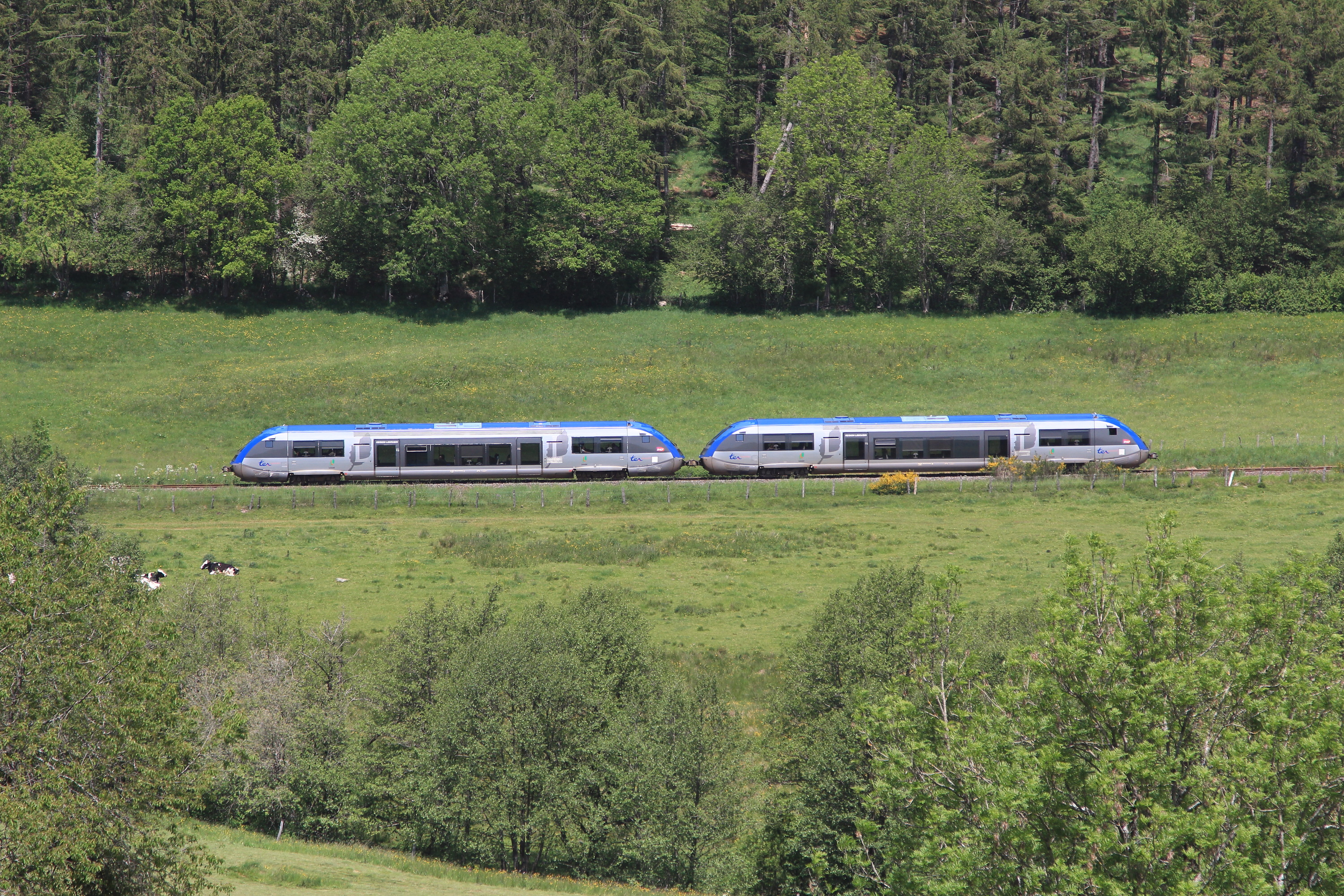
- Autorail X 73500 serving the connection between Limoges and Clermont-Ferrand.

Overview
- Daily ridership: 6,000
- Website: http://www.sncf.com/en/trains/ter

Technical
- Track gauge: 1,435 mm (4 ft 8 1/2 in) standard gauge

TER Limousin was the regional rail network serving Limousin région of southwest-central France. In 2017, it was merged with TER Aquitaine and TER Poitou-Charentes to form the new TER Nouvelle-Aquitaine.

== Network ==
=== By train ===
Line	Route	Frequency	Notes
1	Vierzon ... Issoudun ... Châteauroux ... La Souterraine ... Limoges	see TER Centre-Val de Loire line 1.3	
2	Poitiers ... Montmorillon ... Bellac ... Limoges		
3	Angoulême ... Chabanais ... Saint-Junien ... Limoges		
4	Limoges-Bénédictins – l'Aiguille† – Nexon† – Lafarge† – Bussière-Galant† – La Coquille† – Thiviers – Négrondes† – Agonac† – Château-l'Évêque† – Périgueux	12× per day, some trains continue to Bordeaux (see TER Aquitaine line 24)	
5	Limoges-Bénédictins – l'Aiguille† – Nexon – La Meyze† – Saint-Yrieix-la-Perche – Coussac-Bonneval – Lubersac† – Pompadour – Vignols-Saint-Solve† – Objat – Saint-Aulaire† – Le Burg† – Varetz – Brive-la-Gaillarde	2× per day Limoges–Brive, 5× per day Limoges–Saint-Yrieix, 2× per day Saint-Yrieix–Brive, 2× per day Pompadour–Brive, 2× per day Objat–Brive	
6	Limoges-Bénédictins – Solignac-Le Vigen† – Pierre-Buffière† – Magnac-Vicq† – Saint-Germain-les-Belles† – La Porcherie† – Masseret† – Uzerche – Vigeois – Allassac – Brive-la-Gaillarde	6× per day, 2 trains continue to Toulouse (see TER Midi-Pyrénées line 14)	
8	Limoges-Bénédictins – Le Palais† – Saint-Priest-Taurion† – Brignac† – Saint-Léonard-de-Noblat – Saint-Denis-des-Murs† – Châteauneuf-Bujaleuf† – Eymoutiers-Vassivière – Lacelle – Bugeat – Pérols† – Barsanges† – Jassonneix – Meymac – Ussel – Eygurande-Merlines – Laqueuille – Volvic – Royat-Chamalières – Clermont-Ferrand	1× per day Limoges–Clermont-Ferrand, 2× per day Limoges–Ussel, 3× per day Limoges–Eymoutiers	
10	Montluçon ... Guéret ... Limoges		
11	Brive-la-Gaillarde – Aubazine-Saint-Hilaire – Cornil† – Tulle – Corrèze† – Montaignac-Saint-Hippolyte† – Égletons – Meymac – Ussel – Aix-La Marsalouse – Eygurande-Merlines – Laqueuille – Volvic – Royat-Chamalières – Clermont-La Rotonde – Clermont-Ferrand	1× per day Brive–Clermont-Ferrand, 3× per day Brive–Ussel, 1× per day Brive–Égletons, 11× per day Brive–Tulle, 1× per day Ussel–Clermont-Ferrand	
15	Felletin ... Aubusson ... Guéret		
† Not all trains call at this station

=== By bus ===
- Limoges – Uzerche – Tulle
- Limoges – Aubusson – Felletin
- Ussel – Felletin
- Ussel – Auzances – Montluçon
- Montluçon – Aubusson – Felletin
- La Souterraine – Guéret – Aubusson – Felletin

== Rolling stock ==
=== Multiple units ===
- SNCF Class Z 7300
- SNCF Class X 2200
- SNCF Class X 2800
- SNCF Class X 72500
- SNCF Class X 73500
- SNCF Class B 81500

=== Buses ===
- Renault Tracer
- Renault Arès
- Irisbus Axer
- Irisbus Midys
- Indcar Mago 2
- Van Hool T 815 Alicron
- Setra S 315 GT

=== External links ===
- TER Limousin
