= Varetz =

- Commune
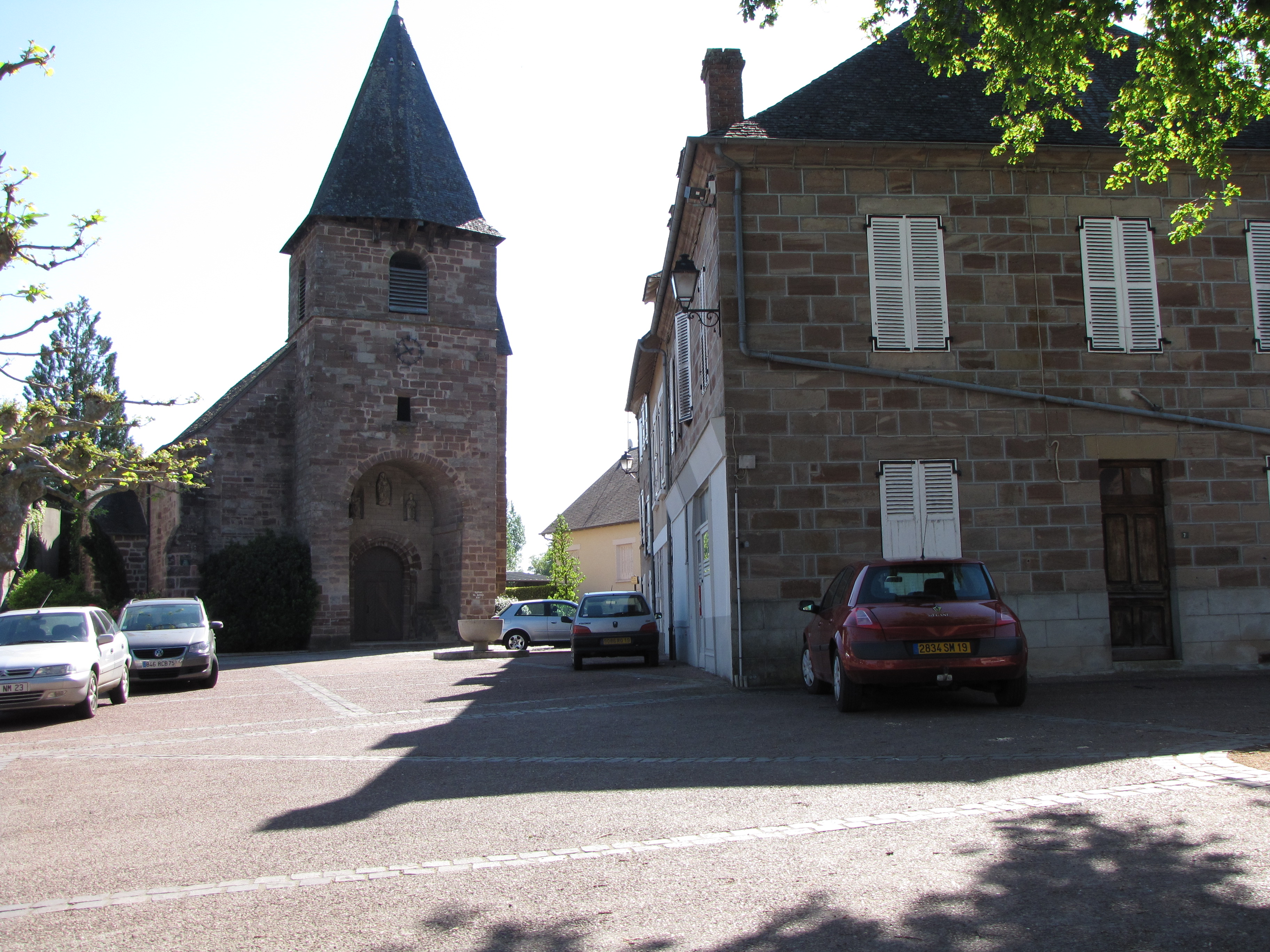
- The church in Varetz

- Coat of arms
- Location of Varetz
- Location within France Location within Nouvelle-Aquitaine
- Coordinates: 45°11′41″N 1°27′05″E
- Country: France
- Region: Nouvelle-Aquitaine
- Department: Corrèze
- Arrondissement: Brive-la-Gaillarde
- Canton: Malemort
- Intercommunality: CA Bassin de Brive

Government
  - Mayor (2020–2026): Béatrice Londeix
- Area^{1}: 20.38 km^{2} (7.87 sq mi)
- Elevation: 109 m (358 ft)
- Highest elevation: 262 m (860 ft)
- Lowest elevation: 90 m (300 ft)
- Population (2023): 2,409
  - Density: 118.2/km^{2} (306.1/sq mi)
- Time zone: UTC+01:00 (CET)
  - Summer (DST): UTC+02:00 (CEST)
- INSEE/Postal code: 19278 /19240
- ^{1} French Land Register data, which excludes lakes, ponds, glaciers > 1 km^{2} (0.386 sq mi or 247 acres) and river estuaries.

Varetz (French pronunciation: [vaʁɛs] or [vaʁɛts]; Occitan: Vares) is a commune in the Corrèze department in central France.

It lies in the urban area of Brive-la-Gaillarde between Objat and Brive-la-Gaillarde at the confluence of the Vézère and the Correze. Varetz station and Le Burg station have rail connections to Brive-la-Gaillarde, Saint-Yrieix and Limoges.

== Population ==
Historical population
Year	Pop.	±% p.a.
1968	1,123	—
1975	1,278	+1.86%
1982	1,643	+3.65%
1990	1,851	+1.50%
1999	1,918	+0.40%
2007	2,109	+1.19%
2012	2,297	+1.72%
2017	2,425	+1.09%
2023	2,409	−0.11%
Source: INSEE

== See also ==
- Communes of the Corrèze department
