= Nexon, Haute-Vienne =

Nexon
- Commune
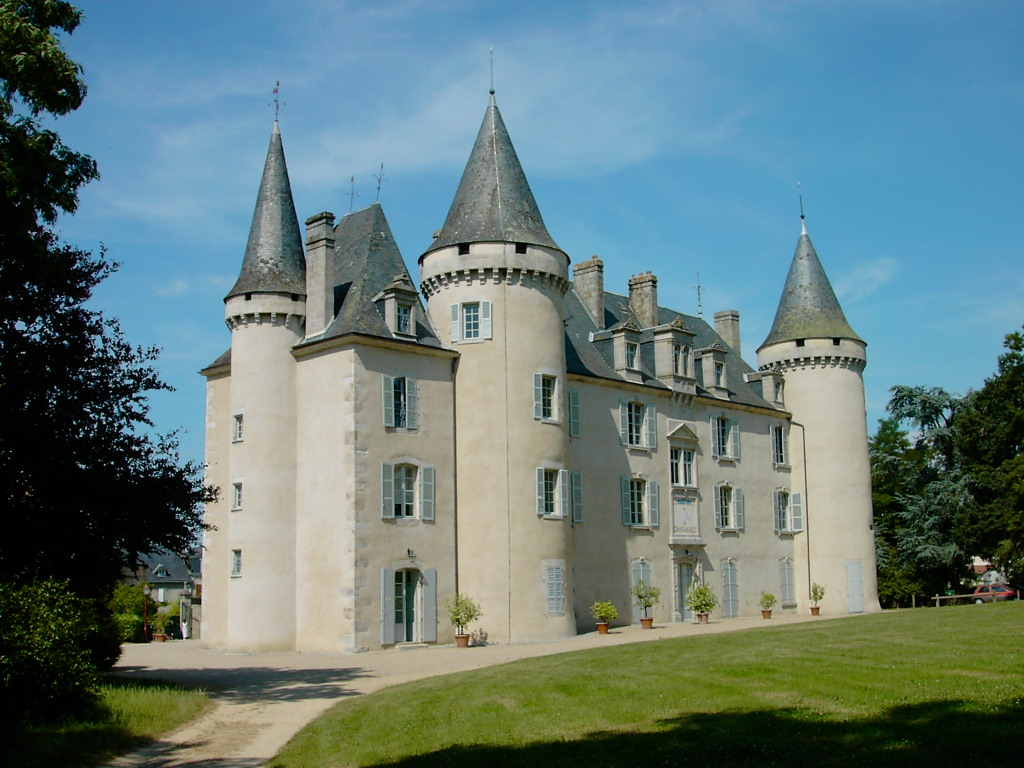
- The Château de Nexon

- Coat of arms
- Location of Nexon
- Location within France Location within Nouvelle-Aquitaine
- Coordinates: 45°40′45″N 1°11′17″E
- Country: France
- Region: Nouvelle-Aquitaine
- Department: Haute-Vienne
- Arrondissement: Limoges
- Canton: Saint-Yrieix-la-Perche
- Intercommunality: Pays de Nexon-Monts de Châlus

Government
  - Mayor (2020–2026): Fabrice Gerville-Reache
- Area^{1}: 40.79 km^{2} (15.75 sq mi)
- Highest elevation: 446 m (1,463 ft)
- Lowest elevation: 295 m (968 ft)
- Population (2023): 2,548
  - Density: 62.47/km^{2} (161.8/sq mi)
- Time zone: UTC+01:00 (CET)
  - Summer (DST): UTC+02:00 (CEST)
- INSEE/Postal code: 87106 /87800
- ^{1} French Land Register data, which excludes lakes, ponds, glaciers > 1 km^{2} (0.386 sq mi or 247 acres) and river estuaries.

Nexon (French pronunciation: [nɛksɔ̃]; Occitan: Neiçon) is a commune in the Haute-Vienne department in the Nouvelle-Aquitaine region in west-central France. Nexon station has rail connections to Bordeaux, Périgueux, Brive-la-Gaillarde and Limoges.

== Population ==
Historical population
Year	Pop.	±% p.a.
1968	2,379	—
1975	2,415	+0.21%
1982	2,379	−0.21%
1990	2,297	−0.44%
1999	2,325	+0.13%
2007	2,412	+0.46%
2012	2,509	+0.79%
2017	2,539	+0.24%
2023	2,548	+0.06%
Source: INSEE

Inhabitants are known as Nexonnais in French.

== See also ==
- Communes of the Haute-Vienne department
