= Lubersac =

- Commune
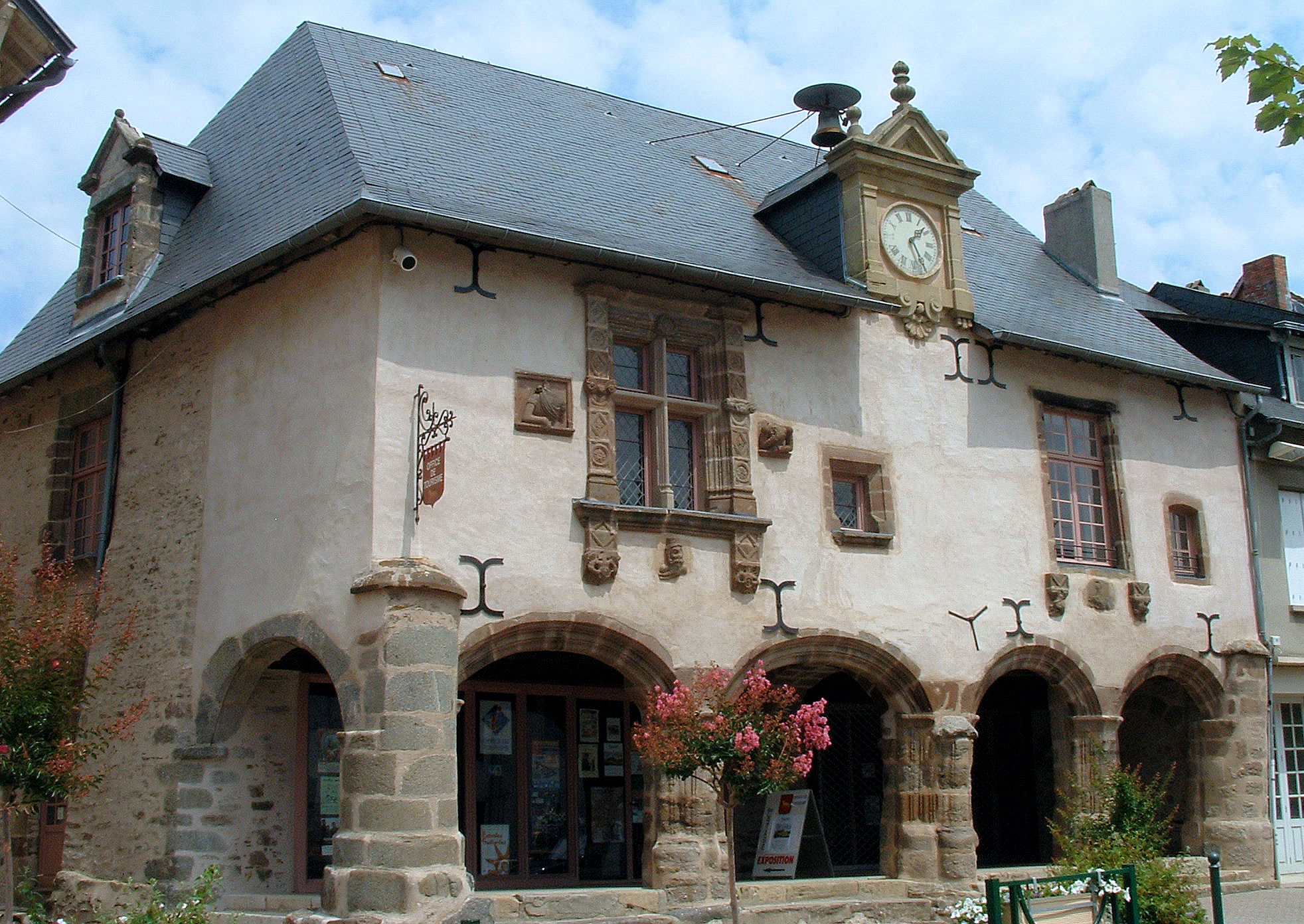
- Renaissance house

- Coat of arms
- Location of Lubersac
- Location within France Location within Nouvelle-Aquitaine
- Coordinates: 45°27′N 1°24′E
- Country: France
- Region: Nouvelle-Aquitaine
- Department: Corrèze
- Arrondissement: Brive-la-Gaillarde
- Canton: Uzerche

Government
  - Mayor (2020–2026): Philippe Gonzalez
- Area^{1}: 57.46 km^{2} (22.19 sq mi)
- Elevation: 390 m (1,280 ft)
- Highest elevation: 400 m (1,300 ft)
- Lowest elevation: 380 m (1,250 ft)
- Population (2023): 2,246
  - Density: 39.09/km^{2} (101.2/sq mi)
- Time zone: UTC+01:00 (CET)
  - Summer (DST): UTC+02:00 (CEST)
- INSEE/Postal code: 19121 /19210
- ^{1} French Land Register data, which excludes lakes, ponds, glaciers > 1 km^{2} (0.386 sq mi or 247 acres) and river estuaries.

Lubersac (French pronunciation: [lybɛʁsak]; Occitan: Liberçac) is a commune in the Corrèze departement in central France near Arnac-Pompadour and Uzerche.

Formerly called Louparsat ('lou percé' in Limousin, lit. 'pierced wolf'), named for a legend in which a knight kills a wolf with a blow of his sword to save his beloved.

== Geography ==
The commune is located on the river Auvézère. Lubersac station has rail connections to Brive-la-Gaillarde, Saint-Yrieix and Limoges.

== Population ==
Its inhabitants are called Lubersacois in French.

Historical population
Year	Pop.	±% p.a.
1968	2,444	—
1975	2,395	−0.29%
1982	2,397	+0.01%
1990	2,248	−0.80%
1999	2,169	−0.40%
2007	2,267	+0.55%
2012	2,263	−0.04%
2017	2,230	−0.29%
2023	2,246	+0.12%
Source: INSEE

== Notable people ==
- Joseph, Count Souham was born in Lubersac on 30 April 1760. He died on 28 April 1837 at Versailles. He was a French general of the First French Empire.

== See also ==
- Communes of the Corrèze department
