= Arnac-Pompadour =

- Commune
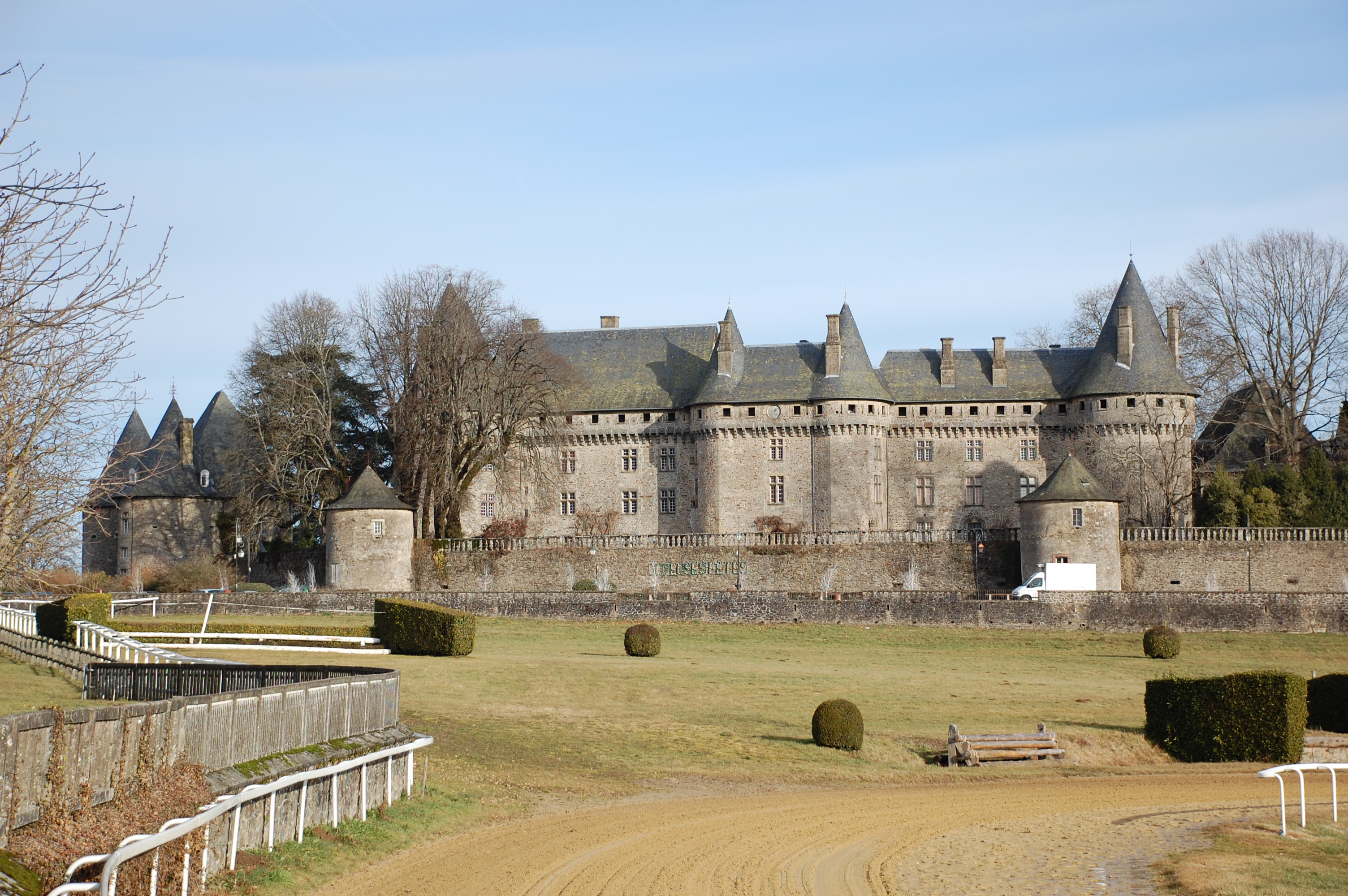
- Chateau of Arnac-Pompadour

- Coat of arms
- Location of Arnac-Pompadour
- Location within France Location within Nouvelle-Aquitaine
- Coordinates: 45°23′50″N 1°22′55″E
- Country: France
- Region: Nouvelle-Aquitaine
- Department: Corrèze
- Arrondissement: Brive-la-Gaillarde
- Canton: Uzerche
- Intercommunality: CC Pays Lubersac-Pompadour

Government
  - Mayor (2020–2026): Alain Tisseuil
- Area^{1}: 15.09 km^{2} (5.83 sq mi)
- Highest elevation: 475 m (1,558 ft)
- Lowest elevation: 279 m (915 ft)
- Population (2023): 1,205
  - Density: 79.85/km^{2} (206.8/sq mi)
- Demonym: Pompadours
- Time zone: UTC+01:00 (CET)
  - Summer (DST): UTC+02:00 (CEST)
- INSEE/Postal code: 19011 /19230
- ^{1} French Land Register data, which excludes lakes, ponds, glaciers > 1 km^{2} (0.386 sq mi or 247 acres) and river estuaries.

Arnac-Pompadour (French pronunciation: [aʁnak pɔ̃paduʁ]; Occitan: Arnac e Pompador) is a commune in the Corrèze department in the Nouvelle-Aquitaine region of central France.

In Nouvelle-Aquitaine and on directional signs, the commune is usually simply called Pompadour, although the actual village of Pompadour is shared between Arnac-Pompadour and Saint-Sornin-Lavolps.

The name of Pompadour is well known due to the favourite of Louis XV, Madame de Pompadour (Jeanne-Antoinette Poisson), to whom the king gave the chateau of Pompadour and the associated title of Marquise.

The town is famous for its chateau and its stud farm, the Pompadour National Anglo-Arab Stud, headquarters of the French National Stud and France's principal production centre of Anglo-Arabian horses (although the racecourse is actually outside the commune).

== Geography ==
Arnac-Pompadour is located some 25 km south-east of Saint-Yrieix-la-Perche and 35 km west by north-west of Brive-la-Gaillarde. Access to the commune is by the D901 road from Lubersac in the north-east passing through the southern part of the commune and the town and continuing south-west to Juillac. The D7 road also comes from Troche in the south-east passing through the town and continuing to Payzac in the west. The D126 goes north from the town through the length of the commune to join the D149 north of the commune. A railway passes through the commune: Pompadour station has rail connections to Brive-la-Gaillarde, Saint-Yrieix and Limoges. The commune is mixed forest and farmland. Apart from the town there are also the following hamlets in the commune:

- Le Mias
- Le Queyraud
- La Federie
- La Pourelie
- Plaisance
- Le Puy Chateau
- Arnac
- Laumonerie
- Chignac
- Bois Redon
- Les Combes
- La Foret Basse
- Puy Marmont

The Auvézère river passes through the north of the commune flowing from east to west. Several tributaries flow north to join it in the commune.

== History ==
Arnac was inhabited in Gallo-Roman times by a landowner named Artonacus or Artonos.

Pompadour belonged to one of the oldest lordships in Limousin: the Lastours, Vicomte de Pompadour. The first castle was built in 1026 by Guy de Lastours to defend his possessions, coveted by the Vicomte de Ségur. He also rebuilt Arnac church and established a monastery there, given to Saint Martial's Abbey in Limoges.

As centuries went by, the suzerainty of the Pompadours spread to all the adjoining parishes. Geoffroi Hélie de Pompadour extended the castle in the 15th century having inherited the illustrious Viscounty of Comborn in 1513. The House of Pompadour had reached its religious, military and political height. Elevated to a marquisate, it died out at the dawn of the 18th century, with several successive deaths.

After that family died out, the inheritance (including the estate, the title and coat-of-arms) was disputed in a long trial between the Prince of Conti and the Marquis de La Vallière and it was finally transferred to the Crown. In 1745, Louis XV gave it to his favourite, Mme d'Étiolles, who was given the title Marquise de Pompadour.

In 1760, a few years before her death, she left the castle and it returned to the Crown. In the following year Louis XV established a Royal Stud at the Castle and the 333 hectare estate (spread across several communes) based on the private stud that had been established by the Marquise in 1751. It was closed at the fall of the Ancien Régime then re-established by the French Directory in 1795 and became the National Stud in 1872. It is currently a famous National Stud specialising particularly in developing the Anglo-Arab breed.

During the French Revolution the commune took the name Arnac-la-Prairie.

=== Heraldry ===
Arms of Arnac-Pompadour	The official status of the blazon remains to be determined Blazon: Azure, 3 towers Argent embattled masoned in Sable.

== Administration ==
List of Successive Mayors

From	To	Name	Party
2001	2014	Jean Michel Reillier	PS
2014	2026	Alain Tisseuil	

== Demography ==
The inhabitants of the commune are known as Pompadours in French.

Historical population

Year	Pop.	±% p.a.
1793	1,016	—
1800	980	−0.51%
1806	930	−0.87%
1821	1,093	+1.08%
1831	1,196	+0.90%
1836	1,346	+2.39%
1841	1,386	+0.59%
1846	1,415	+0.42%
1851	1,408	−0.10%
1856	1,370	−0.55%
1861	1,338	−0.47%
1866	1,342	+0.06%
1872	1,198	−1.87%
1876	1,356	+3.15%
1881	1,425	+1.00%
1886	1,541	+1.58%
1891	1,668	+1.60%
1896	1,676	+0.10%
1901	1,690	+0.17%

Year	Pop.	±% p.a.
1906	1,747	+0.67%
1911	1,807	+0.68%
1921	1,643	−0.95%
1926	1,545	−1.22%
1931	1,556	+0.14%
1936	1,562	+0.08%
1946	1,513	−0.32%
1954	1,447	−0.56%
1962	1,446	−0.01%
1968	1,359	−1.03%
1975	1,441	+0.84%
1982	1,467	+0.26%
1990	1,444	−0.20%
1999	1,334	−0.88%
2007	1,264	−0.67%
2012	1,175	−1.45%
2017	1,133	−0.73%
2023	1,205	+1.03%

Source: EHESS and INSEE

== Cultural heritage ==
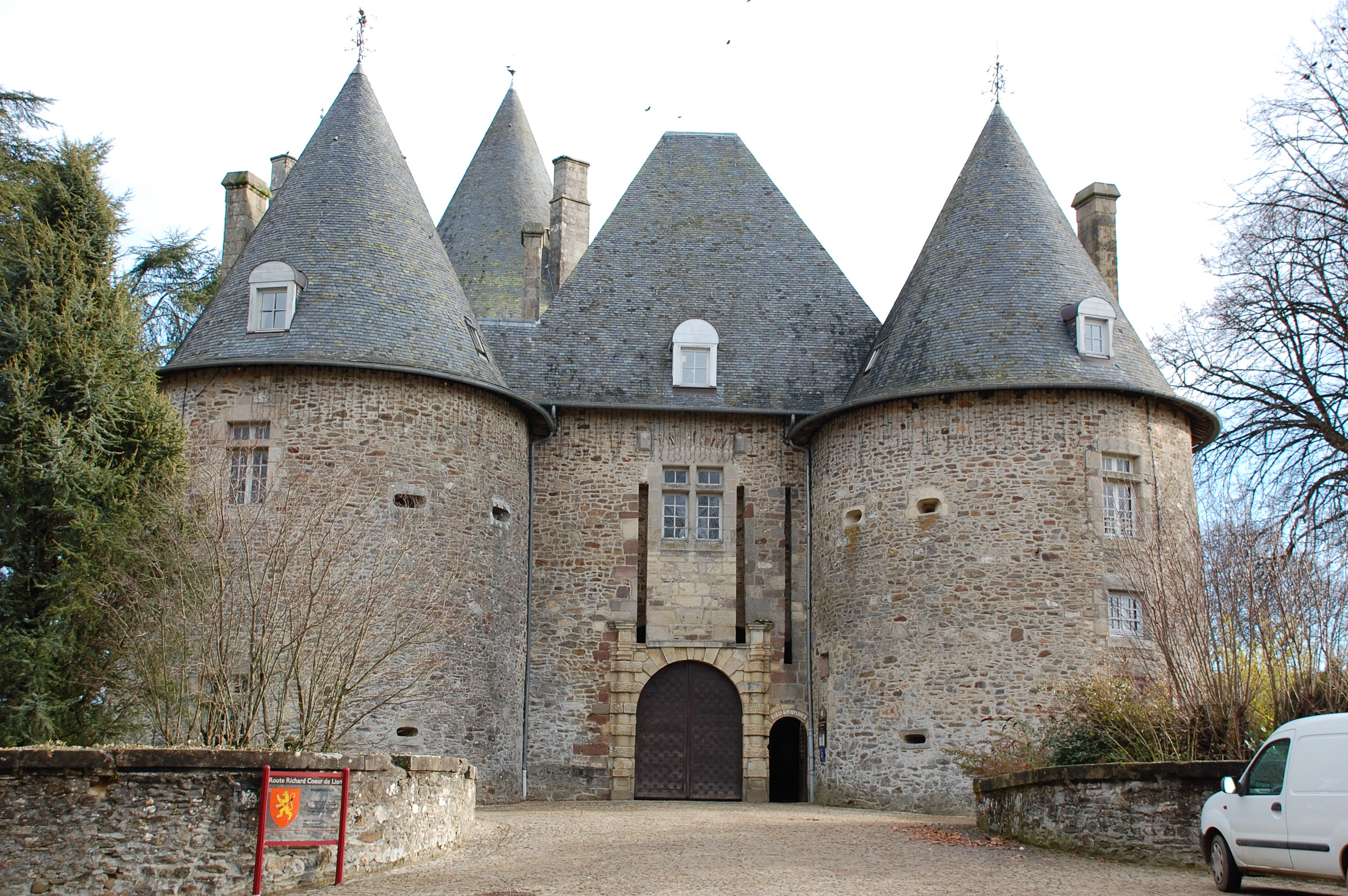
Chateau de Pompadour

=== Civil Heritage ===
- The Château de Pompadour (15th century) is registered as a historical monument. Of the castrum of Guy de Lastours, built around 1000, nothing remains. The castle was completely rebuilt in the 15th century by Geoffrey Helie de Pompadour who became marquis in 1614. The title of Marquis de Pompadour became famous when King Louis XV gave it to his mistress, the famous Marquise de Pompadour in 1745. The marquisate was bought in 1761 by the Duke of Choiseul before the creation in 1763 of the horse stud by the Comptroller General of Finance Bertin. The castle was no longer maintained and was not habitable in 1790 apart from the middle part. After 1793 the castle was mostly pulled down leaving no more than part of the middle and the gatehouse.
- The Pompadour Racecourse is known as the city of the horse and organizes racing every Sunday during the summer in the outdoor enclosure facing the castle. It also hosts an international cross-country course.
- The 'Club Méditerranée of Pompadour village hosts many French and European holidaymakers. It has an accommodation capacity of 450 rooms and numerous sports facilities (19 tennis courts, 3 riding courses with two first-class, five riding schools, a rugby/soccer field etc.). This property has been known since the 1970s to be the spearhead of horse riding for Club Med.
- The National Stud of Pompadour houses the headquarters of the National Stud.
- The Stallion stables of Puy-Marmont houses about 65 stallions of various breeds.

=== Religious heritage ===
- The Chapel of Saint Blaise contains a framed Painting: Child Jesus Sleeping (1863) which is registered as an historical object.
- The Church of Saint-Pierre and Saint-Pardoux (11th century) is registered as a historical monument. The church contains many items that are registered as historical objects:
  - A Statue: Saint Martial (16th century)
  - A framed Painting: The Virgin exiting the Tomb (1875)
  - The whole western facade (15th century)
  - The Shrine of Saints Pardoux and Martial (1764)
  - A Statue: Saint Martial (15th century)
  - A Statue: Saint Pardoux (15th century)
  - A Statue: Virgin and child (15th century)

== Notable people linked to the commune ==
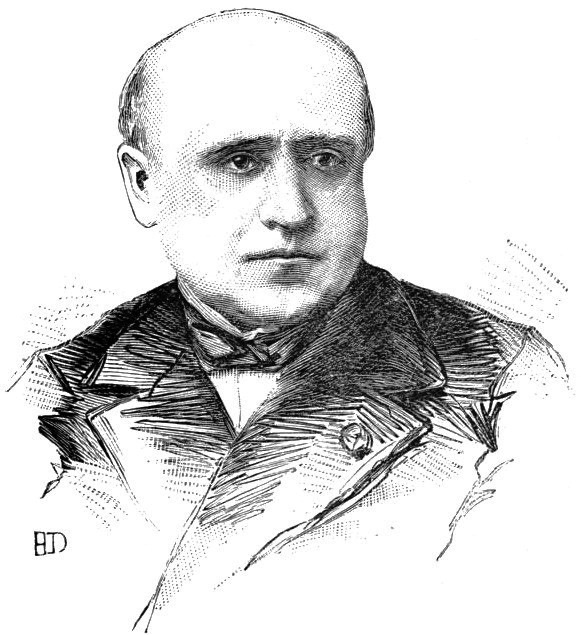
Joseph Brunet

- Joseph Brunet, born at Arnac-Pompadour on 4 March 1829, died at La Bourgade (Haute-Vienne) on 6 January 1891, was a magistrate and politician, Minister of Public Instruction, Culture, and Fine Arts in 1877, Senator for Correze from 1876 to 1885.
- Jules Comby (1853–1947), a famous pediatrician was born in the commune
- Eugene Gayot, former director of the National Stud of Pompadour.
- Pierre Villepreux (1943-), a former rugby union player and national team coach was born in the commune
- Pierre Pechdo, former director of the National Stud of Pompadour.

== Philately ==
A postage stamp, worth 3.00 francs (€0.46), representing Arnac-Pompadour castle was issued on 10 July 1999. A postage stamp for 20g priority letters depicting Arnac-Pompadour castle was issued in 2012. It was part of the "Castles and stately homes of our regions 2012" series.

== See also ==
- Communes of the Corrèze department
