= Varetz station =

Railway station in Varetz, France

Varetz

General information
- Location: Allée Hector Berlioz; 19240 Varetz; France
- Coordinates: 45°11′28″N 1°26′50″E
- Elevation: 108 m (354 ft)
- Owner: SNCF
- Operator: SNCF
- Line: Nexon–Brive-la-Gaillarde
- Platforms: 1
- Tracks: 1
- Train operators: SNCF

Other information
- Website: TER

History
- Opened: 20 December 1875
Location

Varetz is a railway station in Varetz, Nouvelle-Aquitaine, France. The station is located on the Nexon - Brive railway line. The station is served by TER (local) services operated by SNCF.

== Train services ==
The following services currently call at Varetz:

- local service (TER Nouvelle-Aquitaine) Limoges - Saint-Yrieix - Brive-la-Gaillarde

Preceding station	TER Nouvelle-Aquitaine	Following station
Le Burg towards Limoges	23	Brive-la-Gaillarde Terminus
