= Égletons station =

Railway station in Égletons, France

Coordinates: 45°24′08″N 2°03′55″E

Égletons is a railway station in Égletons, Nouvelle-Aquitaine, France. The station is located on the Tulle - Meymac railway line. The station is served by Intercités (long distance) and TER (local) services operated by the SNCF.

== Train services ==
The station is served by regional trains towards Bordeaux, Brive-la-Gaillarde and Ussel.

Preceding station	TER Nouvelle-Aquitaine	Following station
Montaignac-Saint-Hippolyte towards Brive-la-Gaillarde	27	Meymac towards Ussel
Montaignac-Saint-Hippolyte towards Bordeaux	32	Meymac towards Ussel
