= Corrèze station =

Railway station in Nouvelle-Aquitaine, France

Coordinates: 45°19′46″N 1°52′55″E

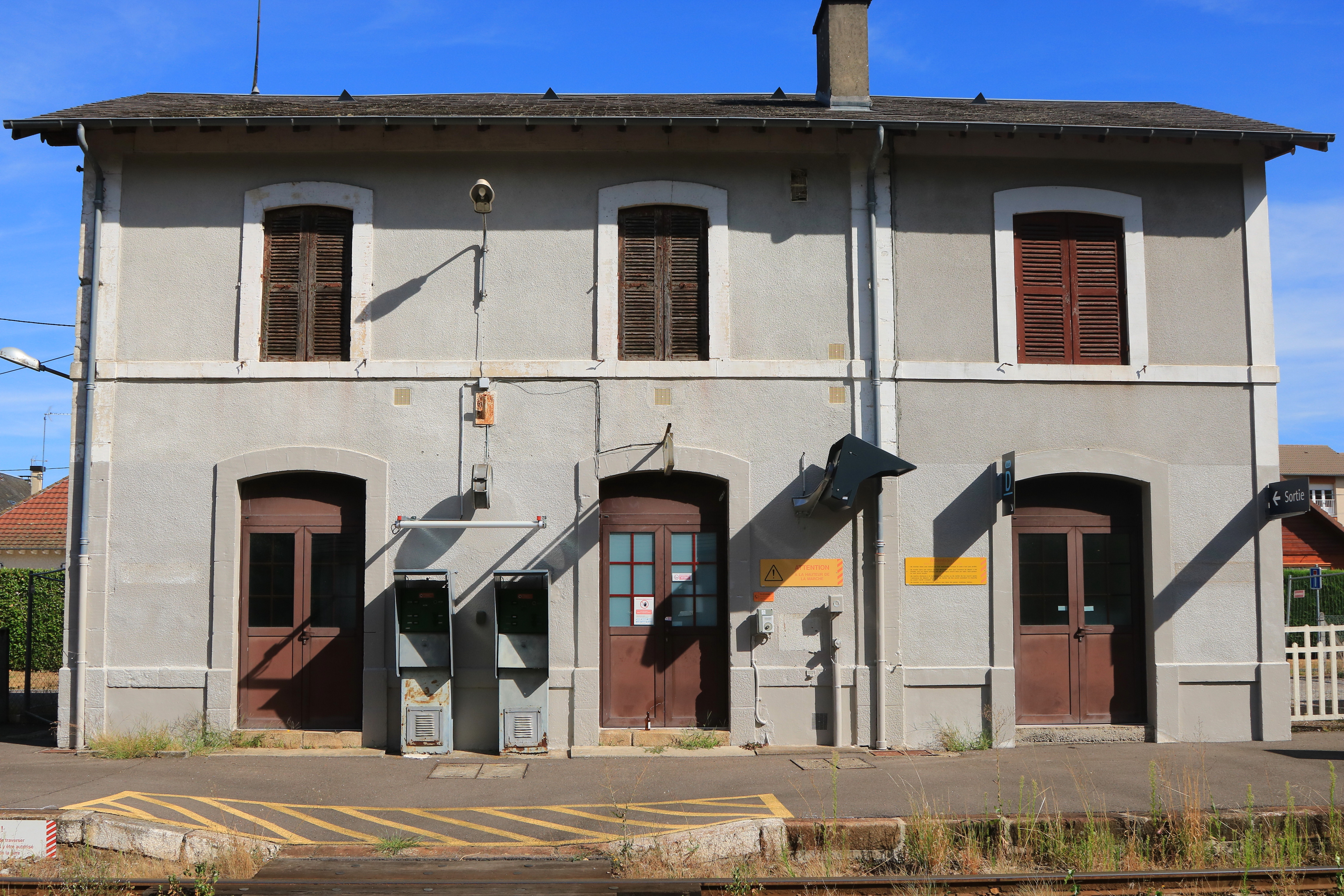

Corrèze is a railway station in Saint-Priest-de-Gimel, Nouvelle-Aquitaine, France. The station is located on the Tulle–Meymac railway line. The station is served by the TER Nouvelle-Aquitaine regional service operated by the SNCF.

== Train services ==
The station is served by regional trains towards Bordeaux, Brive-la-Gaillarde and Ussel.

| Preceding station | TER Nouvelle-Aquitaine | Following station |
|---|---|---|
| Tulle towards Brive-la-Gaillarde | 27 | Montaignac-Saint-Hippolyte towards Ussel |
| Tulle towards Bordeaux | 32 | Montaignac-Saint-Hippolyte towards Ussel |
