= Montaignac-Saint-Hippolyte station =

Railway station in Montaignac-Saint-Hippolyte, France

Coordinates: 45°21′16″N 1°58′47″E

Former passenger building at Montaignac-Saint-Hippolyte station.

Montaignac-Saint-Hippolyte is a railway station in Montaignac-Saint-Hippolyte, Nouvelle-Aquitaine, France. The station is located on the Tulle - Meymac railway line. The station is served by TER (local) services operated by the SNCF.

== Train services ==
The station is served by regional trains towards Bordeaux, Brive-la-Gaillarde and Ussel.

Preceding station	TER Nouvelle-Aquitaine	Following station
Corrèze towards Brive-la-Gaillarde	27	Égletons towards Ussel
Corrèze towards Bordeaux	32	Égletons towards Ussel
