= Tulle station =

Railway station in Tulle, France

Coordinates: 45°15′30″N 1°45′26″E

Tulle
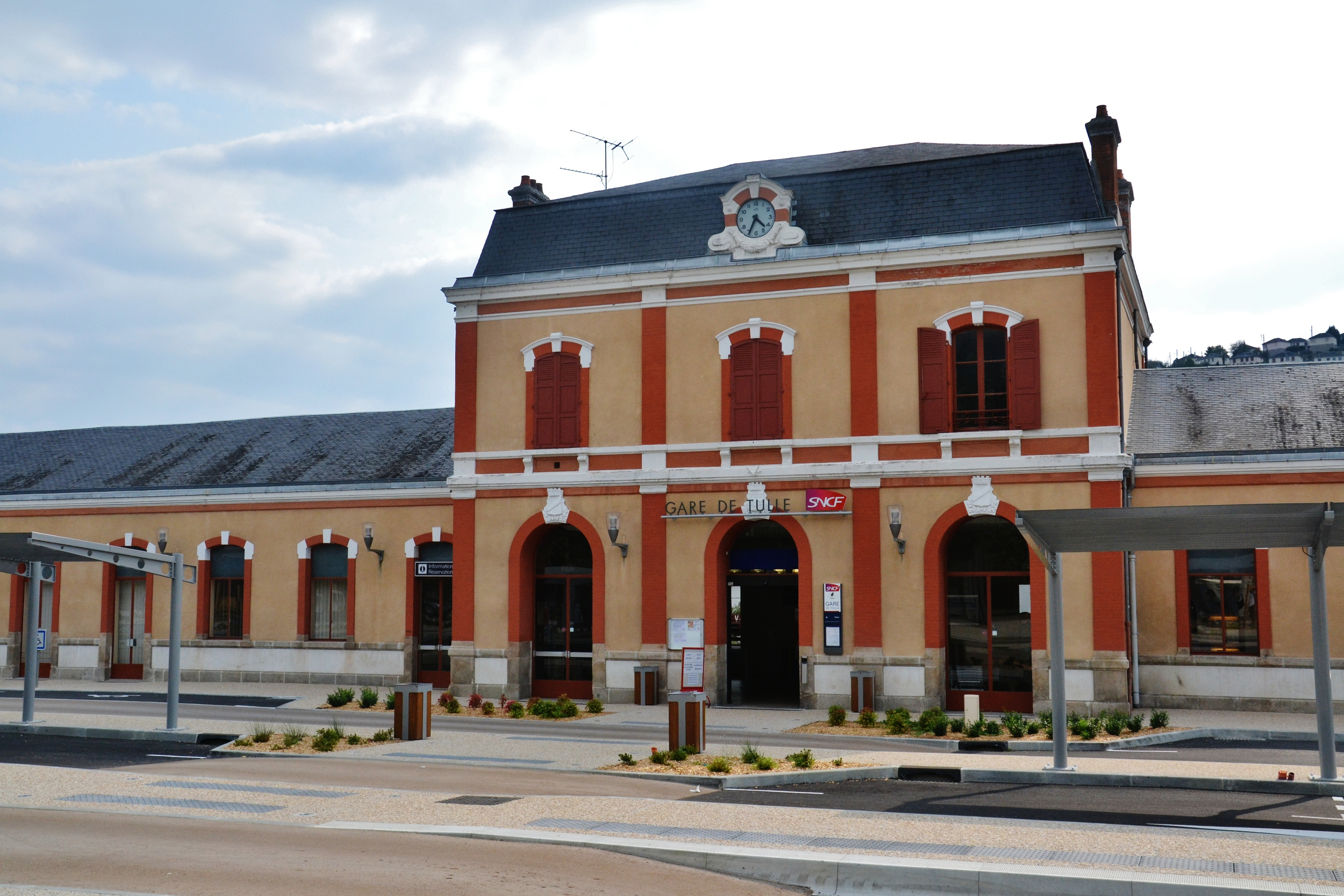

General information
- Location: Place Henri-Queuille 19000 Tulle; France
- Operator: SNCF

Other information
- Station code: 87594499

History
- Opening: 1868

Services
Preceding station	TER Nouvelle-Aquitaine	Following station
Cornil towards Brive-la-Gaillarde	27	Corrèze towards Ussel
Cornil towards Bordeaux	32	Corrèze towards Ussel
Location

Tulle is a railway station in Tulle, in the region of Nouvelle-Aquitaine, France. The station opened on 19 June 1868, and is located on the Coutras - Tulle and Tulle - Meymac railway lines. The station is served by Intercités (long distance) and TER (local) services operated by the SNCF. The station was also on the Tulle - Uzerches railway line between 1904 and 1969. The station is a turn in / reverse out railway station, so all trains have to change direction at this station, unless they use the line avoiding Tulle.

The station ‘features’ in the 1973 film The Day of the Jackal, when the Jackal buys a ticket there, then catches the midday train to Paris. The scenes were filmed at Gare de Veynes - Dévoluy in the Hautes-Alpes.

== Train services ==
The station is served by regional trains towards Bordeaux, Brive-la-Gaillarde and Ussel.

== Bus services ==
A bus service operates to Uzerche and Limoges (Ligne 7).
