= Saint-Aulaire station =

Railway station in Saint-Aulaire, France

Coordinates: 45.2489°N 1.3986°E

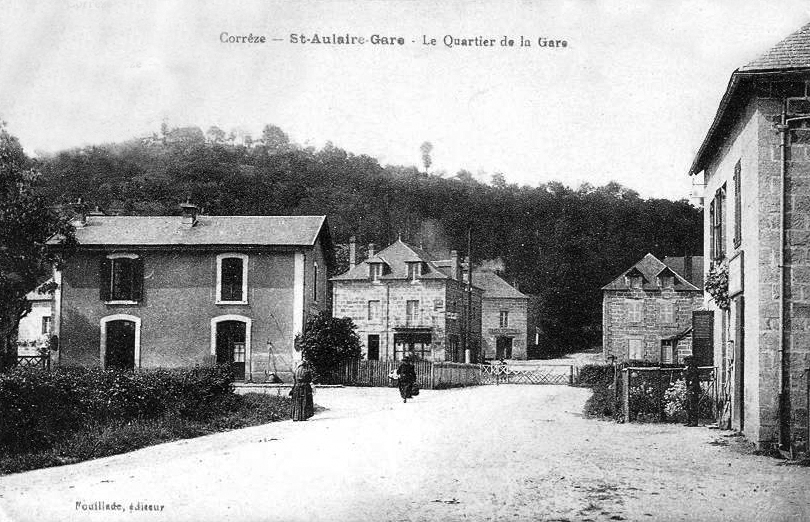
Old photo of the passenger building and the level crossing at Saint-Aulaire station in Corrèze

Saint-Aulaire is a railway station in Saint-Aulaire, Corrèze, Nouvelle-Aquitaine, France. The station is located on the Nexon - Brive railway line. The station is served by TER (local) services operated by SNCF. The station was also on the Thiviers - Saint-Aulaire railway line, which was open between 1898 and 1986.

== Train services ==
The following services currently call at Saint-Aulaire:

- local service (TER Nouvelle-Aquitaine) Limoges - Saint-Yrieix - Brive-la-Gaillarde

| Preceding station | TER Nouvelle-Aquitaine | Following station |
|---|---|---|
| Objat towards Limoges | 23 | Le Burg towards Brive-la-Gaillarde |
