= Vignols–Saint-Solve station =

Railway station in Vignols, France

Coordinates: 45°18′47″N 1°23′52″E

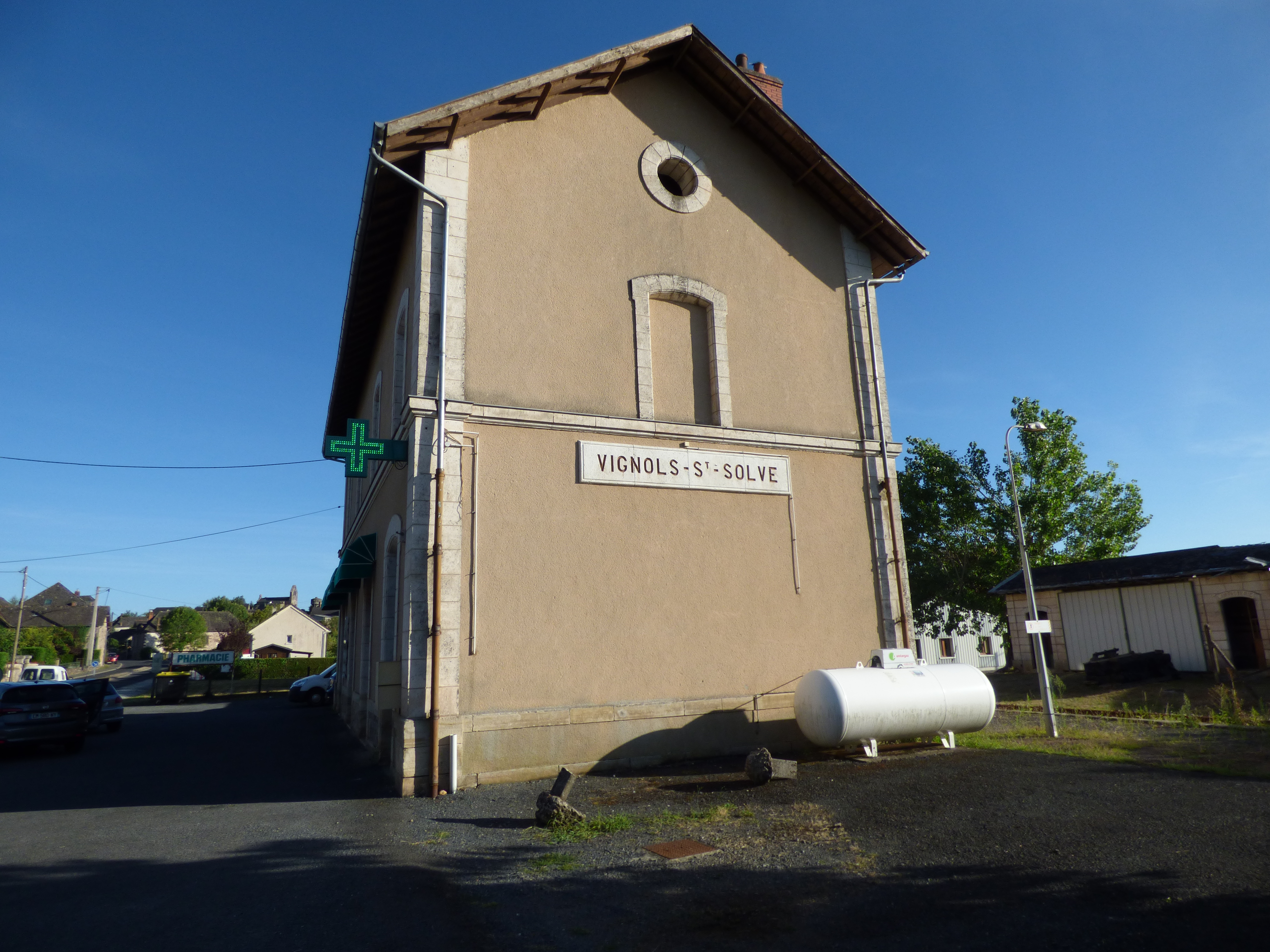
Gare vignols.

Vignols–Saint-Solve is a railway station in Saint-Solve and close to Vignols, Nouvelle-Aquitaine, France. The station is located on the Nexon - Brive railway line. The station is served by TER (local) services operated by SNCF.

== Train services ==
The following services currently call at Vignols-Saint-Solve:

- local service (TER Nouvelle-Aquitaine) Limoges - Saint-Yrieix - Brive-la-Gaillarde

Preceding station	TER Nouvelle-Aquitaine	Following station
Pompadour towards Limoges	23	Objat towards Brive-la-Gaillarde
