= Pompadour station =

Railway station in Arnac-Pompadour, France

Coordinates: 45°23′45″N 1°23′13″E

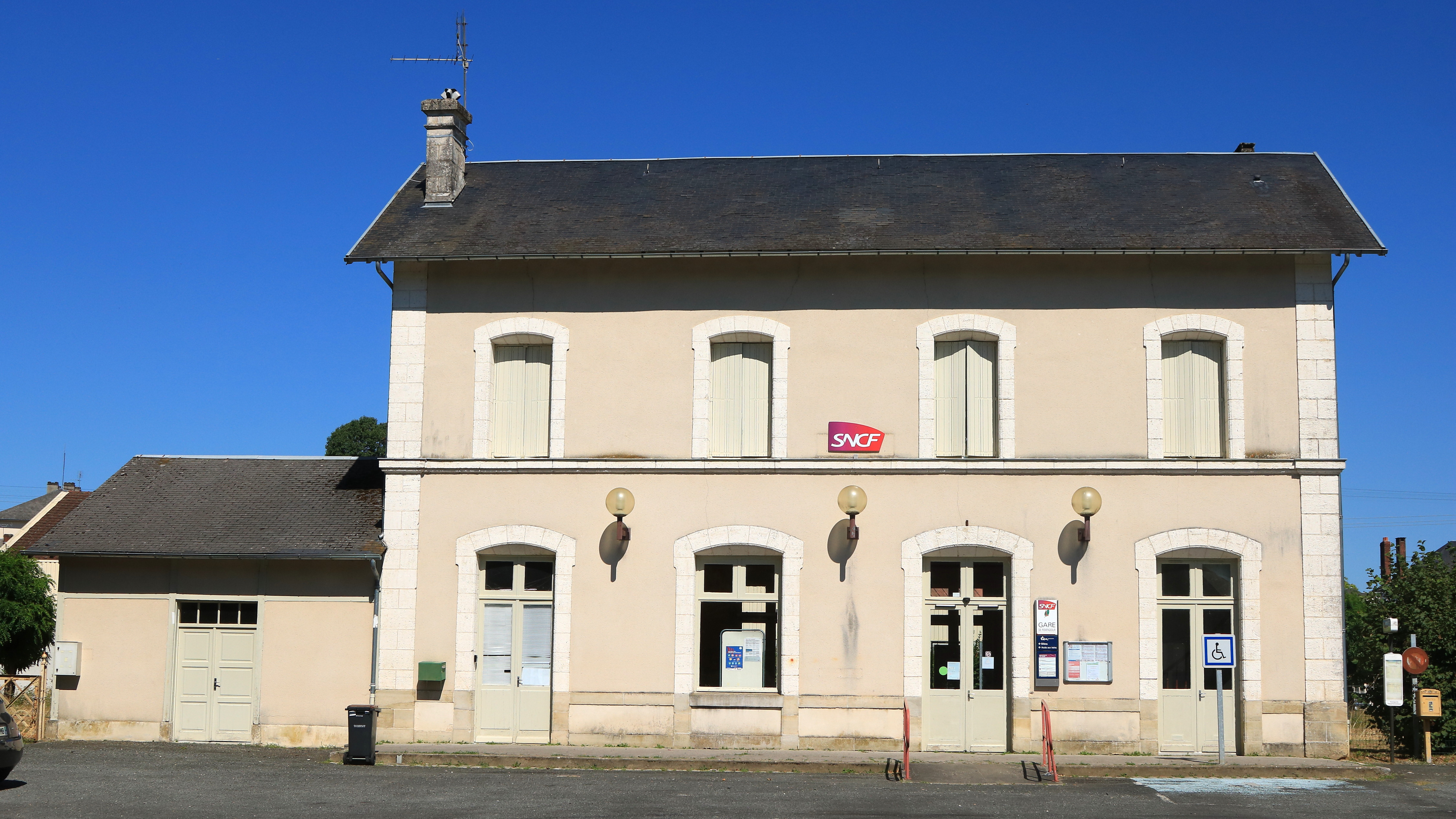

Pompadour is a railway station in Arnac-Pompadour, Nouvelle-Aquitaine, France. The station is located on the Nexon - Brive railway line. The station is served by TER (local) services operated by SNCF.

== Train services ==
The following services currently call at Pompadour:

- local service (TER Nouvelle-Aquitaine) Limoges - Saint-Yrieix - Brive-la-Gaillarde

Preceding station	TER Nouvelle-Aquitaine	Following station
Lubersac towards Limoges	23	Vignols-Saint-Solve towards Brive-la-Gaillarde
