= Lubersac station =

Railway station in Lubersac, France

Coordinates: 45°26′40″N 1°23′23″E

Lubersac is a railway station in Lubersac, Nouvelle-Aquitaine, France. The station is located on the Nexon - Brive railway line. The station is served by TER (local) services operated by SNCF.

== Train services ==
The following services currently call at Lubersac:

- TER Nouvelle-Aquitaine: Limoges - Saint-Yrieix-la-Perche - Brive-la-Gaillarde

Preceding station	TER Nouvelle-Aquitaine	Following station
Coussac-Bonneval towards Limoges	23	Pompadour towards Brive-la-Gaillarde
