= Meymac station =

Railway station in Meymac, France

Coordinates: 45°31′49″N 2°09′51″E

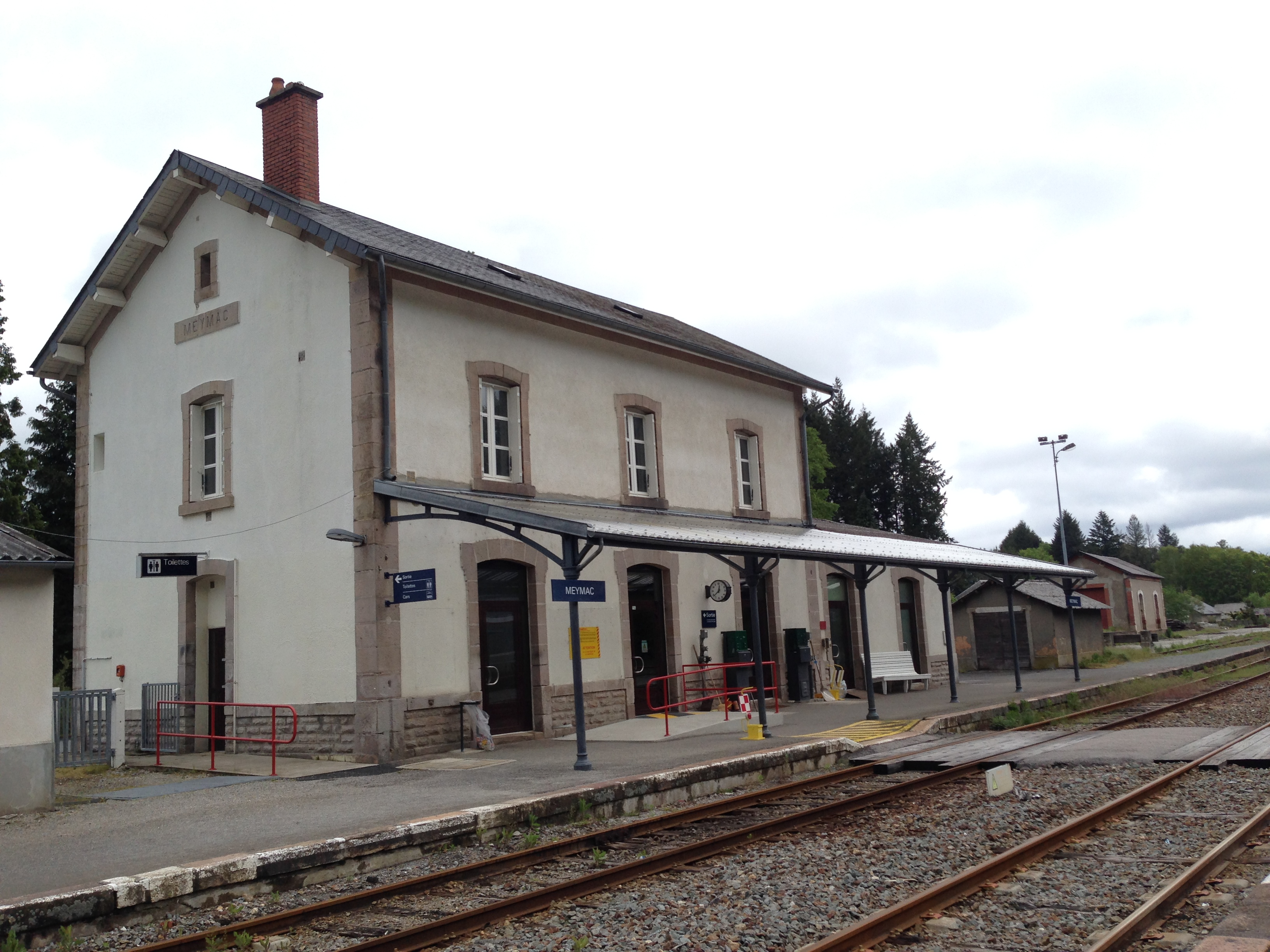
The station in 2014.

Meymac is a railway station in Meymac, Nouvelle-Aquitaine, France. The station is located on the Le Palais - Eygurande-Merlines and Tulle - Meymac railway lines. The station is served by Intercités (long distance) and TER (local) services operated by the SNCF.

== Train services ==
The following services currently call at Meymac:

- local service (TER Nouvelle-Aquitaine) Bordeaux - Brive-la-Gaillarde - Tulle - Ussel
- local service (TER Nouvelle-Aquitaine) Limoges - Ussel

Preceding station	TER Nouvelle-Aquitaine	Following station
Jassonneix towards Limoges	26	Ussel Terminus
Égletons towards Brive-la-Gaillarde	27	Ussel Terminus
Égletons towards Bordeaux	32	Ussel Terminus
