= Objat station =

Railway station in Objat, France

Coordinates: 45°15′49″N 1°24′24″E

Objat
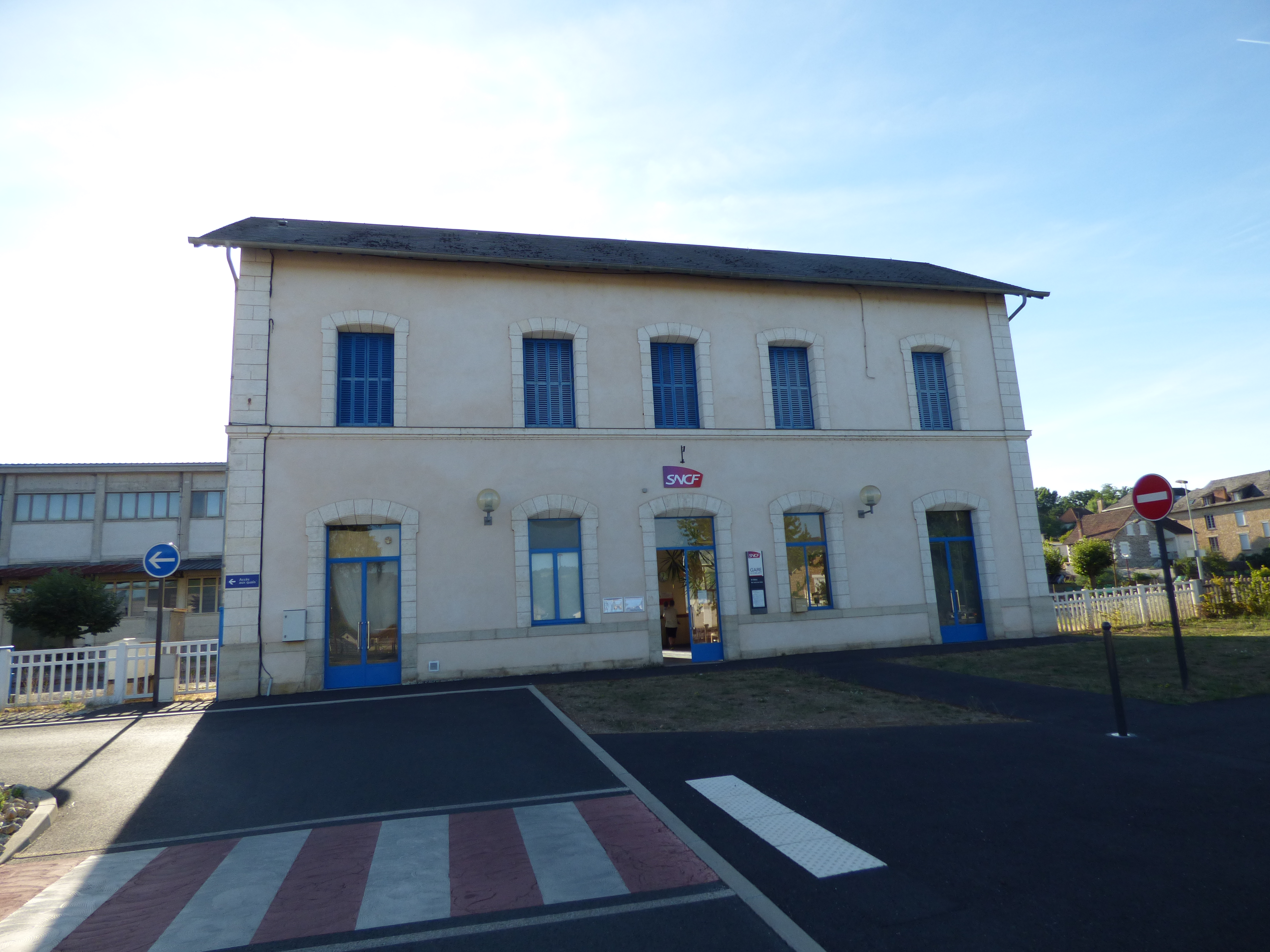
Location

Objat is a railway station in Objat, Nouvelle-Aquitaine, France. The station is located on the Nexon - Brive railway line. The station is served by TER (local) services operated by SNCF.

After a landslide in 2018 disrupted the rails just to the North of Objat, the section between Objat and Saint-Yrieix is travelled by a rail replacement bus service.

== Train service ==
The following services currently call at Objat:

- local service (TER Nouvelle-Aquitaine) Limoges - Saint-Yrieix - Brive-la-Gaillarde

Preceding station	TER Nouvelle-Aquitaine	Following station
Vignols-Saint-Solve towards Limoges	23	Saint-Aulaire towards Brive-la-Gaillarde
