= L'Aiguille station =

Railway station in Bosmie-l'Aiguille, France

Coordinates: 45°46′42″N 1°12′17″E

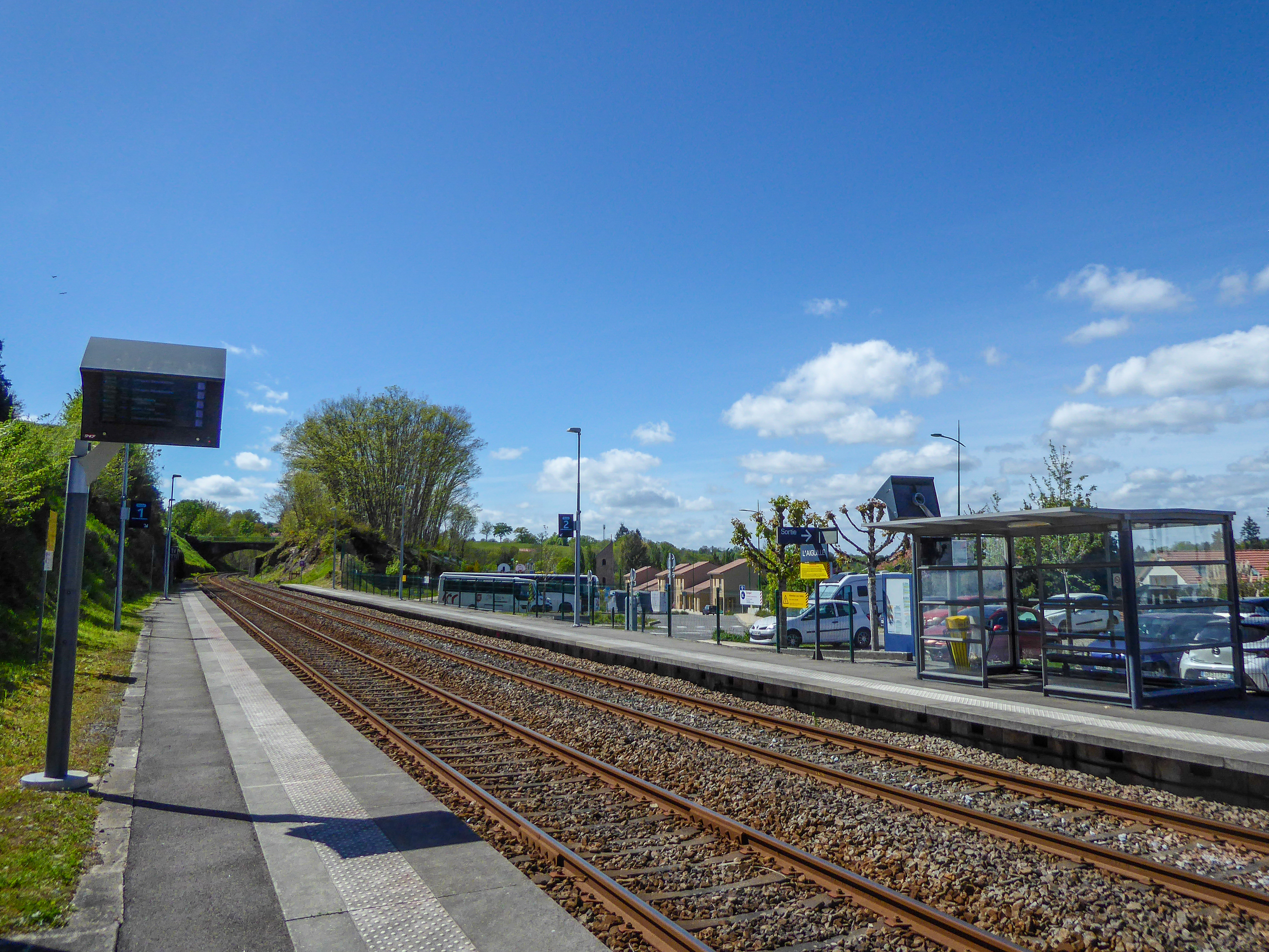
Image of the station.

l'Aiguille is a railway station in Bosmie-l'Aiguille, Nouvelle-Aquitaine, France. The station is located on the Limoges-Bénédictins - Périgueux railway line. The station is served by TER (local) services operated by SNCF.

== Train services ==
The following services call at l'Aiguille as of January 2021:

- local service (TER Nouvelle-Aquitaine) Limoges - Thiviers - Périgueux - Bordeaux
- local service (TER Nouvelle-Aquitaine) Limoges - Saint-Yrieix - Brive-la-Gaillarde

Preceding station	TER Nouvelle-Aquitaine	Following station
Limoges Terminus	23	Nexon towards Brive-la-Gaillarde
Nexon towards Bordeaux	31	Limoges Terminus
