= Pérols-sur-Vézère =

- Commune
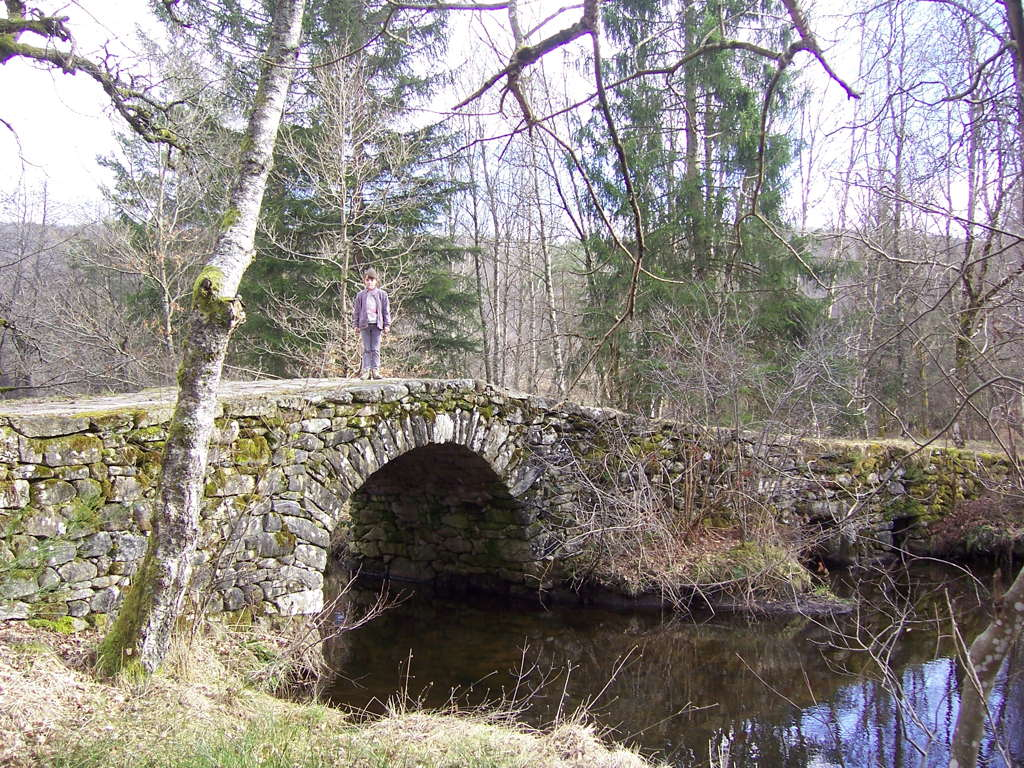
- The Varieras bridge

- Coat of arms
- Location of Pérols-sur-Vézère
- Location within France Location within Nouvelle-Aquitaine
- Coordinates: 45°35′13″N 1°58′50″E
- Country: France
- Region: Nouvelle-Aquitaine
- Department: Corrèze
- Arrondissement: Ussel
- Canton: Plateau de Millevaches
- Intercommunality: Haute-Corrèze Communauté

Government
  - Mayor (2026–32): Alain Fonfrede
- Area^{1}: 46.98 km^{2} (18.14 sq mi)
- Highest elevation: 943 m (3,094 ft)
- Lowest elevation: 708 m (2,323 ft)
- Population (2023): 201
  - Density: 4.28/km^{2} (11.1/sq mi)
- Time zone: UTC+01:00 (CET)
  - Summer (DST): UTC+02:00 (CEST)
- INSEE/Postal code: 19160 /19170
- ^{1} French Land Register data, which excludes lakes, ponds, glaciers > 1 km^{2} (0.386 sq mi or 247 acres) and river estuaries.

Pérols-sur-Vézère (French pronunciation: [peʁɔl syʁ vezɛʁ], literally Pérols on Vézère; Occitan: Peròls de Vesera) is a commune in the Corrèze department in central France.

== Toponymy ==
The name of Pérols appears in the 12th-century in the form Perolz, then Perols around 1315. According to Marcel Villoutreix, this toponym is a Romanesque formation that designates a group of small pear trees (from the Latin pirus, "pear tree").

== Geography ==
As its name suggests, the commune is touched by the Vézère river which, to the north-west, separates it from the commune of Bugeat. It is also watered by three tributaries of the Vézère, the Corrèze which has its source in the municipal territory, the Rochers stream and the Ars river, as well as by the two main tributaries of the Ars, the Maisons stream and the Pérols stream. The village itself sits at an altitude of 770m.

== Population ==
Historical population
Year	Pop.	±% p.a.
1968	373	—
1975	297	−3.20%
1982	229	−3.65%
1990	214	−0.84%
1999	182	−1.78%
2007	184	+0.14%
2012	184	+0.00%
2017	185	+0.11%
2023	201	+1.39%
Source: INSEE

== Places and monuments ==
- The town has three historical monuments:
  - The 15th-century cross placed on the wall of the school, inscribed by decree of the 2 January 1929.
  - L'église Saint-Léonard de Barsanges, built in the 12th-century. The building was listed as a historical monument by decree of 12 June 1926.
  - The Pont de Variéras, a bridge dating from the Carolingian period, listed by decree of 24 May. 1991.
- L'église Saint-Côme-et-Saint-Damien de Pérols-sur-Vézère. It is listed in the General Inventory of Cultural Heritage.
- The Moulins de Razel et Chaumeil.
- The thatched houses of Variéras.
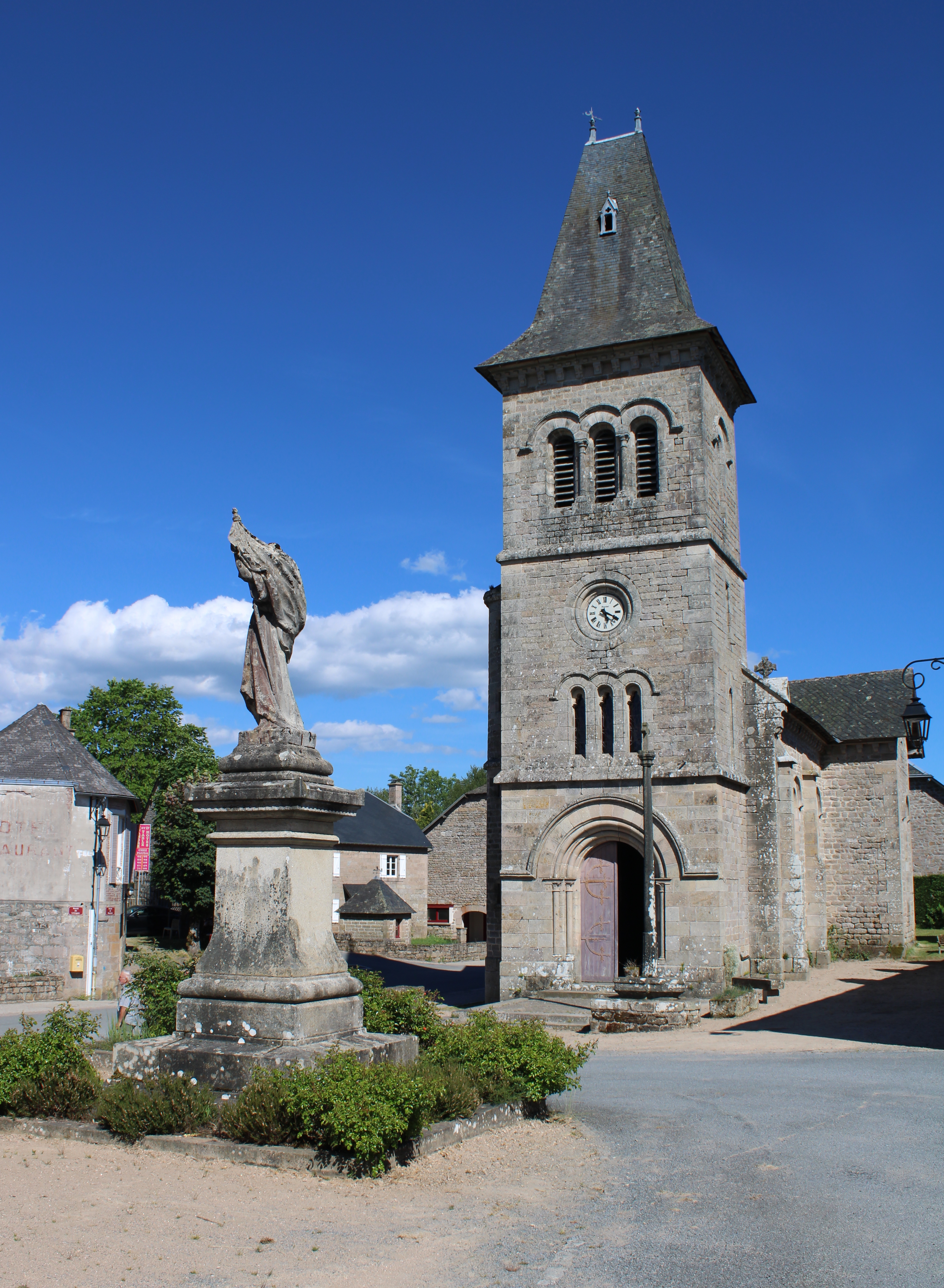
Church of Saint-Côme-et-Saint-Damien de Pérols-sur-Vézère.

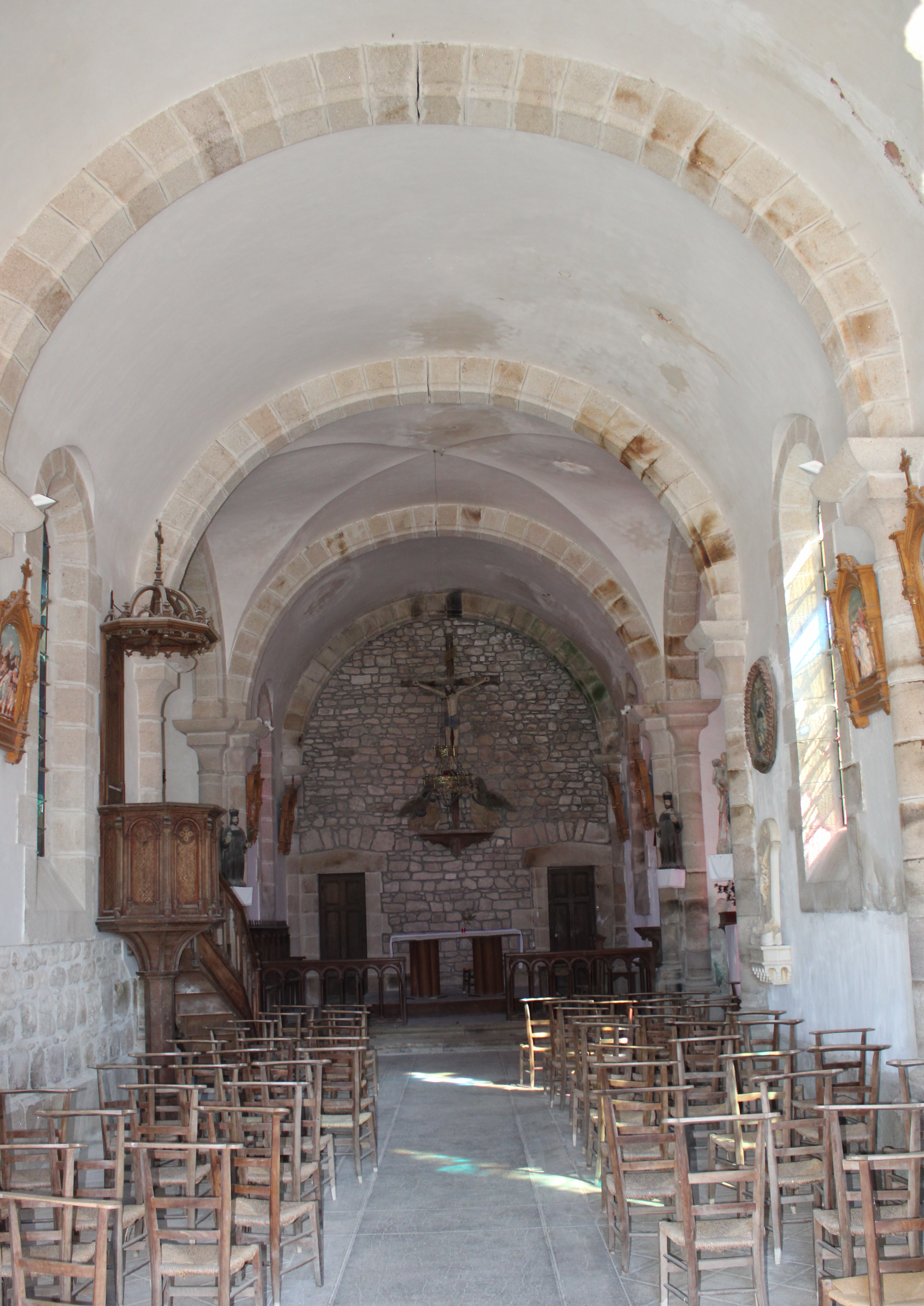
Nave.

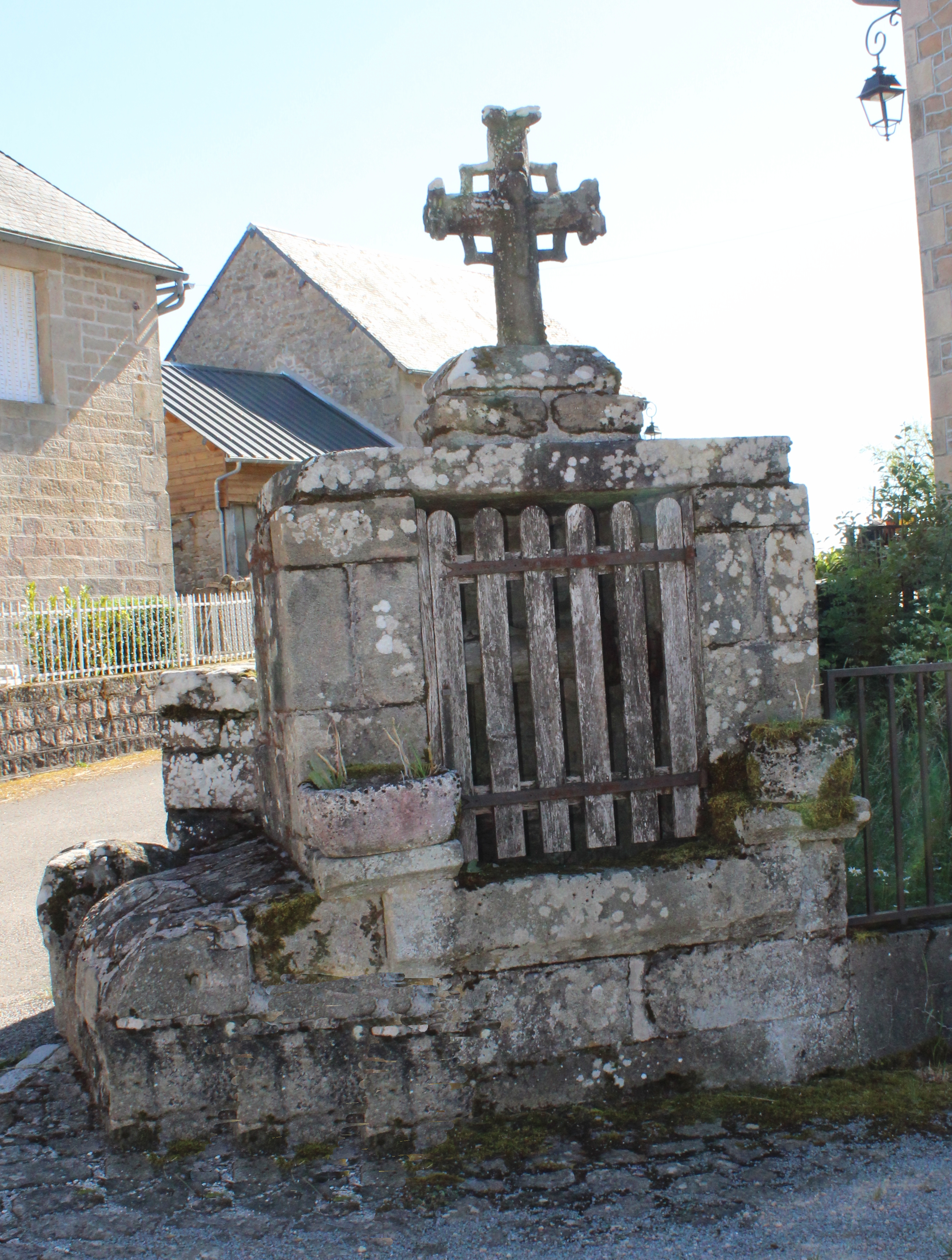
Former public well topped by a Calvary

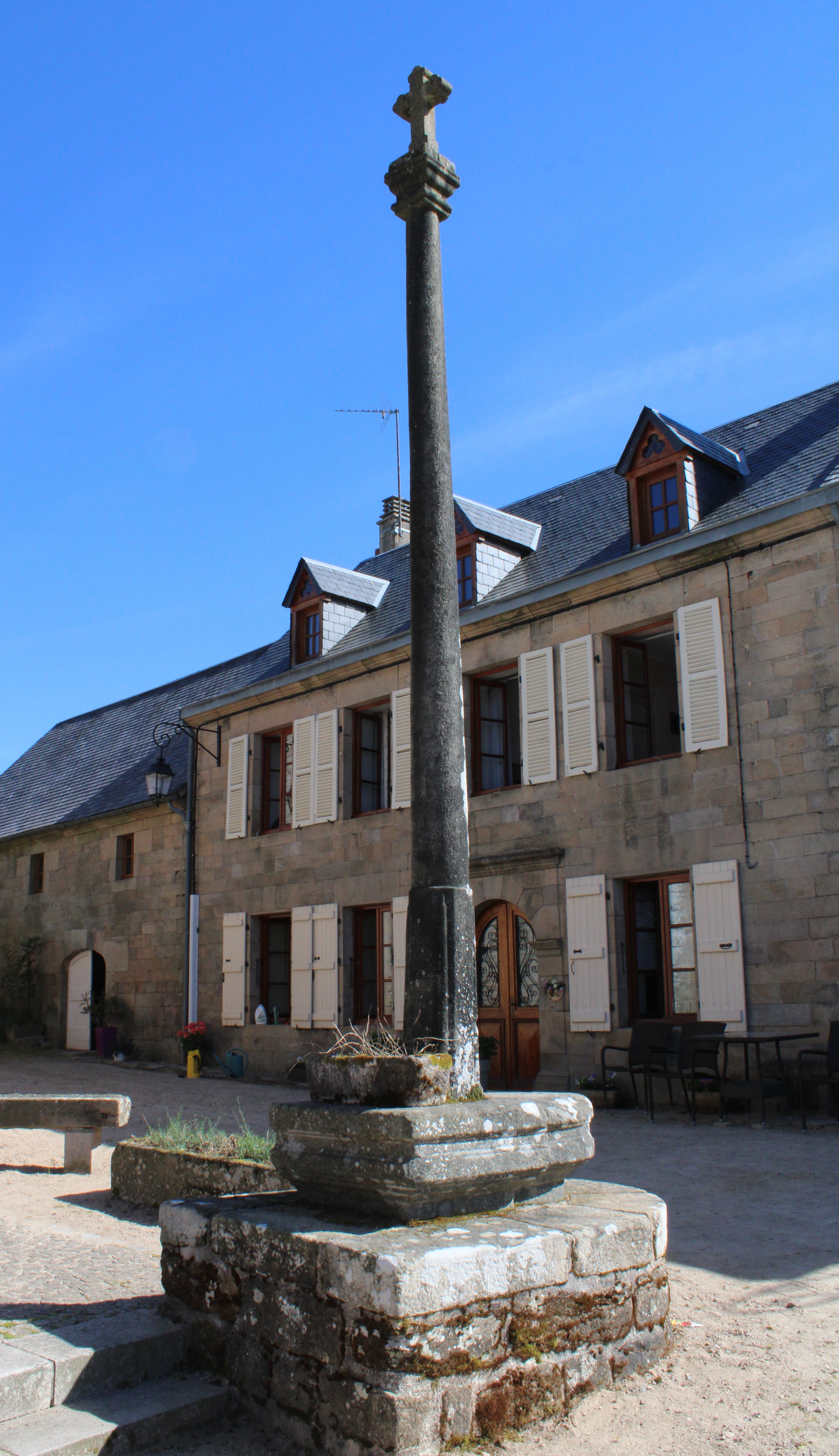
The cross on the church square.

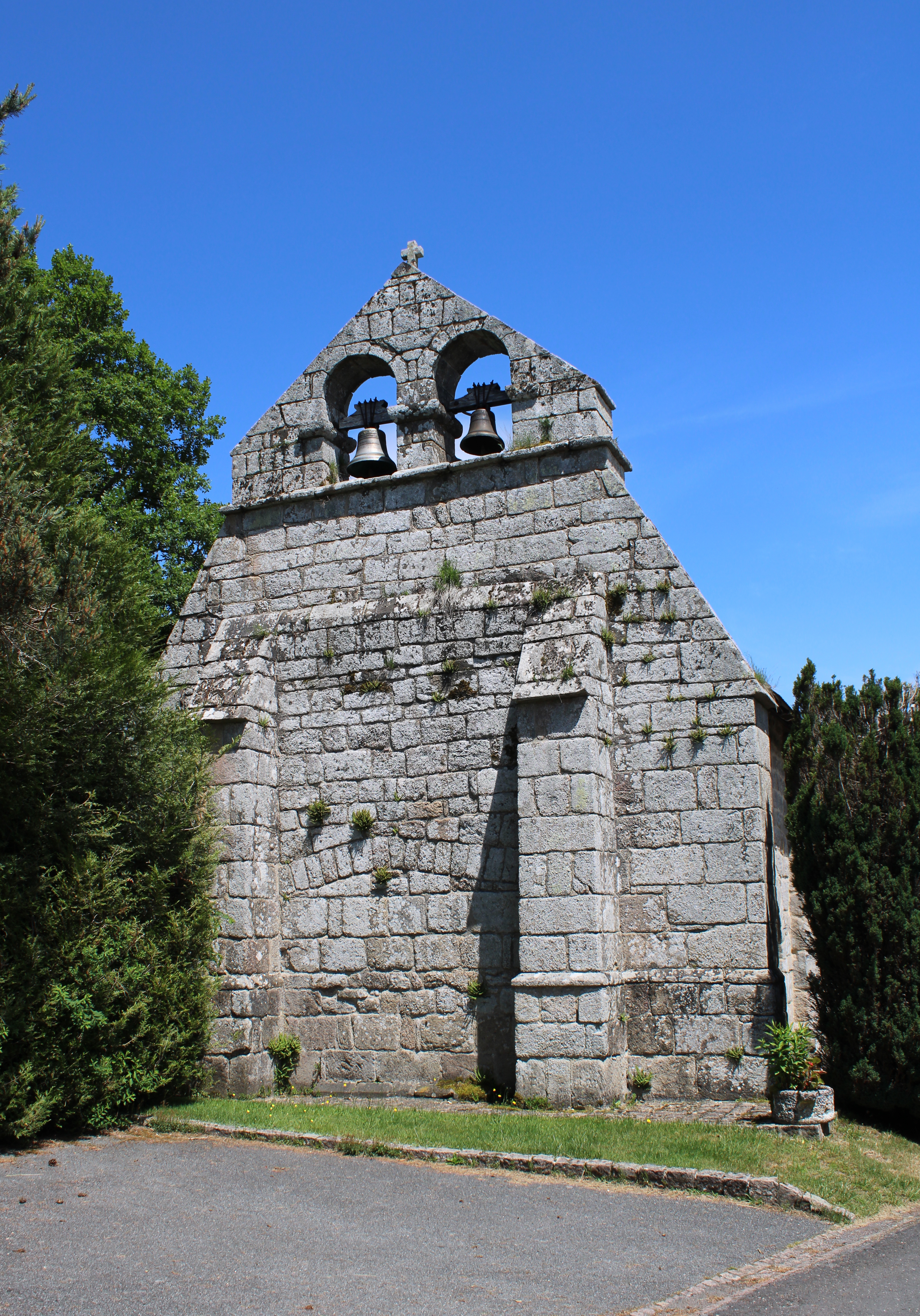
Bell tower of the church of Saint-Léonard de Barsanges.

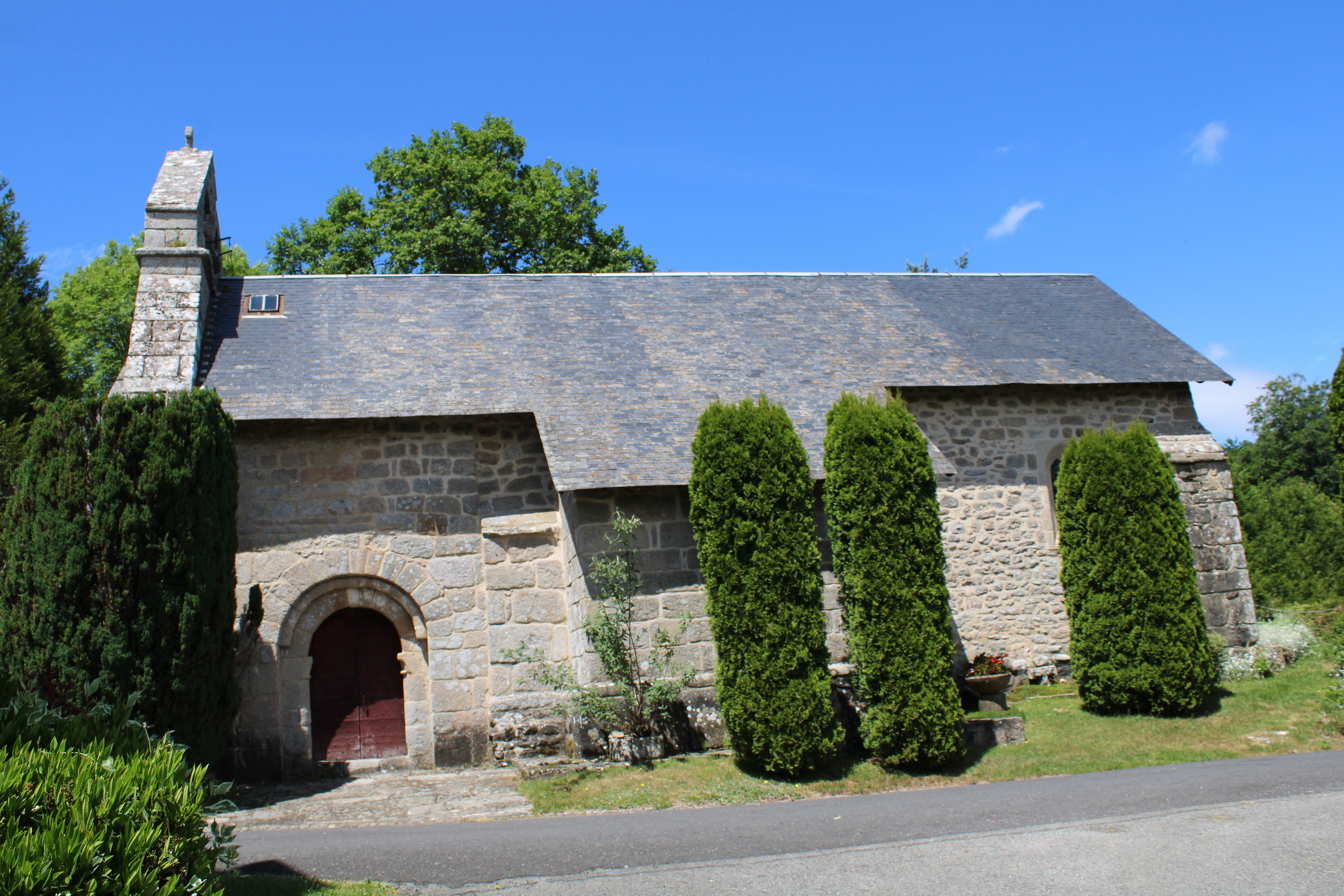
The church of Saint-Léonard and its Romanesque style porch.

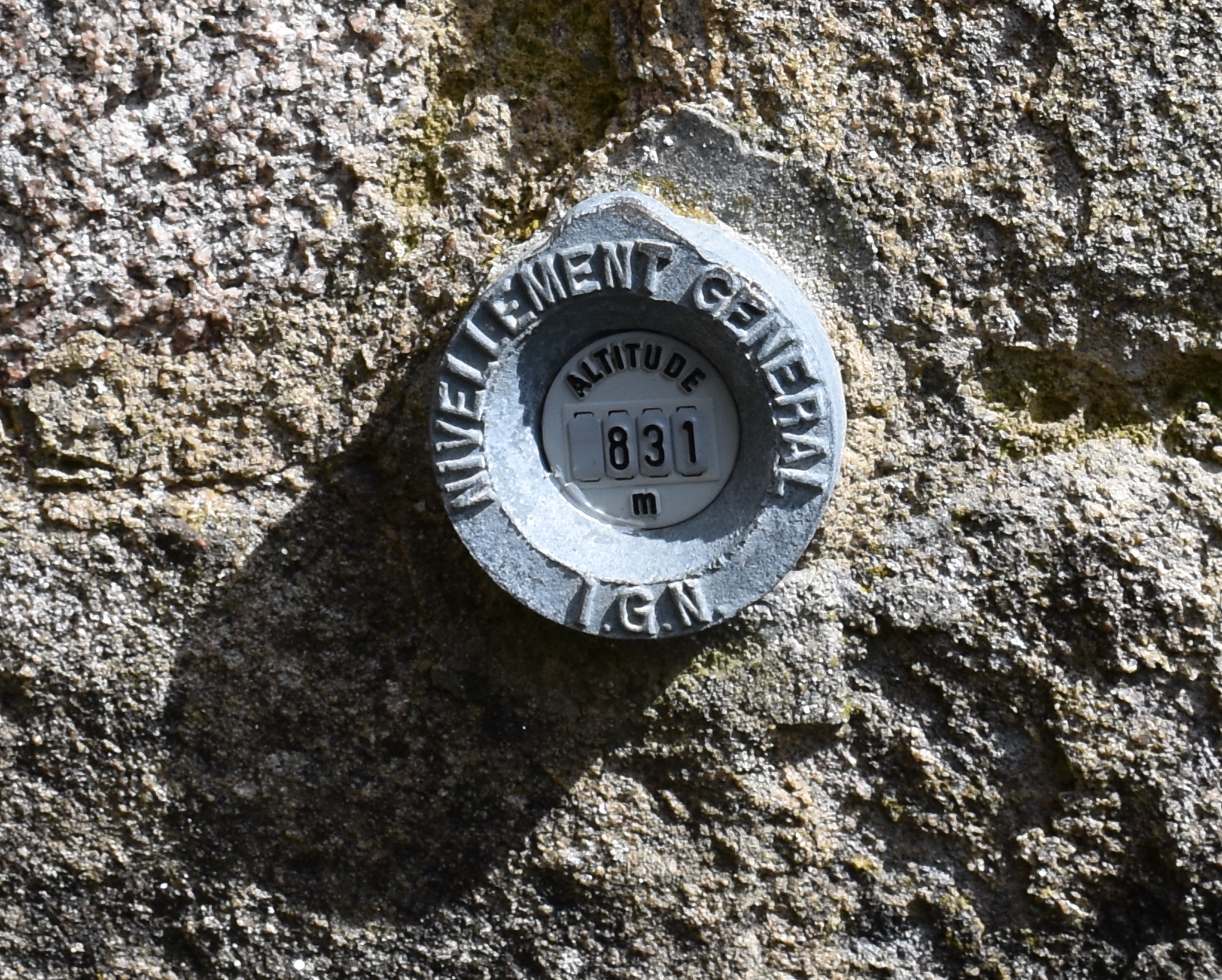
Levelling marker on the church wall - Altitude 831 m.

== Personalities linked to the commune ==
- André Chadeau (born 1927 in Pérols-sur-Vézère - 2017), French civil servant and French company director, notably president of the SNCF.
- Marius Vazeilles, who set up the Arboretum du Puy Chabrol in Barsanges.

== See also ==
- Communes of the Corrèze department
