= Coussac-Bonneval station =

Railway station in Nouvelle-Aquitaine, France

Coordinates: 45°30′28″N 1°28′41″E

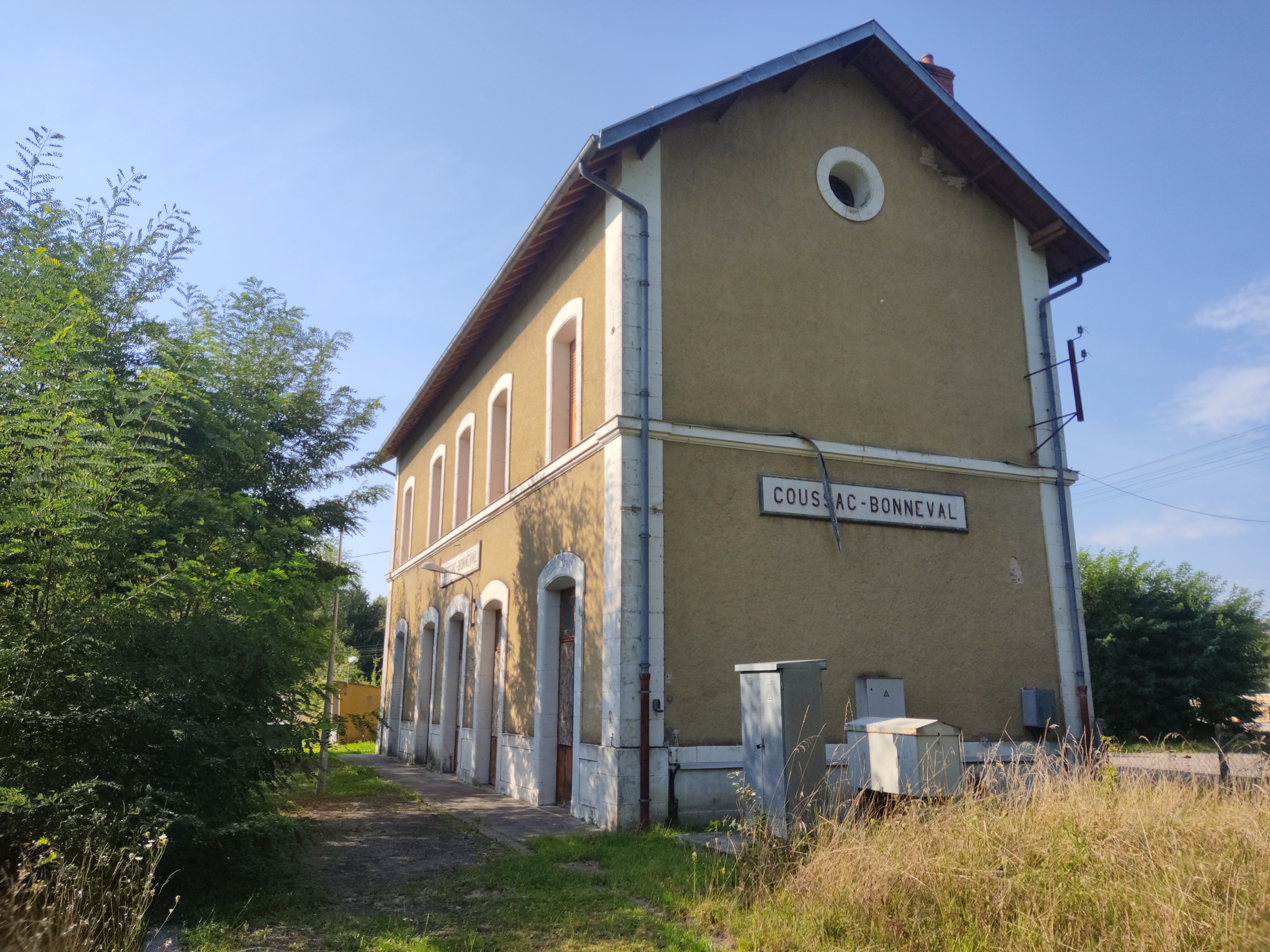

Coussac-Bonneval is a railway station in Coussac-Bonneval, Nouvelle-Aquitaine, France. The station is located on the Nexon - Brive railway line. The station is served by TER (local) services operated by SNCF.

== Train services ==
The following services currently call at Coussac-Bonneval:

- local service (TER Nouvelle-Aquitaine) Limoges - Saint-Yrieix - Brive-la-Gaillarde

Preceding station	TER Nouvelle-Aquitaine	Following station
Saint-Yrieix-la-Perche towards Limoges	23	Lubersac towards Brive-la-Gaillarde
