= Le Burg station =

Railway station in Varetz, France

Coordinates: 45°12′57″N 1°25′47″E

Le Burg is a railway station located in Varetz, Nouvelle-Aquitaine, France. The station is situated on the Nexon -Brive railway line. It is served by TER (local) services operated by SNCF.

== Train services ==
The following services currently callavailable at urg:

- local service (TER Nouvelle-Aquitaine) Limoges - Saint-Yrieix - Brive-la-Gaillarde

Preceding station	TER Nouvelle-Aquitaine	Following station
Saint-Aulaire towards Limoges	23	Varetz towards Brive-la-Gaillarde
