= Laqueuille =

- Commune
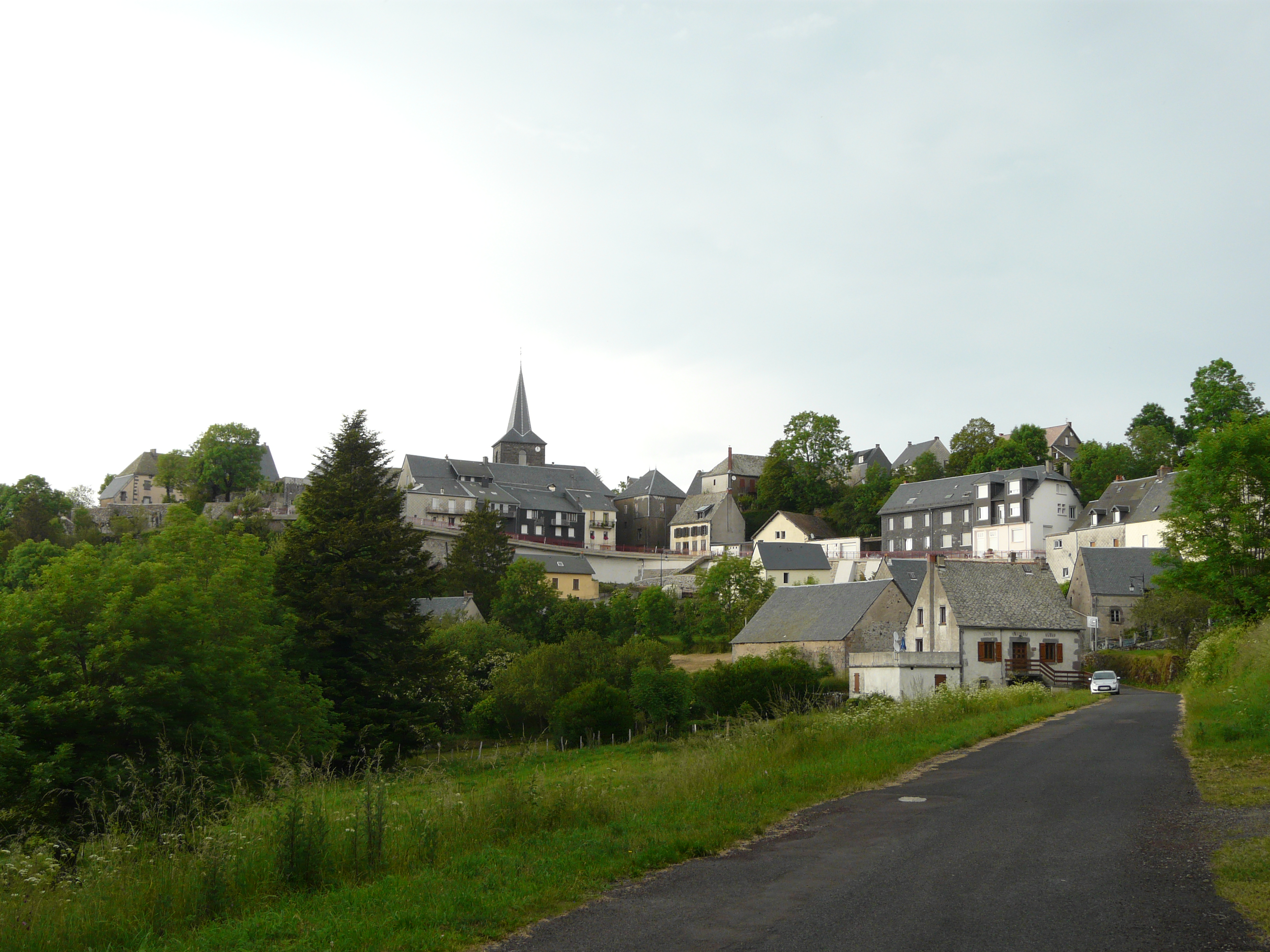
- A general view of Laqueuille

- Coat of arms
- Location of Laqueuille
- Location within France Location within Auvergne-Rhône-Alpes
- Coordinates: 45°39′03″N 2°44′00″E
- Country: France
- Region: Auvergne-Rhône-Alpes
- Department: Puy-de-Dôme
- Arrondissement: Issoire
- Canton: Orcines
- Intercommunality: Dômes Sancy Artense

Government
  - Mayor (2026–32): Eric Brugière
- Area^{1}: 22.07 km^{2} (8.52 sq mi)
- Highest elevation: 1,000 m (3,300 ft)
- Lowest elevation: 857 m (2,812 ft)
- Population (2023): 351
  - Density: 15.9/km^{2} (41.2/sq mi)
- Time zone: UTC+01:00 (CET)
  - Summer (DST): UTC+02:00 (CEST)
- INSEE/Postal code: 63189 /63820
- ^{1} French Land Register data, which excludes lakes, ponds, glaciers > 1 km^{2} (0.386 sq mi or 247 acres) and river estuaries.

Laqueuille (French pronunciation: [lakœj]) is a commune in the Puy-de-Dôme department in Auvergne in central France.

== See also ==
- Communes of the Puy-de-Dôme department
