= Objat =

- Commune
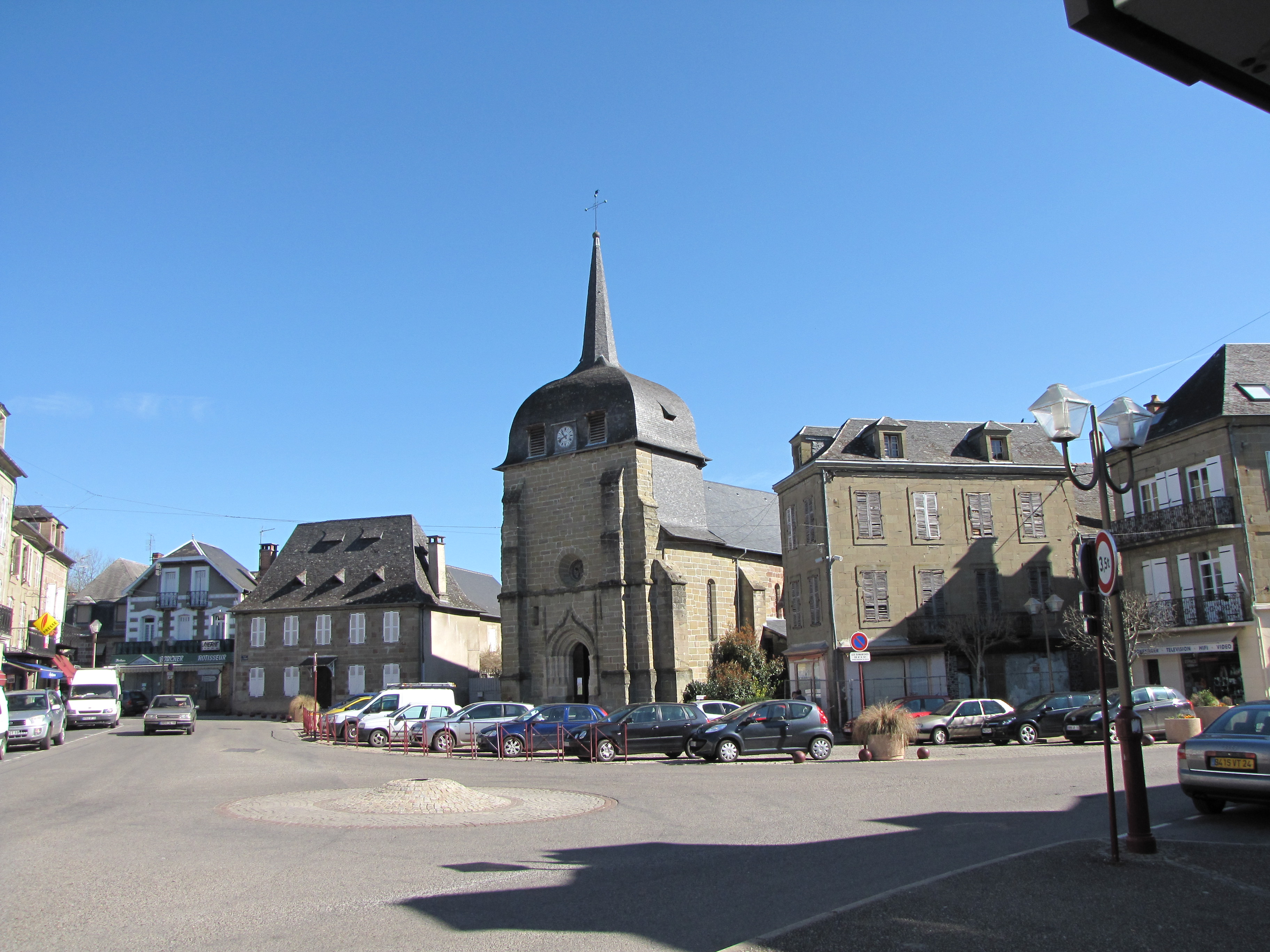
- The church in Objat

- Coat of arms
- Location of Objat
- Location within France Location within Nouvelle-Aquitaine
- Coordinates: 45°15′50″N 1°24′33″E
- Country: France
- Region: Nouvelle-Aquitaine
- Department: Corrèze
- Arrondissement: Brive-la-Gaillarde
- Canton: L'Yssandonnais
- Intercommunality: CA Bassin de Brive

Government
  - Mayor (2020–2026): Philippe Vidau
- Area^{1}: 9.57 km^{2} (3.69 sq mi)
- Elevation: 125 m (410 ft)
- Highest elevation: 244 m (801 ft)
- Lowest elevation: 109 m (358 ft)
- Population (2023): 3,721
  - Density: 389/km^{2} (1,010/sq mi)
- Time zone: UTC+01:00 (CET)
  - Summer (DST): UTC+02:00 (CEST)
- INSEE/Postal code: 19153 /19130
- ^{1} French Land Register data, which excludes lakes, ponds, glaciers > 1 km^{2} (0.386 sq mi or 247 acres) and river estuaries.

Objat (French pronunciation: [ɔbʒa]; Occitan: Ajac) is a commune in the Corrèze department, Nouvelle-Aquitaine, France. The inhabitants are called Objatois and Objatoises.

== Geography ==
Fifteen kilometres north-west of Brive-la-Gaillarde, the municipality of Objat is located in the valley of the Loyre (a tributary of the Vézère) which crosses the town centre. The municipality is limited to the southwest by the Loyre and the Roseix rivers, and to the west by Mayne stream. Objat station has rail connections to Brive-la-Gaillarde, Saint-Yrieix and Limoges.

== Population ==
Historical population
Year	Pop.	±% p.a.
1968	2,701	—
1975	3,077	+1.88%
1982	3,211	+0.61%
1990	3,163	−0.19%
1999	3,372	+0.71%
2007	3,490	+0.43%
2012	3,564	+0.42%
2017	3,640	+0.42%
2023	3,721	+0.37%
Source: INSEE

== Places and Monuments ==
- St. Bartholomew's Church from 15th century with its steeple redone in the 19th century.
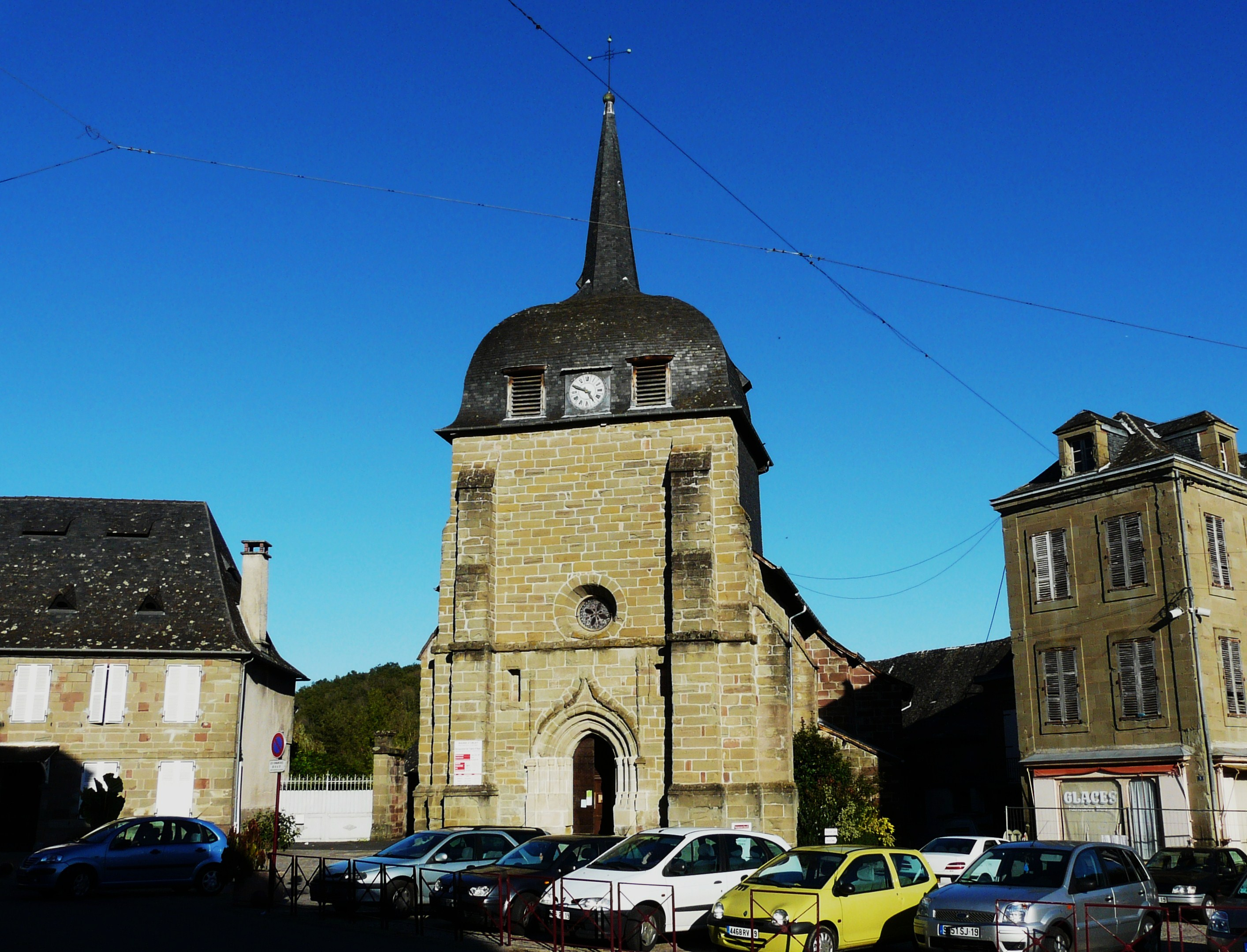
The church of Objat

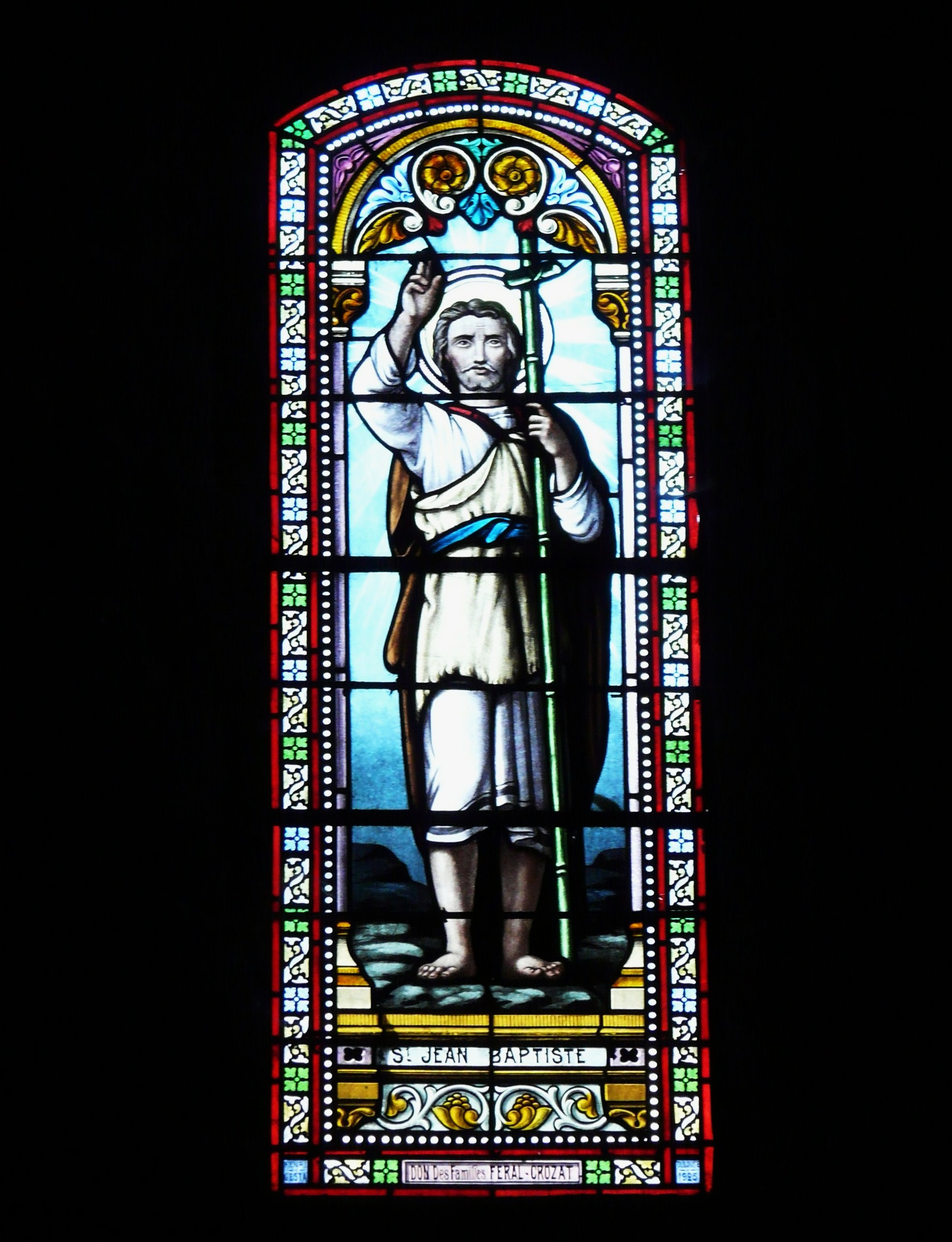
The stained glass of Saint-Jean-Baptiste

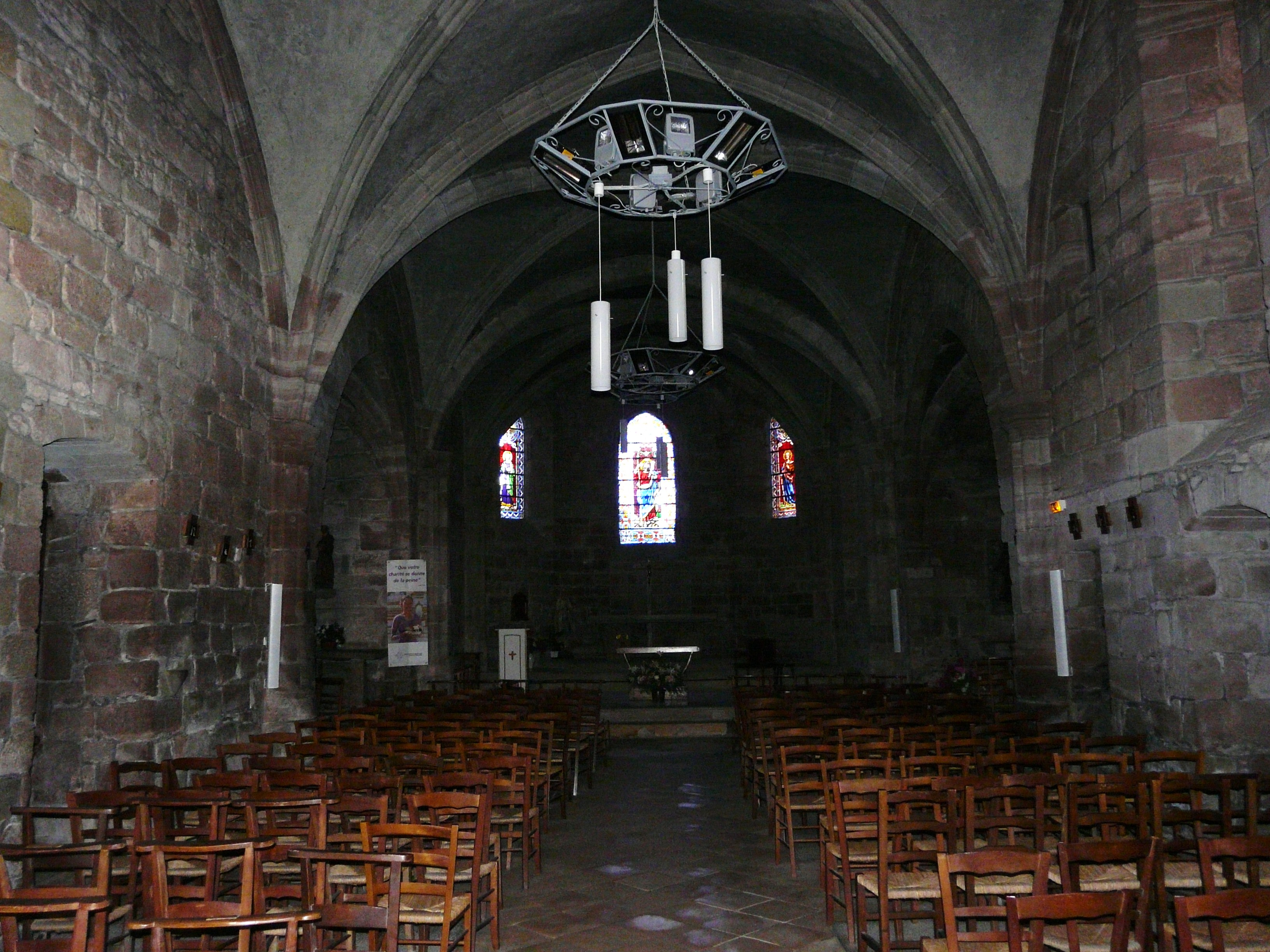
The nave

== Notable people ==
- Gérard Brutus, writer born in Objat in 1959.
- Eugène Freyssinet (1879–1962), a French engineer who invented prestressed concrete, was born in Objat.
- Max Mamers, racing driver twice champion of France de Rallycross, organizer of the Andros Trophy and the Paris–Corrèze road bicycle race.
- Pierre Bessot (1935–), a former rugby union player, was born in Objat.
- Frédéric Desnoyer (1955–), a former rugby union player, was born in Objat.

== Local life ==
=== Education ===
- Marie-Cournil nursery school
- Michel-Sirie elementary school
- Eugène-Freyssinet public college

The college is one of the sites where the media were present in September 2011, when sixth grade classes were not open because of the back-to-school strikes.

=== Events ===
The Objat Association organises many cultural events such as outdoor concerts or other gatherings around a specific theme.

=== Sports ===
L'US Objat, a rugby club representing the city, plays at Stade Léon-Féral. L'USO is currently playing in the Honneur division. The club maintains a strong rivalry with the Pompadour.

Objat has a handball club: the Handball Club Objat Corrèze whose senior men's team is currently playing in [evasive] in National 3. The club was founded in 1975 and now has nearly 250 members.

== See also ==
- Communes of the Corrèze department
