= Nexon station =

Railway station in Nexon, France

Coordinates: 45°41′32″N 1°10′39″E

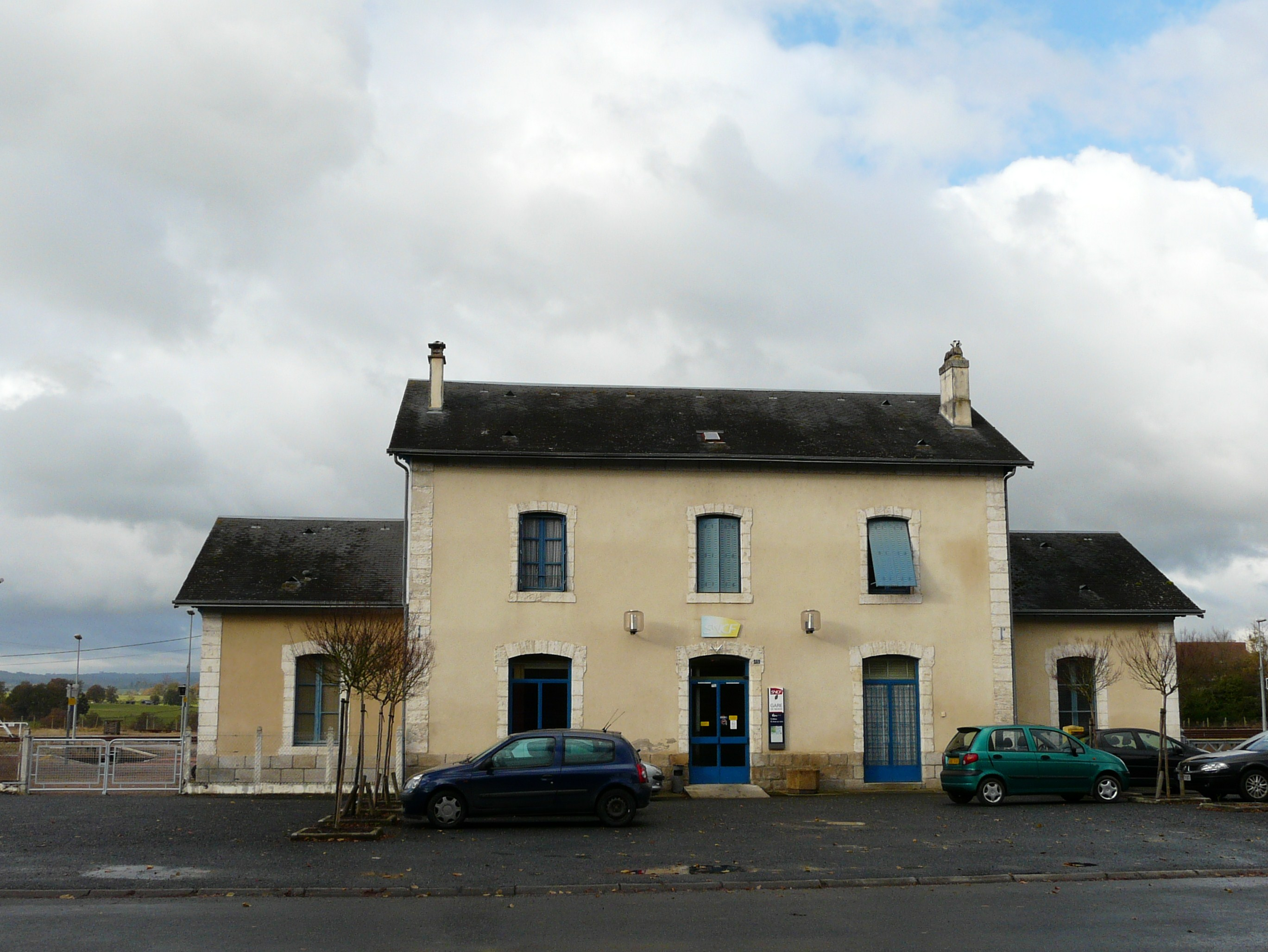
Nexon station

Nexon is a railway station in Nexon, Haute-Vienne, Nouvelle-Aquitaine, France. The station is located on the Limoges-Bénédictins - Périgueux and Nexon - Brive railway lines. The station is served by TER (local) services operated by SNCF.

== Train services ==
The following services call at Nexon as of January 2021:

- local service (TER Nouvelle-Aquitaine) Limoges - Thiviers - Périgueux - Bordeaux
- local service (TER Nouvelle-Aquitaine) Limoges - Saint-Yrieix - Brive-la-Gaillarde

Preceding station	TER Nouvelle-Aquitaine	Following station
L'Aiguille towards Limoges	23	La Meyze towards Brive-la-Gaillarde
Lafarge towards Bordeaux	31	L'Aiguille towards Limoges
