= Ussel station =

Railway station in Ussel, France

Coordinates: 45°33′26″N 2°18′49″E

Ussel is a railway station in Ussel, Nouvelle-Aquitaine, France. The station is located on the Brive-Ussel and Limoges-Ussel railway lines. The line eastwards to Laqueuille and onwards to Clermont Ferrand was closed in 2014 due to the poor state of the track, and a lack of agreement between regional authorities as to who would fund repairs. Onward connections are now by bus.

== Train services ==
The station is served by regional trains towards Bordeaux, Brive-la-Gaillarde and Limoges.

Preceding station	TER Nouvelle-Aquitaine	Following station
Meymac towards Limoges	26	Terminus
Meymac towards Brive-la-Gaillarde	27	Terminus
Meymac towards Bordeaux	32	Terminus

== Bus services ==
Bus services operate from Ussel to Felletin, Montluçon and Bort-les-Orgues.

== Gallery ==
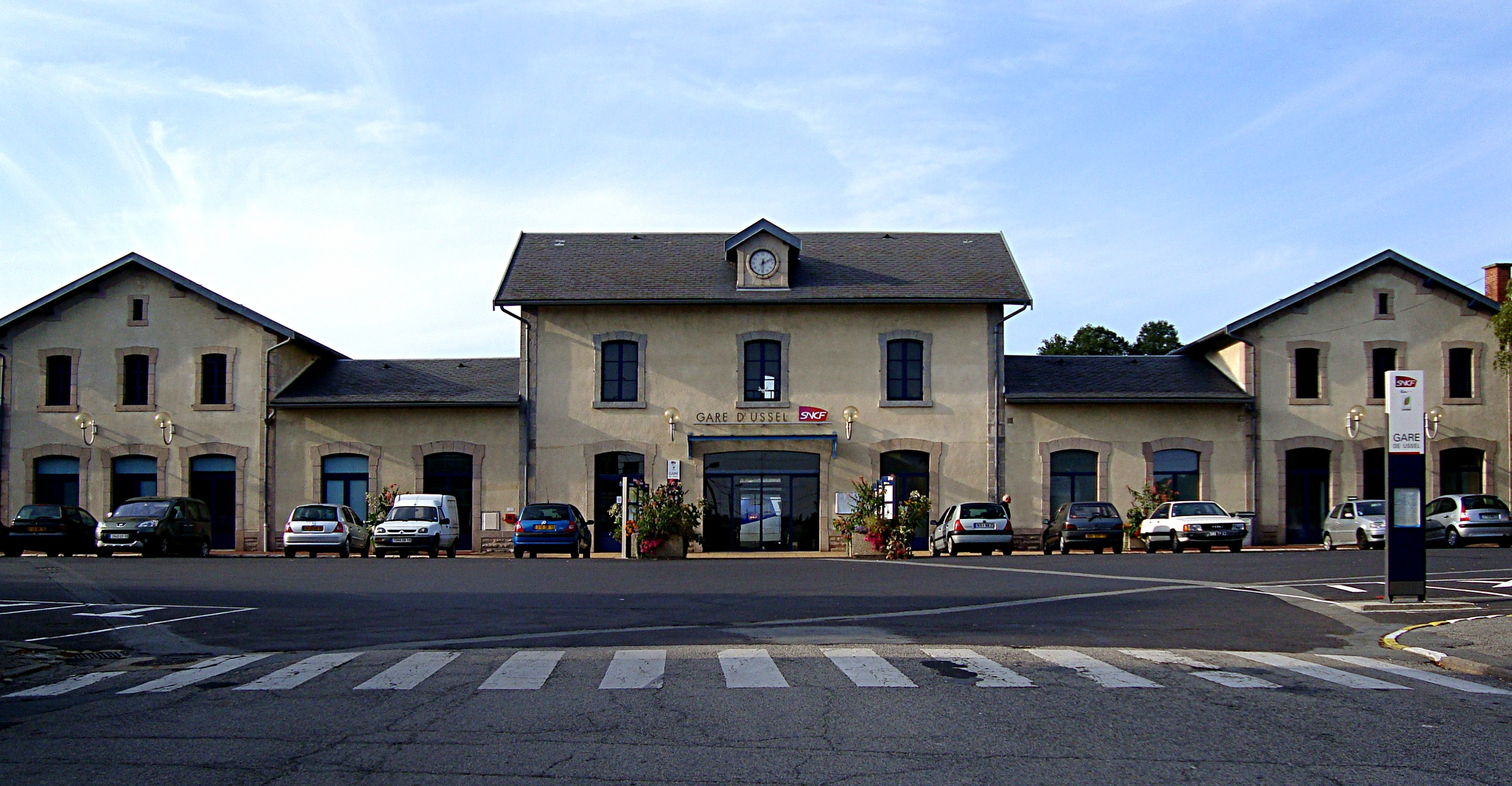
The station

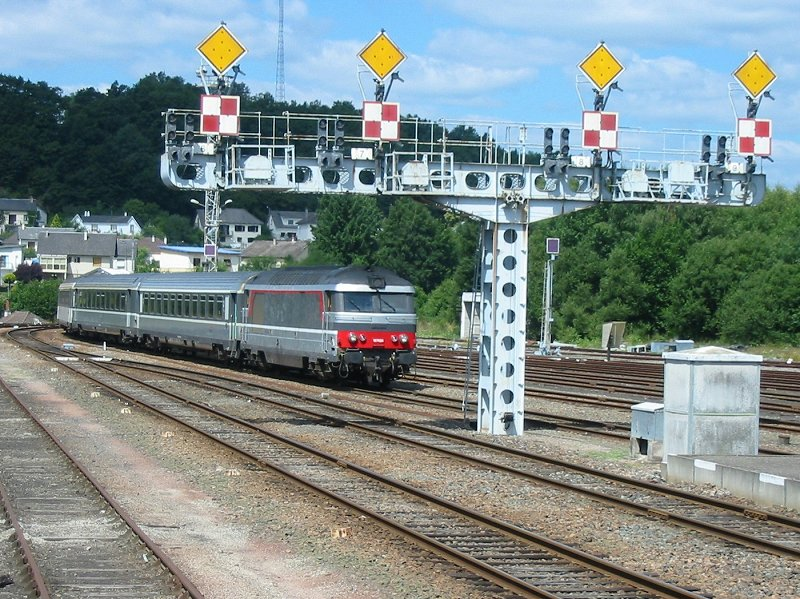
A Corail Intercity arriving at the station

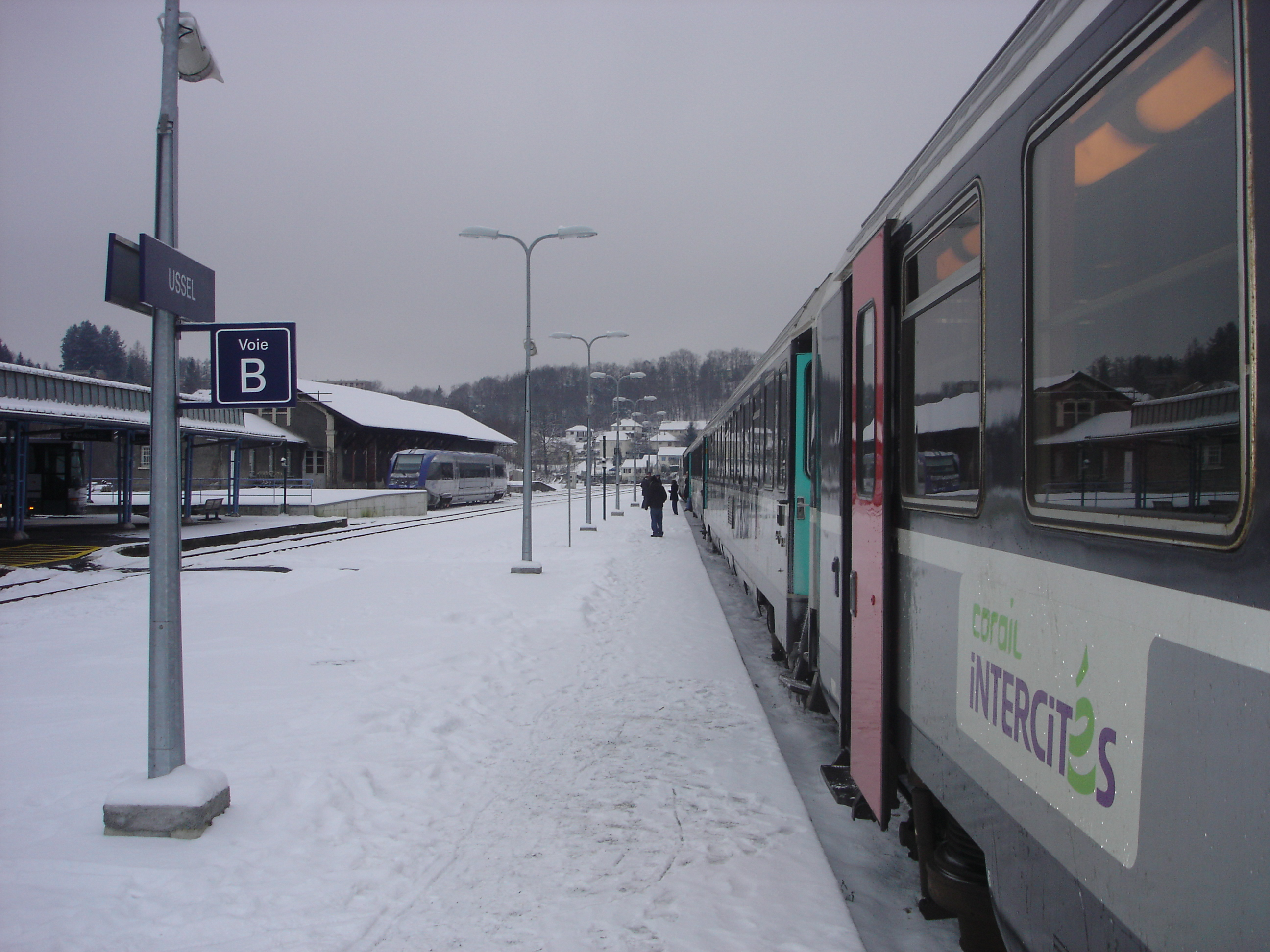
A train waiting at the station
