= Cantons of the Corrèze department =

The following is a list of the 19 cantons of the Corrèze department, in France, following the French canton reorganisation which came into effect in March 2015:

- Allassac
- Argentat-sur-Dordogne
- Brive-la-Gaillarde-1
- Brive-la-Gaillarde-2
- Brive-la-Gaillarde-3
- Brive-la-Gaillarde-4
- Égletons
- Haute-Dordogne
- Malemort
- Midi Corrézien
- Naves
- Plateau de Millevaches
- Saint-Pantaléon-de-Larche
- Sainte-Fortunade
- Seilhac-Monédières
- Tulle
- Ussel
- Uzerche
- L'Yssandonnais
