= Bernadette Chirac =

French politician (1933–2026)

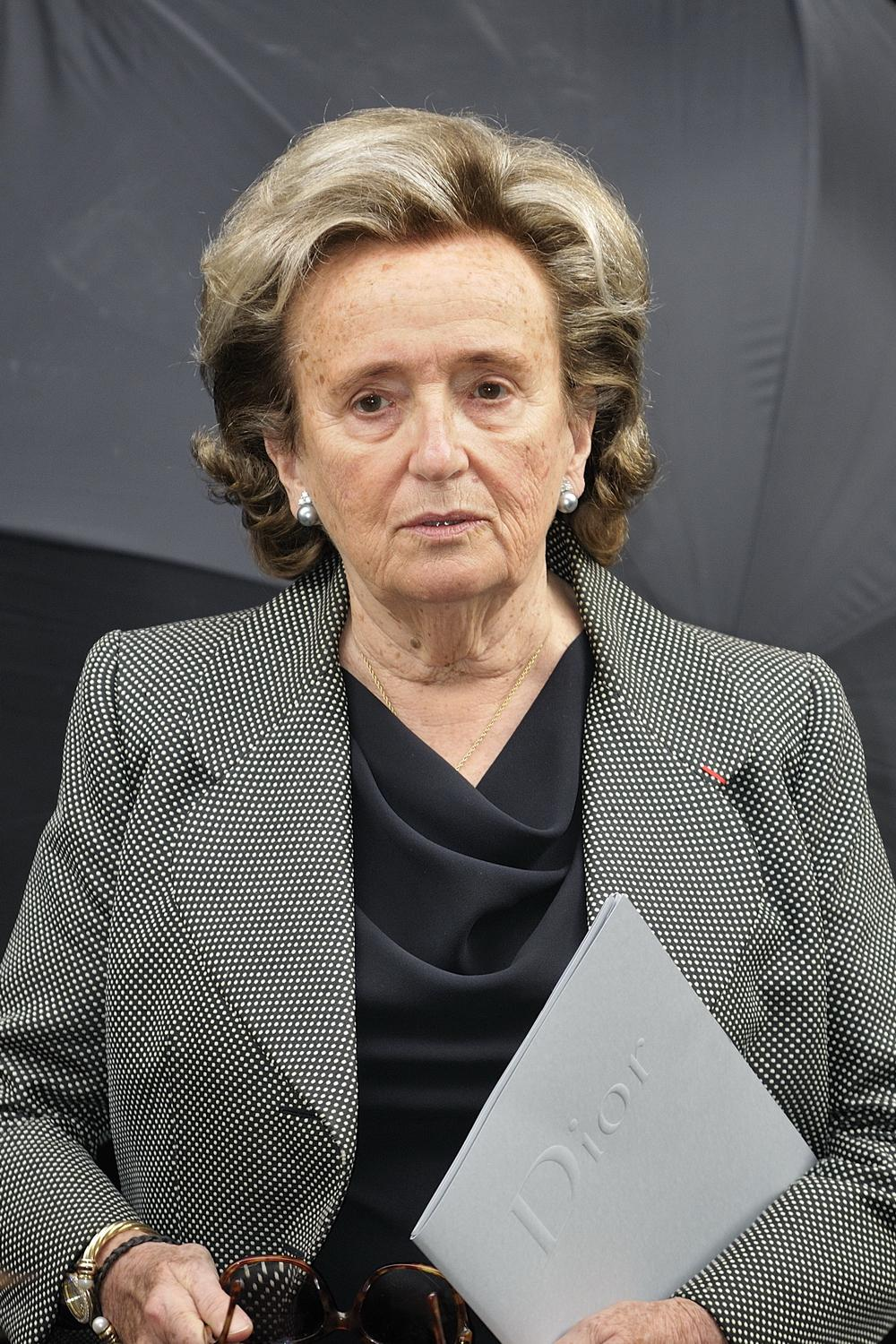
- Chirac in 2009

Spouse of the President of France
- In role 17 May 1995 – 16 May 2007
- President: Jacques Chirac
- Preceded by: Danielle Mitterrand
- Succeeded by: Cécilia Sarkozy

Personal details
- Born: Bernadette Thérèse Marie Chodron de Courcel; 18 May 1933 Paris, France
- Died: 5 June 2026 (aged 93) Rueil-Malmaison, France
- Resting place: Montparnasse Cemetery, Paris
- Party: UDR (1971–1976); RPR (1976–2002); UMP (2002–2015); LR (from 2015)
- Spouse: Jacques Chirac (m. 1956; died 2019)
- Children: 3, including Claude Chirac and Anh Dao Traxel (foster daughter)

Bernadette Thérèse Marie Chirac (French pronunciation: [bɛʁnadɛt teʁɛz maʁi ʃiʁak]; née Chodron de Courcel; 18 May 1933 – 5 June 2026) was a French politician who was active in the local politics of Corrèze and was the wife of President Jacques Chirac. She was the head of the charity Opération Pièces jaunes from 1994 to 2019.

== Early life and education ==
Bernadette Thérèse Chodron de Courcel was born in the 16th arrondissement of Paris on 18 May 1933, into a wealthy family. She attended Sciences Po and met Jacques Chirac in 1951. The couple married at the Sainte-Clotilde Chapel in 1956 despite the objections of Bernadette's parents. She dropped out of college in order to support Jacques attending the École nationale d'administration.

Chirac sought an archaeology degree in 1972 despite objections from Jacques.

== Career ==
=== Politics ===
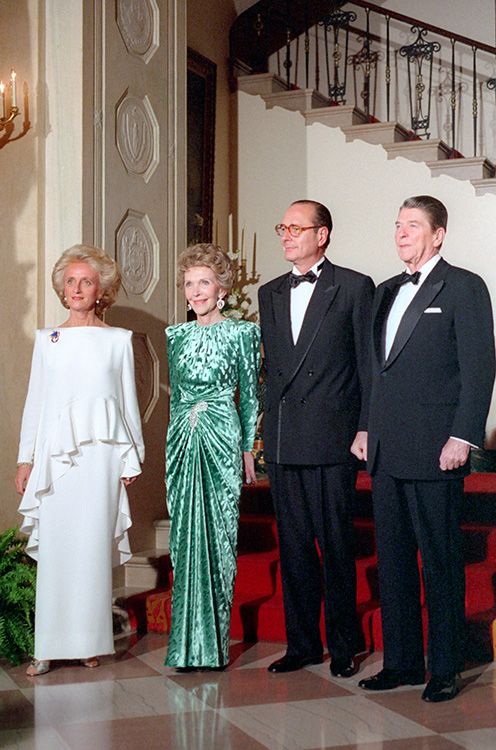
(R–L:) Ronald Reagan, Jacques Chirac, Nancy Reagan and Bernadette Chirac (White House, 31 March 1987).

In 1971, Chirac was elected as a municipal councilor in Sarran. She served as a general councilor in Corrèze from 1979 to 2015; she was the first woman to serve as a councilor in Corrèze. Her constituency was disestablished by cantonal redistricting and she had to run as a substitute candidate for Lilith Pittman in Canton of Brive-la-Gaillarde-2 in the 2015 election. Pittman and Francis Colasson won in the second round.

Jacques won the presidency in the 1995 election. Catholic philosopher Jean Guitton referred to Chirac as the last queen of France. She did not trust Dominique de Villepin and gave him the nickname Nero.

Chirac called for Nicolas Sarkozy to run in the 2017 presidential election.

=== Charity ===
Opération Pièces jaunes, a charity that supported children in hospitals, was led by Chirac from 1994 to 2019. Chirac became honorary president in 2019, and gave control over the organisation to Brigitte Macron, the wife of President Emmanuel Macron.

Starting in the 1980s Chirac raised money for research into anorexia nervosa. Maison de Solenn, a specialised clinic for anorexics, was established with Chirac's support in 2004.

== Personal life ==
Chirac had maternal descent from Samuel Bernard, who was a banker for King Louis XIV.

The Chiracs had two daughters. Their younger daughter, Claude Chirac, became a press and political adviser for her father. The elder, Laurence, suffered from anorexia following a bout of meningitis and reportedly attempted suicide numerous times before dying from cardiac arrest in 2016. Although Jacques participated in several extramarital affairs, Chirac remained married to him, citing both her Catholic faith and her enduring affection for her husband.

In 1979, the Chiracs took in Anh Đào Traxel, a 21-year-old Vietnamese boat-person refugee, after encountering her among a crowd of refugees at Charles de Gaulle Airport. Although they never formally adopted her, the couple housed her for two years and employed her in the city hall of Paris for 18 years. Đào named her three children after the Chiracs.

After Jacques was hospitalized for a lung infection in 2016, Chirac was admitted to the Pitié-Salpêtrière Hospital for rest, as the strain of Laurence's death and her husband's illness had left her exhausted. She made her last public appearance in 2018 when a street in Brive-la-Gaillarde was named in honour of the Chirac family. Following Jacques' death in 2019, she was unable to attend his state funeral because of her declining health.

Chirac died at Line Renaud's house in Rueil-Malmaison on 5 June 2026. Her funeral was held at the Basilica of Sainte-Clotilde, Paris on 12 June. The French government was represented at her funeral by Minister Catherine Vautrin. She was buried at her family's plot in Montparnasse Cemetery.

== Honours ==
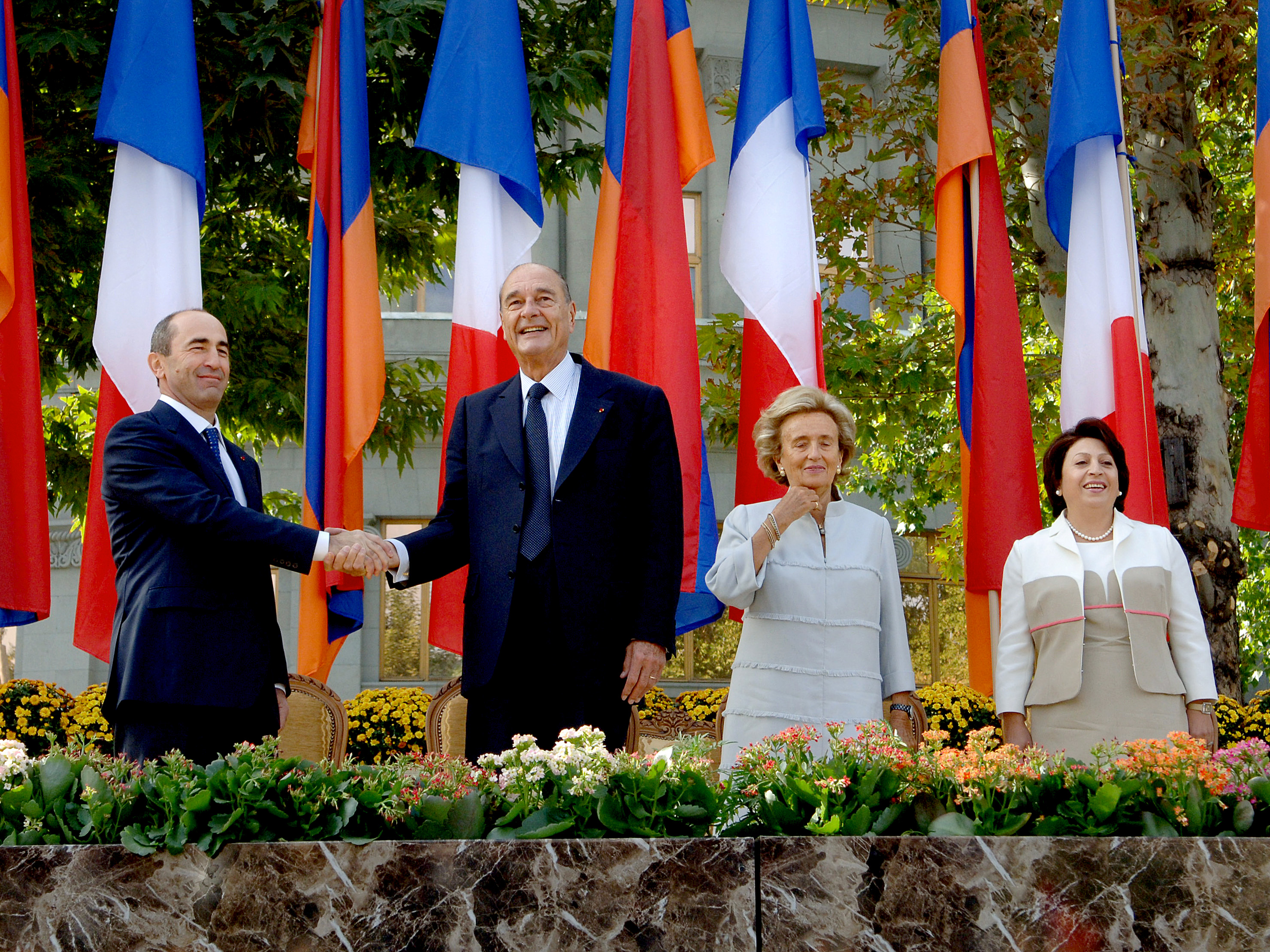
Robert Kocharyan, Jacques Chirac, Bella Kocharyan and Bernadette Chirac in Yerevan (30 September 2006).

- Dame Grand Cross of the Order of Charles III (Spain)
- Grand Cross of the Royal Norwegian Order of Merit (Norway)
- Medal of Pushkin (Russia)
- Knight of the Order of the Smile (Poland)
- Officier of the Legion of Honour (France)

== Bibliography ==
- 2001: Bernadette Chirac by Bertrand Meyer-Stabley (Perrin Edition), ISBN 978-2-262-01809-2
- 2006: La Fille de Cœur by Anh Đào Traxel (Flammarion Editions), ISBN 978-2-08-068894-1 (a biography of the Chirac family by their foster daughter).
- 2001: Conversation by Bernadette Chirac, with Patrick de Carolis (Plon Editions), ISBN 978-2-259-19512-6

== Works cited ==
=== News ===
- "Bernadette Chirac joins calls for Nicolas Sarkozy to run again". The Daily Telegraph. 17 February 2013. Archived from the original on 19 February 2013.
- "Bernadette Chirac reçoit la Légion d'honneur". Le Figaro. 24 March 2008. Archived from the original on 19 April 2019.
- "Chirac's wife hospitalised as ex-French leader remains ill". Radio France Internationale. 22 September 2016. Archived from the original on 1 February 2026.
- "Départementales 2015: Bernadette Chirac en tête à Brive". Le Figaro. 23 March 2015. Archived from the original on 22 April 2023.
- "Former French President Chirac's wife hospitalised 'for rest'". France 24. 21 September 2016. Archived from the original on 27 April 2025.
- "France lays to rest former first lady Bernadette Chirac". Le Monde. 12 June 2026. Archived from the original on 16 June 2026.
- "Un tee-shirt à l'effigie de Jacques Chirac remarqué sur Lilith Pittman à Brive (Corrèze)". La Montagne. 9 May 2021. Archived from the original on 16 June 2026.
- Adamson, Thomas (6 June 2026). "Bernadette Chirac, formidable former first lady of France who built power of her own, dies at 93". Associated Press. Archived from the original on 6 June 2026.
- Bremner, Charles (21 July 2005). "Troubled Chirac's adopted daughter rides to his rescue". The Times. Archived from the original on 4 June 2011.
- Buffery, Vicky (10 February 2011). "Chirac's dowdy wife suddenly hip later in life". Reuters.
- Gurrey, Béatrice (5 June 2026). "Death of Bernadette Chirac A liberated voice: 'I'm like my snakeskin bag: I bite'". Le Monde. Archived from the original on 16 June 2026.
- Lichfield, John (15 April 2016). "Laurence Chirac, 'lost' daughter of the former French president, dies". The Independent. Archived from the original on 30 March 2026.
- Mazalon, Fanny (12 June 2026). "Bernadette Chirac s'est éteinte chez Line Renaud, dans son « petit paradis d'amour »". Paris Match. Archived from the original on 16 June 2026.
- Willsher, Kim (6 June 2026). "Bernadette Chirac, formidable former first lady of France, dies aged 93". The Guardian. Archived from the original on 16 June 2026.
- Willsher, Kim (8 July 2023). "Catherine Deneuve to portray Bernadette Chirac in satirical film". The Guardian. Archived from the original on 8 July 2023.

=== Web ===
- "Chirac Bernadette". Order of the Smile. Archived from the original on 12 December 2025.
- "Correze (19) – canton de Brive-la-Gaillarde-2 (04)". Minister of the Interior. Archived from the original on 24 March 2025.
- "Decree of the President of the Russian Federation of December 4, 2007, No. 1631". Government of Russia. Archived from the original on 14 August 2016.
- "Øystein Hovdkinn". Norwegian royal family. Archived from the original on 12 December 2025.
- "Royal Decree 378/2006". Agencia Estatal Boletín Oficial del Estado. Archived from the original on 12 December 2025.

Unofficial roles
Preceded by Danielle Mitterrand	Spouse of the President of France; 1995–2007	Succeeded by Cécilia Sarkozy
