= Jugeals-Nazareth =

- Commune
- Coat of arms
- Location of Jugeals-Nazareth
- Location within France Location within Nouvelle-Aquitaine
- Coordinates: 45°04′56″N 1°33′37″E
- Country: France
- Region: Nouvelle-Aquitaine
- Department: Corrèze
- Arrondissement: Brive-la-Gaillarde
- Canton: Saint-Pantaléon-de-Larche
- Intercommunality: CA Bassin de Brive

Government
  - Mayor (2026–32): Marilyn Bornes
- Area^{1}: 10.95 km^{2} (4.23 sq mi)
- Elevation: 300 m (980 ft)
- Highest elevation: 343 m (1,125 ft)
- Lowest elevation: 193 m (633 ft)
- Population (2023): 943
  - Density: 86.1/km^{2} (223/sq mi)
- Time zone: UTC+01:00 (CET)
  - Summer (DST): UTC+02:00 (CEST)
- INSEE/Postal code: 19093 /19500
- ^{1} French Land Register data, which excludes lakes, ponds, glaciers > 1 km^{2} (0.386 sq mi or 247 acres) and river estuaries.

Jugeals-Nazareth (French pronunciation: [ʒyʒal nazaʁɛt]; Occitan: Jutjal e Nasareth) is a commune in the Corrèze department in central France.

From 1933 to 1935, the village of Jugeals-Nazareth hosted Makhar, the only Jewish kibbutz in France.

== Toponymy ==
Jugeals-Nazareth's "Nazareth" locality is from the time of the Crusades in the Middle Ages.

== History ==
=== Medieval times ===
On the return of Raymond I, a Viscount of Turenne, from the holy land after the First Crusade, he created a leper hospital and named it Nazareth which would be administrated by the Knights Templar.

=== 20th century ===
In 1933, young Jews fleeing the Hitler regime settled there and created a collective farm, a kibbutz called Makhar. They left their farm in 1935.

During the German occupation, the commune was home to a maquis camp, the Grandel group, near the hamlet of La Vapaudie. Édouard Valéry was the future departmental head of the Francs-tireurs et partisans (FTP).

== Geography ==
The commune is located in the Brive-la-Gaillarde catchment area. The commune is watered by the Planchetorte stream and the Couze, which have their sources there, and bordered to the south-east by the Tourmente.

Jugeals-Nazareth is the result of the merger of the commune of Jugeals and the locality of Nazareth in 1924. Jugeals was an old parish that became common during the French Revolution. Nazareth remained a locality in the commune of Turenne, although very close to Jugeals. This proximity led its inhabitants to ask for their attachment to Jugeals for greater convenience, the town hall being on the other side of the road and that of Turenne six kilometres away.

=== Population ===
Historical population
Year	Pop.	±% p.a.
1968	241	—
1975	311	+3.71%
1982	502	+7.08%
1990	604	+2.34%
1999	687	+1.44%
2007	802	+1.95%
2012	902	+2.38%
2017	972	+1.51%
2023	943	−0.50%
Source: INSEE

== Local culture and heritage ==
=== Places and monuments ===
- L'église Saint-Gilles d'Athènes de Jugeals - a church from the Romanesque period. The choir vault decorated with wall paintings was classified as a historical monument in 1928;
- The Chapelle Notre-Dame-de-Nazareth - 12th century ex-voto chapel;
- Marcelin-Bachier stadium.

== See also ==
- Communes of the Corrèze department
