= Hôtel de Ville, Brive-la-Gaillarde =

Town hall in Brive-la-Gaillarde, France

Hôtel de Ville
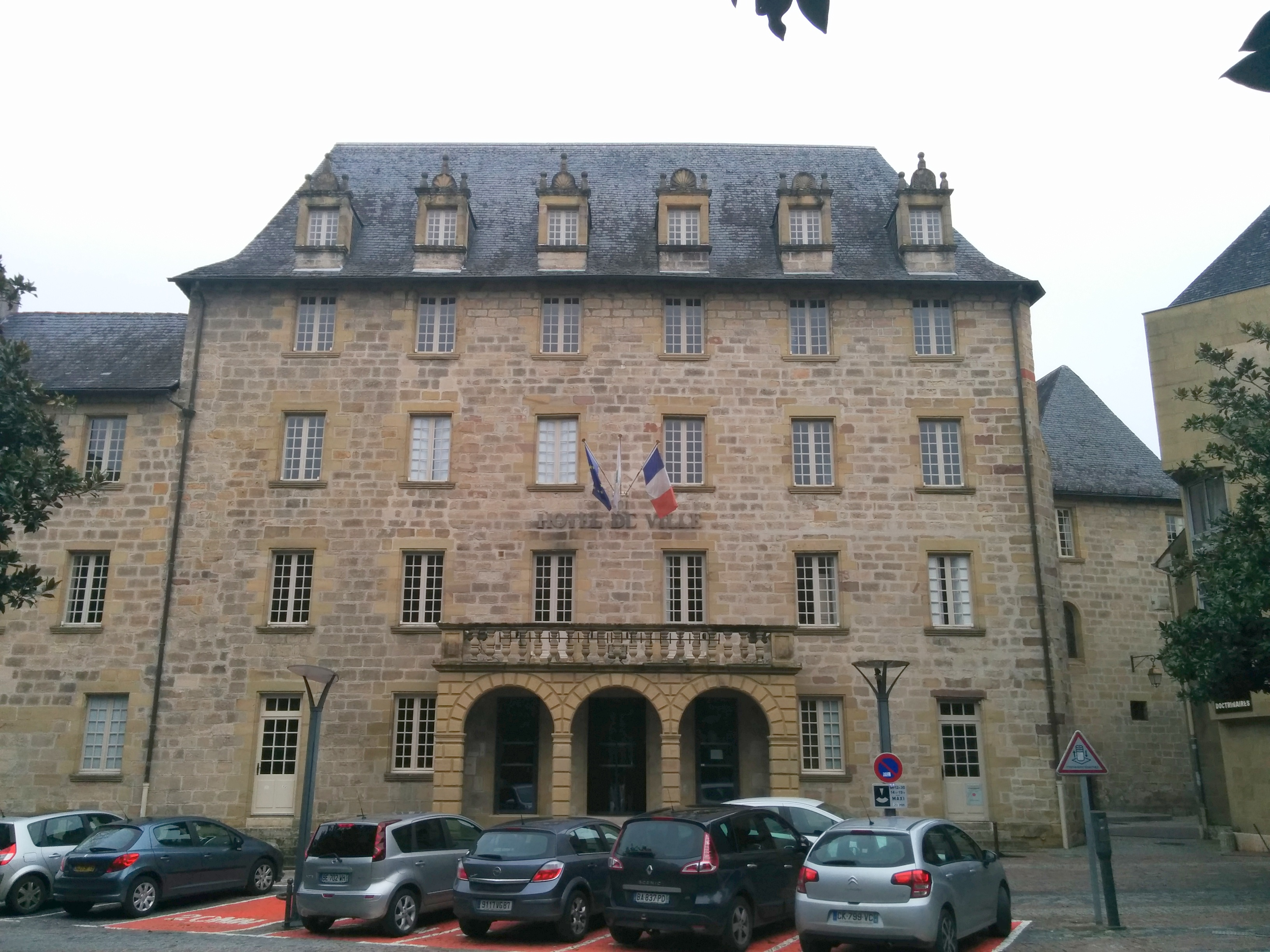
- The main frontage of the Hôtel de Ville in January 2014

General information
- Type: City hall
- Architectural style: Neoclassical style
- Location: Brive-la-Gaillarde, France
- Coordinates: 45.1595°N 1.5339°E
- Completed: 1671

Monument historique
- Official name: Ancien Collège des Doctrinaires ou ancien collège de jeunes filles
- Type: Inscrit
- Designated: 1926
- Reference no.: PA00099690

The Hôtel de Ville (French pronunciation: [otɛl də vil], City Hall) is a municipal building in Brive-la-Gaillarde, Corrèze in southwestern France, standing on Place de l'Hôtel de Ville. It was designated a monument historique by the French government in 1926.

== History ==
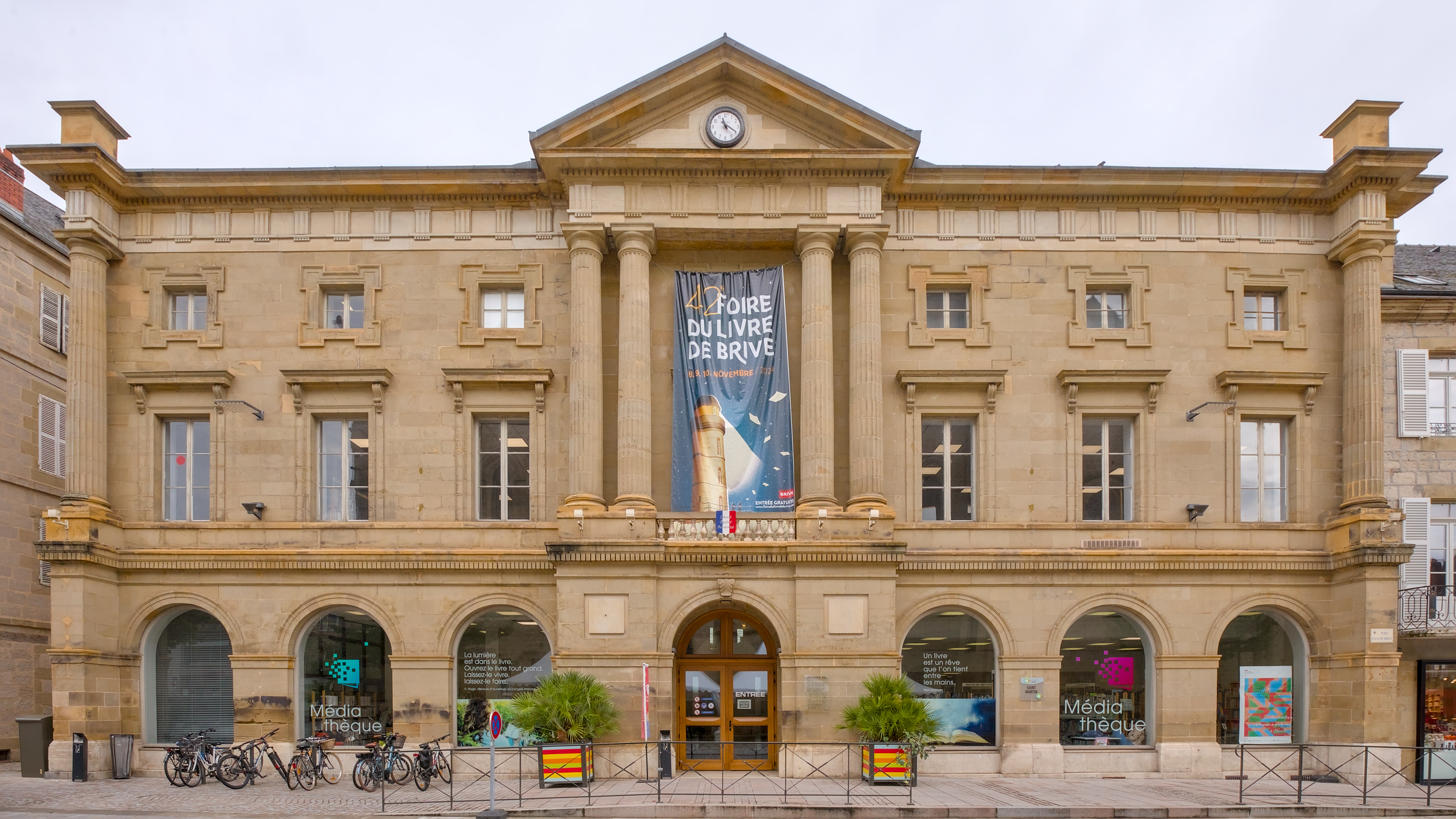
The old town hall

After the French Revolution, the town council of Brive initially met at the home of the mayor at that time. However, in 1842, the council decided to commission a dedicated town hall. The site it selected had been occupied by the north wing of the Priory of Saint-Martin. The new building was designed by the municipal architect, Charles Albrizio, in the neoclassical style, built in ashlar stone from Gramont and was completed in 1851.

The design involved a symmetrical main frontage of seven bays facing onto what is now Place Charles de Gaulle. The central bay, which was slightly projected forward, featured a round headed opening on the ground floor, a French door with a balustraded balcony on the first floor and a small square window on the second floor. The central bay was flanked by piers which supported pairs of fluted Doric order columns, spanning the first and second floors. At roof level, there was an entablature with triglyphs, a modillioned cornice and, above the central bay, there was a pediment with a clock in the tympanum. There were also piers, supporting fluted Doric order columns spanning the first and second floors, at the corners of the building. The other bays were fenestrated in a similar style. During the 19th century, the ground floor was occupied by shops. The building became a library in 1976 and is now the local médiathèque.

During the Second World War, the town hall staff were active in supporting the French Resistance: they arranged a false identity for the Special Operations Executive operative, Jacques Poirier. He reconnoitred landing grounds and sites for arms dumps for the local resistance group, the Maquis du Limousin. Brive went on to become the first town in the area to be liberated by its own means.

In the early 1970s, the council decided to acquire a larger municipal building. The site it selected was the former Collège des Doctrinaires (College of Doctrinaires). The college was founded by the president of the Parlement of Toulouse, Antoine de Lestang, who donated his home to the Christian Doctrine Fathers in the mid-17th century. Work on the new building started in 1659. It was designed in the neoclassical style, built in rubble masonry and was completed in 1671.

The design involved a symmetrical main frontage of seven bays facing onto what is now Place de l'Hôtel de Ville. A single-storey portico was erected in front of the central three bays. The five storey building was fenestrated by casement windows on the first four floors and by dormer windows surmounted by acroteria and finials at attic level. After the Bishop of Alet, Étienne de Polverel, made an adjacent property available two years later, the first of two wings was added to the east of the original building, so creating a courtyard behind it. Notable people who studied at the college included Cardinal Guillaume Dubois in the 17th century, and Marshal Guillaume Brune in the 18th century.

During the French Revolution, the building was seized by the state and the priests were driven out in 1790. It served as a boys' school from 1803 until the boys relocated to the Collège Cabanis (now the Collège d'Arsonval) in 1887, and then served as a girls' school from 1888 until it closed in 1947. It was converted for municipal purposes in 1974. The former college chapel became the Salle d'Honneur (Room of Honour) and, as such, a venue for wedding ceremonies.
