= Nespouls =

- Commune
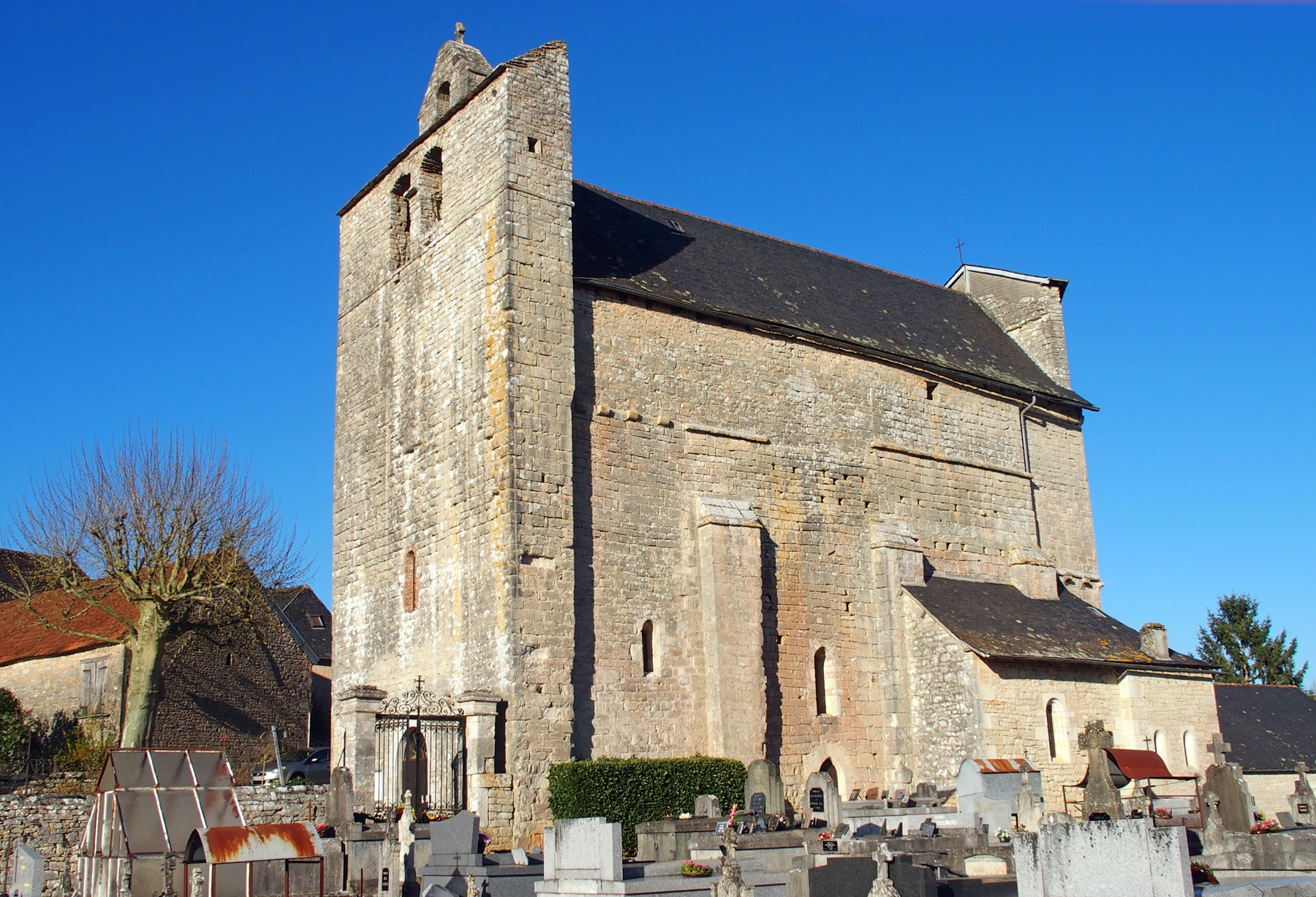
- The fortified church of Saint-Julien, in Nespouls

- Coat of arms
- Location of Nespouls
- Location within France Location within Nouvelle-Aquitaine
- Coordinates: 45°03′02″N 1°30′12″E
- Country: France
- Region: Nouvelle-Aquitaine
- Department: Corrèze
- Arrondissement: Brive-la-Gaillarde
- Canton: Saint-Pantaléon-de-Larche
- Intercommunality: CA Bassin de Brive

Government
  - Mayor (2020–2026): François Patier
- Area^{1}: 20.14 km^{2} (7.78 sq mi)
- Elevation: 300 m (980 ft)
- Highest elevation: 366 m (1,201 ft)
- Lowest elevation: 203 m (666 ft)
- Population (2023): 638
  - Density: 31.7/km^{2} (82.0/sq mi)
- Time zone: UTC+01:00 (CET)
  - Summer (DST): UTC+02:00 (CEST)
- INSEE/Postal code: 19147 /19600
- ^{1} French Land Register data, which excludes lakes, ponds, glaciers > 1 km^{2} (0.386 sq mi or 247 acres) and river estuaries.

Nespouls (French pronunciation: [nɛspul]; Occitan: Nespols) is a commune in the Corrèze department in central France.

== Population ==
Historical population
Year	Pop.	±% p.a.
1968	348	—
1975	340	−0.33%
1982	358	+0.74%
1990	413	+1.80%
1999	503	+2.21%
2007	594	+2.10%
2012	651	+1.85%
2017	635	−0.50%
2023	638	+0.08%
Source: INSEE

== See also ==
- Communes of the Corrèze department
