= Traxel =

Traxel is a surname. Notable people with the surname include:

- Anh Dao Traxel (born 1957), Vietnamese-born foster daughter of former French president
- Ernst Traxel (born 1933), Swiss racing cyclist
- Josef Traxel (1916–1975), German operatic tenor
