= Arrondissements of the Corrèze department =

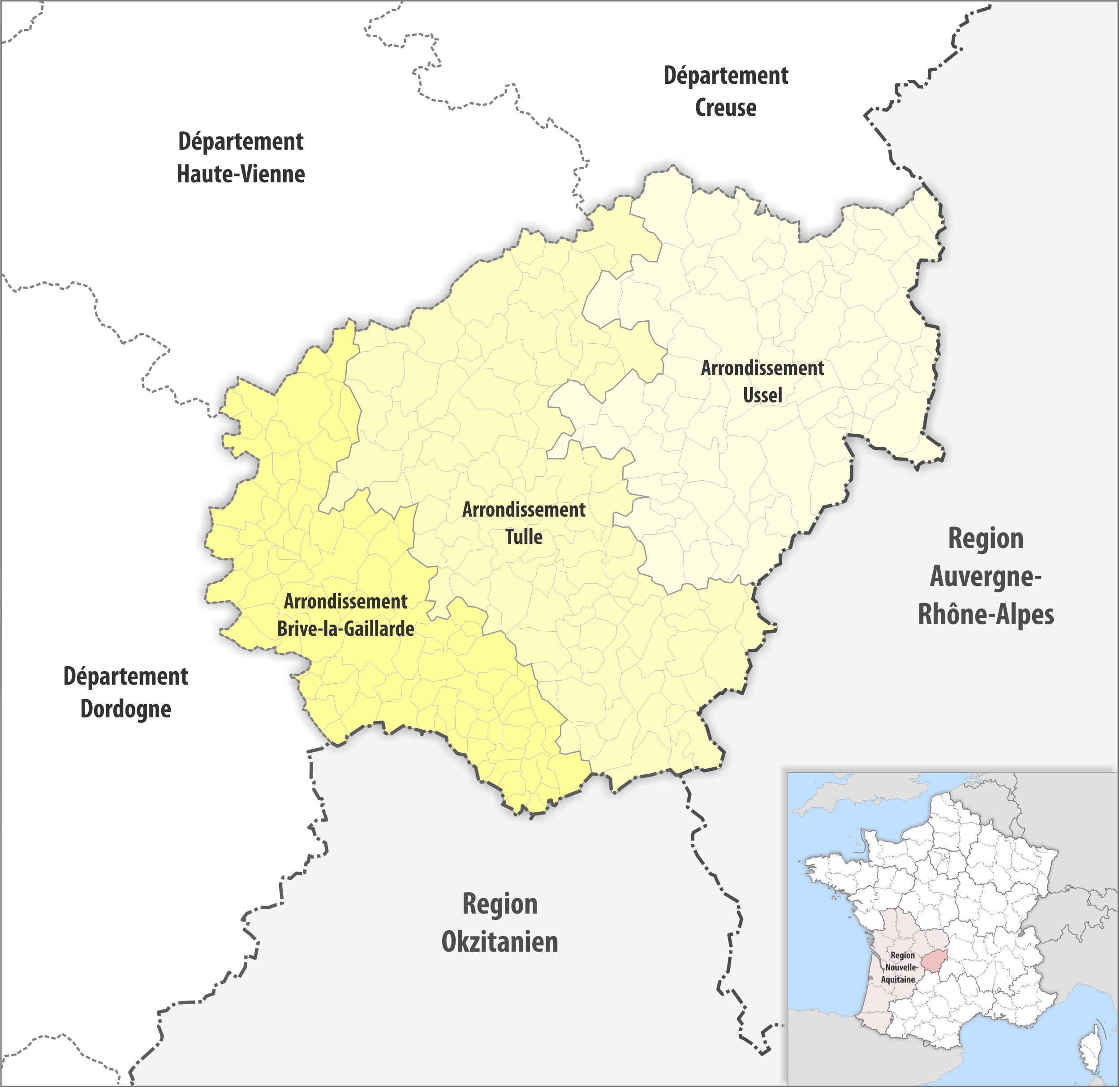
Map of arrondissements of the Corrèze department.

The 3 arrondissements of the Corrèze department are:

1. Arrondissement of Brive-la-Gaillarde, (subprefecture: Brive-la-Gaillarde) with 96 communes. The population of the arrondissement was 128,968 in 2021.
2. Arrondissement of Tulle, (prefecture of the Corrèze department: Tulle) with 105 communes. The population of the arrondissement was 70,680 in 2021.
3. Arrondissement of Ussel, (subprefecture: Ussel) with 78 communes. The population of the arrondissement was 40,136 in 2021.

== History ==
In 1800 the arrondissements of Tulle, Brive and Ussel were established. The arrondissement of Ussel was disbanded in 1926, and restored in 1943.

The borders of the arrondissements of Corrèze were modified in January 2017:

- three communes from the arrondissement of Brive-la-Gaillarde to the arrondissement of Tulle
- two communes from the arrondissement of Tulle to the arrondissement of Brive-la-Gaillarde
- 19 communes from the arrondissement of Tulle to the arrondissement of Ussel
- eight communes from the arrondissement of Ussel to the arrondissement of Tulle
