= Philippe Nauche =

French politician

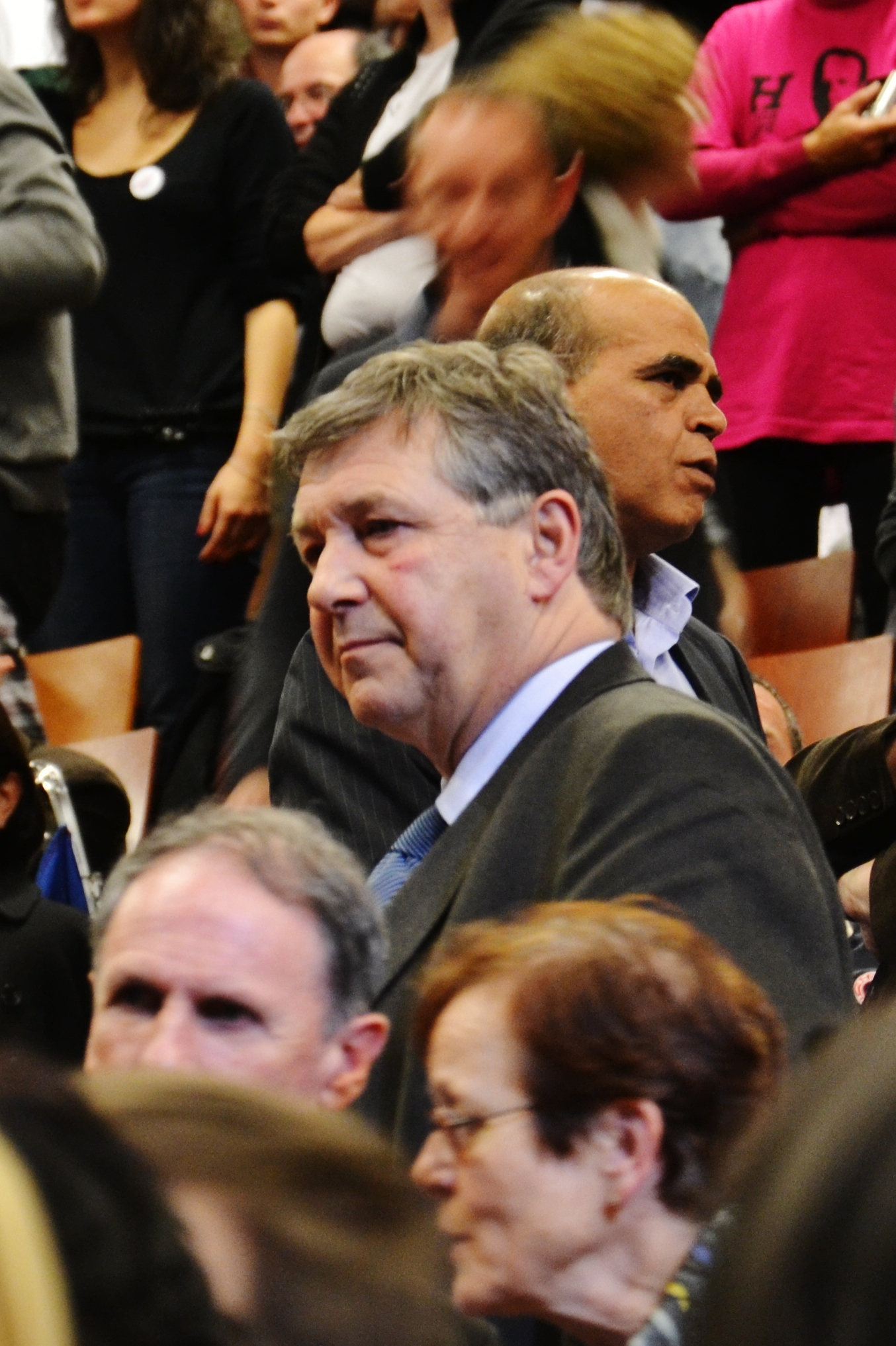
- Philippe Nauche

Deputy of the National Assembly for Corrèze's 2nd Constituency
- In office 20 June 2007 – 2017
- Preceded by: Frédéric Soulier
- Succeeded by: Frédérique Meunier
- In office 12 June 1997 – 20 June 2002
- Preceded by: Bernard Murat
- Succeeded by: Frédéric Soulier

Personal details
- Born: 15 July 1957 (age 68) Brive-la-Gaillarde, France
- Political party: Socialist Party
- Occupation: Doctor

Philippe Nauche (born July 15, 1957) was a member of the National Assembly of France. He represented Corrèze's 2nd Constituency for two separate periods. From 1997 to 2002 and again from 2007 to 2017, as a member of the Socialiste, radical, citoyen et divers gauche.

He lost his seat in the 2017 election.
