= Cosnac =

- Commune
- Coat of arms
- Location of Cosnac
- Location within France Location within Nouvelle-Aquitaine
- Coordinates: 45°08′05″N 1°35′11″E
- Country: France
- Region: Nouvelle-Aquitaine
- Department: Corrèze
- Arrondissement: Brive-la-Gaillarde
- Canton: Brive-la-Gaillarde-3
- Intercommunality: CA Bassin de Brive

Government
  - Mayor (2026–32): Gérard Soler
- Area^{1}: 19.98 km^{2} (7.71 sq mi)
- Elevation: 214 m (702 ft)
- Highest elevation: 381 m (1,250 ft)
- Lowest elevation: 134 m (440 ft)
- Population (2023): 3,044
  - Density: 152.4/km^{2} (394.6/sq mi)
- Time zone: UTC+01:00 (CET)
  - Summer (DST): UTC+02:00 (CEST)
- INSEE/Postal code: 19063 /19360
- ^{1} French Land Register data, which excludes lakes, ponds, glaciers > 1 km^{2} (0.386 sq mi or 247 acres) and river estuaries.

Cosnac (French pronunciation: [konak]) is a commune in the Corrèze department in central France. It belongs to the Communauté d'agglomération du Bassin de Brive. The commune is located just east of Brive-la-Gaillarde, a sub-prefecture of the Corrèze, the two communes being bordering.

Its inhabitants are called Cosnacois.

== History ==
The first mention of Cosnac is in 913 and again 969 as a parish in the Cartulary of the Abbey of Tulle. The rise of the lords of Cosnac appear more prominently between 1250 to 1316 when they repurchased fiefs from the lords of Turenne and Malemort. The current church was built around 1300 as was the first mention of a chateau on the site. The de Cosnac family was admitted into the Honneurs de la Cour on 10 April 1782 recognising it as an ancient family.

During the French Revolution the village was temporally renamed L'Égalité. The Cosnac family became émigré's but eventually returned. The chateau was eventually bought by the De Chalup family but by the 1960s, the chateau had been abandoned. Eventually it was bought by investors and turned into private apartments.

== Population ==
Historical population
Year	Pop.	±% p.a.
1968	592	—
1975	819	+4.75%
1982	1,452	+8.52%
1990	1,962	+3.83%
1999	2,340	+1.98%
2007	2,824	+2.38%
2012	2,935	+0.77%
2017	2,981	+0.31%
2023	3,044	+0.35%
Source: INSEE

== Local culture and heritage ==
=== Places and monuments ===
- The caves of Maranzat - inhabited as early as 10,000BC;
- The Troglodyte dwellings of Les Roches (still inhabited) (11th and 13th centuries);
- Chateau de Cosnac - (14th century) listed as a historical monument on 20 October 1987, tapestries by Van Eyck at the Labenche Museum in Brive-La-Gaillarde. The chateau's façade was reconstructed in the 1700's, designed by architect Germain Boffrand.
- The Église Saint-Just (12th century) - close to the churches of South Corrèze of the early and mid 12th century. The apse of the church is dotted with stonemasons' marks like its religious counterparts in the area. The bell tower remains one of the characteristics of this religious architecture which is also found in the neighbouring departments. It is listed as a historical monument in 2024.
  - The interior of the church is marked by a clear architectural restructuring with the old groin vaults only visible on the walls. This building was rebuilt during the 19th century in white sandstone blocks in the transept.
  - The ceiling of this church is decorated with a painting by Rossi executed in 1836 following restoration in 1834. It is an Italian-style painting measuring 20.30 m by 6.30 m, made by a trompe-l'oeil and representing the themes of heaven and the apostles.
- The funeral chapel of the de Chalup and Cosnac families (14th century).

== Notable persons ==
- Pierre-Jean-Georges Cabanis (born in Cosnac in 1757 - died in Seraincourt in 1808), physician, physiologist and philosopher.
- Daniel de Cosnac (1628-1708) - clergyman, archbishop of Aix.
- Bertrand de Cosnac (c.1310-1374) - bishop of Lombez, Saint-Bertrand de Comminges and then of Tulle, jurist, treasurer and papal legate, cardinal with the title of Saint-Marcel (1371-1374), known as the cardinal of Comminges.
- Thérèse Menot (born in Cosnac in 1923) - resistance fighter deported to Ravensbrück.

== See also ==
- Communes of the Corrèze department
