= Brive-la-Gaillarde =

Brive-la-Gaillarde Briva la Galharda (Occitan)
- Subprefecture and commune
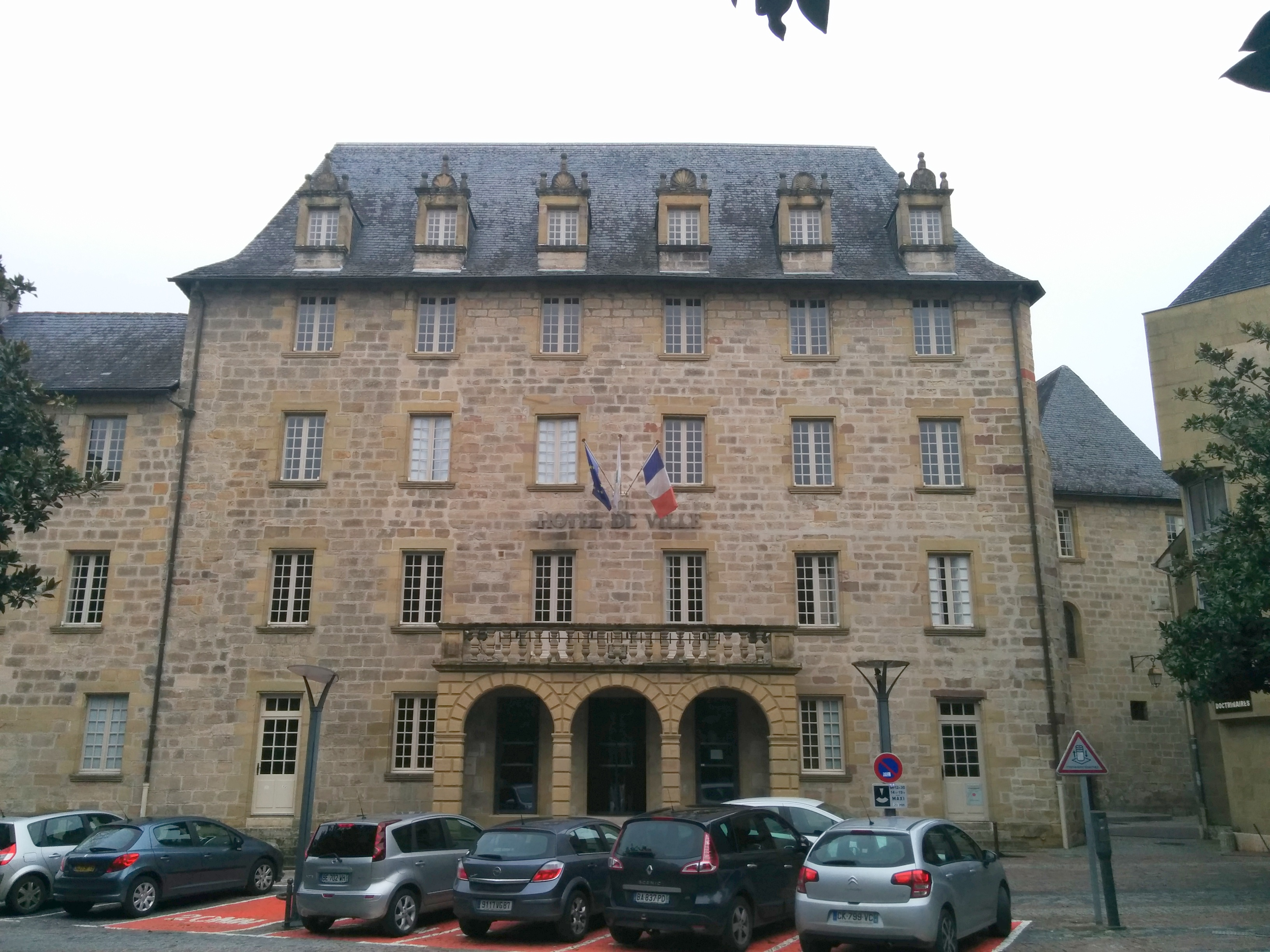
- The Hôtel de Ville

- Coat of arms
- Location of Brive-la-Gaillarde
- Location within France Location within Nouvelle-Aquitaine
- Coordinates: 45°09′30″N 1°31′56″E
- Country: France
- Region: Nouvelle-Aquitaine
- Department: Corrèze
- Arrondissement: Brive-la-Gaillarde
- Canton: Brive-la-Gaillarde-1, 2, 3 and 4
- Intercommunality: CA Bassin de Brive

Government
  - Mayor (2020–2026): Frédéric Soulier
- Area^{1}: 48.59 km^{2} (18.76 sq mi)
- Elevation: 142 m (466 ft)
- Highest elevation: 315 m (1,033 ft)
- Lowest elevation: 102 m (335 ft)
- Population (2023): 47,095
  - Density: 969.2/km^{2} (2,510/sq mi)
- Demonym: Brivistes
- Time zone: UTC+01:00 (CET)
  - Summer (DST): UTC+02:00 (CEST)
- INSEE/Postal code: 19031 /19100
- ^{1} French Land Register data, which excludes lakes, ponds, glaciers > 1 km^{2} (0.386 sq mi or 247 acres) and river estuaries.

Brive-la-Gaillarde (French pronunciation: [bʁiv la ɡajaʁd]; Limousin dialect of Occitan: Briva la Galharda), commonly known as simply Brive, is a commune of France. It is a sub-prefecture and the largest city of the Corrèze department. It has around 47,000 inhabitants, while the population of the agglomeration was 76,456 in 2022.

Although it is by far the biggest commune in Corrèze, the prefecture is Tulle. In French popular culture, the town is associated with a song by Georges Brassens.

== History ==
Even though the inhabitants settled around the 1st century, the city only started to grow much later. From around the 5th century onwards, the original city began to develop around a church dedicated to Saint-Martin-l'Espagnol. During the 12th century walls were built around the city and during the Hundred Years' War a second wall was built. These fortifications no longer exist and have been replaced by boulevards. The Hôtel de Ville was commissioned as the Collège des Doctrinaires (College of Doctrinaires) and completed in 1671.

The commune was named "Brive" until 1919, when it was renamed "Brive-la-Gaillarde". The word "gaillarde" (still used in modern French) probably stands for bravery or strength in the city's name, but it can also refer to the city's walls. Brive now extends outside of its original boundaries into Malemort and Ussac.

During World War II, Brive-la-Gaillarde was a regional capital of the Resistance, acting as a seat of several clandestine information networks and several of the principal resistance movements, including the Armée secrète (or "Secret Army") and the Mouvements Unis de la Résistance (or "United Movements of the Resistance"). On the evening of june 8, 1944 the vanguard of the 2nd SS Panzer Division *Das Reich* entered Brive, arriving from Noailles.

Brive-la-Gaillarde was the first city of Occupied France to liberate itself by its own means, on 15 August 1944. For this, the city received the "Croix de guerre 1939–1945" military decoration.

The medieval centre is mainly a commercial district with retail shops and various cafés. It is also the location of the city hall, the main police station, and the Labenche museum. One notable landmark outside the inner city is the Pont Cardinal, a bridge which used to be a crossing point for travelers from Paris to Toulouse.

== Geography ==
=== Neighboring communes ===
The neighbouring communes are Chasteaux, Cosnac, Jugeals-Nazareth, Lissac-sur-Couze, Malemort, Noailles, Saint-Pantaléon-de-Larche and Ussac.

=== Climate ===
Brive-la-Gaillarde was classified as Cfb, according to the Köppen-Geiger climate classification, for the period 1991-2020, namely a temperate climate with warm summers and no dry season.

Climate data for Brive-la-Gaillarde (1991–2020 normals, extremes 1987–present)
Month	Jan	Feb	Mar	Apr	May	Jun	Jul	Aug	Sep	Oct	Nov	Dec	Year
Record high °C (°F)	19.5 (67.1)	25.0 (77.0)	27.1 (80.8)	30.0 (86.0)	32.9 (91.2)	39.6 (103.3)	42.1 (107.8)	40.8 (105.4)	37.5 (99.5)	33.2 (91.8)	25.6 (78.1)	20.1 (68.2)	42.1 (107.8)
Mean daily maximum °C (°F)	9.6 (49.3)	11.4 (52.5)	15.4 (59.7)	18.1 (64.6)	22.0 (71.6)	25.7 (78.3)	27.9 (82.2)	27.9 (82.2)	24.0 (75.2)	19.4 (66.9)	13.4 (56.1)	10.1 (50.2)	18.7 (65.7)
Daily mean °C (°F)	5.4 (41.7)	6.1 (43.0)	9.2 (48.6)	11.9 (53.4)	15.6 (60.1)	19.2 (66.6)	21.1 (70.0)	21.0 (69.8)	17.3 (63.1)	13.9 (57.0)	8.8 (47.8)	5.9 (42.6)	12.9 (55.2)
Mean daily minimum °C (°F)	1.3 (34.3)	0.8 (33.4)	3.1 (37.6)	5.6 (42.1)	9.2 (48.6)	12.6 (54.7)	14.3 (57.7)	14.0 (57.2)	10.6 (51.1)	8.3 (46.9)	4.3 (39.7)	1.7 (35.1)	7.2 (45.0)
Record low °C (°F)	−11.8 (10.8)	−16.4 (2.5)	−12.6 (9.3)	−5.4 (22.3)	−1.7 (28.9)	2.1 (35.8)	5.2 (41.4)	3.6 (38.5)	0.6 (33.1)	−5.6 (21.9)	−10.2 (13.6)	−13.4 (7.9)	−16.4 (2.5)
Average precipitation mm (inches)	73.9 (2.91)	59.5 (2.34)	66.4 (2.61)	87.5 (3.44)	87.1 (3.43)	78.4 (3.09)	63.1 (2.48)	67.4 (2.65)	73.4 (2.89)	79.5 (3.13)	85.1 (3.35)	82.6 (3.25)	903.9 (35.59)
Average precipitation days (≥ 1.0 mm)	11.5	9.7	10.4	11.7	10.6	9.4	7.4	8.2	8.8	10.6	11.8	12.0	122.3
Mean monthly sunshine hours	84.8	114.0	167.9	185.1	216.6	243.0	263.9	249.1	203.2	141.4	89.0	78.4	2,036.5
Source: Meteociel

== Administration ==
The most recent mayors of Brive-la-Gaillarde were:

- 1966–1995: Jean Charbonnel
- 1995–2008: Bernard Murat
- 2008–present: Philippe Nauche

== Population ==
Historical population

Year	Pop.	±% p.a.
1793	5,847	—
1800	5,762	−0.21%
1806	7,608	+4.74%
1821	6,801	−0.74%
1831	8,031	+1.68%
1836	8,843	+1.95%
1841	8,350	−1.14%
1846	8,382	+0.08%
1851	8,889	+1.18%
1856	9,384	+1.09%
1861	9,854	+0.98%
1866	10,389	+1.06%
1872	10,765	+0.59%
1876	11,920	+2.58%
1881	14,182	+3.54%
1886	15,707	+2.06%
1891	16,803	+1.36%
1896	18,111	+1.51%
1901	19,496	+1.48%

Year	Pop.	±% p.a.
1906	20,636	+1.14%
1911	21,486	+0.81%
1921	21,711	+0.10%
1926	24,049	+2.07%
1931	26,718	+2.13%
1936	29,074	+1.70%
1946	33,501	+1.43%
1954	36,088	+0.93%
1962	40,175	+1.35%
1968	46,561	+2.49%
1975	51,828	+1.54%
1982	51,511	−0.09%
1990	49,765	−0.43%
1999	49,141	−0.14%
2007	50,231	+0.27%
2012	47,411	−1.15%
2017	46,916	−0.21%
2023	47,095	+0.06%

Source: EHESS and INSEE (1968-2023)

== Transport ==
Brive-la-Gaillarde railway station offers connections to Limoges, Périgueux, Bordeaux, Toulouse, Paris and several regional destinations. The A20 motorway connects Brive with Limoges and Toulouse, the A89 with Bordeaux.

Brive–Souillac Airport lies south of the city. It was opened in 2010 to replace the older Brive-La Roche Airport.

== Sport ==
The city is home to a rugby union team, CA Brive. It also hosted the 2009 Junior World Rowing Championships.

ESA Brive is a French football club founded in 1920.

== Notable people ==
- Guillaume Marie Anne Brune (1763–1815), marshal of France
- Alceste De Ambris (born 15 September 1874 to Licciana Nardi, and died December 9, 1934, in Brive-la-Gaillard), an Italian politician and syndicalist
- Nicolas Ernault des Bruslys, born on 7 August 1757 in Brive-la-Gaillarde and died on 25 September 1809 in Reunion, is a French general of the Revolution and the Empire.
- Guillaume Dubois (1656–1723), cardinal and statesman
- David Feuerwerker (1912–1980) rabbi and professor of French Jewish history (Geneva, 2 October 1912 – Montreal, 20 June 1980).
- Antoinette Feuerwerker (1912–2003) Belgian lawyer and educator, wife of David Feuerwerker; Member of the Combat movement in Limousin alongside Edmond Michelet.
- Cédric Heymans (1978– ), international rugby union player
- Michel Labrousse (1912–1988), scholar of Roman history
- Pierre André Latreille (1762–1833), entomologist
- Robert Margerit (1910–1988), writer.
- Edmond Michelet (1899–1970), politician, leader of the Movement Combat Limousin; arrested by the Gestapo in Brive in February 1943; died in the village of Marcillac, the town of Brive.
- Louis Néel (1904–2000), physicist, Nobel Prize 1970, died in Brive
- Xavier Patier (1958– ), civil servant and writer
- Damian Penaud (1996– ), international rugby union player
- Patrick Sebastien (born 1953), imitator, actor, singer, television host.
- Marine Serre (1991– ), fashion designer
- Jean-Baptiste Treilhard (born 3 January 1742 in Brive-la-Gaillarde – died December 1810 in Paris) was a French jurist and politician at the end of the 18th and the beginning of the 19th century.
- Cédric Villani (1973– ), mathematician; Fields Medalist in 2010
- Dimitri Yachvili (1980– ), international rugby union player

== Twin towns – sister cities ==
Brive-la-Gaillarde is twinned with:

- Guimarães, Portugal
- Joliette, Canada
- Lauf an der Pegnitz, Germany
- Melitopol, Ukraine
- Sikasso, Mali

== See also ==
- Communes of the Corrèze department
