= Canton of Brive-la-Gaillarde-4 =

Coordinates: 45.15°N 1.53°E

The canton of Brive-la-Gaillarde-4 is an administrative division of the Corrèze department, south-central France. It was created at the French canton reorganisation which came into effect in March 2015. Its seat is in Brive-la-Gaillarde.

It consists of the following communes:

1. Brive-la-Gaillarde (partly)
