= Canton of Saint-Pantaléon-de-Larche =

Coordinates: 45.14°N 1.45°E

The canton of Saint-Pantaléon-de-Larche is an administrative division of the Corrèze department, south-central France. It was created at the French canton reorganisation which came into effect in March 2015. Its seat is in Saint-Pantaléon-de-Larche.

It consists of the following communes:

1. Chartrier-Ferrière
2. Chasteaux
3. Cublac
4. Estivals
5. Jugeals-Nazareth
6. Larche
7. Lissac-sur-Couze
8. Mansac
9. Nespouls
10. Noailles
11. Saint-Cernin-de-Larche
12. Saint-Pantaléon-de-Larche
13. Turenne
