= Frédéric Soulier =

French politician (born 1965)

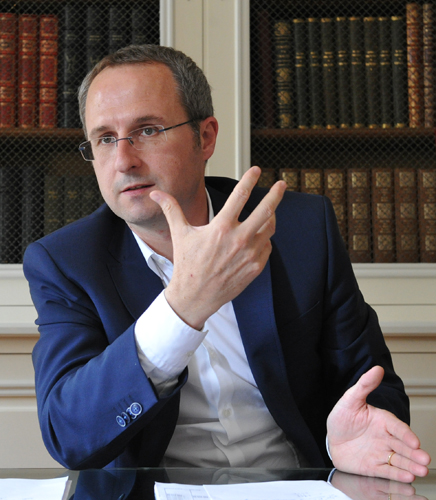
- Soulier in 2014

Member of the French National Assembly for Corrèze's 2nd constituency
- In office 19 June 2002 – 19 June 2007
- Preceded by: Philippe Nauche
- Succeeded by: Philippe Nauche

Personal details
- Born: 8 December 1965 (age 60)
- Party: The Republicans (since 2015)

Frédéric Soulier (born 8 December 1965) is a French politician serving as mayor of Brive-la-Gaillarde since 2014. From 2002 to 2007, he was a member of the National Assembly.
