= Corrèze's 2nd constituency =

Constituency of the National Assembly of France

2nd constituency of the Corrèze
- inline Constituency of the National Assembly of France

- The constituency in Corrèze.

- Corrèze in France
- Deputy: Frédérique Meunier; LR
- Department: Corrèze
- Cantons: (pre-2015) Ayen, Beaulieu-sur-Dordogne, Beynat, Brive-la-Gaillarde Centre, Brive-la-Gaillarde Nord-Est, Brive-la-Gaillarde Nord-Ouest, Brive-la-Gaillarde Sud-Est, Brive-la-Gaillarde Sud-Ouest, Juillac, Larche, Lubersac, Malemortsur-Corrèze, Meyssac, Mercoeur, Saint-Privat

The 2nd constituency of the Corrèze is one of two French legislative constituencies in the Corrèze department (Limousin). There were three constituencies in the department until the 2010 redistricting of French legislative constituencies.

Following that redistricting, it consists of fifteen (pre-2015) cantons :

- Ayen, Beaulieu-sur-Dordogne, Beynat, Brive-la-Gaillarde Centre, Brive-la-Gaillarde Nord-Est, Brive-la-Gaillarde Nord-Ouest, Brive-la-Gaillarde Sud-Est, Brive-la-Gaillarde Sud-Ouest, Juillac, Larche, Lubersac, Malemortsur-Corrèze, Meyssac, Mercoeur and Saint-Privat.

== Historic representation ==
Election	Member	Party
1958	Jean Filliol	UNR
1962	Jean Charbonnel	UNR
1966	Pierre Pouyade	UNR
1967	Roland Dumas	FGDS
1968	Jean Charbonnel	UDR
1972	Charles Ceyrac	UDR
1973	Jean Charbonnel	UDR
1973	Charles Ceyrac	UDR
1978	Jacques Chaminade	PCF
1981	Jean-Claude Cassaing	PS
1986	Proportional representation - no election by constituency	
1988	Jean Charbonnel	DVD
1993	Bernard Murat	RPR
1997	Philippe Nauche	PS
2002	Frédéric Soulier	UMP
2007	Philippe Nauche	PS
2012	Philippe Nauche	PS
2017	Frédérique Meunier	LR
2022	Frédérique Meunier	LR
2024	Frédérique Meunier	LR

== Election results ==
=== 2024 ===
Candidate	Party	Alliance	First round			Second round		
Candidate	Party	Alliance	Votes	%	+/–	Votes	%	+/–
Valéry Elophe	RN		23,250	36.28	+18.73	24,960	40.06	new
Frédérique Meunier	LR	UDC	22,456	35.04	+11.76	37,354	59.94	+1.54
Amandine Dewaele	LÉ	NFP	17,063	26.63	+5.47	withdrew		
Sylvie Sicard	LO		1,309	2.04	+1.15			
Votes			64,078	100.00		62,314	100.00	
Valid votes			64,078	95.97	-0.48	62,314	93.34	+2.01
Blank votes			1,488	2.23	+0.01	2,764	4.14	-1.09
Null votes			1,205	1.80	+0.47	1,685	2.52	-0.92
Turnout			66,771	71.59	+17.74	66,763	71.57	+19.48
Abstentions			26,494	28.41	-17.74	26,516	28.43	-19.48
Registered voters			93,265			93,279		
Result			LR HOLD					

=== 2022 ===
Legislative Election 2022: Corrèze's 2nd constituency
Party	Candidate	Votes	%	±%
LR (UDC)	Frédérique Meunier	11,262	23.28	+1.45
EELV (NUPÉS)	Chloé Herzhaft	10,239	21.16	-7.39
LREM (Ensemble)	Nicolas Brousse	9,947	20.56	−10.07
RN	Valéry Elophe	8,490	17.55	+8.83
FGR	Charles-Henri Le Billan	2,477	5.12	N/A
REC	Camille Dos Santos De Oliveira	1,603	3.31	N/A
DVG	Lise Quillot	1,063	2.20	N/A
Others	N/A	3,299	6.82	
Turnout		48,380	53.85	−0.55
2nd round result
LR (UDC)	Frédérique Meunier	25,881	58.40	+8.37
EELV (NUPÉS)	Chloé Nerzhaft	18,433	41.60	N/A
Turnout		44,314	52.09	+3.61
LR hold				

=== 2017 ===
Candidate	Label	First round		Second round	
Candidate	Label	Votes	%	Votes	%
Patricia Bordas	REM	14,887	30.63	18,849	49.97
Frédérique Meunier	LR	10,611	21.83	18,874	50.03
Philippe Nauche	PS	6,872	14.14		
Selin Ersoy	FI	5,596	11.51		
Jean-Pierre Moret	FN	4,241	8.72		
Jean-Claude Deschamps	DVD	1,467	3.02		
Jean-Marc Comas	DVD	1,457	3.00		
Philippe Tillet	PCF	1,408	2.90		
Jean-Pierre Faurie	DLF	604	1.24		
Daniel Ponthier	EXD	447	0.92		
Bruno Meura	ECO	382	0.79		
Sylvie Sicard	EXG	325	0.67		
Julien Magne	DIV	277	0.57		
Paul de Montbron	DIV	34	0.07		
Votes		48,608	100.00	37,723	100.00
Valid votes		48,608	96.56	37,723	84.10
Blank votes		1,135	2.25	4,337	9.67
Null votes		598	1.19	2,797	6.24
Turnout		50,341	54.40	44,857	48.48
Abstentions		42,191	45.60	47,674	51.52
Registered voters		92,532		92,531	
Source: Ministry of the Interior

=== 2012 ===
2012 legislative election in Correze's 2nd constituency
Candidate	Party	First round		Second round	
Candidate	Party	Votes	%	Votes	%
Philippe Nauche	PS	26,810	46.39%	33,193	58.96%
Pascal Coste	UMP	17,748	30.71%	23,100	41.04%
Alain Balmisse	FN	5,405	9.35%		
Eric Coquerel	FG	4,004	6.93%		
Jean-Claude Deschamps	MoDem	1,268	2.19%		
Daniel Freygefond	EELV	1,191	2.06%		
Claire Roborel De Climens	MPF	430	0.74%		
Jean-Pierre Grau		362	0.63%		
Claude Jarry Des Loges	AEI	300	0.52%		
Bruno Ratié	LO	274	0.47%		
Valid votes		57,792	97.83%	56,293	96.13%
Spoilt and null votes		1,284	2.17%	2,266	3.87%
Votes cast / turnout		59,076	64.26%	58,559	63.70%
Abstentions		32,861	35.74%	33,364	36.30%
Registered voters		91,937	100.00%	91,923	100.00%

Source: Ministry of the Interior

=== 2007 ===
Legislative Election 2007: Corrèze's 2nd constituency
Party	Candidate	Votes	%	±%
UMP	Frédéric Soulier	19,268	42.83	
PS	Philippe Nauche	15,725	34.95	
MoDem	Jean-Claude Deschamps	3,177	7.06	
PCF	Jean Prat	2,128	4.73	
FN	Françoise Moreau	1,333	2.96	
LV	Evelyne Simon	909	2.02	
Others	N/A	2,451		
Turnout		46,020	66.04	
2nd round result
PS	Philippe Nauche	23,106	50.94	
UMP	Frédéric Soulier	22,251	49.06	
Turnout		46,795	67.17	
PS gain from UMP				

=== 2002 ===
Legislative Election 2002: Corrèze's 2nd constituency
Party	Candidate	Votes	%	±%
UMP	Frédéric Soulier	18,185	39.61	
PS	Philippe Nauche	15,076	32.84	
FN	Raymond Feral	3,050	6.64	
DVD	Jean-Claude Deschamps	2,705	5.89	
PCF	André Pamboutzoglou	2,622	5.71	
CPNT	Louis Hironde	1,174	2.56	
LV	Marie-Nicole Boisseau	1,038	2.26	
Others	N/A	2,058		
Turnout		47,207	71.17	
2nd round result
UMP	Frédéric Soulier	24,047	53.68	
PS	Philippe Nauche	20,748	46.32	
Turnout		46,540	70.17	
UMP gain from PS				

=== 1997 ===
Legislative Election 1997: Corrèze's 2nd constituency
Party	Candidate	Votes	%	±%
RPR	Bernard Murat	14,384	32.33	
PS	Philippe Nauche	12,934	29.07	
DVD	Jean Charbonnel	5,170	11.62	
PCF	André Pamboutzoglou	5,114	11.49	
FN	Francis Ducreu	3,895	8.75	
LV	Philippe Bernis	1,969	4.43	
MPF	Aznar Chantal	1,024	2.30	
Turnout		47,226	74.52	
2nd round result
PS	Philippe Nauche	24,220	51.92	
RPR	Bernard Murat	22,431	48.08	
Turnout		49,728	78.51	
PS gain from RPR				

== Sources ==
- Notes and portraits of the French MPs under the Fifth Republic, French National Assembly
- 2012 results in the Corrèze's 2nd constituency, Minister of the Interior
- Constituencies of the Corrèze, Atlaspol website
