= Frédérique Meunier =

French politician

Member of the National Assembly for Corrèze's 2nd constituency
- Incumbent
- Assumed office 21 June 2017
- Preceded by: Philippe Nauche

Personal details
- Born: 8 December 1960 (age 65) Paris, France
- Party: Soyons libres
- Other political affiliations: The Republicans

Frédérique Meunier (born 8 December 1960) is a French lawyer and politician of the Republicans (LR) who has been serving as a member of the French National Assembly since 18 June 2017, representing the department of Corrèze.

== Political career ==
In parliament, Meunier has been serving on the Committee on Cultural Affairs and Media.

Frédérique Meunier is a candidate in the canton of Malemort-sur-Corrèze in the 2011 cantonal elections. She was defeated in the second round by incumbent PS general councillor Robert Penalva.

Ahead of the Republicans’ 2021 primaries, Meunier endorsed Valérie Pécresse as the party's candidate for 2022 presidential elections. In the run-up to the Republicans' 2022 convention, he endorsed Bruno Retailleau as the party's chairman;

== See also ==
- 2017 French legislative election
