= Lissac-sur-Couze =

- Commune
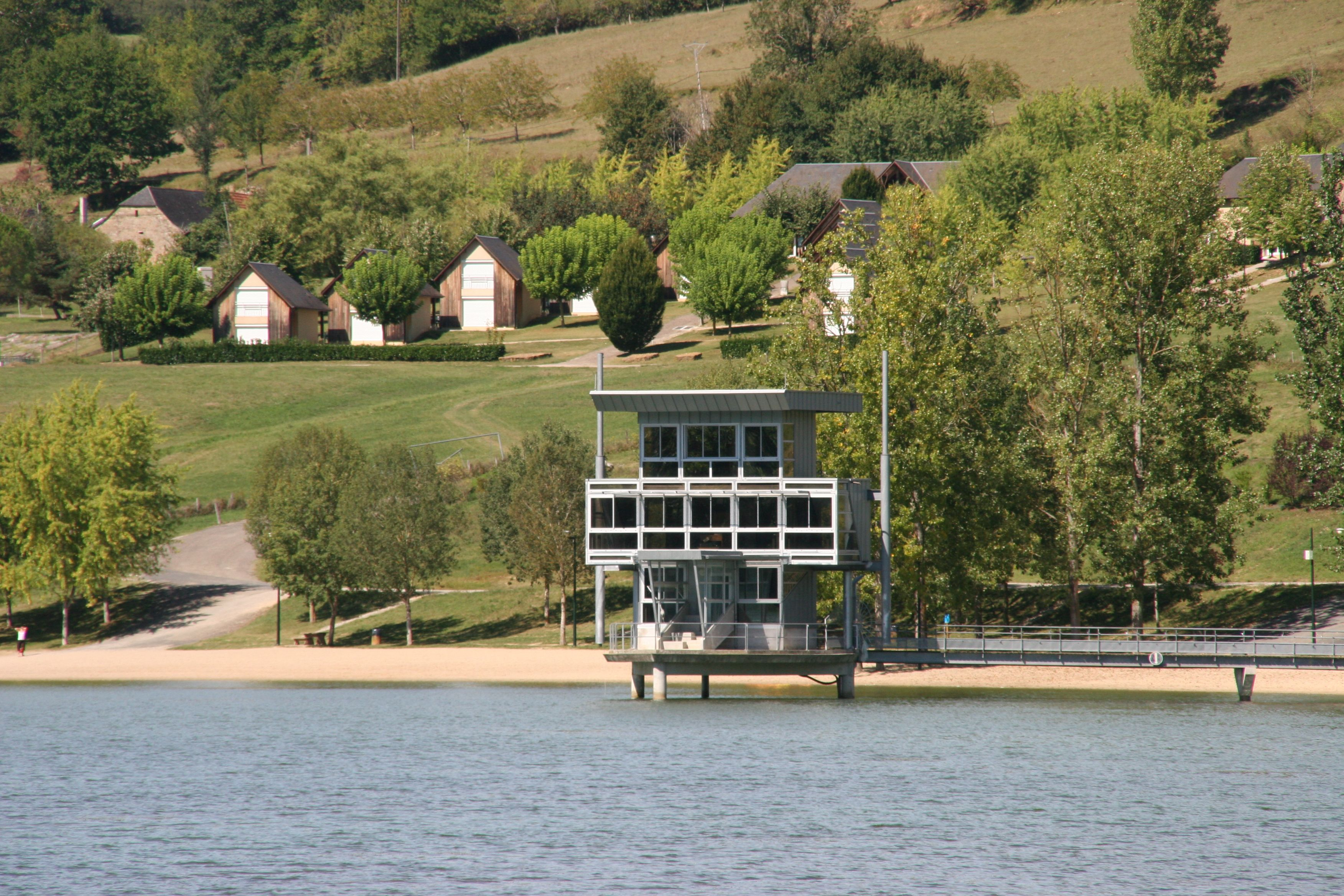
- Lac du Causse

- Coat of arms
- Location of Lissac-sur-Couze
- Location within France Location within Nouvelle-Aquitaine
- Coordinates: 45°06′17″N 1°27′43″E
- Country: France
- Region: Nouvelle-Aquitaine
- Department: Corrèze
- Arrondissement: Brive-la-Gaillarde
- Canton: Saint-Pantaléon-de-Larche
- Intercommunality: CA Bassin de Brive

Government
  - Mayor (2020–2026): Noël Crouzel
- Area^{1}: 12.62 km^{2} (4.87 sq mi)
- Elevation: 170 m (560 ft)
- Highest elevation: 353 m (1,158 ft)
- Lowest elevation: 110 m (360 ft)
- Population (2023): 705
  - Density: 55.9/km^{2} (145/sq mi)
- Time zone: UTC+01:00 (CET)
  - Summer (DST): UTC+02:00 (CEST)
- INSEE/Postal code: 19117 /19600
- ^{1} French Land Register data, which excludes lakes, ponds, glaciers > 1 km^{2} (0.386 sq mi or 247 acres) and river estuaries.

Lissac-sur-Couze (French pronunciation: [lisak syʁ kuz]; Occitan: Lissac) is a commune in the Corrèze department in central France.

== Population ==
Historical population
| Year | Pop. | ±% p.a. |
|---|---|---|
| 1968 | 439 | — |
| 1975 | 401 | −1.29% |
| 1982 | 402 | +0.04% |
| 1990 | 475 | +2.11% |
| 1999 | 527 | +1.16% |
| 2007 | 683 | +3.29% |
| 2012 | 744 | +1.73% |
| 2017 | 730 | −0.38% |
| 2023 | 705 | −0.58% |
Source: INSEE

== See also ==
- Communes of the Corrèze department
