= Ussac =

- Commune
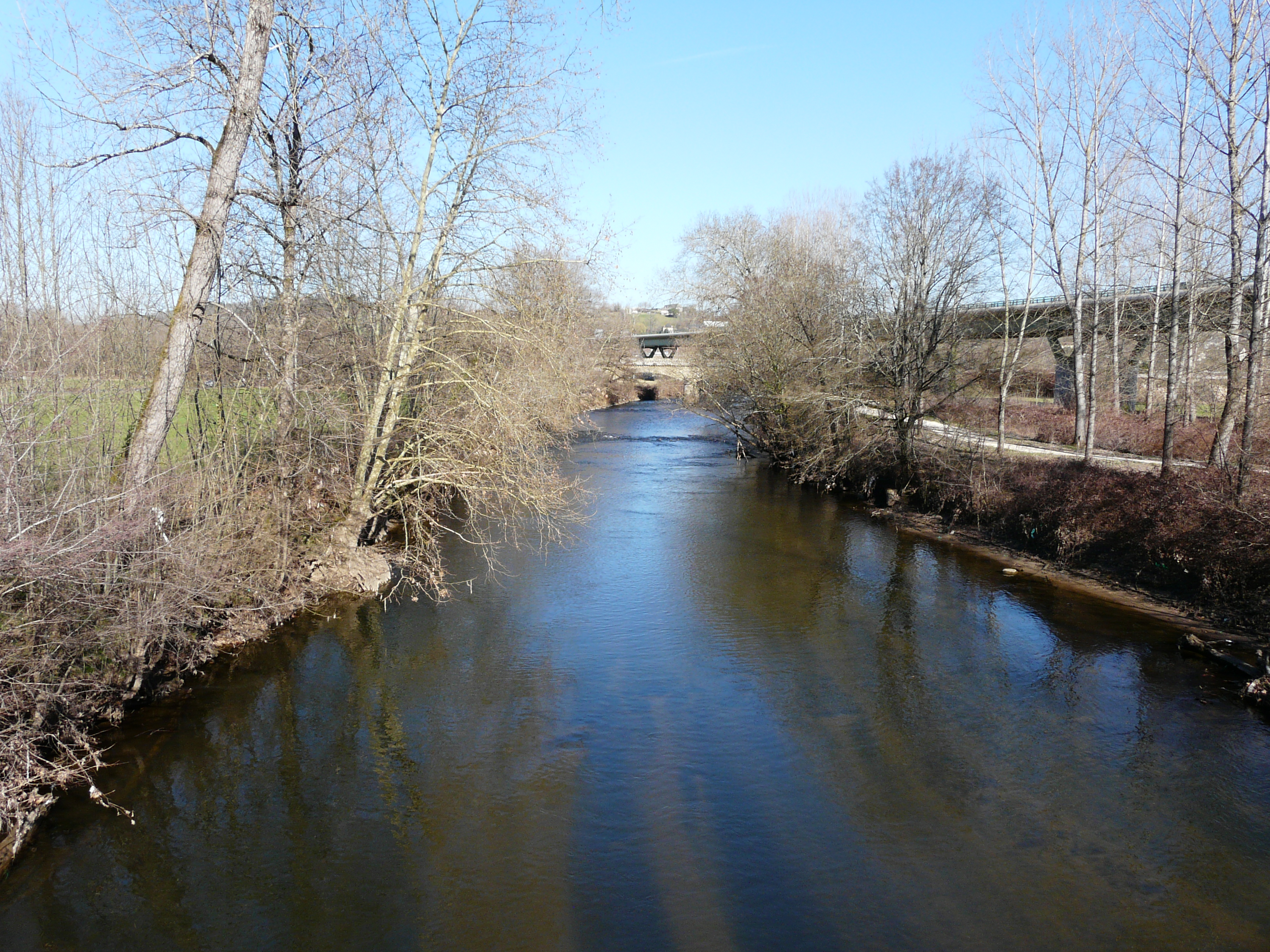
- The Corrèze river with the edge of Ussac to the left, and Saint-Pantaléon-de-Larche

- Coat of arms
- Location of Ussac
- Location within France Location within Nouvelle-Aquitaine
- Coordinates: 45°11′36″N 1°30′36″E
- Country: France
- Region: Nouvelle-Aquitaine
- Department: Corrèze
- Arrondissement: Brive-la-Gaillarde
- Canton: Malemort
- Intercommunality: CA Bassin de Brive

Government
  - Mayor (2020–2026): Jean-Philippe Bosselut
- Area^{1}: 24.63 km^{2} (9.51 sq mi)
- Elevation: 150 m (490 ft)
- Highest elevation: 304 m (997 ft)
- Lowest elevation: 92 m (302 ft)
- Population (2023): 4,322
  - Density: 175.5/km^{2} (454.5/sq mi)
- Time zone: UTC+01:00 (CET)
  - Summer (DST): UTC+02:00 (CEST)
- INSEE/Postal code: 19274 /19270
- ^{1} French Land Register data, which excludes lakes, ponds, glaciers > 1 km^{2} (0.386 sq mi or 247 acres) and river estuaries.

Ussac (French pronunciation: [ysak]) is a commune in the Corrèze department in central France.

== Population ==
Historical population
Year	Pop.	±% p.a.
1968	1,418	—
1975	1,655	+2.23%
1982	2,077	+3.30%
1990	2,762	+3.63%
1999	3,260	+1.86%
2007	3,566	+1.13%
2012	3,994	+2.29%
2017	4,178	+0.90%
2023	4,322	+0.57%
Source: INSEE

== See also ==
- Communes of the Corrèze department
