= Larche, Corrèze =

Larche
- Commune
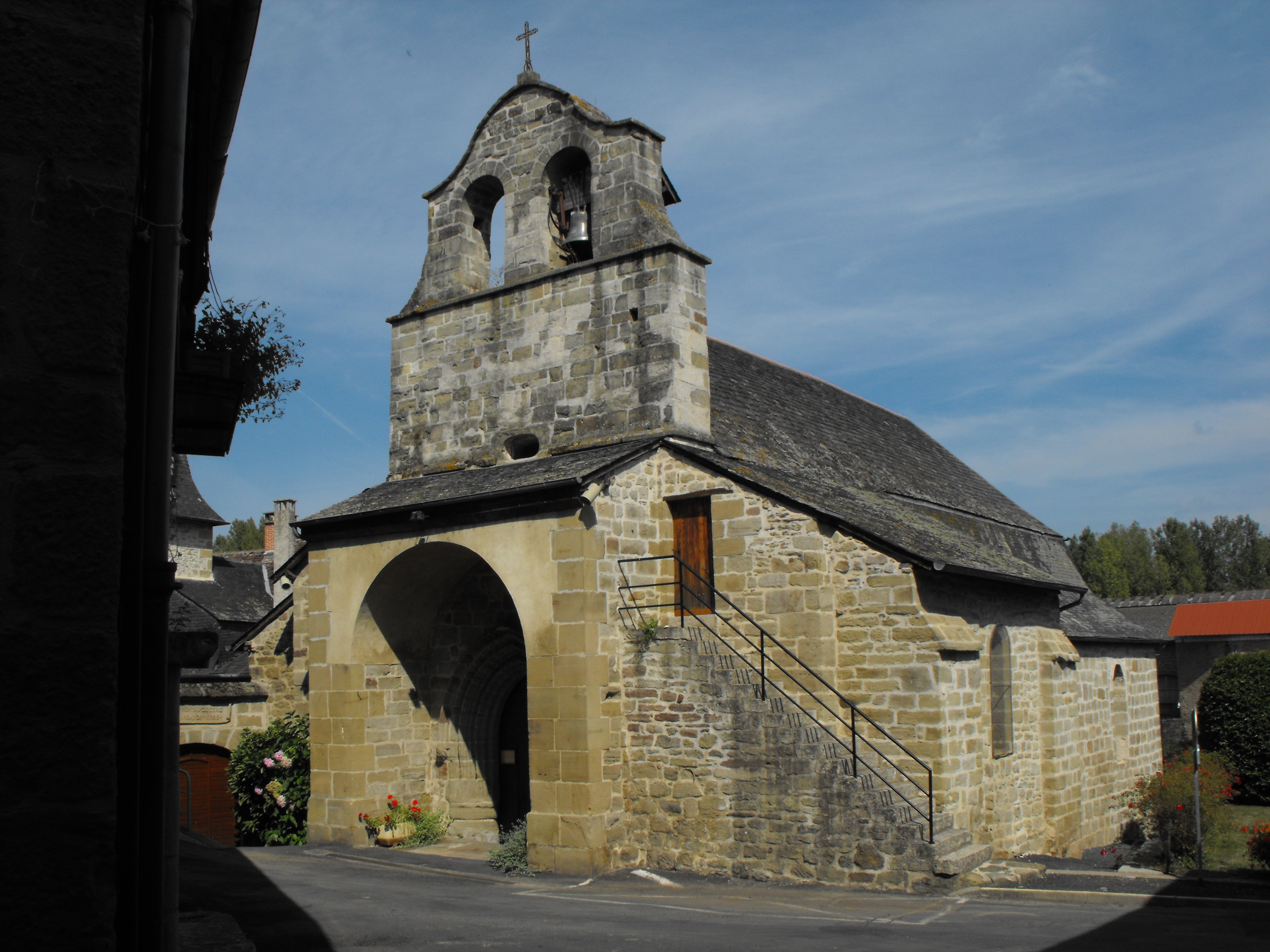
- The church in Larche

- Coat of arms
- Location of Larche
- Location within France Location within Nouvelle-Aquitaine
- Coordinates: 45°07′17″N 1°24′59″E
- Country: France
- Region: Nouvelle-Aquitaine
- Department: Corrèze
- Arrondissement: Brive-la-Gaillarde
- Canton: Saint-Pantaléon-de-Larche
- Intercommunality: CA Bassin de Brive

Government
  - Mayor (2020–2026): Bernard Laroche
- Area^{1}: 5.74 km^{2} (2.22 sq mi)
- Elevation: 90 m (300 ft)
- Highest elevation: 340 m (1,120 ft)
- Lowest elevation: 83 m (272 ft)
- Population (2023): 1,645
  - Density: 287/km^{2} (742/sq mi)
- Time zone: UTC+01:00 (CET)
  - Summer (DST): UTC+02:00 (CEST)
- INSEE/Postal code: 19107 /19600
- ^{1} French Land Register data, which excludes lakes, ponds, glaciers > 1 km^{2} (0.386 sq mi or 247 acres) and river estuaries.

Larche (French pronunciation: [laʁʃ]; Occitan: L'Archa) is a commune in the Corrèze department in central France.

== Population ==
Historical population
Year	Pop.	±% p.a.
1968	812	—
1975	918	+1.77%
1982	1,155	+3.34%
1990	1,322	+1.70%
1999	1,418	+0.78%
2007	1,643	+1.86%
2012	1,583	−0.74%
2017	1,583	+0.00%
2023	1,645	+0.64%
Source: INSEE

The inhabitants of Larche are called Larchois and Larchoises in French.

== See also ==
- Communes of the Corrèze department
