= Noailles =

Noailles may refer to:

== Places in France ==
- Noailles, Corrèze, in the Corrèze department
- Noailles, Oise, in the Oise department
- Noailles, Tarn, in the Tarn department
- Noailles, Marseille, a neighborhood and metro station of the 1st arrondissement of Marseille
- Noailles, Vendée, a hamlet in the Vendée department

== People ==
- Three 16th-century French diplomatic brothers:
  - Antoine de Noailles (1504–1562), French diplomat
  - François de Noailles (1519–1585), Papal Prothonotary, Bishop and French ambassador
  - Gilles de Noailles (1524–1600), French Ambassador to the Ottoman Empire
- Duke of Noailles, a French peerage created in 1663 including a long list of members of the Noailles family
- Anna de Noailles (1876-1933), Romanian-French poet and writer
