= Opération Pièces jaunes =

French fundraising initiative

- Founded: 1989; 37 years ago
- Founders: Fondation des Hôpitaux
- Origins: France
- Website: www.fondationhopitaux.fr/pieces-jaunes/ don.fondationhopitaux.fr/piecesjaunes-spot

Operation Yellow Coins (French: Opération Pièces jaunes) is a French foundation with the goal of improving the conditions of hospitalized children and adolescents. It was created in 1989 by professor Claude Griscelli and backed by the Fondation des Hôpitaux. One of the foundation's main supporters was the former first lady of France, Bernadette Chirac, who oversaw its fundraising national campaigns from 1994 to 2019. In Operation Yellow Coins' first 30 years, it raised 96 million euros from numerous public and private entities and institutions.

== See also ==
- Child life specialist
- List of children's hospitals
- Pediatrics
