= Noailles, Corrèze =

Noailles
- Commune
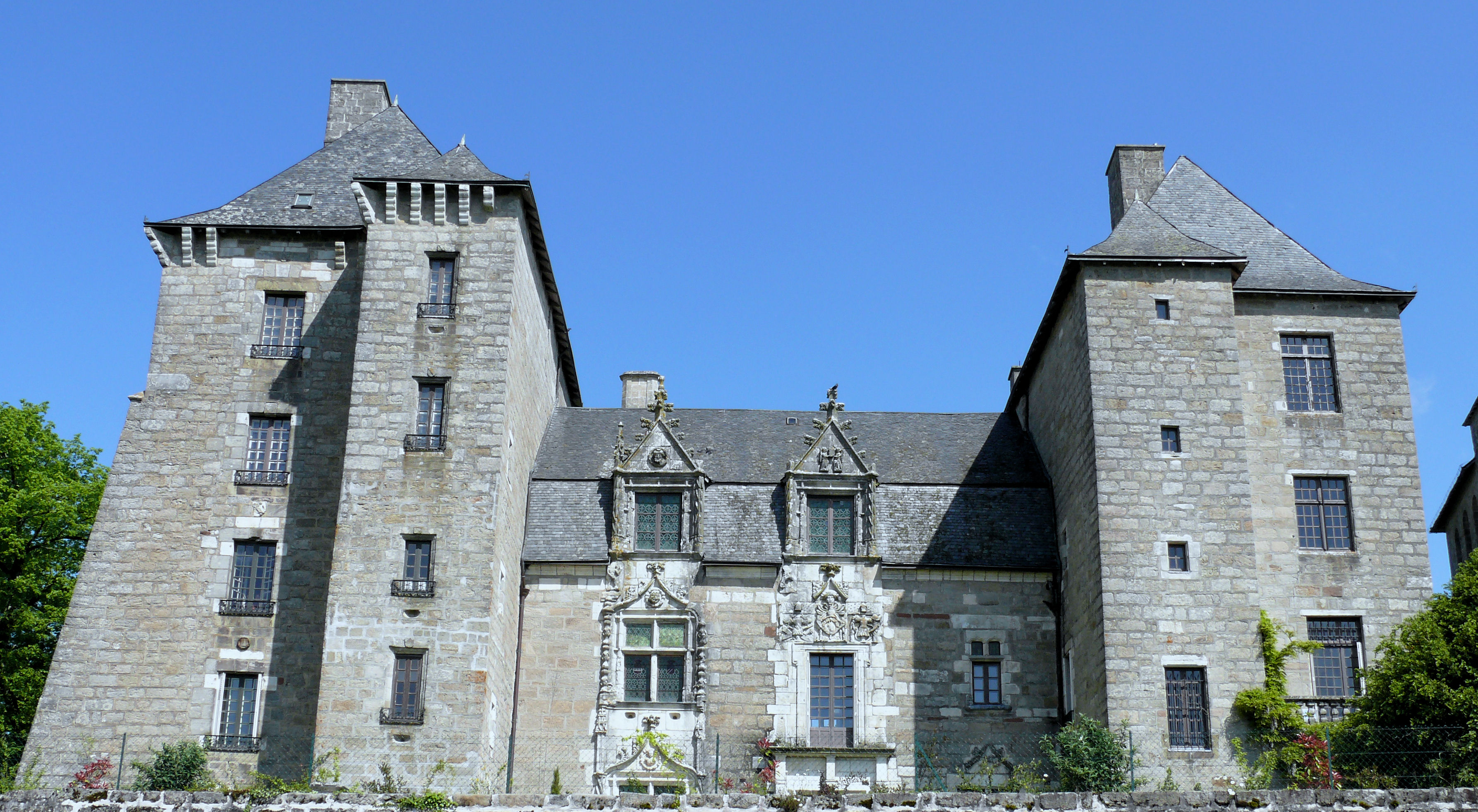
- Chateau

- Coat of arms
- Location of Noailles
- Location within France Location within Nouvelle-Aquitaine
- Coordinates: 45°06′14″N 1°31′25″E
- Country: France
- Region: Nouvelle-Aquitaine
- Department: Corrèze
- Arrondissement: Brive-la-Gaillarde
- Canton: Saint-Pantaléon-de-Larche
- Intercommunality: CA Bassin de Brive

Government
  - Mayor (2020–2026): Hervé Brucy
- Area^{1}: 12.57 km^{2} (4.85 sq mi)
- Elevation: 300 m (980 ft)
- Highest elevation: 315 m (1,033 ft)
- Lowest elevation: 151 m (495 ft)
- Population (2023): 945
  - Density: 75.2/km^{2} (195/sq mi)
- Time zone: UTC+01:00 (CET)
  - Summer (DST): UTC+02:00 (CEST)
- INSEE/Postal code: 19151 /19600
- ^{1} French Land Register data, which excludes lakes, ponds, glaciers > 1 km^{2} (0.386 sq mi or 247 acres) and river estuaries.

Noailles (French pronunciation: [nɔaj]; Occitan: Noalhas) is a commune in the Corrèze department in central France.

== Geography ==
=== Location ===
The commune, part of the urban area of Brive-la-Gaillarde, is located in the lower south of the Correze department, south of the Brive Basin, north of Causse de Martel. The location of the A20 autoroute nearby gives direct access to Brive 8 km away, via the Exit 52 interchange.

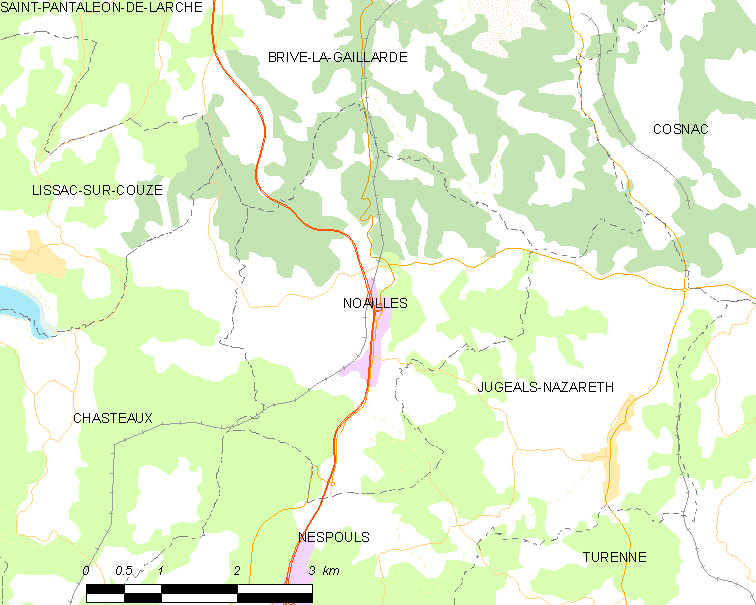
Map of the commune.

=== Population ===
Historical population
Year	Pop.	±% p.a.
1968	360	—
1975	383	+0.89%
1982	515	+4.32%
1990	648	+2.91%
1999	756	+1.73%
2007	780	+0.39%
2012	885	+2.56%
2017	910	+0.56%
2023	945	+0.63%
Source: INSEE

== Local culture and heritage ==
=== Places and monuments ===
==== Château ====
The current château sits in a park behind a stone wall. Its dates back to the 14th century and was the home of the Dukes of Noailles. It has a main building with two towers with machicolations attached to it. It was burnt down in 1789 and rebuilt in the 1800s by Alexis de Noailles. The main buildings windows are decorated with pediments and pinnacles with medallions and angels. The dormer windows are from other châteaux, Jugeals and La Fage, and date from 16th century.

==== Église de l'Assomption-de-Notre-Dame de Noailles ====
Its former name was the Collégiale Sainte-Catherine. The original church building originated in 12th and 13th centuries and then restored again during 15th and 16th centuries. It has a tall Limousin-style bell tower and a five-sided Romanesque apse. The capitals on the small columns in the choir have been carved in scriptural scenes. The tabernacle contains Limousin enamels and the church has two enamelled reliquaries containing relics from Saints Eutrope and Eustelle all from the 13th century. It also has a painting by Claude Gillot called Les Apprêts de la crucifixion (Instruments of the Crucifixion).

== Nearby ==
=== Abîme de la Fage ===
The cave system is part of the Corrézien Causses, a limestone plateau. It was discovered in 1961. The cave galleries are divided into two sections and are visited one after another. These caves are accessed via staircase inside a large sinkhole created after the collapse of the vault. The caves contain columns, stalactites, stalagmites', pools and an organ room. Prehistoric bones from the ice age have been excavated from the cave in the past.

== See also ==
- Communes of the Corrèze department
