= Saint-Pantaléon-de-Larche =

- Commune
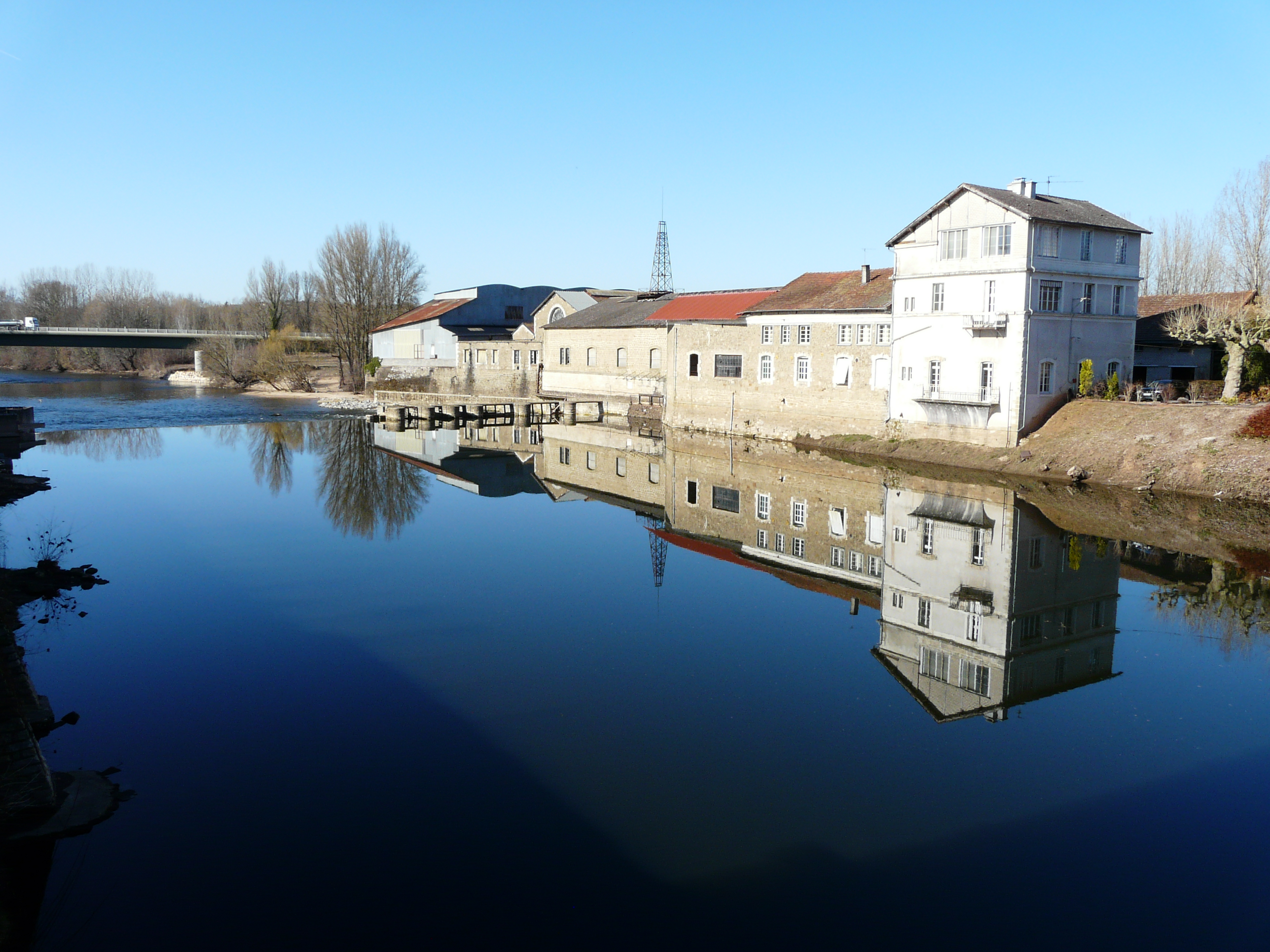
- Bridge over the Vézère

- Coat of arms
- Location of Saint-Pantaléon-de-Larche
- Location within France Location within Nouvelle-Aquitaine
- Coordinates: 45°08′32″N 1°26′49″E
- Country: France
- Region: Nouvelle-Aquitaine
- Department: Corrèze
- Arrondissement: Brive-la-Gaillarde
- Canton: Saint-Pantaléon-de-Larche
- Intercommunality: CA Bassin de Brive

Government
  - Mayor (2020–2026): Alain Lapacherie
- Area^{1}: 23.47 km^{2} (9.06 sq mi)
- Elevation: 103 m (338 ft)
- Highest elevation: 228 m (748 ft)
- Lowest elevation: 82 m (269 ft)
- Population (2023): 5,091
  - Density: 216.9/km^{2} (561.8/sq mi)
- Time zone: UTC+01:00 (CET)
  - Summer (DST): UTC+02:00 (CEST)
- INSEE/Postal code: 19229 /19600
- ^{1} French Land Register data, which excludes lakes, ponds, glaciers > 1 km^{2} (0.386 sq mi or 247 acres) and river estuaries.

Saint-Pantaléon-de-Larche (French pronunciation: [sɛ̃ pɑ̃taleɔ̃ də laʁʃ], literally Saint-Pantaléon of Larche; Occitan: Sent Pantaleon de L'Archa) is a commune in the Corrèze department in central France.

== Population ==
Historical population
Year	Pop.	±% p.a.
1968	1,729	—
1975	2,406	+4.83%
1982	3,019	+3.30%
1990	3,478	+1.78%
1999	3,773	+0.91%
2007	4,507	+2.25%
2012	4,722	+0.94%
2017	4,777	+0.23%
2023	5,091	+1.07%
Source: INSEE

== See also ==
- Communes of the Corrèze department
