= Anh Dao Traxel =

Vietnamese writer (born 1957)

Anh Dao Traxel (Vietnamese spelling: Anh Đào Traxel; born Dương Anh Đào; born 22 August 1957) is the foster daughter of the late French president Jacques Chirac (1932–2019) and his wife Bernadette (1933–2026). She was a boat-person refugee, and met Jacques Chirac, then the Mayor of Paris, at Roissy Airport in 1979. He told her "Don't cry, ma chérie. You are coming home with us" and took her home. She was then 21 and her adoptive father was 47.

She spent two years in the home of the Chiracs. Traxel was married twice. Her second husband, Emmanuel Traxel, is a police lieutenant. She has four children, Bernard-Jacques, Laurence-Claude, Jacques and Cassandre. The children called Jacques Chirac Grandpa. She is now the president of a European association of assistance to the families of civil servants who died during their service (Étoile européenne du dévouement civil et militaire).

== Awards and honours ==
=== French honours ===
- Légion d'honneur, Chevalier (Knight) — since 2009.

=== Foreign honours ===
- Commandeur de l'Étoile de Mohéli (Comoros)
- Chevalier de l'Étoile de la Grande Comore (known as Saïd Ali).
