= Corrèze =

Department of France in Nouvelle-Aquitaine

Corrèze Corresa (Occitan)
- Department of France
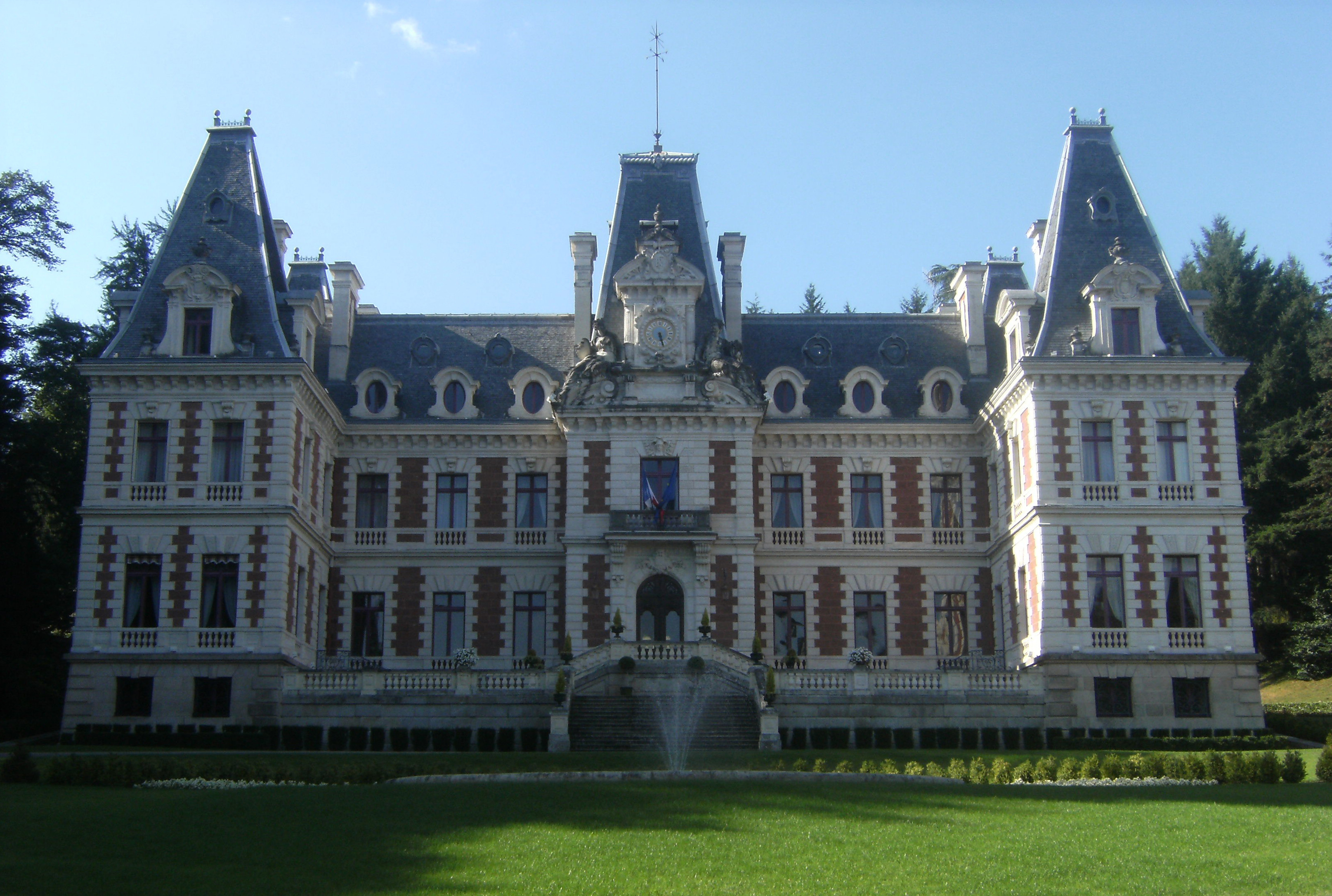
- Prefecture building in Tulle

- Flag Coat of arms

- Location of Corrèze in France
- Coordinates: 45°20′N 1°50′E
- Country: France
- Region: Nouvelle-Aquitaine
- Prefecture: Tulle
- Subprefectures: Brive-la-Gaillarde; Ussel

Government
  - President of the Departmental Council: Pascal Coste (LR)

Area^{1}
  - Total: 5,857 km^{2} (2,261 sq mi)

Population (2023)
  - Total: 240,826
  - Rank: 84th
  - Density: 41.12/km^{2} (106.5/sq mi)
- Time zone: UTC+1 (CET)
  - Summer (DST): UTC+2 (CEST)
- ISO 3166 code: FR-19
- Department number: 19
- Largest city: Brive-la-Gaillarde
- Arrondissements: 3
- Cantons: 19
- Communes: 277
- ^1 French Land Register data, which exclude estuaries and lakes, ponds and glaciers larger than 1 km^{2}

Corrèze (French pronunciation: [kɔʁɛz]; Occitan: Corresa) is a department in France, named after the river Corrèze which runs through it. Although its prefecture is Tulle, its most populated city is Brive-la-Gaillarde. Corrèze is located in the Nouvelle-Aquitaine region, on the border with Occitania and Auvergne-Rhône-Alpes.

In 2023, Corrèze had a population of 240,826, divided among 277 communes. Its inhabitants are called Corréziens (masculine) and Corréziennes (feminine). Its INSEE and postal code is 19.

== Geography ==
The department makes up of most of Lower Limousin and owes its name to the Corrèze river whose entire course flows through the centre, and passes through the two main cities, Tulle and Brive-la-Gaillarde. Tulle is the prefecture of Corrèze, and Brive-la-Gaillarde the largest city.

=== Location ===
Since 2015, the department is administered by the Nouvelle-Aquitaine region. To the north, it borders the departments of Haute-Vienne and Creuse, to the east, the departments of Puy-de-Dôme and Cantal, to the south of that of the Lot and, finally, to the west of that of the Dordogne.

=== Geology and relief ===
Located west of the Massif Central, it consists of three zones: the Mountains (Montagne), the plateaux and the Brive Basin.

The mountains peak at 977 m at Mont Bessou. Its Rhenohercynian Zone formation is quite eroded.

The plateaux have deep valleys that head towards the Dordogne river, such as at the Gimel waterfalls.

Southwest of Corrèze, the Brive sedimentary basin enjoys a more favourable climate. There are sandstone hills like at Collonges-la-Rouge.

=== Hydrography ===
The department is crossed by several rivers, such as Vézère, Corrèze and the Dordogne.

=== Climate ===
The department transitions between the Aquitaine and the Massif Central, the Corrèze department sees its elevation gradually rise from the basin of Brive to the Plateau de Millevaches, watershed of the Atlantic facade. This relief explains the wide variety of climates of Corrèze.

=== Principal towns ===
The most populous commune is Brive-la-Gaillarde; the prefecture Tulle is the second-most populous. As of 2023, there are 8 communes with more than 4,000 inhabitants:

| Commune | Population (2023) |
|---|---|
| Brive-la-Gaillarde | 47,095 |
| Tulle | 13,401 |
| Ussel | 9,187 |
| Malemort | 8,239 |
| Saint-Pantaléon-de-Larche | 5,091 |
| Égletons | 4,341 |
| Ussac | 4,322 |
| Allassac | 4,081 |

== History ==
Corrèze is one of the original 83 departments created during the French Revolution on 4 March 1790. It includes part of the former province of Limousin (the Bas-Limousin).

Within Corrèze the nineteenth-century railway planners, influenced in part by the department's topography, endowed Brive-la-Gaillarde with good connections and a major junction from which railway lines fanned out in six different directions. The railways arrived in 1860, at an opportune moment, directly after phylloxera had destroyed the local wine industry. The new railways enabled the farms in the area surrounding Brive to specialise in fruits and vegetables which they could now transport rapidly to the larger population centres of central and southern France. Locally, the new agriculture triggered the development, in the Brive basin, of related businesses and industries such as the manufacture of jams and liquors, as well as timber/paper-based packaging businesses.

== Demographics ==
The 1851 census recorded a population of 320,866: this remained relatively constant for the rest of the nineteenth century. During the first half of the twentieth century, however, Corrèze shared the experience of many of the country's rural departments as the population fell steadily, and has hovered around 240,000 since 1954.

Historical population

| Year | Pop. | ±% p.a. |
|---|---|---|
| 1791 | 269,767 | — |
| 1801 | 243,654 | −1.01% |
| 1806 | 254,233 | +0.85% |
| 1821 | 273,418 | +0.49% |
| 1831 | 294,834 | +0.76% |
| 1841 | 306,480 | +0.39% |
| 1851 | 320,864 | +0.46% |
| 1861 | 310,118 | −0.34% |
| 1872 | 302,746 | −0.22% |
| 1881 | 317,066 | +0.51% |
| 1891 | 328,151 | +0.34% |
| 1901 | 318,422 | −0.30% |
| 1911 | 309,673 | −0.28% |
| 1921 | 273,808 | −1.22% |

| Year | Pop. | ±% p.a. |
|---|---|---|
| 1931 | 264,129 | −0.36% |
| 1936 | 262,743 | −0.11% |
| 1946 | 254,574 | −0.32% |
| 1954 | 242,798 | −0.59% |
| 1962 | 237,926 | −0.25% |
| 1968 | 237,858 | −0.00% |
| 1975 | 240,363 | +0.15% |
| 1982 | 241,448 | +0.06% |
| 1990 | 237,908 | −0.18% |
| 1999 | 232,576 | −0.25% |
| 2007 | 242,038 | +0.50% |
| 2012 | 241,247 | −0.07% |
| 2017 | 241,464 | +0.02% |
| 2023 | 240,826 | −0.04% |

== Politics ==
The President of the General Council was François Hollande of the Socialist Party until 2012 when he was elected President of the Republic. Jacques Chirac also served as a Deputy of the National Assembly from here for many years.

| Party | | seats |
|---|---|---|
| | Union for a Popular Movement | 18 |
| • | Socialist Party | 16 |
| • | French Communist Party | 2 |
| • | Miscellaneous Left | 1 |

=== Current National Assembly Representatives ===
| Constituency | Member | Party |
|---|---|---|
| Corrèze's 1st constituency | François Hollande | Socialist Party |
| Corrèze's 2nd constituency | Frédérique Meunier | The Republicans |

== Tourism ==
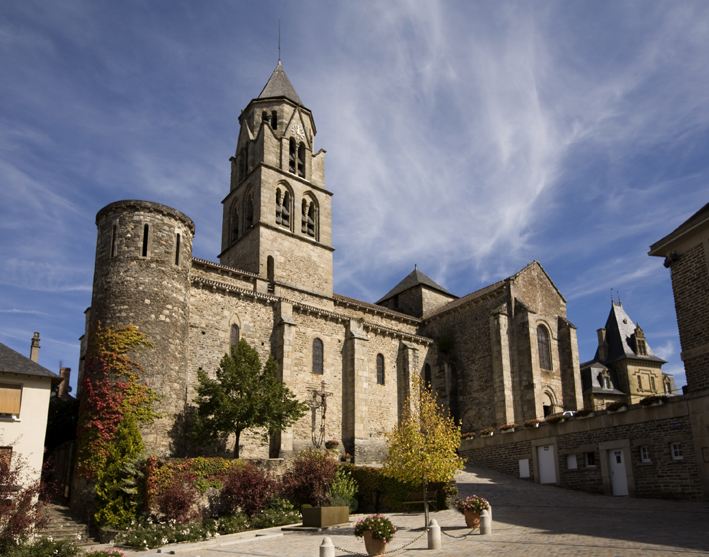
Uzerche

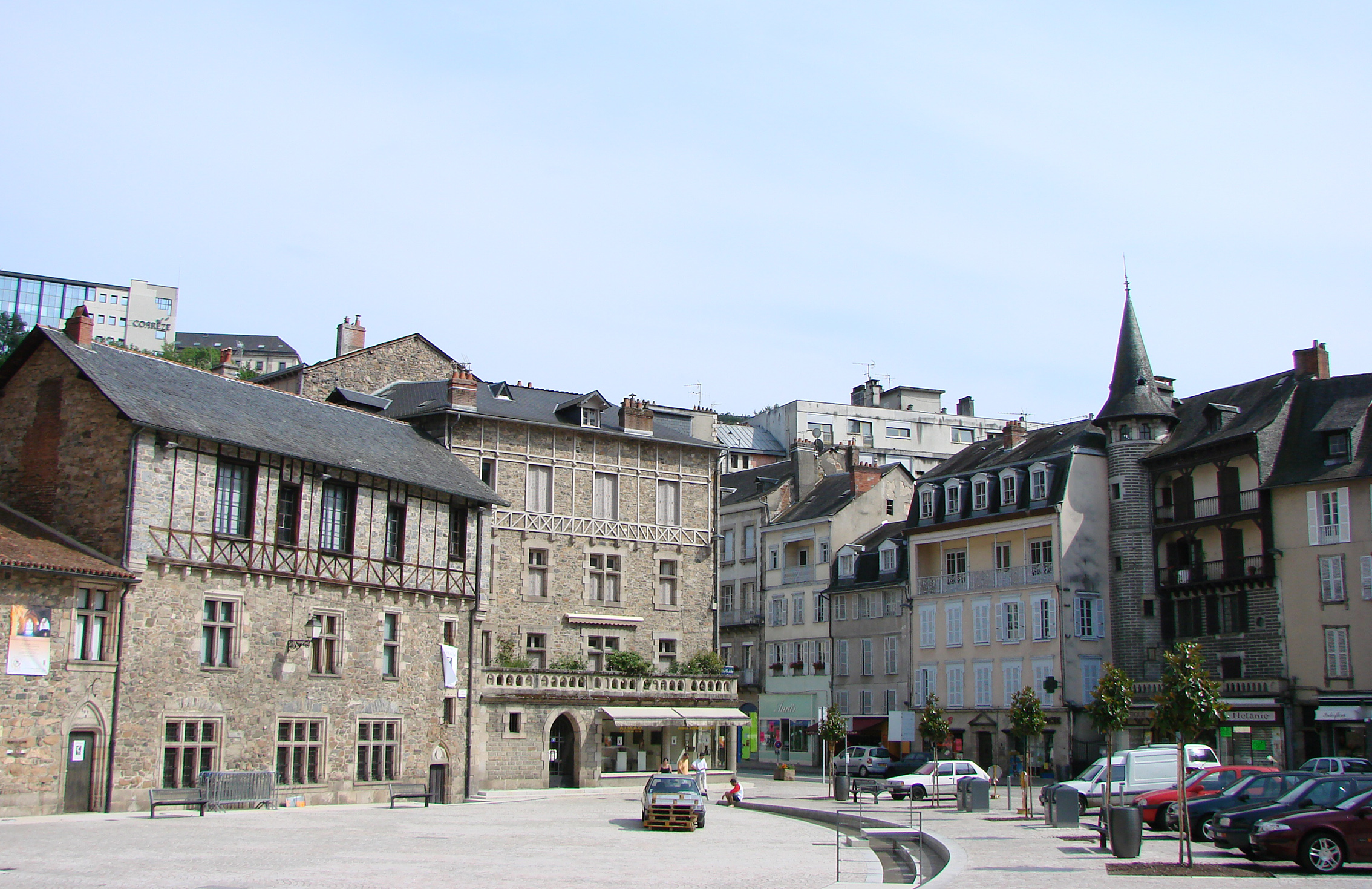
Tulle

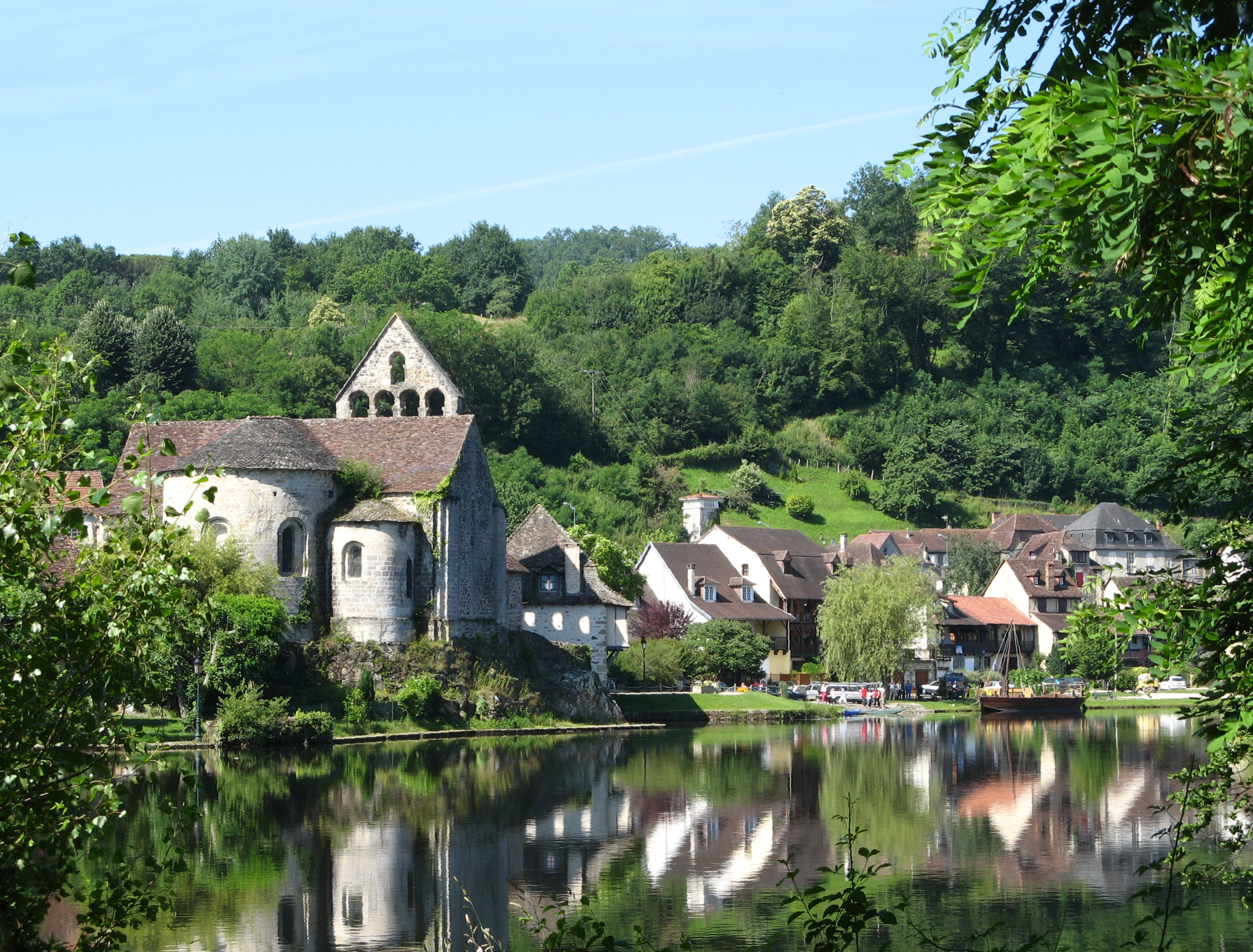
Beaulieu-sur-Dordogne

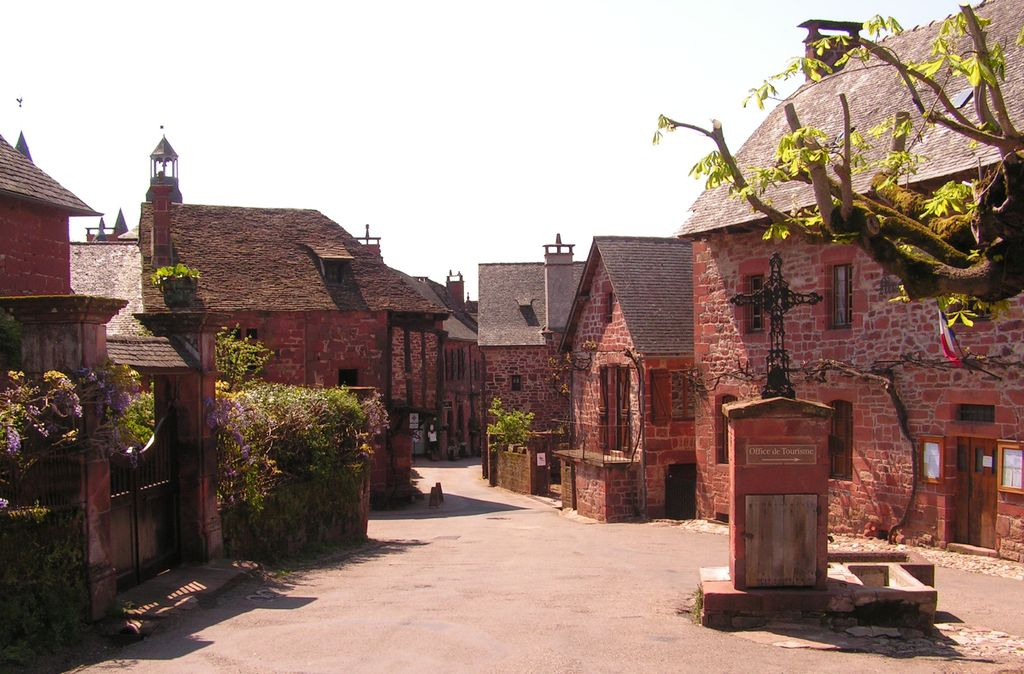
Collonges-la-Rouge

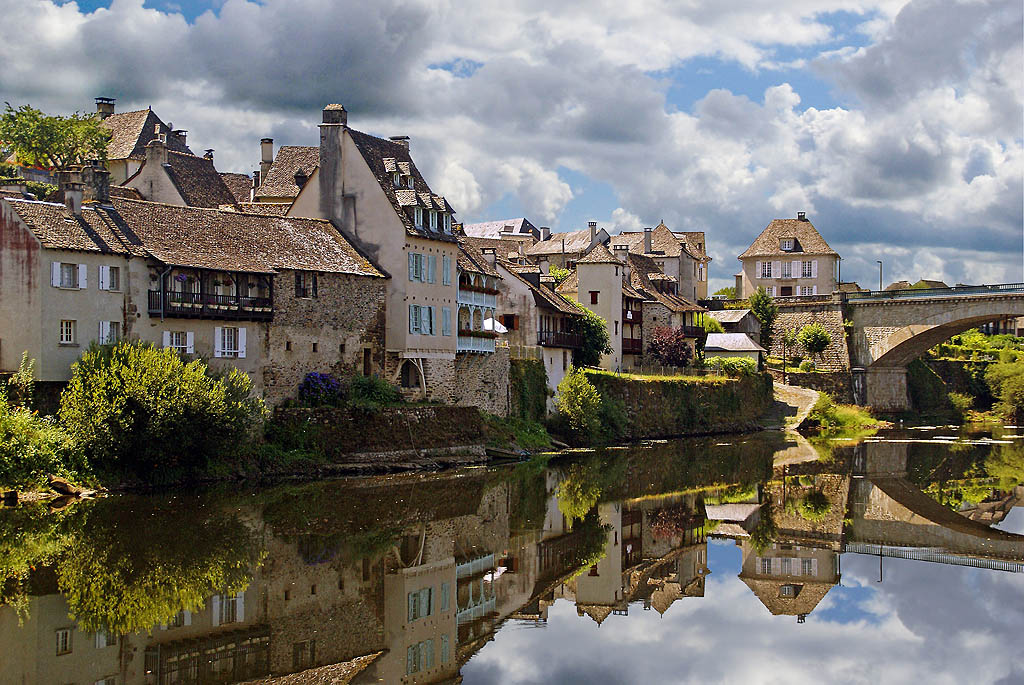
Argentat

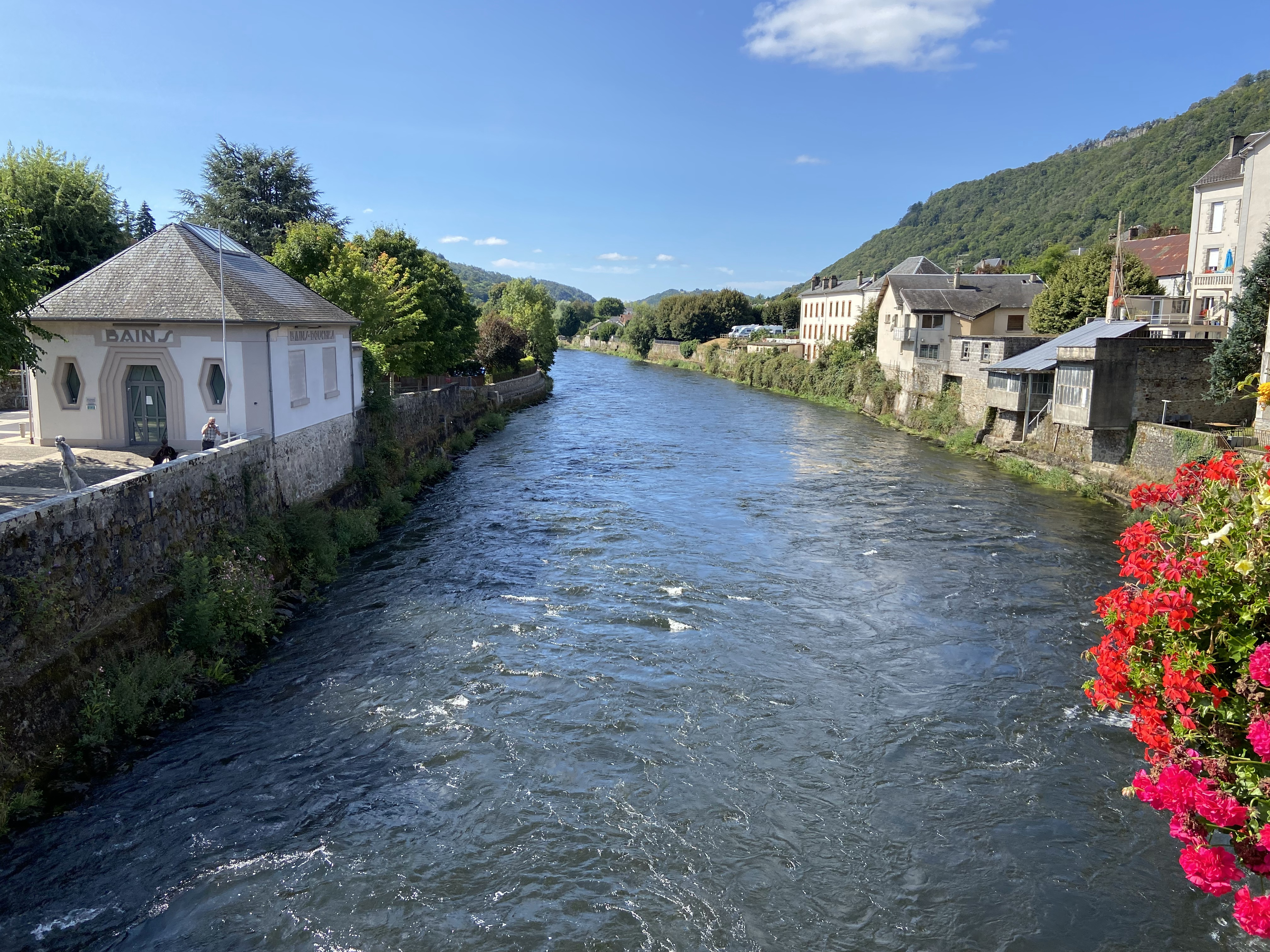
Bort-les-Orgues

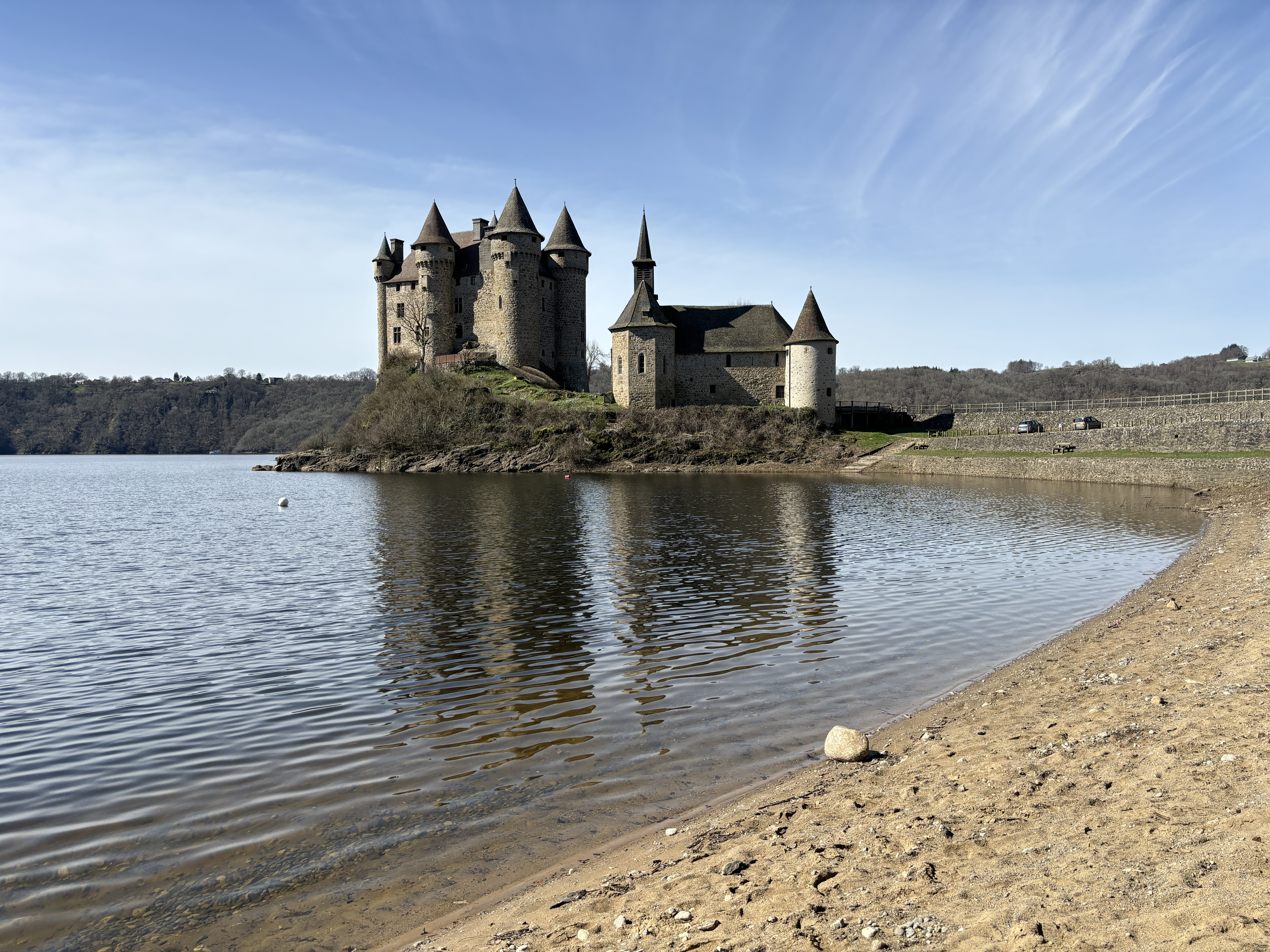
Château_de_Val

== People ==
People who were born or have significantly lived in Corrèze include, in alphabetical order:

- Étienne Baluze (1630–1718), scholar and personal librarian of Colbert
- Guillaume Marie Anne Brune (1763–1815), marshal of France, marshal of the Empire and godfather of author Alexandre Dumas
- Jean Cazeneuve (1915–2005), philosopher and sociologist, president of the ORTF and of TF1
- Jacques Chirac (1932–2019), deputy to the Assemblée Nationale for Corrèze (1967–1995), President of the departement's General Council (1970–1979), Prime Minister of France (1974–1976 and 1986–1988), Mayor of Paris (1977–1995) and 22nd President of the French Republic (1995–2007)
- Bernadette Chirac (1933– ), member of the departement's General Council and aide to the mayor of Sarran
- Pope Clement VI (1291–1352), 198th pope, born Pierre Roger in Rosiers-d'Égletons
- In 1879 Adolphe Clément-Bayard built an iron smelter in Tulle to supply his Parisian cycle manufacturing business, but he did not have sufficient finance to make it viable.
- Marcel Conche (1922–2022), philosopher
- Bernard de Ventadour (1135–1195), a famous troubadour born at the castle of Ventadour
- Jacques Delors (1925–2023), economist and politician, 8th President of the European Commission (1985–1994), father of socialist leader Martine Aubry
- Thomas Domingo (1985– ), French international rugby union player
- Guillaume Dubois (1656–1723), cardinal and statesman, Prime Minister of France during the Régence
- Léon Eyrolles (1861–1945), entrepreneur and politician
- David Feuerwerker (1912–1980), Rabbi and resistance member
- Antoinette Feuerwerker (1912–2003), lawyer and resistance member
- Eugène Freyssinet (1879–1962), structural and civil engineer, major pioneer of prestressed concrete
- Pope Gregory XI (1329–1378), 201st pope and last French pope, born Pierre Roger de Beaufort in Rosiers-d'Egletons
- Cédric Heymans (1978– ), French international rugby union player
- François Hollande (1954– ), deputy for Corrèze (1988–1993 and 1997–2012), mayor of Tulle (2001–2008), President of the department's General Council (2008–2012), leader of the Socialist Party (1997–2008), 24th President of the French Republic (2012–2017)
- The House of La Tour d'Auvergne, viscounts of Turenne
- The House of Noailles, dukes of Noailles and Ayen, which provided three marshals of France, one admiral of France and one archbishop of Paris
- Pope Innocent VI (1295–1362), 199th pope, born Étienne Aubert in Beyssac
- Laurent Koscielny (1985– ), footballer who plays for Arsenal in the Premier League
- Pierre-André Latreille (1762–1833), zoologist and entomologist
- André Malraux (1901–1976), writer, adventurer and statesman, member of the French Resistance in Corrèze during the Second World War
- Max Mamers (1943), born in Objat, racing driver, two-time champion of France of rallycross, organizer of the Andros Trophy and the Paris-Corrèze
- Jean-Antoine Marbot (1754–1800), general of the French Army and politician, deputy of Correze in the Legislative Assembly, deputy of Corrèze in the Council of the Ancients, twice elected President of the Council of the Ancients
- Antoine Adolphe Marcelin Marbot (1781–1844), general of the French Army
- Jean-Baptiste Antoine Marcelin Marbot (1782–1854), general of the French Army, author of the famous Memoirs of General Marbot
- Edmond Michelet (1899–1970), politician and statesman, who did the first act of resistance of World War II in France by distributing tracts calling to continue the war in all Brive-la-Gaillarde's mailboxes on 17 June 1940, one day before Charles de Gaulle's Appeal of 18 June
- Richard Millet (1953— ), novelist and essayist, born in Viam.
- Marie-Anne Montchamp (1957– ), politician, former Secretary of State for Solidarities and Social Cohesion (2010–2012)
- Marie-Thérèse Nguyễn Hữu Thị Lan (1914–1963), the last empress consort of the Nguyễn dynasty in Vietnam
- Robert Nivelle (1856–1924), general, commander-in-chief of the French armies on the Western Front in 1917
- Valérie Pécresse (1967– ), politician, former Minister of Higher Education and Research (2007–2011), former Minister of the Budget and Government's Spokeswoman (2011–2012)
- Edmond Perrier (1844–1921), anatomist and zoologist
- Henri Queuille (1884–1970), mayor of Neuvic (1912–1965), deputy for Corrèze (1914–1935 and 1946–1958), senator for Corrèze (1935–1941) who refused to vote full powers to Pétain in 1940, three times Prime Minister of France during the Fourth Republic
- Eric Rohmer (1920–2010), film director
- Patrick Sébastien (1953– ), born in Brive-la-Gaillarde, man of television, singer
- René Teulade (1931–2014), member of the Senate
- Denis Tillinac (1947– ), author and journalist
- Pierre Tornade (1930–2012), actor, born in Bort-les-Orgues
- Jean-Baptiste Treilhard (1742–1810), political figure of the French Revolution, member of Committee of Public Safety, president of the Convention that judged and sentenced to death King Louis XVI, member of the Directory and one of the redactors of the Napoleonic codes; he is buried in the Panthéon
- Marius Vazeilles (1881–1973), politician and archeologist
- Varg Vikernes (1973– ), Norwegian musician and writer
- Cédric Villani (1973– ), mathematician, Fields Medalist in 2010
- Pierre Villepreux (1943– ), rugby player
- Rose Warfman (1916–2016), resistance member
- Dimitri Yachvili (1980– ), French international rugby union player

== See also ==
- Arrondissements of the Corrèze department
- Cantons of the Corrèze department
- Communes of the Corrèze department
