= Aubazines =

- Commune
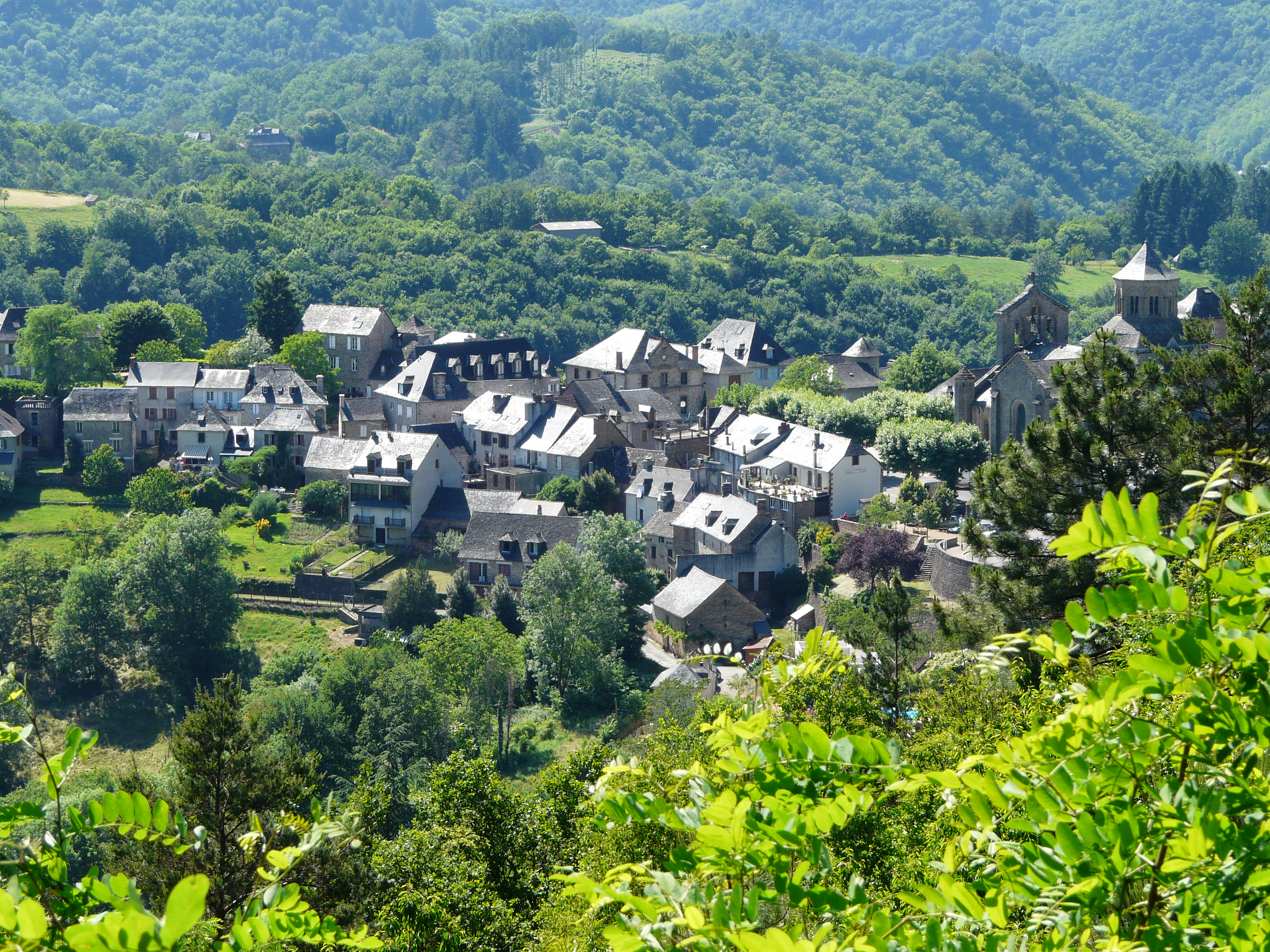
- A general view of Aubazine

- Coat of arms
- Location of Aubazines
- Location within France Location within Nouvelle-Aquitaine
- Coordinates: 45°10′26″N 1°40′16″E
- Country: France
- Region: Nouvelle-Aquitaine
- Department: Corrèze
- Arrondissement: Brive-la-Gaillarde
- Canton: Midi Corrézien
- Intercommunality: CC Midi Corrézien

Government
  - Mayor (2026–32): Bernard Larbre
- Area^{1}: 14.07 km^{2} (5.43 sq mi)
- Elevation: 345 m (1,132 ft)
- Highest elevation: 522 m (1,713 ft)
- Lowest elevation: 126 m (413 ft)
- Population (2023): 856
  - Density: 60.8/km^{2} (158/sq mi)
- Time zone: UTC+01:00 (CET)
  - Summer (DST): UTC+02:00 (CEST)
- INSEE/Postal code: 19013 /19190
- ^{1} French Land Register data, which excludes lakes, ponds, glaciers > 1 km^{2} (0.386 sq mi or 247 acres) and river estuaries.

Aubazines (French pronunciation: [obazin]; Occitan: Obasina), also spelled Aubazine, is a commune in the Corrèze department in the Nouvelle-Aquitaine region of central France.

== Geography ==
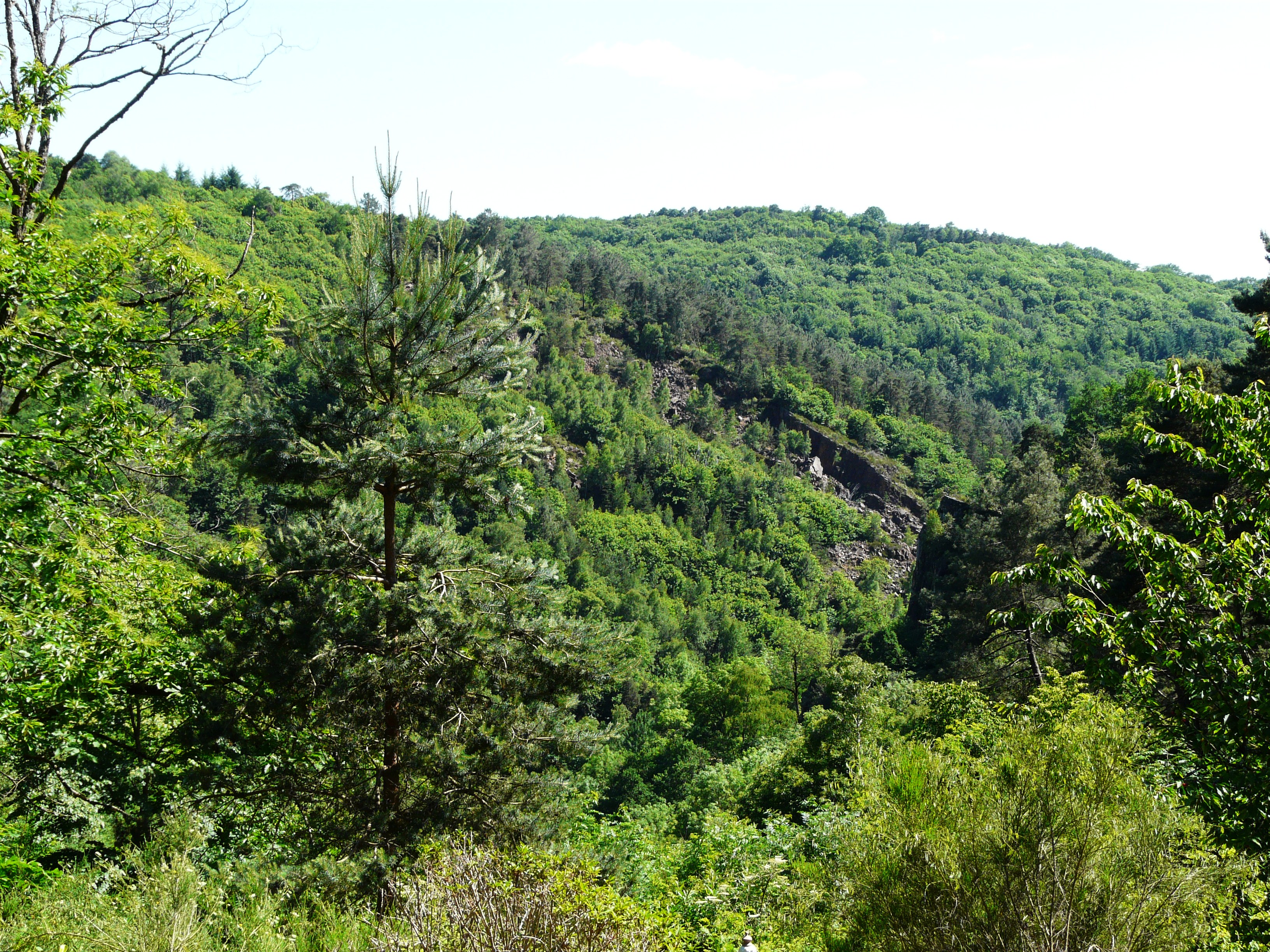
The gorges of the Coiroux.

Aubazines is a commune in the Massif Central located some 10 km east by north-east of Brive-la-Gaillarde and 12 km south-west of Tulle. The D1089 highway passes through the north-west of the commune going from Malemort-sur-Corrèze to Tulle. However, access to the village is by the D130 branching off the D1089, going south to the village, and continuing south to Beynat. The D48 also goes east from the village to Le Chastang with the D48E branching off it in the east of the commune to go north to Cornil. The D14E1 also goes south-west from the village to join the D14.

A railway line passes through the commune parallel to the D1089 and the station for Aubazines is at Aubazine-Saint-Hilaire station in the neighbouring commune Saint-Hilaire-Peyroux. The line is served by the TER Nouvelle-Aquitaine trains towards Brive-la-Gaillarde, Tulle, Ussel and Bordeaux.

The village is in the south of the commune on a promontory overlooking the Coiroux at a height of over 150 metres. Apart from the village there are the hamlets of: Pauliac Bas, Pauliac Haut, Villieres, Vergonzac, Le Varachou, Rochesseux, Chastagnol, Quatre Routes, and Les Vayres. The commune is mixed forest and farmland.

The Corrèze river forms the north-western border of the commune as it flows south-west to join the Vézère west of Brive-la-Gaillarde. A number of streams rise in the commune to join the Corrèze including the Ruisseau de la Geinde, 2.7 km long, which rises near Quatre-Routes and flows north to join the Ruisseau de Brauze in Cornil commune which flows to the Corrèze, the Ruisseau Français, and the Canal des Moines which branches from the Coiroux.

The lowest altitude of the commune is 126 metres in the west where the Corrèze leaves the commune. The highest points are 520 metres high on the Puy de Pauliac which dominates the area, and in the south-east next to Le Chastang near a place called la Jarouste.

== History ==
The village of Aubazines, which had a church, became a commune in the French Revolution in 1790 through the dismantling of the parish of Cornil but it lacked Vital records until 1 March 1792.

Aubazines, formerly written Obazine, has its origin in the foundation of a monastery by Étienne de Vielzot in the 12th century. The monastery was affiliated shortly after to the Cistercian order. Very soon an associated convent of nuns was established in the village of Coyroux a few hundred metres away. The two monasteries existed until the Revolution. Formerly spelled Obazine the parish depended on Cornil.

The site of the monastic institutions and their dependencies have been the object of archaeological excavations and extensive studies in the last third of the 20th century under the direction of Professor of medieval history Bernadette Barrière.

=== Aubazine-Saint-Hilaire Railway Station ===
The village of Gare d'Aubazine, although located in the commune of Saint-Hilaire-Peyroux is an integral part of the history of Aubazines and of Dampniat than that of Saint-Hilaire.

The railway station was established at a place called Confolens however, as the station was primarily to serve Aubazines even though it was on the territory of the neighbouring commune, the council demanded a composite name. The railway acceded to the demand and the stop which was called Aubazine-Saint-Hilaire-Peyroux became Aubazine thereafter. Saint-Hilaire-Peyroux have their own stop at Pont Bonnel.

Before 1840, the date of the opening of Route nationale N89 (later D1089), there was nothing at the bottom of this valley other than the worn-out mills of: Confolens in Dampniat commune, Claredent in Aubazines commune, and Jayle in Malemort-sur-Corrèze commune, which were accessible only on narrow, bumpy, and steep slopes by goods wagons. Horses, mules, and donkeys circulated more often than carts.

The village, now called Gare d'Aubazine was rather poorly named. The SNCF station is located on the right bank of the Corrèze in the territory of Saint-Hilaire-Peyroux while the left bank belongs largely to Dampniat with the nearest village located 2 km away.

The Confolens bridge and paper mill added to progress together with the railway at the end of the 19th century and in 1912 the establishment of a railhead for the departmental tram line going to Turenne then Beaulieu-sur-Dordogne via Le Bosplos completed this action. The Tacot (Jalopy) had disappeared by 1932, replaced by a bus and the agglomeration of the Gare d'Aubazine retained its thriving business. New houses were built and a school with two classes was opened for the children. Their parents climbed to Dampniat to learn to read.

In June 1944 maquisards destroyed the Claredent railway bridge, blocking a German armoured train and preventing convoys of equipment from the manufacture of weapons at Tulle from being quickly transported to their destination on the front or the Rhine.

=== Heraldry ===
Arms of Aubazines	Blazon: Party per pale, at first Gules, a sun in his splendour of Or with two mullets the same all posed in pale; at second Azure a crescent moon of Argent with two mullets the same all posed in pale.

== Administration ==
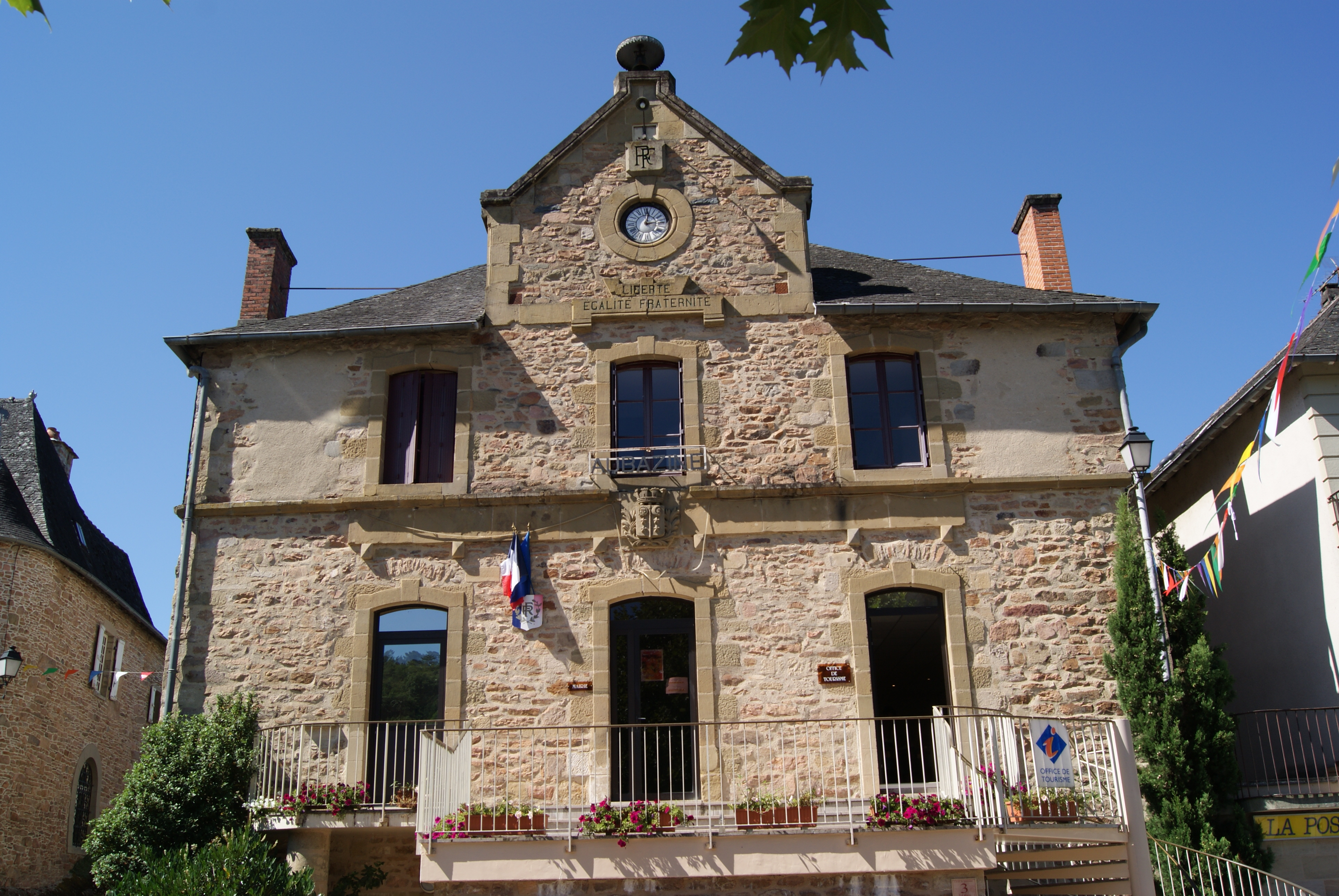
The Town Hall

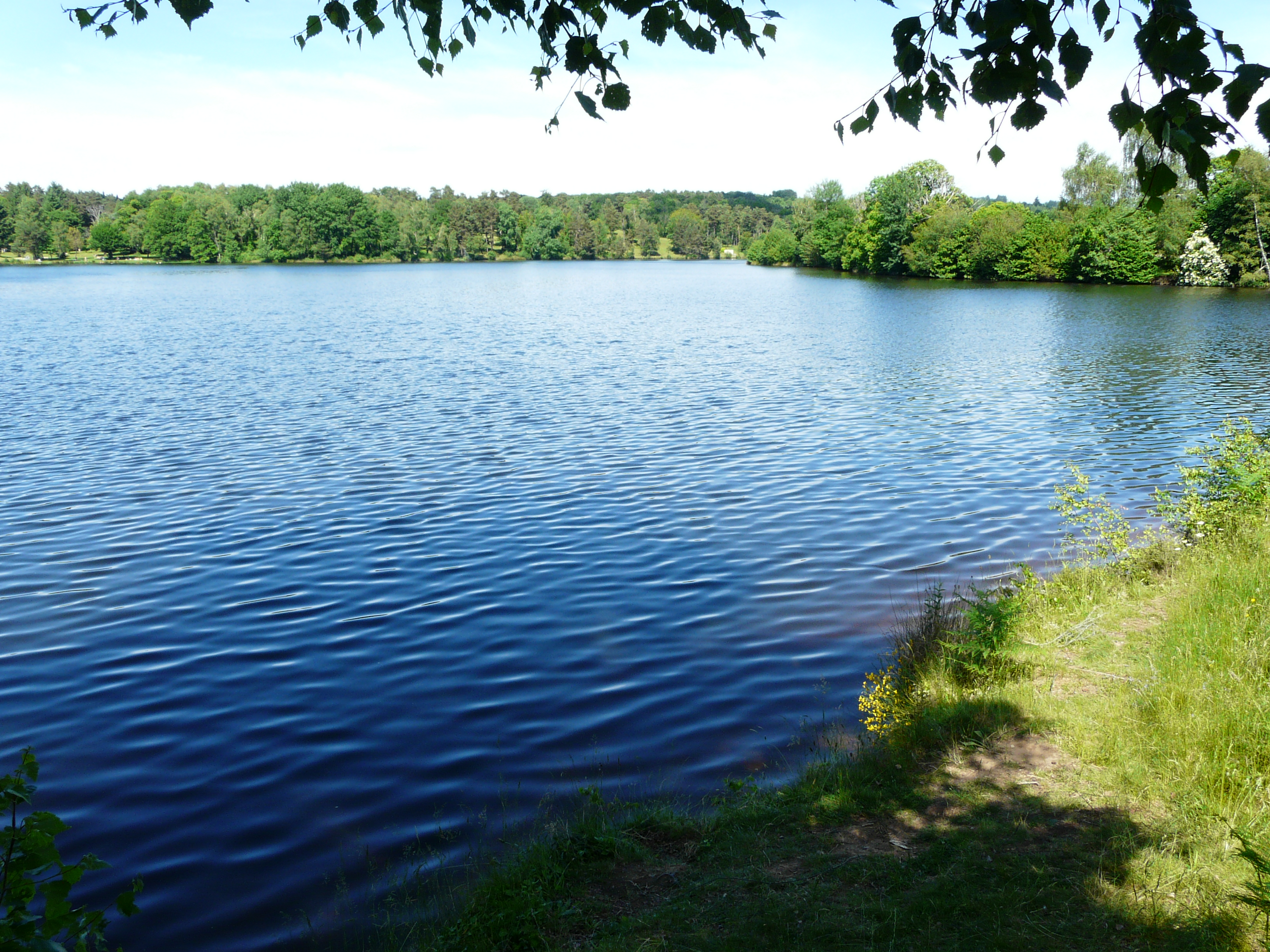
Lake Coiroux

List of Successive Mayors

From	To	Name	Party	Position
1799	1812	Jean Leguerenne		
1817	1819	Jean-Baptiste Dejouvenel		
1825	1825	Pierre Brugeille		Farmer
1849	1852	Aubin Pierre Louradour		
1853	1865	Aimard Epiphane Louradour		
1870	1870	Jean-Maxim Brugeille		Notary
1870		Jean-Louis Auguste Lafon		
1874	1876	Jean-Baptiste Lavergne		
1890	1944	Jean-Baptiste Laumond	RS	Notary
1893	1893	François Firmin Delmas		Lawyer; MP from 1928 to 1936; Magistrate of Andorra
1945	1959	Raymond Bouillaguet		
1959	1977	Emile Bouy		
1977	1995	Léon Canard		
1995	2020	Jean-Pierre Chouzenoux	PS	
2020	2026	Damien Chanourdie		
2026	2032	Bernard Larbre		

== Demography ==
The inhabitants of the commune are known as Aubazinois or Aubazinoises in French.

Historical population

Year	Pop.	±% p.a.
1793	746	—
1821	865	+0.53%
1846	920	+0.25%
1872	913	−0.03%
1901	883	−0.12%
1926	808	−0.35%
1946	752	−0.36%
1962	677	−0.65%
1968	669	−0.20%

Year	Pop.	±% p.a.
1975	642	−0.59%
1982	673	+0.68%
1990	788	+1.99%
1999	732	−0.82%
2007	807	+1.23%
2012	907	+2.36%
2017	914	+0.15%
2023	856	−1.09%

Source: EHESS and INSEE

== Culture and heritage ==
=== Civil heritage ===
The commune has two structures that are registered as historical monuments:

- A Stone circle at Puy de Pauliac (Neolithic)
- The Canal des Moines (12th century) with a length of 1.7 km, it was built to supply the village - it is the only canal of its kind still operating in Europe. It dominates the Gorges of Coiroux.

Other sites of interest are:

- The Dolmen of Rochesseux.
- The Saut de la bergère rock (overlooking the Canal des Moines), a 70m high cliff where, according to legend, a shepherdess was thrown from to escape dishonour.
- The Tourist centre and Lake Coiroux.
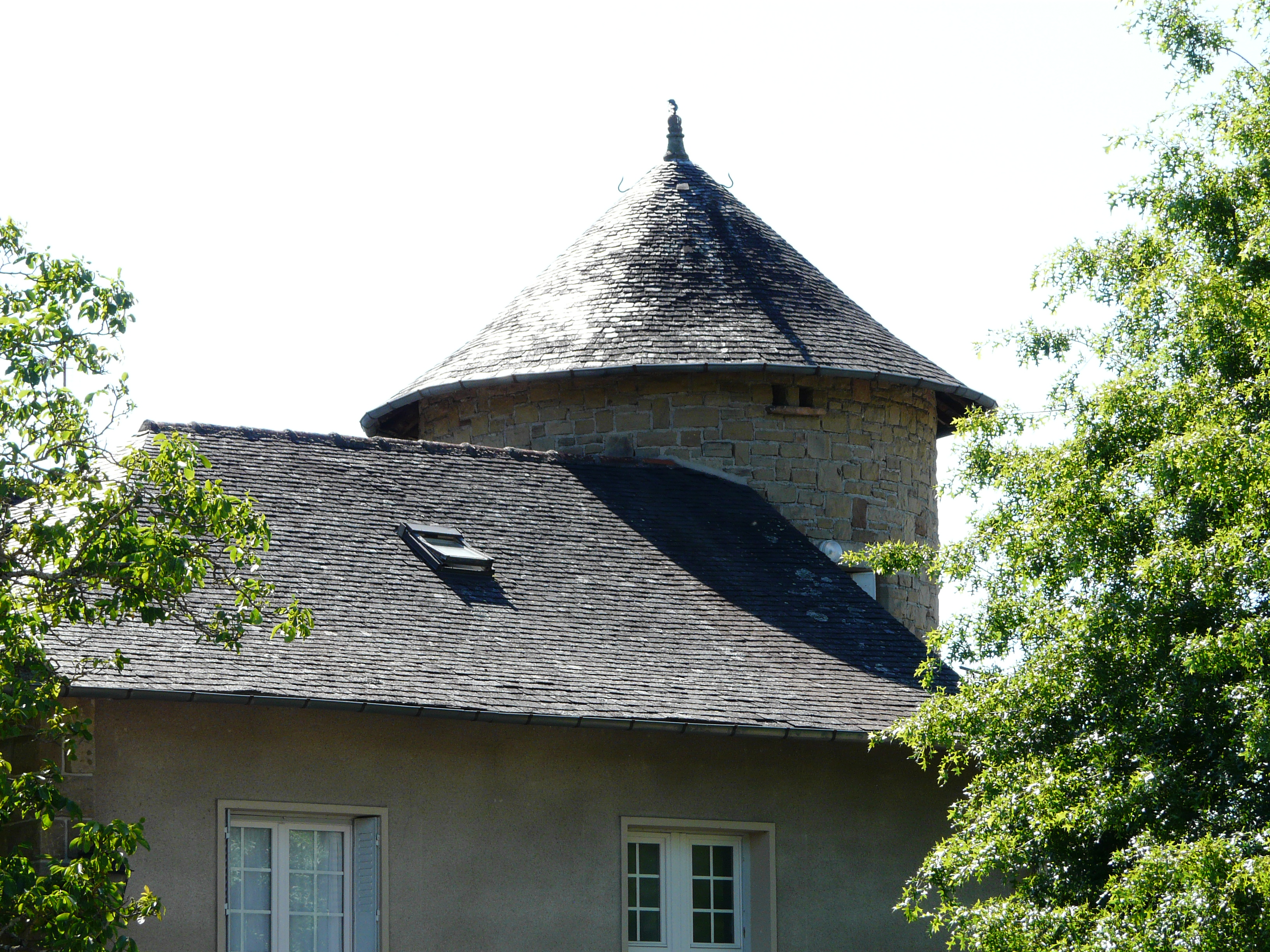
A Dovecote

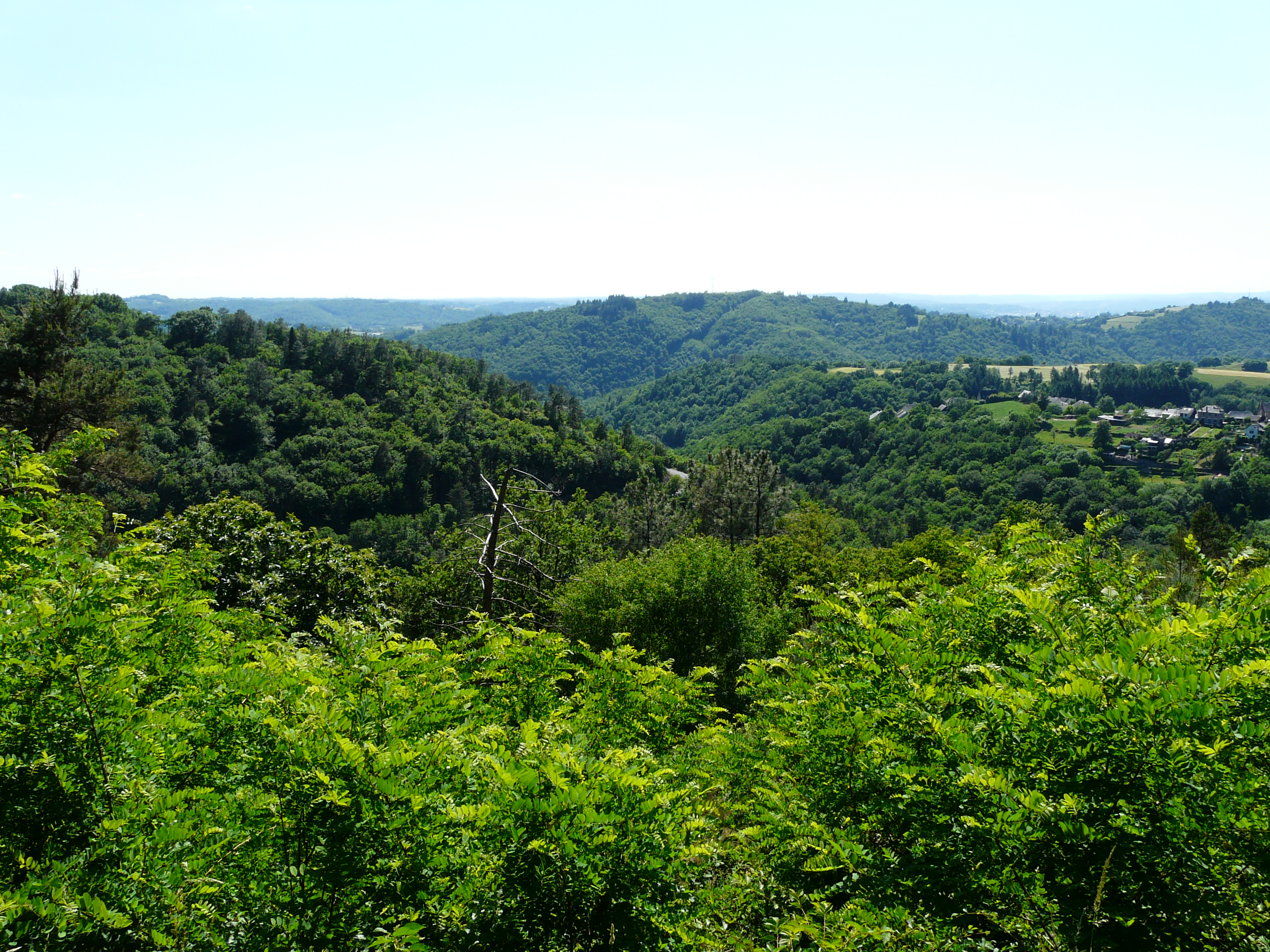
Couroux Gorge

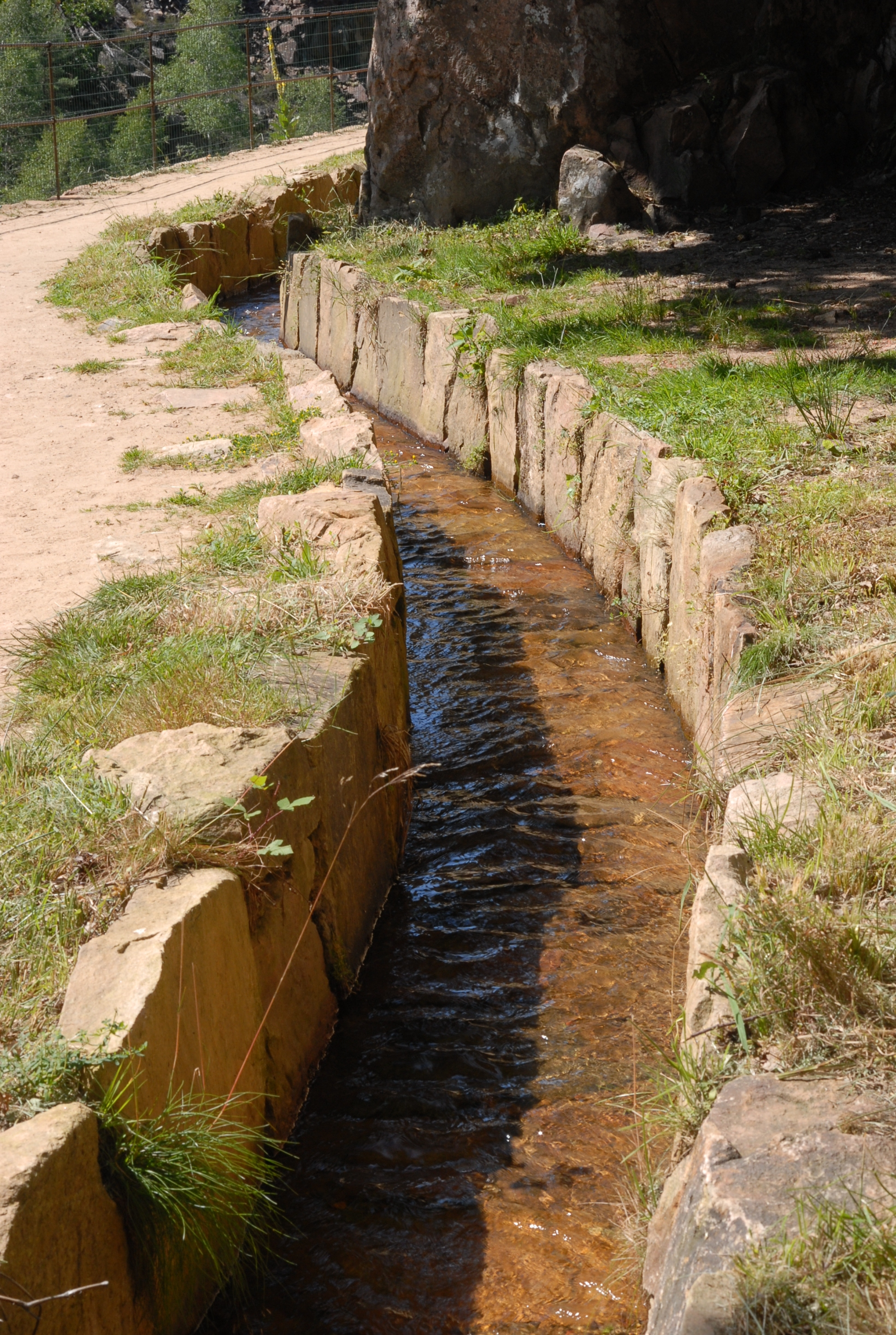
The Canal des Moines

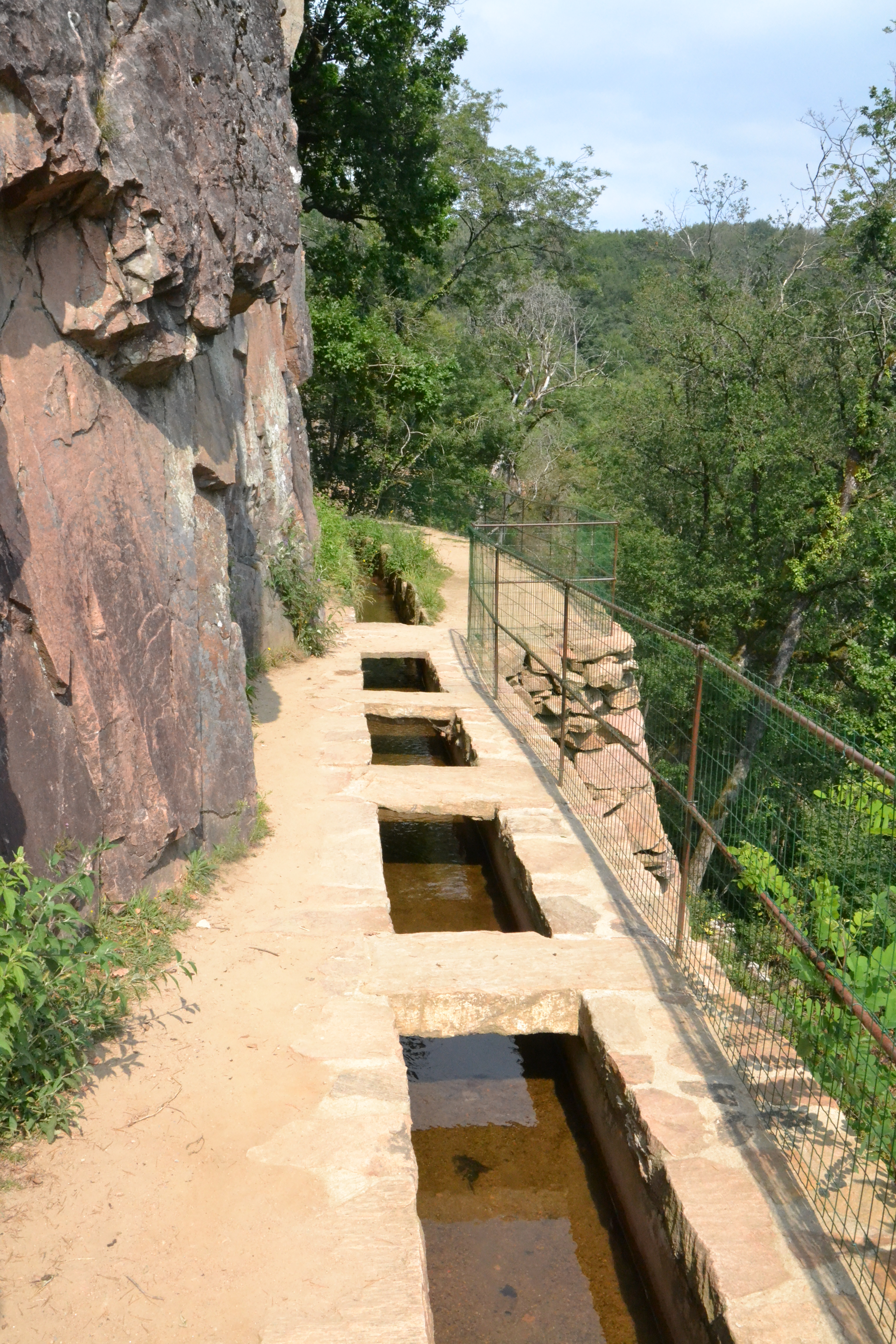
The Canal des Moines

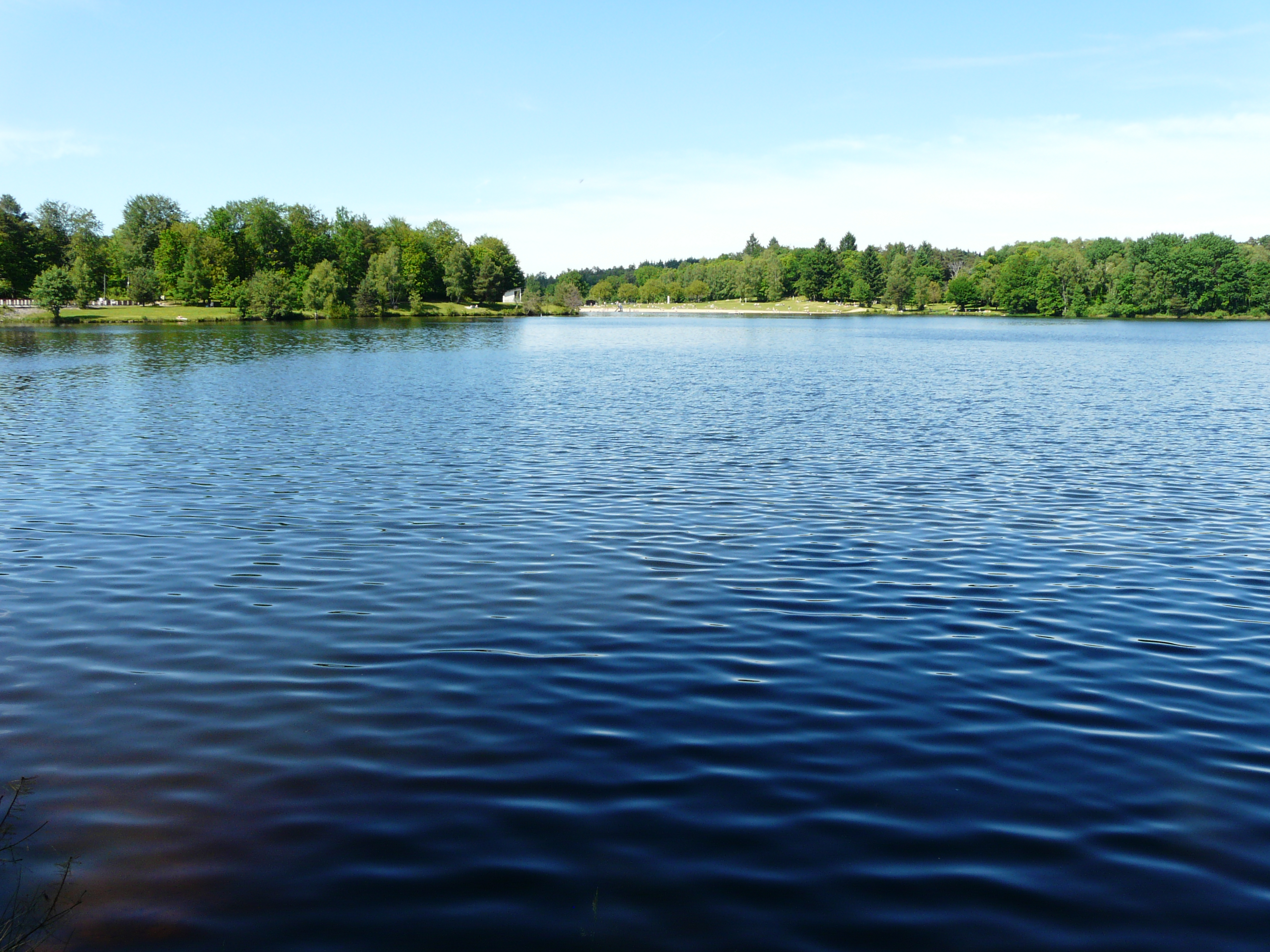
Lake Coiroux

=== Religious heritage ===
Two religious buildings are registered as historical monuments and one more contains historical objects:

- Remains of the old Monastery of Coyroux (12th century). It contains many items that are registered as historical objects:
  - Statue: Sainte Marie-Madeleine (15th century)
  - Statue: Nicodème (15th century)
  - Group sculpture: Virgin and Saint John (15th century)
  - Group sculpture: Setting on a Tomb (15th century)
- The old Obazine Abbey or Abbey Saint-Etienne (1142) and monastic buildings of the ancient Cistercian abbey founded in 1142 by Saint Etienne, the first abbot. The abbey contains many items registered as historical objects:
  - Group sculpture: Saint Roch (18th century)
  - Statuette: Virgin and child playing with a bird (15th century)
  - Master Altar: Altar, seating, Tabernacle, Pedestal, Statue (18th century)
  - 3 Stalls (17th century)
  - Statue: Saint Etienne of Obazine (18th century)
  - Group sculpture: Virgin of pity (15th century)
  - Bas-relief: Saint Etienne Harding holding the habit of Saint Bernard of Clairvaux (17th century)
  - Bas-relief: Saint Etienne Harding, Abbot of Citeaux, granting the Charter of charity (17th century)
  - Cabinet (12th century)
  - Altar Cross (13th century)
  - 4 plates on a shrine (13th century)
  - Reliquary Cross (19th century)
  - Recumbent Statue: Saint Etienne of Obazine (13th century)
  - Tomb of Etienne of Obazine (13th century)
  - Total of 42 Stalls (17th century)
  - Statue: Virgin (18th century)
  - Pedestal (18th century)
  - 2 Statuettes: Adoring angels (18th century)
  - Tabernacle (18th century)
  - 3 Statues: (1 large 2 small) Christ between 2 angels (18th century)
  - Altar, seating, altar tomb, altar exhibits (18th century)
  - 2 Bas-reliefs: Saint Etienne (17th century)
  - Cabinet in the Sacristy (14th century)
  - Bronze bell (1683)
  - Little bell (1605)
  - Bronze bell (1605)
  - Reliquary Cross (double cross) (12th century)
  - Monumental Painting: Virgin of pity (1466)
  - 25 Stained glass windows (12th century)
  - Group of Stalls (17th century)
- The Parish Church of Notre-Dame contains three items registered as historical object:
  - Statue: Saint John the Baptist (17th century)
  - Retable and Altar seating in the 2nd chapel in the south transept (17th century)
  - Bas-relief: Arms of the Abbey of Aubazines (17th century)
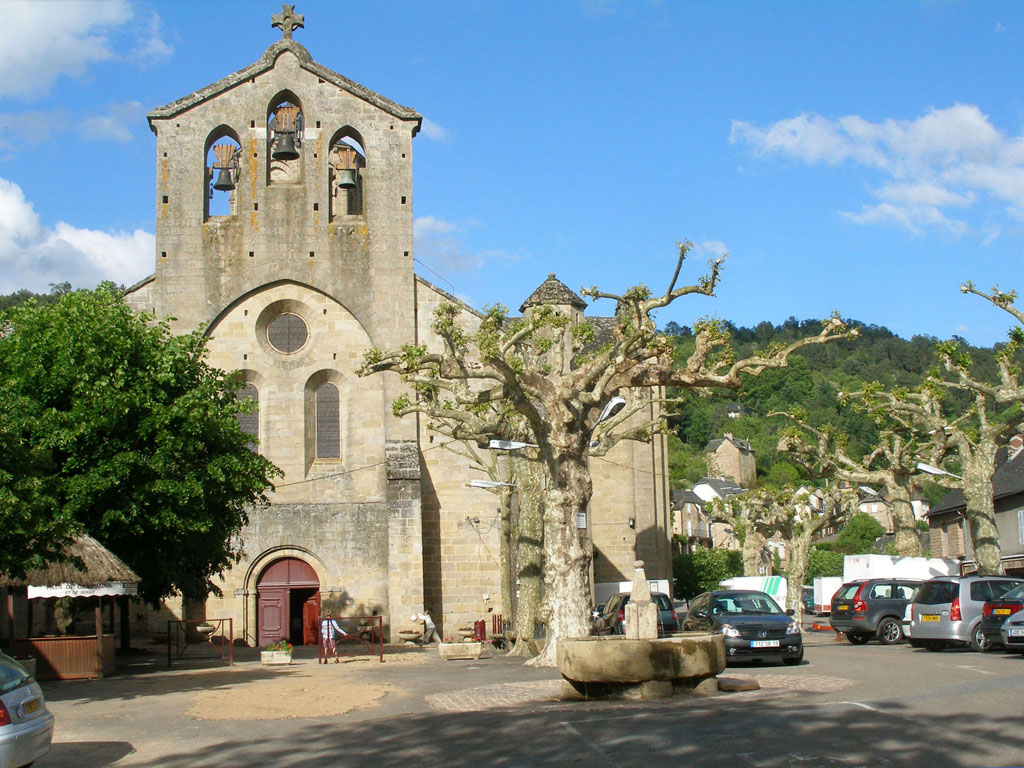
The Cistercian Abbey

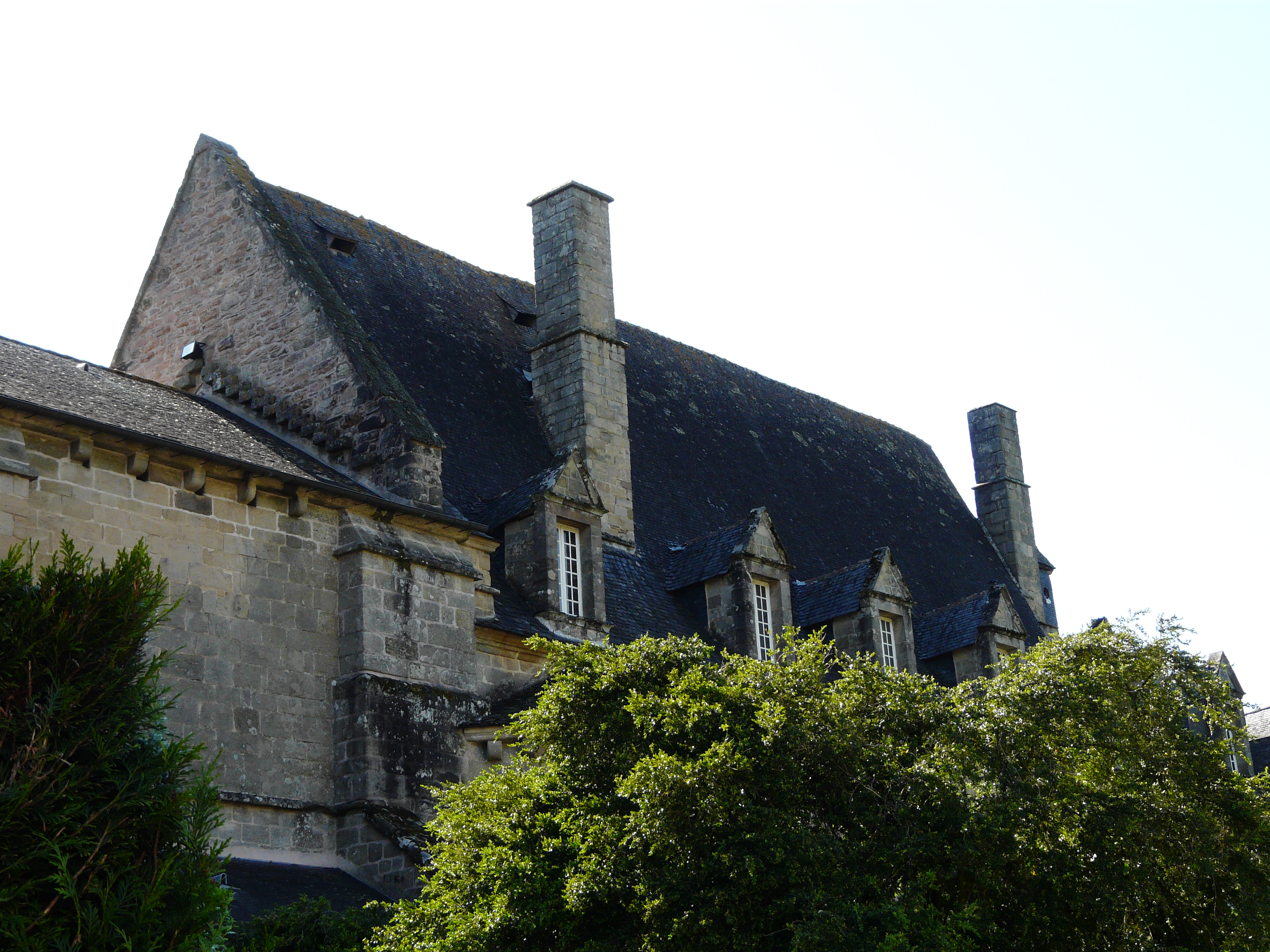
Side view of the Abbey

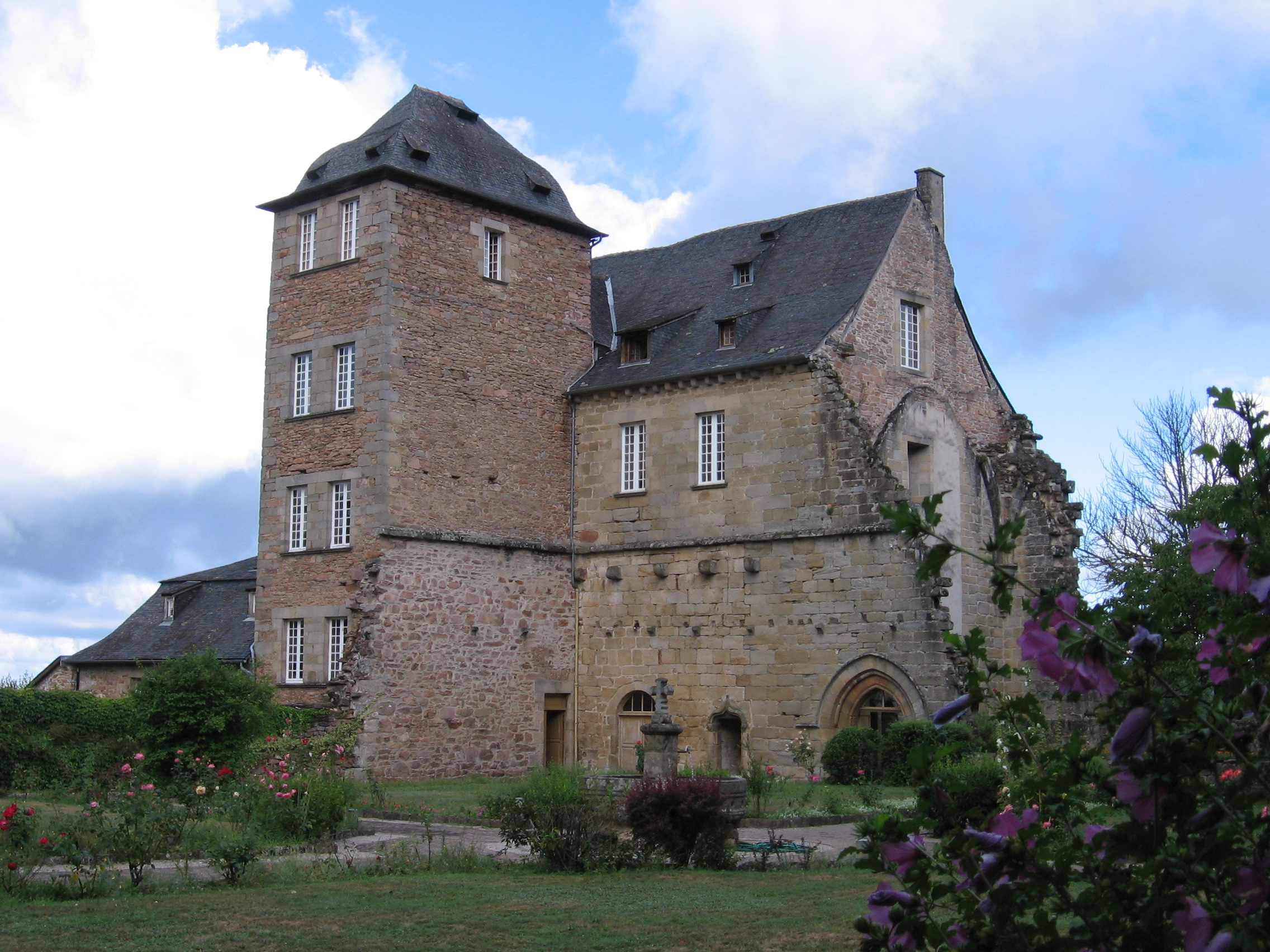
The Abbey lodging

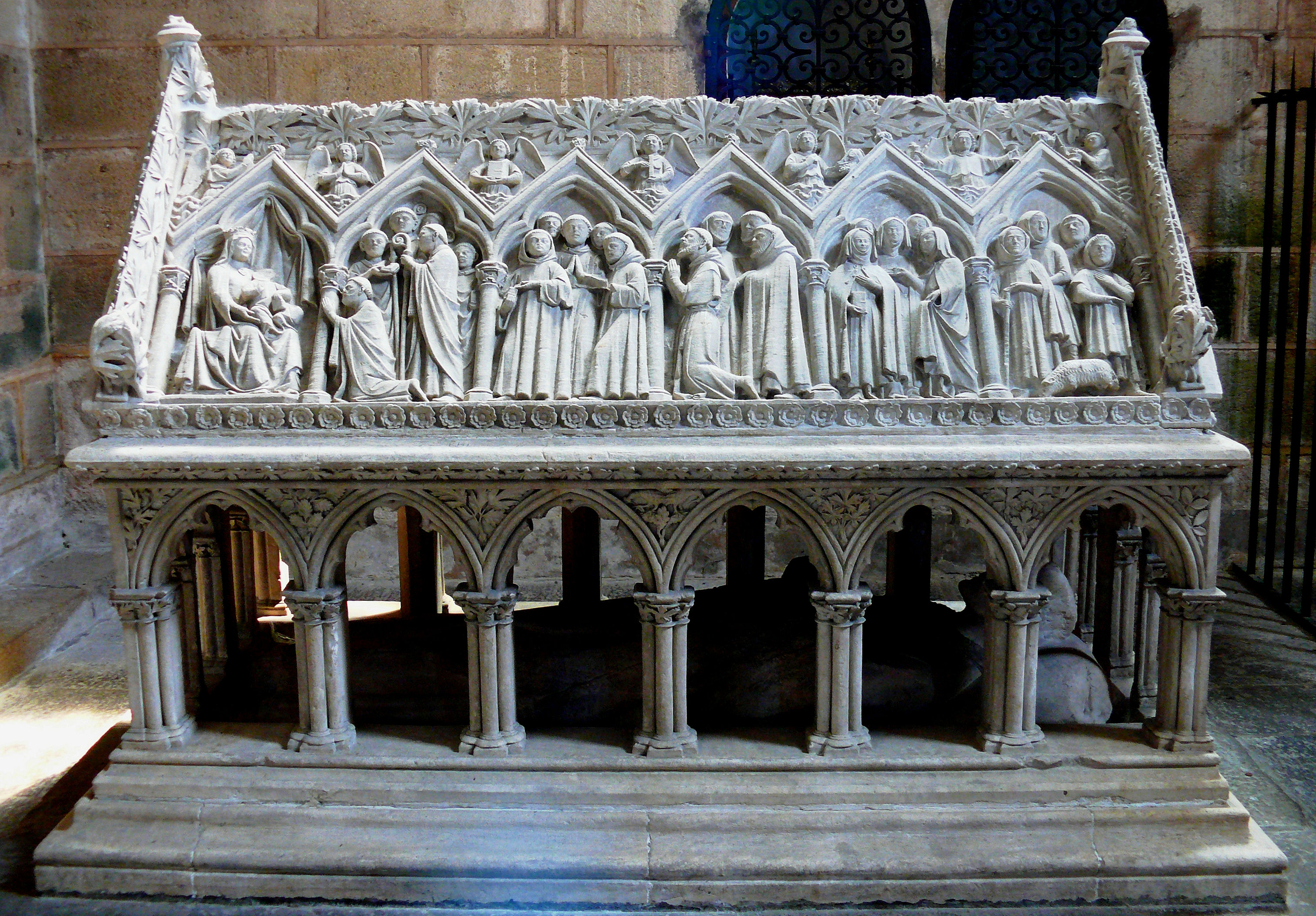
Tomb of Saint Etienne

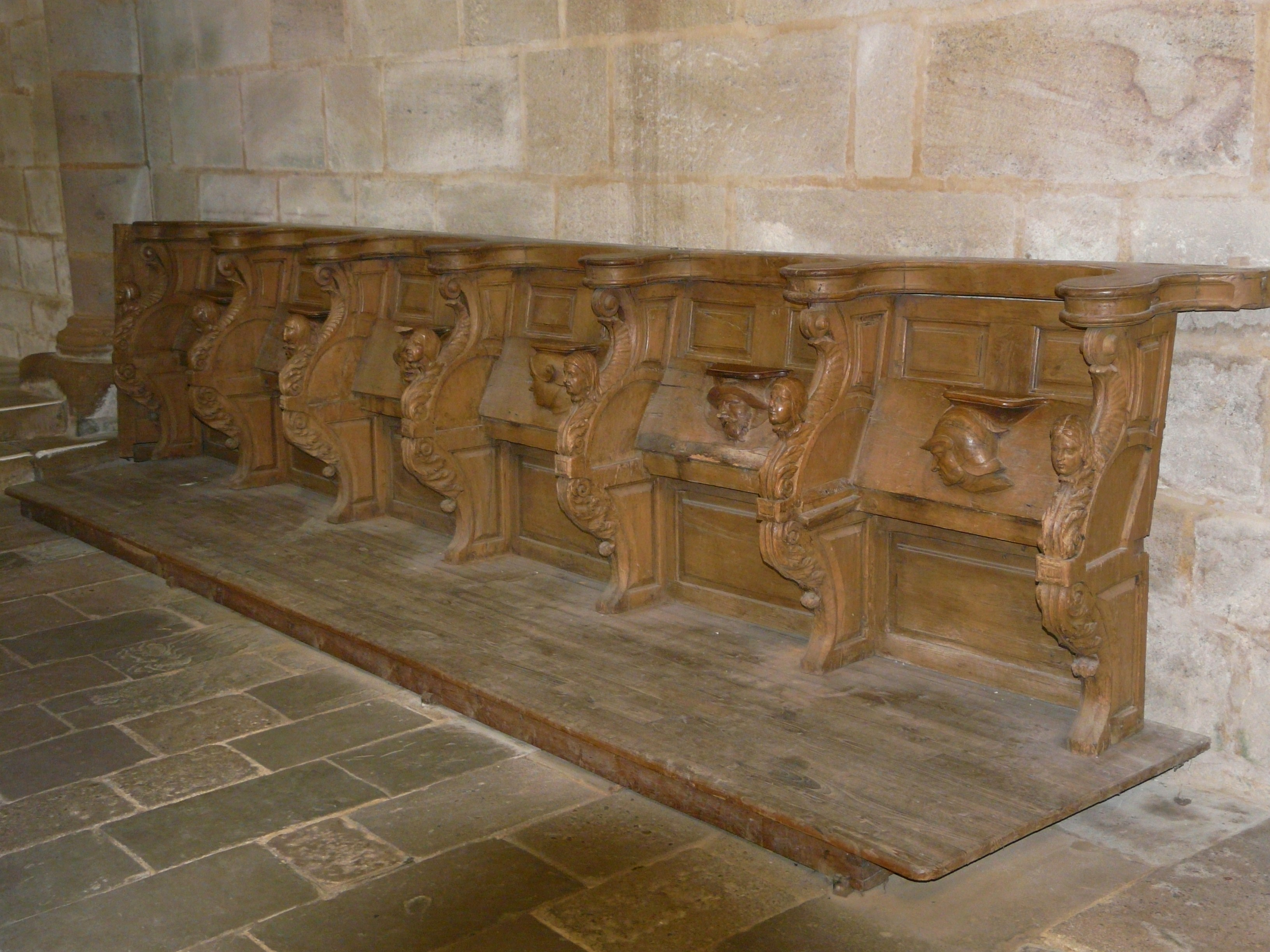
Some of the Stalls in the Abbey

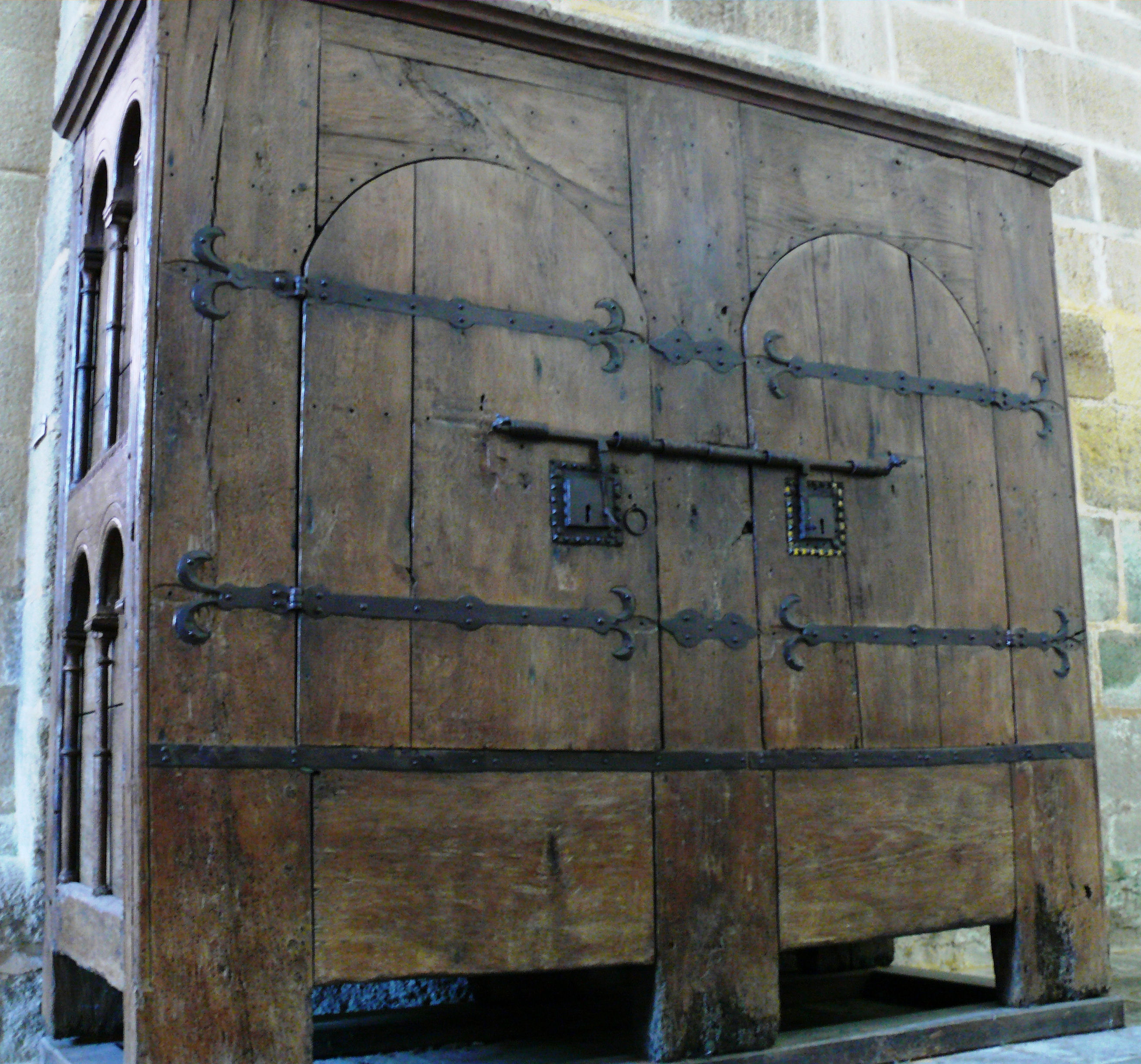
One of the old Cabinets

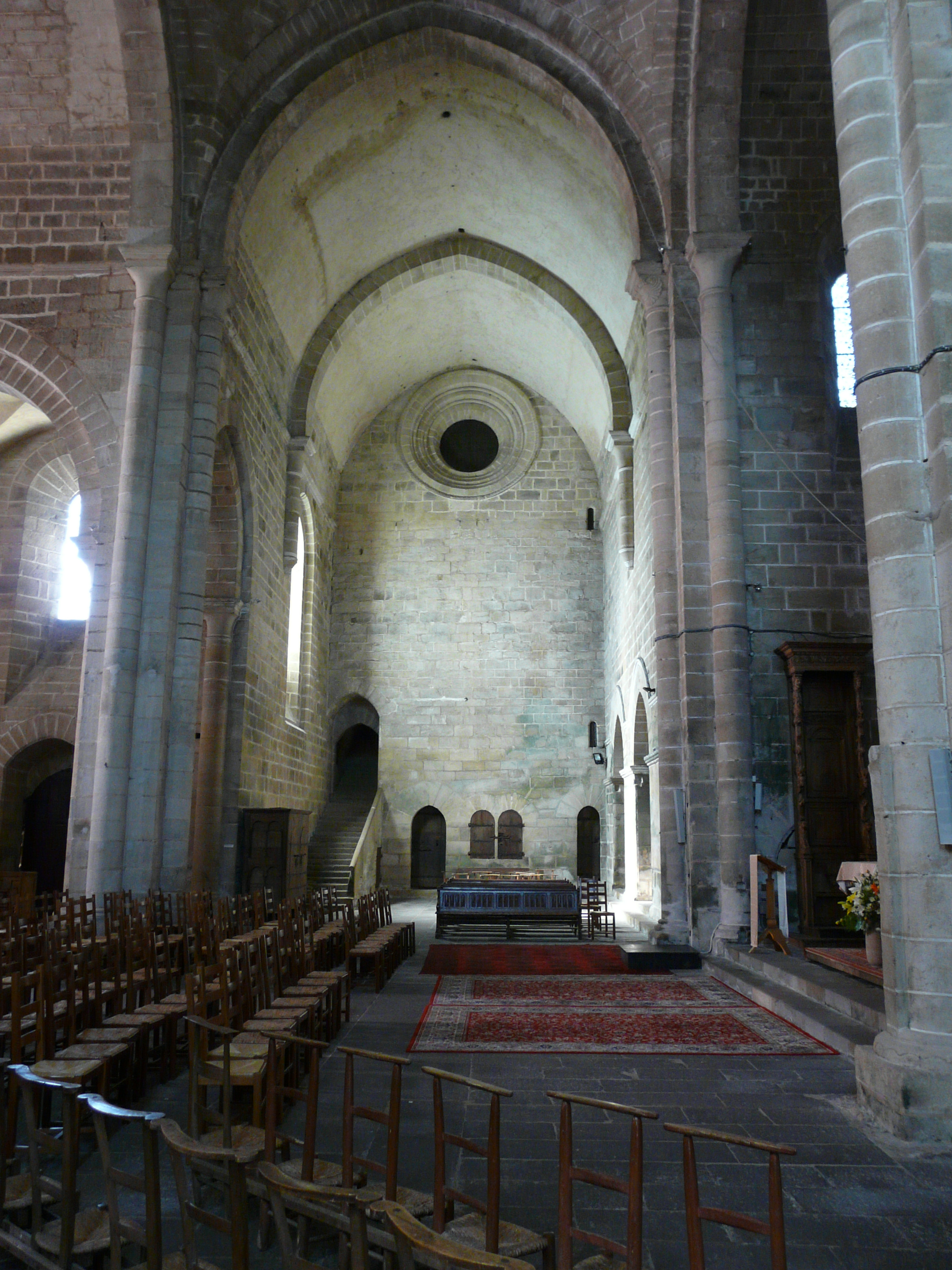
The transept in the Abbey

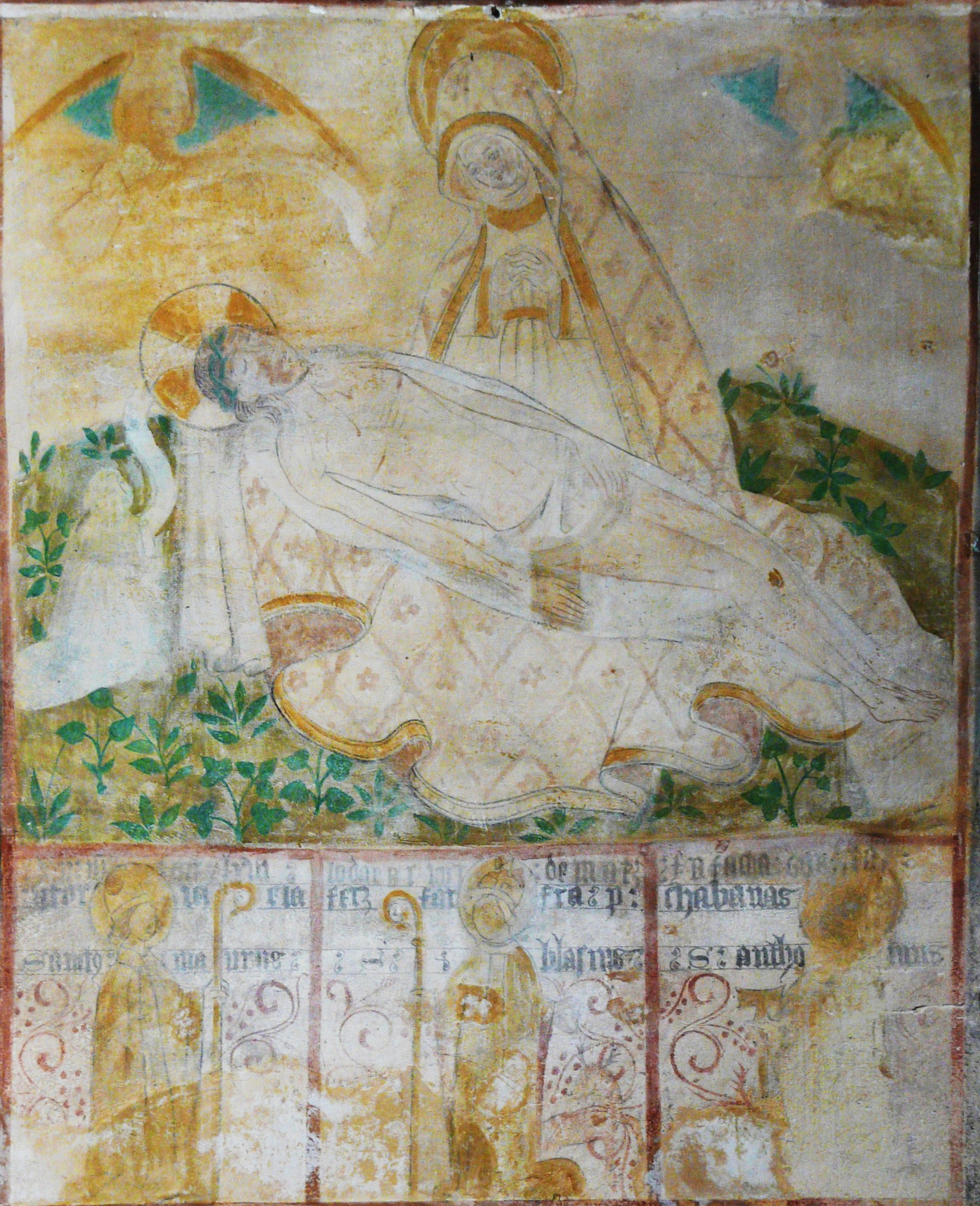
Painting: Virgin of pity

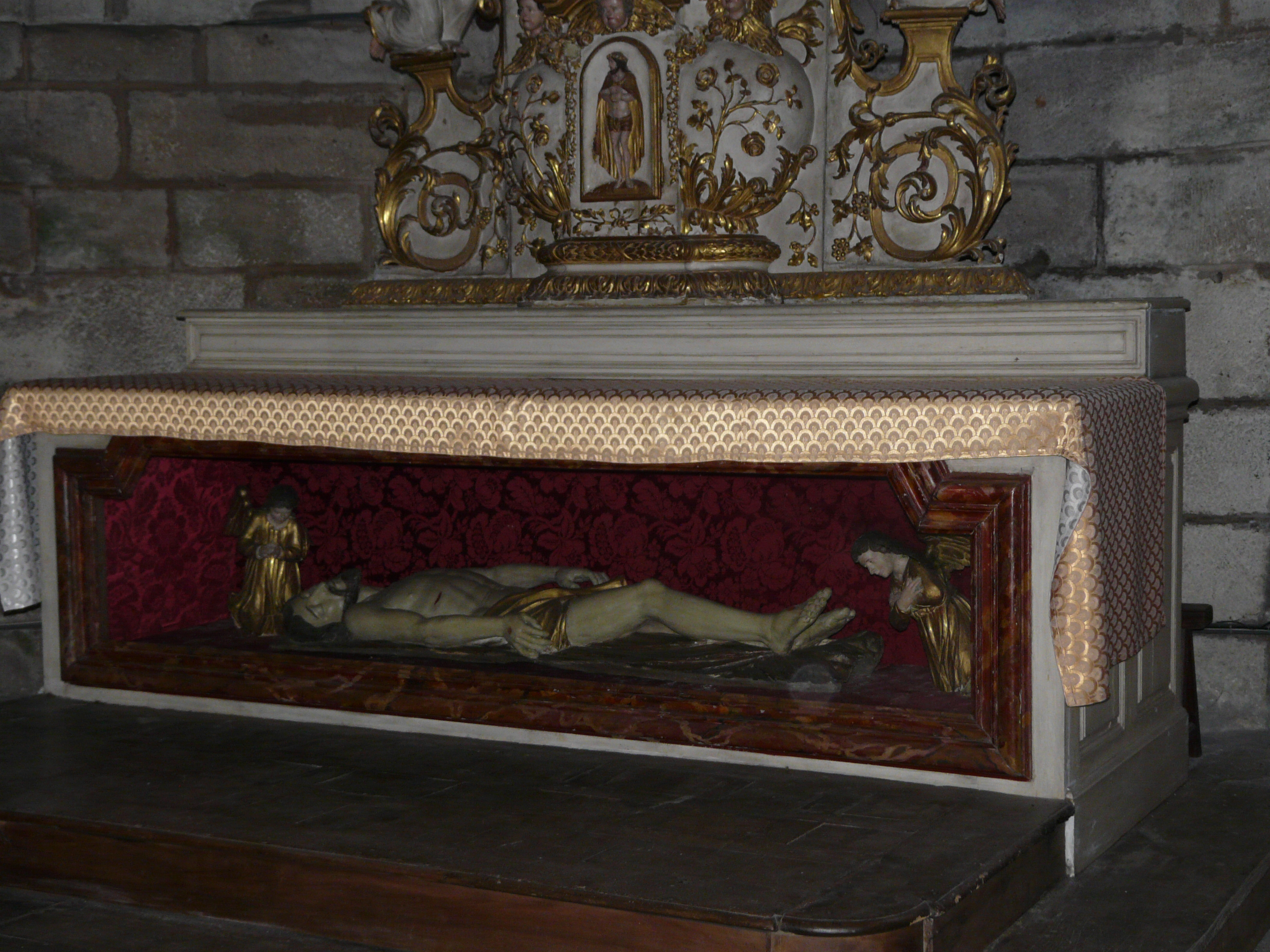
Altar in the Abbey

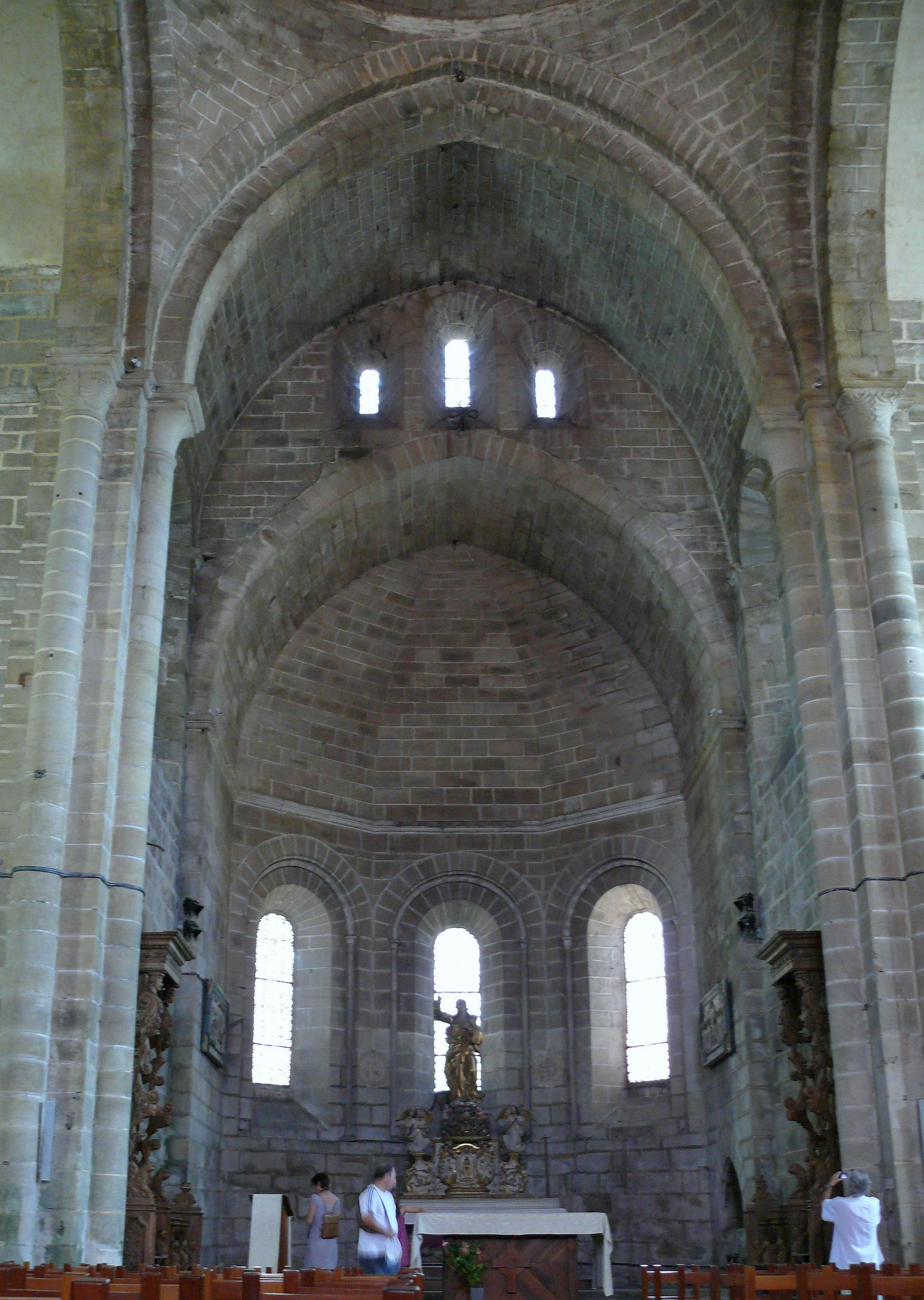
The choir in the abbey

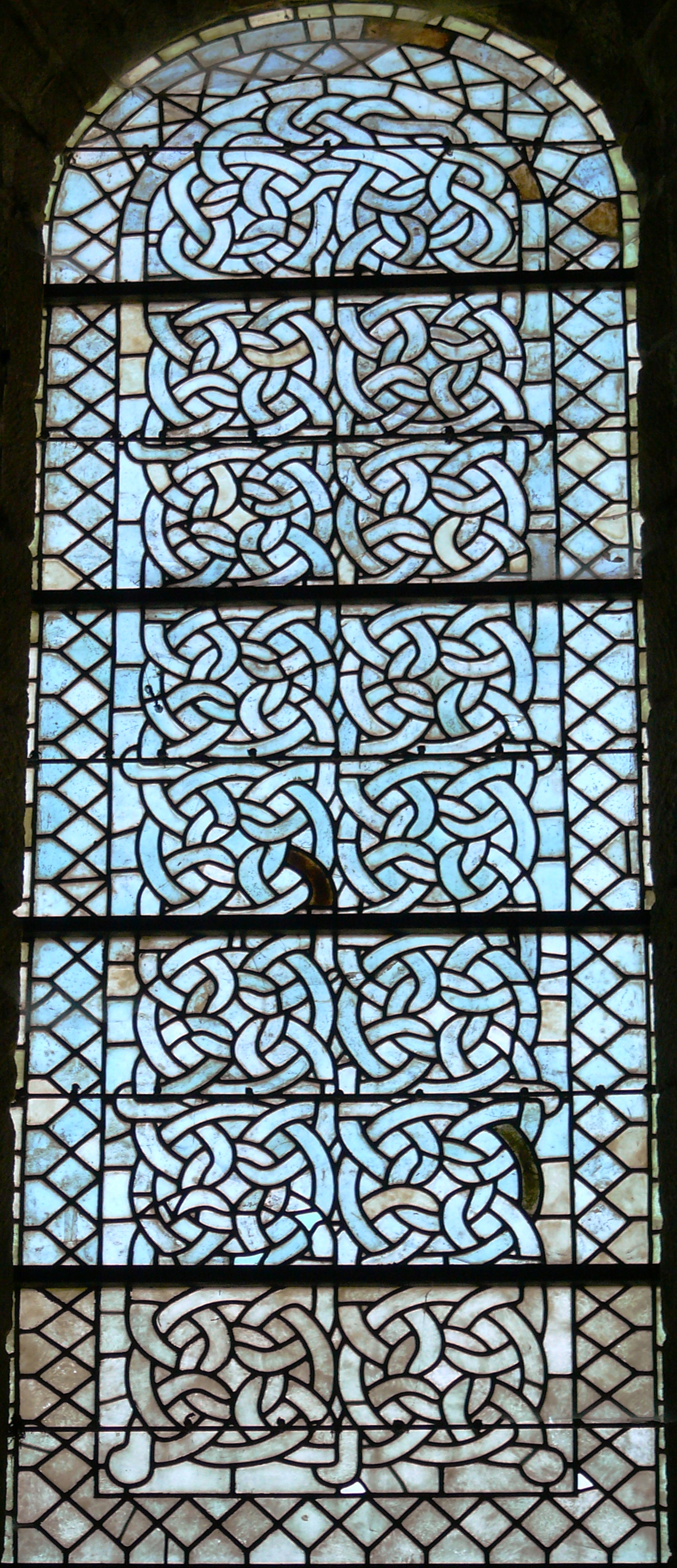
One of the Stained glass windows in the Abbey

== Notable people linked to the commune ==
- Étienne d'Obazine, founder of the Abbey.
- Pierre Brugeilles (1845-1893), born in Aubazines, Mayor of the commune, MP for Corrèze from 1885 to 1889.
- Jean-Baptiste Laumond (1865-1957), Mayor of the commune from 1890 to 1944, MP for Corrèze from 1926 to 1938, Magistrate of Andorra from 1937 to 1940.
- Coco Chanel (1883-1971), Hatmaker and clothes designer, spent part of her youth at the orphanage. in the Abbey and managed by the nuns from Saint-Cœur de Marie.
- Bernadette Barrière (1936-2004), Professor of medieval history, University of Limoges.
- Étienne Jugie, born in Aubazines on 3 May 1878, died at Sorgues on 29 November 1954, known in religion under the name Marin Jugie, (Augustinian of the Assumption) Theologian, author of numerous works, Professor at the Vatican and at Lyon. He worked on the Doctrine of the Assumption and on the Churches of the Orient, studied "Joseph de Maistre and the Greco-Russian Church".
- Thierry Chenavaud, designer and producer of shows since 2007, every year in July the "Cistercian Lights" with huge images at the old monastery of Coyroux at Aubazines. The narration of the show is extracted from the Life of Etienne d'Obazine text from the 12th century, written by a contemporary of Etienne.

== Philately ==
A Postage stamp with a value of 1.25 francs depicting the Abbey of Aubazines was issued on 18 February 1978.

== See also ==
- Communes of the Corrèze department
