= Jacques Brival =

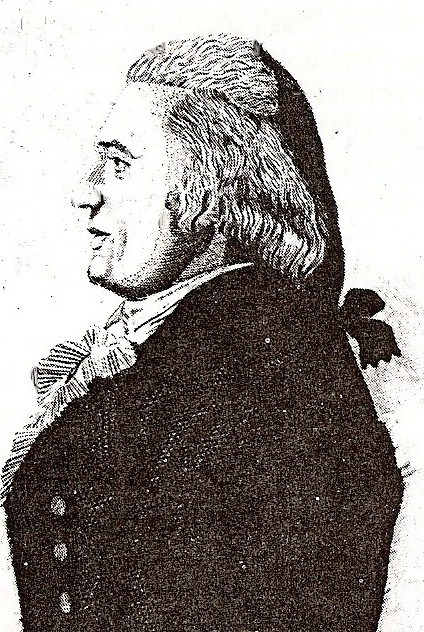
- Portrait of Jacques Brival

Deputy to the Legislative Assembly
- In office 31 August 1791 – 20 September 1792
- Constituency: Corrèze

Deputy to the National Convention
- In office 4 September 1792 – 26 October 1795
- Constituency: Corrèze

Member of the Council of Ancients
- In office 15 October 1795 – 12 April 1798

Member of the Council of Five Hundred
- In office 12 April 1798 – 26 December 1799

Personal details
- Born: 14 February 1751 Saint-Hilaire-Peyroux, Limousin (province), Kingdom of France
- Died: 8 October 1820 (aged 69) Konstanz, Grand Duchy of Baden
- Party: The Mountain
- Occupation: Magistrate, judge, imperial advisor

Jacques Brival (14 February 1751 – 8 October 1820) was a French magistrate, politician, regicide, and Revolutionary deputy. A Jacobin and Montagnard, he held multiple legislative and judicial posts during the French Revolution, the Directory, and the Empire, before dying in exile under the Bourbon Restoration.

== Early life ==
Born in Saint-Hilaire-Peyroux into an affluent family of judicial officers, Brival was the son of Joseph Brival, royal advocate and prosecutor in Tulle. His family possessed the fifth-largest fortune of the local présidial magistracy by 1769. Appointed king’s prosecutor in the bailliage of Tulle in 1776, he married Eulalie-Dieudonné de Burel in 1784, whose dowry stemmed from her father’s service in the Saint-Domingue militia.

By the 1780s, Brival cautiously supported provincial resistance to the crown's reforms, advocating procedural respect for the Parliament of Bordeaux. Though he initially remained distant from radical agitation, he actively supported electoral campaigns for the Estates-General of 1789. In this phase, he revealed himself as a moderate revolutionary with strong local loyalties.

== Revolutionary Engagement ==
In 1790, Brival championed leniency in judicial treatment of rural anti-seigneurial rioters in Favars, opposing his fellow magistrates. This marked his transition toward a more radical stance. Elected procureur général syndic for both the city of Tulle and Corrèze, he joined the local Jacobin Club.

=== Legislative Assembly ===
Elected deputy to the Legislative Assembly in August 1791, Brival sat with the radical left. He corresponded regularly with his constituents, donating part of his salary to Tulle’s poor. He opposed military deployments to the colonies before deliberation by the colonial committee and drew analogies between the slave uprising in Saint-Domingue and the Storming of the Bastille, anticipating a revolutionary alliance between white and Black Jacobins. He denounced refractory priests and proposed melting royal statues for armaments. He coined the phrase “dagger knights” (chevaliers du poignard) for courtiers suspected of royalist conspiracy.

=== National Convention ===
Re-elected to the National Convention in 1792, Brival voted for the execution of Louis XVI without appeal or delay. After the defection of Dumouriez, he demanded a purge of the Committee of General Defense. He opposed the indictment of Jean-Paul Marat and celebrated the proscription of the Girondins after the Insurrection of 31 May – 2 June 1793.

=== Representative on Mission ===
Brival served on missions across Corrèze, Saône-et-Loire, Haute-Vienne, and Vienne from June 1793. Initially aligned with hardline policies, he later moderated, releasing prisoners during Pluviôse Year II. This shift drew hostility from local Jacobins and Montagnards, culminating in his recall in Ventôse. His conflict reflected broader factional rifts between Indulgents and Hébertists.

In Paris, he contributed to early civil code discussions and served briefly as Convention secretary. On 9 Thermidor (27 July 1794), he signed the decree of accusation against Maximilien Robespierre and his allies, boasting of the act that same night—only to be expelled from the Jacobin Club for opportunism.

=== Thermidorian Reaction and Directory ===
Brival participated in purging local administrations in Loiret, Loir-et-Cher, and Indre-et-Loire in mid-1794, but governed with restraint. He closed the Orléans popular society temporarily to allow for reorganization. In January 1795, he declared to the Convention that “after felling the tree, one must uproot its poisonous roots”—referring to remaining members of the House of Bourbon.

He supported the recall of Talleyrand and entered the Council of Ancients in Vendémiaire Year IV (October 1795). In 1797, he endorsed the Coup of 18 Fructidor, advocating deportation of royalist deputies. He joined the Council of Five Hundred in April 1798 but played a minor role. In 1799, he opposed prosecution of the ousted Directors after the Coup of 30 Prairial Year VII.

== Empire and Exile ==
Though appointed judge in Limoges in 1810, Brival had faced prior censure for political views and disreputable conduct. He became imperial court advisor in 1811 and chaired the Bellac electoral college.

Following the Bourbon Restoration, he was dismissed and exiled under the Law against Regicides. He settled in Konstanz and later Aarau, appealing to Minister Élie Decazes in 1818 to return. Suffering mental decline, he died in Konstanz in 1820.

== Personal Life and Wealth ==
A Freemason since the Ancien Régime, Brival was affiliated with the lodge L’Amitié in Limoges. By the Convention’s own reckoning, he declared a personal fortune of 200,000 livres. He held multiple estates in Corrèze and acquired several biens nationaux, including the Carmes convent, which he later sold to the département.

== Family ==
Brival’s uncle, Jean-Joseph Brival, was constitutional Bishop of Tulle (1791–1793), a former Jesuit. Through his half-brother, he was also related to Louise du Plantadis, daughter of Lieutenant-General Étienne du Plantadis.

== Bibliography ==
- "Jacques Brival", in Adolphe Robert and Gaston Cougny, Dictionnaire des parlementaires français (1789–1891), Bourloton, Paris, 1889 Edition details Wikisource * Jean-Philippe Giboury, Dictionnaire des régicides, 1793, Paris, Perrin, 1989.
- Augustin Kuscinski, Dictionnaire des Conventionnels, Paris, 1916.
- Edna Hindie Le May (ed.), Dictionnaire des Législateurs (1791–1792), Paris, 2007.
- Johannès Plantadis, Les conventionnels Brival et Lanot, Bulletin de la Société des Lettres de la Corrèze, 1912–1919.
