= Brabançon =

Historically, the adjective Brabançon refers to a native of the Duchy of Brabant. It can also refer to:

- Brabançons, a group of mercenaries active in Europe between 1166 and 1214
- Brabançon horse, see Belgian Draught
- Petit Brabançon, a type of toy dog
- La Brabançonne, the national anthem of Belgium
