= Stephen of Obazine =

French Roman Catholic saint

Saint Stephen of Obazine
- Born: 1085; Limousin, France
- Died: 8 March 1159; Obazine, France
- Venerated in: Roman Catholic Church
- Canonized: 1701 by Pope Clement XI
- Feast: 8 March

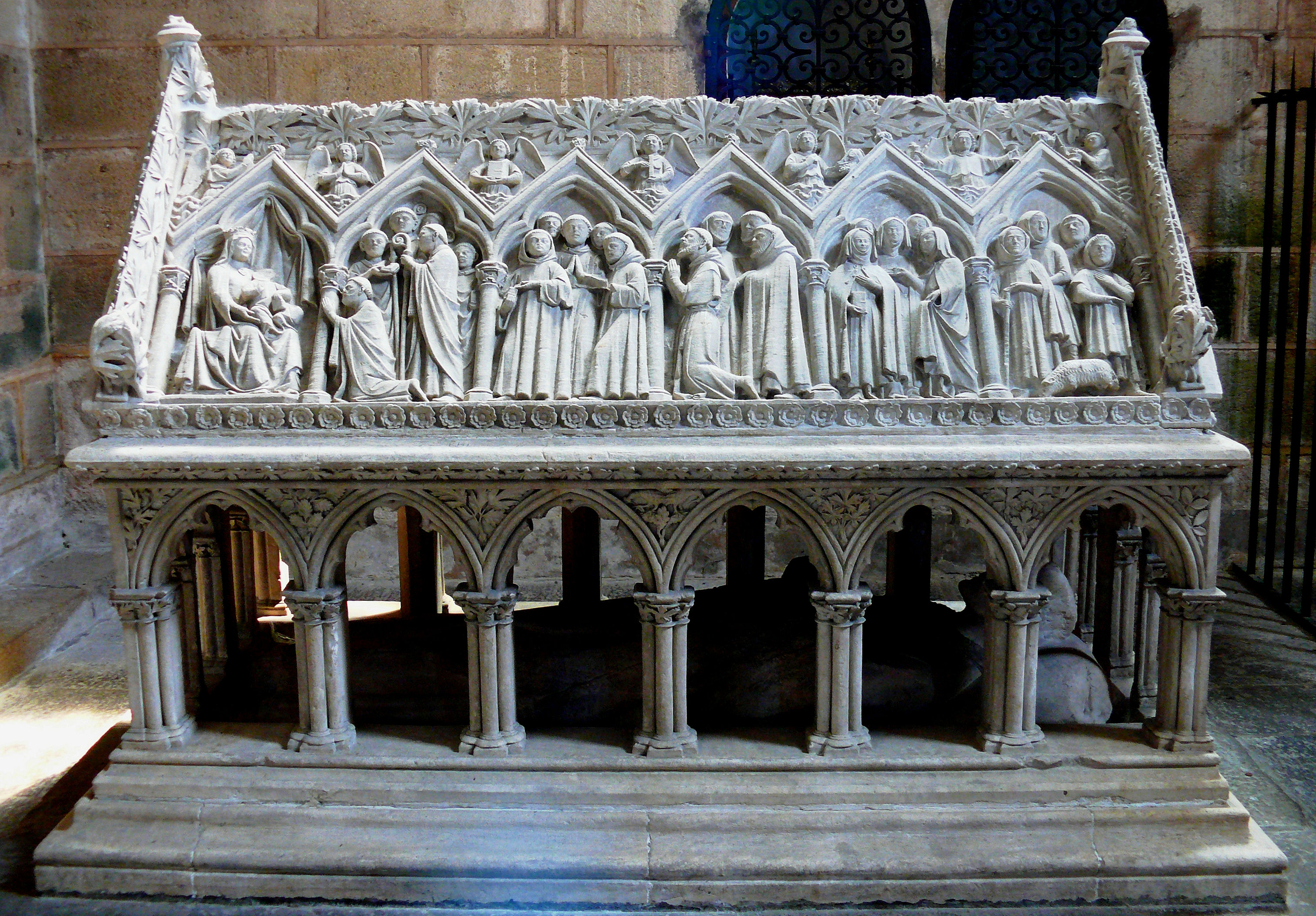
Aubazine Abbey - Tomb of Saint Stephen

Stephen of Obazine also known as Stephen of Vielzot (French: Étienne de Vielzot, Étienne d'Obazine; (1085 – 1159), was a French priest and hermit, famed for his pious nature, even from a young age. He is commemorated on 8 March.

== Religious life ==
Stephen was born in Vielzot, a village in Bassignac-le-Haut. According to local tradition, famine was great in the country, the poor went from one door to another. Young Stephen, who was from a fairly good home, suffered to see so much misery outside. One day, when he was left alone, he emptied the bread bin completely in alms, and when the family returned, they were furious, but the future monk smiled calmly as he took them back to the bin and showed them more dough than had been distributed.

He began his religious life in a community of clerics at Pleaux, where he became a priest and gained the reputation of holiness, especially when it came to the recitation of the divine office, only interrupting these if something of grave necessity arose. He was also known for his love for all things to do with the Mass, ensuring the provision of sacred vessels, furnishings and vestments that were perfect for God. Wanting a more austere life, Stephen and a like-minded priest, by the name of Peter, set out at the beginning of Lent one year to locate a place where they could live as hermits.

On Good Friday they discovered a forest in the region of Obazine. The two priests remained there fasting until Easter Sunday, after which they found a nearby church to celebrate Mass. There is a well-known story of this time: heading back to their hermitage, the two friends paused to rest on the mountain, exhausted and weak from hunger. A peasant woman offered them half a loaf of bread to eat and a vessel of milk to drink. Stephen would later say that this simple meal was the most delightful he had ever tasted.

== Founding of Obazine Abbey ==
In 1134, Eustorge de Scorailles, the Bishop of Limoges, approved the establishment of the hermitage as a monastery on a site granted them by the Viscount Archambault. It was known from then on as Obazine Abbey, even though at the time it comprised mainly many small huts in the forest. Nearby at Coyroux they founded a nunnery for 150 nuns along similar lines. In 1142 Stephen assumed the role of abbot. He affiliated his house with the Cistercians in 1147. While on visitation to a daughterhouse, Bonnaigue, he became seriously ill and died there.

The monastery flourished until it was suppressed during the French Revolution, and its property was seized in 1791. The abbey church survives, and serves as a parish church.

== Studies ==
- Gert Melville, "Stephan von Obazine: Begründung und Überwindung charismatischer Führung," in Giancarlo Andenna / Mirko Breitenstein / Gert Melville (eds.), Charisma und religiöse Gemeinschaften im Mittelalter. Akten des 3. Internationalen Kongresses des "Italienisch-deutschen Zentrums für Vergleichende Ordensgeschichte" (Münster / Hamburg / Berlin / London: LIT 2005) (Vita regularis. Ordnungen und Deutungen religiosen Lebens im Mittelalter, 26), 85–101.
