= Aubazine–Saint-Hilaire station =

Railway station in Saint-Hilaire-Peyroux, France

Coordinates: 45°10′54″N 1°38′30″E

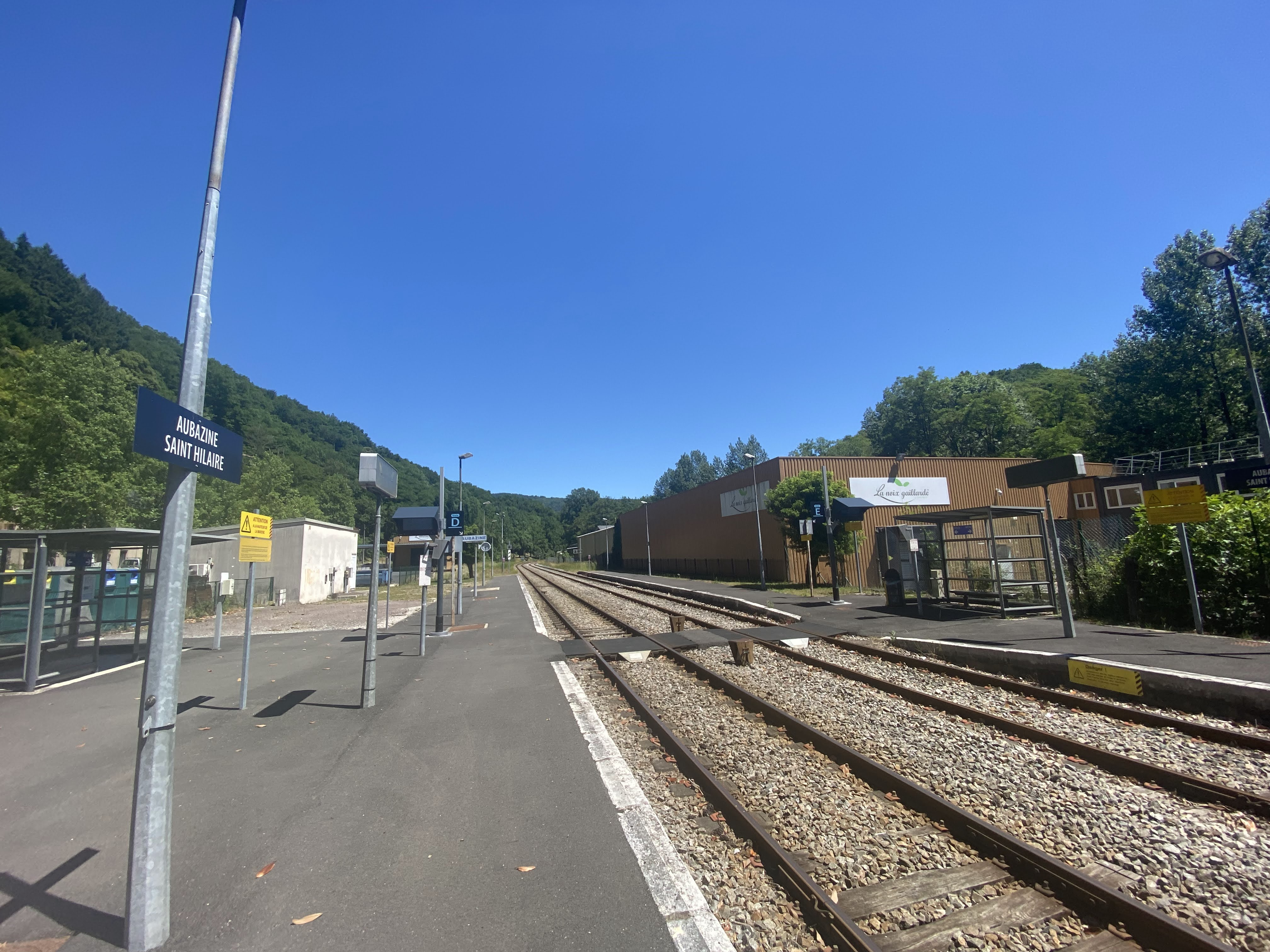

Aubazine-Saint-Hilaire is a railway station near Aubazine and Saint-Hilaire-Peyroux, Nouvelle-Aquitaine, France. The station is located on the Coutras–Tulle railway line. The station is served by TER (local) services operated by the SNCF.

Between 1913 and 1932 it was also a station on the Corrèze Tramway on the line to Turenne and Beaulieu-sur-Dordogne.

== Train services ==
The station is served by regional trains towards Bordeaux, Brive-la-Gaillarde and Ussel.

Preceding station	TER Nouvelle-Aquitaine	Following station
Brive-la-Gaillarde Terminus	27	Cornil towards Ussel
Brive-la-Gaillarde towards Bordeaux	32	Cornil towards Ussel
