= Battle of Malemort =

12th century French and English battle

Coordinates: 45.1667°N 1.55°E

The Battle of Malemort occurred on 21 April 1177 between the mercenary forces of Richard the Lionheart and the citizens of Malemort-sur-Corrèze in the Limousin. The Brabançon mercenaries under William of Cambrai were defeated and William killed, while the forces under Lobar the Wolf and the Viscount of Turenne led an assault on the town of Segur and sacked it.
