= Brabançons =

Medieval mercenary soldiers

The Brabançons or Brabanters (Latin: Brabantiones) were routiers (Note: The term roten, meaning bands or detachments, was first used by the Annales Pegavienses in connection with the campaign of 1179. "The bands were highly organized, and were sharply differentiated by leadership and possibly also origin.") (mercenary troops) originally from the Duchy of Brabant active between 1166 and 1214.

== Origins ==
Brabant was a part of the Holy Roman Empire. The social origins of the Brabançons are uncertain. Some were the younger sons of the knightly class who had received formal military training. Others were drawn from the lower classes and had little or no such training. There were some women in their ranks. They mostly fought as infantry, possessing few horses. They were feared because of their ruthlessness, but probably had less of a tactical impact than the routiers of the later Middle Ages. Despite their name, the Brabançons came to be drawn from all across northern Europe. Walter Map in his De nugis curialium written about 1180 described the origins of the Brabançons thus:

A new and particularly noxious sect of heretics arose. The fighters of these rotten were protected from head to foot by a leather jerkin, and were armed with steel, staves and iron. They went about in bands of thousands and reduced monasteries, villages and cities to ashes. With violence, yet thinking it no sin, they committed adultery, saying "There is no God". This movement arose in Brabant, hence the name Brabançons. From the start these marauders drew up for themselves a curious law, which properly speaking was based on no concept of right. Fugitive rebels, false clerks, renegade monks and all who had forsaken God for any reason joined them.

Groups of Brabançons are mentioned for the first time in a letter of 1166 from the abbot of Cluny, Stephen, to the king of France, Louis VII. They may have been unemployed mercenaries left over after the end in 1160 of the twenty-year war over Grimbergen between Count Godfrey III of Louvain and Walter II Berthout. The devastation of the land and the famine of 1162 may have left many men in search of employment. Renegade priests and monks often joined them, serving as chaplains, although they were regarded as heretics by the church.

== History ==
Under the command of William of Cambrai, Brabançons took part in the Emperor Frederick I's campaign in Italy in 1167. Their first recorded battle is the battle of Tusculum on 29 May 1167. It was apparently these Brabançons who passed through Burgundy on their way to join the imperial army, so alarming the abbot of Cluny with their lack of discipline. The abbot gave their number as 400. The number in Frederick's army is variously given as 500 (Chronica regia Coloniensis), 800 (Otto of Sankt Blasien) or 1,500 (Vincent of Prague). The Annals of Magdeburg says that there were some from Flanders as well as Brabant. They fought so well in their first engagement that they were given all of the booty, the knights being satisfied with the victory alone. On their march home, they so devastated the county of Champagne and the archdiocese of Reims that Frederick I and Louis VII signed an agreement banning the use of Brabançons and coterelli (Note: The term coterelli, from Old French cote (coat), was a general one for mercenaries.) in the area bounded by the Alps, the Rhine and the Paris Basin. This agreement was designed to keep the mercenaries out of France while leaving Frederick free to use them in Germany east of the Rhine or in Italy. Frederick I brought them into Italy a second time in 1175.

King Henry II of England recruited Brabançons to crush the revolt of 1173–74. Roger of Howden estimated their strength at 20,000. Because he trusted them more than the other troops, according to Howden, Henry sent the Brabançons to relieve Louis VII's siege of Verneuil (fr) and occupy Brittany. In 1174, he brought them to England before returning with them to relieve Louis VII's siege of Rouen. The reputation of the Brabançons had been enough to prevent a Flemish invasion of England and force Louis VII to retreat from Verneuil.

Count William VI of Angoulême brought them to the Poitou in 1177. They were defeated by the Poitevin knights at Barbezieux. The Count Richard of Poitou (the future Richard I of England) led a counterattack and captured William VI. The Brabançons, however, continued to ravage the countryside. They were defeated in the battle of Malemort on 21 April 1177 by a locally-raised army, including the militia of Malemort. William of Cambrai and over 2,000 Brabançon men and women were killed. The presence of William suggests that many of these mercenaries were veterans of the Tusculan campaign a decade earlier. William was succeeded as leader by Lobar the Wolf, in fact a Provençal.

In 1173, Henry II had also raised mercenaries in southern France. In the winter of 1176–1177, Basque appeared in Aquitaine and thereafter the number of foreign mercenaries grew. Godfrey of Breuil recorded the foreigners as Brabançons, Hannuyers, Asperes, Pailler, Navar, Turlannales, Roma, Cotarel, Catalans, Aragones. The Third Lateran Council of 1179 forbade Christians the use Brabantiones, Aragonenses, Navarii, Bascoli, Coterelli and Triaverdini, referring to these same bands of mercenaries. They stood accused of disrespecting churches, killing women, children, the elderly, and waging war for the sake of loot. The bands were excommunicated. Nevertheless, their use continued. Before the end of 1179, they were used in Germany for the first and only time by Archbishop Philip of Cologne against Duke Henry of Saxony.

Henry the Young King employed Brabançons against his father, Henry II, in 1183. When he died suddenly in June, the mercenaries began ravaging Aquitaine. Under Lobar's successor, another Provençal named Mercadier (died 1200), they were soon employed by Richard of Poitou. By this time the Brabançon companies were recruited from all over western Europe. The last recorded use of the Brabançons was by the English at the battle of Bouvines in 1214. These men were probably from Brabant and the Low Countries. They were under the command of Reginald of Boulogne, and were the last troops to break on the allied side. There were 400–700 mercenaries after the battle and probably not much more to start.

== Fighting style ==
Although some occasionally fought on horseback, the Brabançon companies were overwhelmingly infantry. They are described as such during Henry II's campaign in 1173, the archbishop of Cologne's campaign in 1179 and the battle of Bouvines in 1214. Likewise, Walter Map's description of their arms and armour (leather jerkin) corresponds to those of infantry. At Bouvines, the Brabançons arrayed in a circle two ranks deep with their pikes in the ground.

== Bibliography ==
- Boffa, Sergio (2017). "Les mercenaires appelés « Brabançons » aux ordres de Renaud de Dammartin et leur tactique défensive à la bataille de Bouvines (1214)". Revue du Nord (419): 7–24.
- Cheyette, Fredric L. (2001). Ermengard of Narbonne and the World of the Troubadours. Cornell University Press.
- DeVries, Kelly (2008). "Medieval Mercenaries: Methodology, Definitions, and Problems". In John France (ed.). Mercenaries and Paid Men: The Mercenary Identity in the Middle Ages. Brill. pp. 43–60.
- Freed, John (2016). Frederick Barbarossa: The Prince and the Myth. Yale University Press.
- Janin, Hunt; Carlson, Ursula (2013). Mercenaries in Medieval and Renaissance Europe. McFarland.
- Knödler, Julia (2010). "Brabançons". In Clifford J. Rogers (ed.). The Oxford Encyclopedia of Medieval Warfare and Military Technology. Vol. 1. Oxford University Press. p. 168.
- Stubbs, William, ed. (1868). Chronica magistri Roderi de Houedene. Vol. 2. Longman.
- Verbruggen, J. F. (1997). The Art of Warfare in Western Europe During the Middle Ages: From the Eighth Century to 1340 (2nd rev. ed.). Boydell Press.
