= Malemort-Lafont station =

Railway station in France

Coordinates: 45°10′54″N 1°38′30″E

Malemort-Lafont is a former railway station in Malemort-sur-Corrèze, Limousin, France. The station was located on the Coutras–Tulle railway line, between Brive-la-Gaillarde and Tulle.
