= Malemort =

- Commune
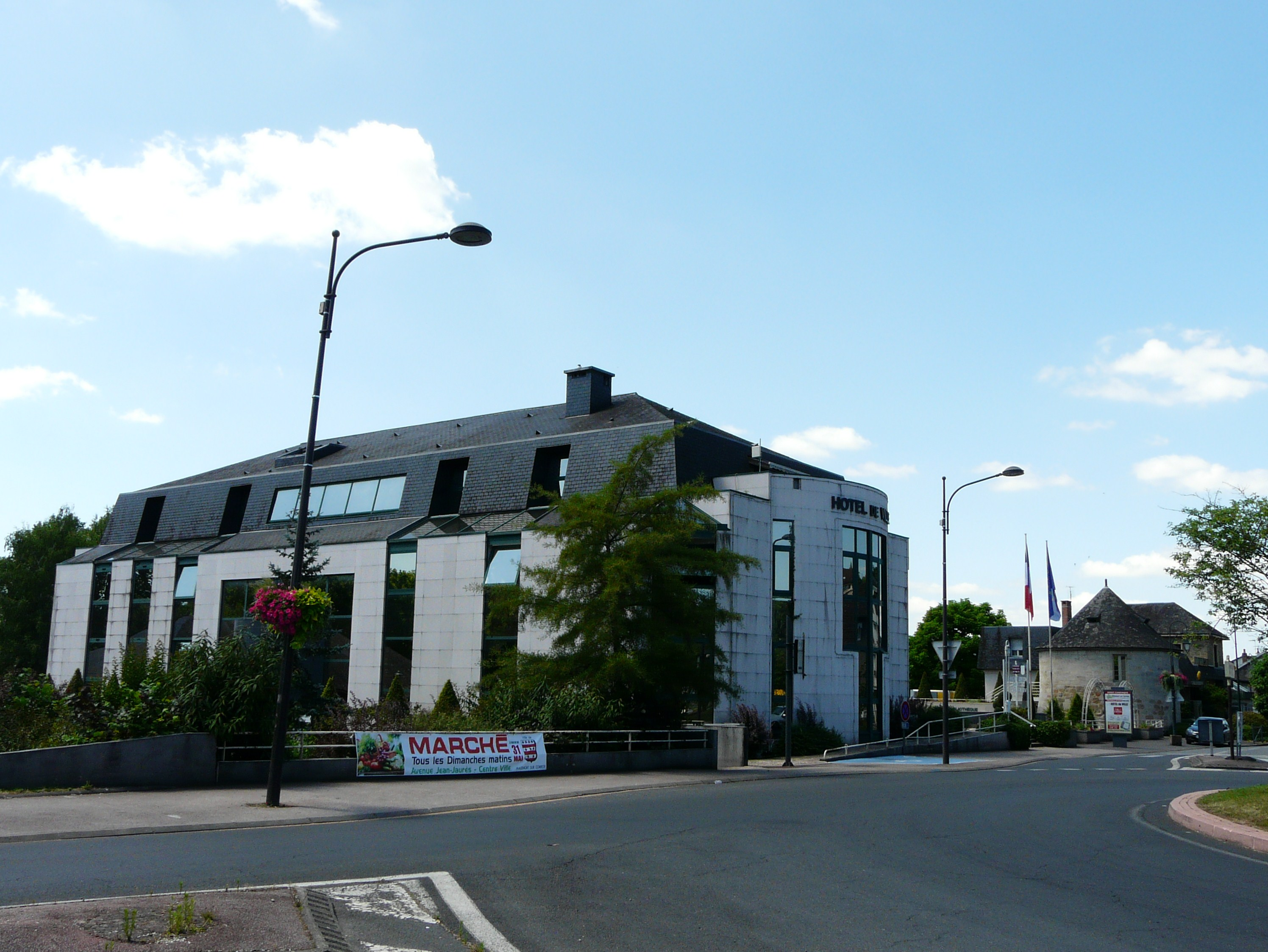
- The town hall in Malemort-sur-Corrèze
- Location of Malemort
- Location within France Location within Nouvelle-Aquitaine
- Coordinates: 45°10′16″N 1°33′54″E
- Country: France
- Region: Nouvelle-Aquitaine
- Department: Corrèze
- Arrondissement: Brive-la-Gaillarde
- Canton: Malemort
- Intercommunality: CA Bassin de Brive

Government
  - Mayor (2020–2026): Laurent Darthou
- Area^{1}: 19.65 km^{2} (7.59 sq mi)
- Population (2023): 8,239
  - Density: 419.3/km^{2} (1,086/sq mi)
- Time zone: UTC+01:00 (CET)
  - Summer (DST): UTC+02:00 (CEST)
- INSEE/Postal code: 19123 /19360
- ^{1} French Land Register data, which excludes lakes, ponds, glaciers > 1 km^{2} (0.386 sq mi or 247 acres) and river estuaries.

Malemort (French pronunciation: [malmɔʁ]; Occitan: Mala Mòrt) is a commune in the Corrèze department of southern France. The municipality was established on 1 January 2016 and consists of the former communes of Malemort-sur-Corrèze and Venarsal.

== Population ==
Population data refer to the commune in its geography as of January 2025.

Historical population
Year	Pop.	±% p.a.
1968	3,265	—
1975	4,891	+5.94%
1982	6,285	+3.65%
1990	6,828	+1.04%
1999	6,904	+0.12%
2007	7,602	+1.21%
2012	8,097	+1.27%
2017	7,985	−0.28%
2023	8,239	+0.52%
Source: INSEE

== See also ==
- Communes of the Corrèze department
