= Venarsal =

- Part of Malemort
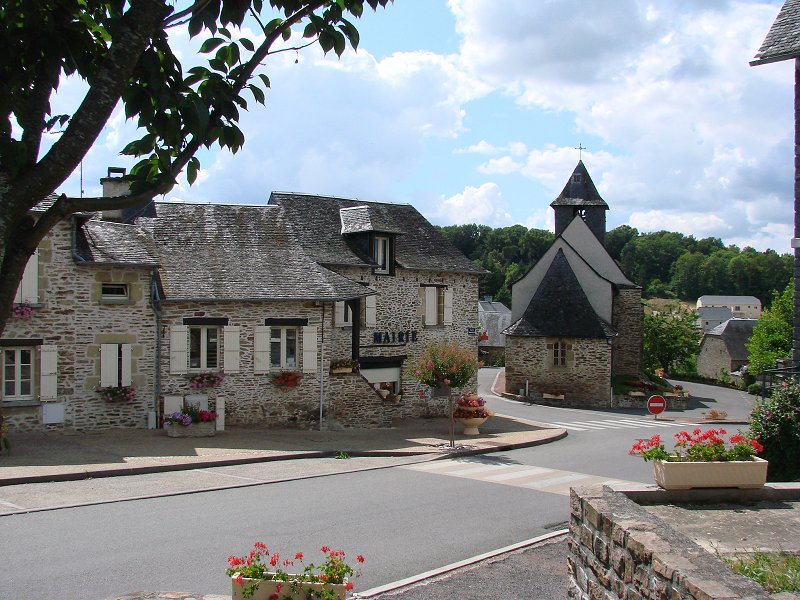
- The church and surrounding buildings in Venarsal

- Coat of arms
- Location of Venarsal
- Location within France Location within Nouvelle-Aquitaine
- Coordinates: 45°11′48″N 1°37′24″E
- Country: France
- Region: Nouvelle-Aquitaine
- Department: Corrèze
- Arrondissement: Brive-la-Gaillarde
- Canton: Malemort-sur-Corrèze
- Commune: Malemort
- Area^{1}: 3.14 km^{2} (1.21 sq mi)
- Highest elevation: 389 m (1,276 ft)
- Lowest elevation: 192 m (630 ft)
- Population (2023): 501
  - Density: 160/km^{2} (413/sq mi)
- Time zone: UTC+01:00 (CET)
  - Summer (DST): UTC+02:00 (CEST)
- Postal code: 19360
- ^{1} French Land Register data, which excludes lakes, ponds, glaciers > 1 km^{2} (0.386 sq mi or 247 acres) and river estuaries.

Venarsal (French pronunciation: [vənaʁsal]) is a former commune in the Corrèze department in central France. On 1 January 2016, it was merged into the new commune Malemort.

== See also ==
- Communes of the Corrèze department
