= Cornil station =

Railway station in Cornil, France

Coordinates: 45°12′54″N 1°41′50″E

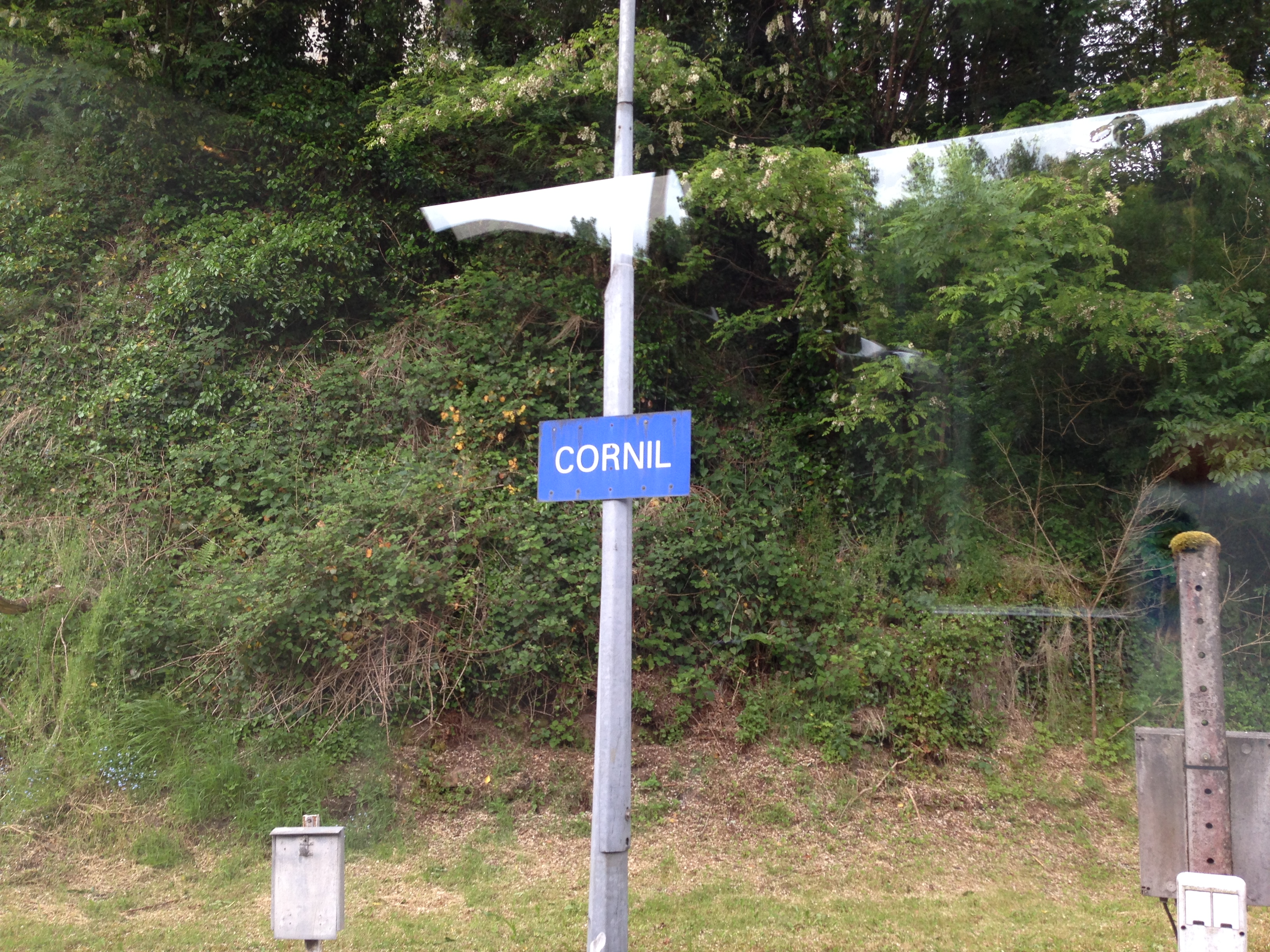
Cornil station sign

Cornil is a railway station in Cornil, Nouvelle-Aquitaine, France. The station is located on the Coutras–Tulle railway line. The station is served by TER (local) services operated by the SNCF.

== Train services ==
The station is served by regional trains towards Bordeaux, Brive-la-Gaillarde and Ussel.

Preceding station	TER Nouvelle-Aquitaine	Following station
Aubazine-Saint-Hilaire towards Brive-la-Gaillarde	27	Tulle towards Ussel
Aubazine-Saint-Hilaire towards Bordeaux	32	Tulle towards Ussel
