= Cornil =

- Commune
- Coat of arms
- Location of Cornil
- Location within France Location within Nouvelle-Aquitaine
- Coordinates: 45°12′40″N 1°41′36″E
- Country: France
- Region: Nouvelle-Aquitaine
- Department: Corrèze
- Arrondissement: Tulle
- Canton: Sainte-Fortunade
- Intercommunality: CA Tulle Agglo

Government
  - Mayor (2020–2026): Pascal Fouché
- Area^{1}: 19.66 km^{2} (7.59 sq mi)
- Elevation: 250 m (820 ft)
- Highest elevation: 490 m (1,610 ft)
- Lowest elevation: 140 m (460 ft)
- Population (2023): 1,261
  - Density: 64.14/km^{2} (166.1/sq mi)
- Time zone: UTC+01:00 (CET)
  - Summer (DST): UTC+02:00 (CEST)
- INSEE/Postal code: 19061 /19150
- ^{1} French Land Register data, which excludes lakes, ponds, glaciers > 1 km^{2} (0.386 sq mi or 247 acres) and river estuaries.

Cornil (French pronunciation: [kɔʁnil]; Occitan: Cornilh) is a commune in Corrèze, a department in central France. It has a train station, Cornil station.

== Population ==
Historical population
Year	Pop.	±% p.a.
1968	1,564	—
1975	1,532	−0.29%
1982	1,515	−0.16%
1990	1,423	−0.78%
1999	1,363	−0.48%
2007	1,393	+0.27%
2012	1,401	+0.11%
2017	1,340	−0.89%
2023	1,261	−1.01%
Source: INSEE

== See also ==
- Communes of the Corrèze department
