= Saint-Hilaire-Peyroux =

- Commune
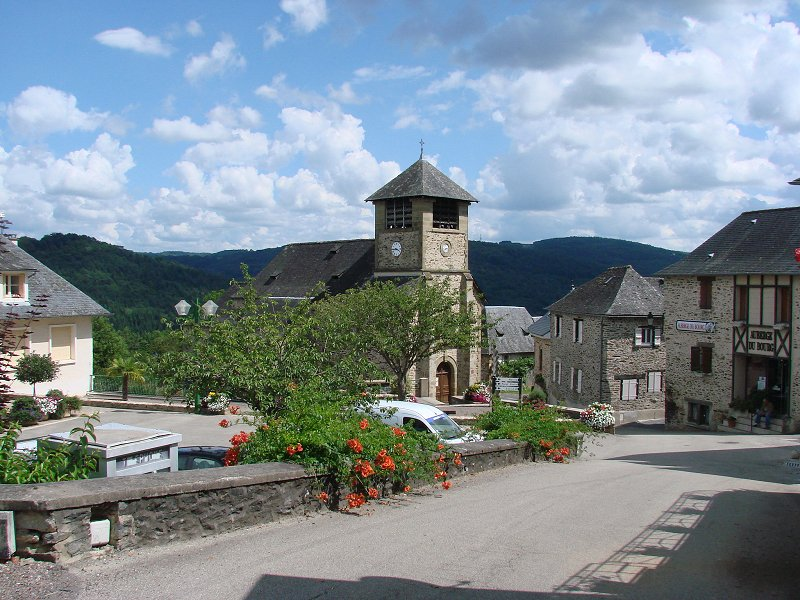
- The church and surrounding buildings in Saint-Hilaire-Peyroux

- Coat of arms
- Location of Saint-Hilaire-Peyroux
- Location within France Location within Nouvelle-Aquitaine
- Coordinates: 45°12′54″N 1°38′58″E
- Country: France
- Region: Nouvelle-Aquitaine
- Department: Corrèze
- Arrondissement: Tulle
- Canton: Naves
- Intercommunality: CA Tulle Agglo

Government
  - Mayor (2021–2026): Agnès Bourg
- Area^{1}: 18.89 km^{2} (7.29 sq mi)
- Highest elevation: 447 m (1,467 ft)
- Lowest elevation: 120 m (390 ft)
- Population (2023): 974
  - Density: 51.6/km^{2} (134/sq mi)
- Time zone: UTC+01:00 (CET)
  - Summer (DST): UTC+02:00 (CEST)
- INSEE/Postal code: 19211 /19560
- ^{1} French Land Register data, which excludes lakes, ponds, glaciers > 1 km^{2} (0.386 sq mi or 247 acres) and river estuaries.

Saint-Hilaire-Peyroux (French pronunciation: [sɛ̃t‿ilɛʁ pɛʁu]; Occitan: Sent Alari Peiros) is a commune in the Corrèze department in central France. Aubazine-Saint-Hilaire station has rail connections to Brive-la-Gaillarde, Ussel, Tulle, and Bordeaux.

== Population ==
Historical population
Year	Pop.	±% p.a.
1968	1,011	—
1975	854	−2.38%
1982	787	−1.16%
1990	807	+0.31%
1999	790	−0.24%
2007	887	+1.46%
2012	938	+1.12%
2017	978	+0.84%
2023	974	−0.07%
Source: INSEE

== See also ==
- Communes of the Corrèze department
