= Malemort-sur-Corrèze =

- Part of Malemort
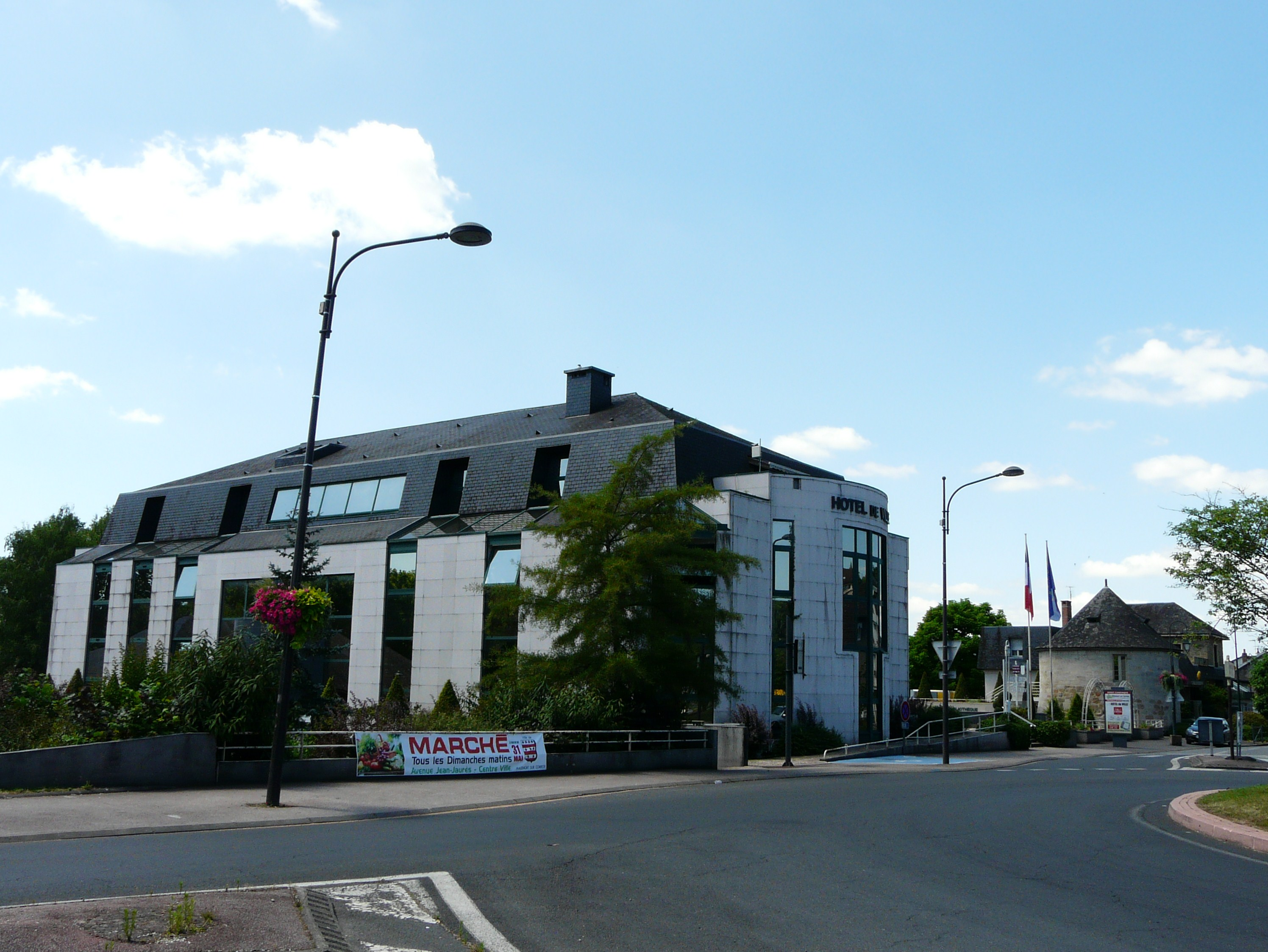
- Town hall

- Coat of arms
- Location of Malemort-sur-Corrèze
- Location within France Location within Nouvelle-Aquitaine
- Coordinates: 45°10′18″N 1°33′53″E
- Country: France
- Region: Nouvelle-Aquitaine
- Department: Corrèze
- Arrondissement: Brive-la-Gaillarde
- Canton: Malemort-sur-Corrèze
- Commune: Malemort
- Area^{1}: 16.51 km^{2} (6.37 sq mi)
- Elevation: 88 m (289 ft)
- Highest elevation: 320 m (1,050 ft)
- Lowest elevation: 107 m (351 ft)
- Population (2022): 7,504
  - Density: 454.5/km^{2} (1,177/sq mi)
- Time zone: UTC+01:00 (CET)
  - Summer (DST): UTC+02:00 (CEST)
- Postal code: 19360
- ^{1} French Land Register data, which excludes lakes, ponds, glaciers > 1 km^{2} (0.386 sq mi or 247 acres) and river estuaries.

Malemort-sur-Corrèze (French pronunciation: [malmɔʁ syʁ kɔʁɛz]; Limousin: Malamòrt) is a former commune in the Corrèze department in central France. On 1 January 2016, it was merged into the new commune Malemort.

The Battle of Malemort was fought there on 21 April 1177.

== Population ==
Historical population

Year	Pop.	±% p.a.
1793	756	—
1800	928	+2.97%
1806	902	−0.47%
1821	1,029	+0.88%
1831	1,068	+0.37%
1836	1,179	+2.00%
1841	1,157	−0.38%
1846	1,248	+1.53%
1851	1,248	+0.00%
1856	1,225	−0.37%
1861	1,201	−0.39%
1866	1,270	+1.12%
1872	1,228	−0.56%
1876	1,175	−1.10%
1881	1,155	−0.34%
1886	1,212	+0.97%
1891	1,201	−0.18%
1896	1,166	−0.59%

Year	Pop.	±% p.a.
1901	1,195	+0.49%
1906	1,190	−0.08%
1911	1,217	+0.45%
1921	1,099	−1.01%
1926	1,117	+0.33%
1931	1,099	−0.32%
1936	1,120	+0.38%
1946	1,255	+1.14%
1954	1,518	+2.41%
1962	2,354	+5.64%
1968	3,062	+4.48%
1975	4,706	+6.33%
1982	6,020	+3.58%
1990	6,484	+0.93%
1999	6,535	+0.09%
2006	7,019	+1.03%
2022	7,504	+0.42%

Source: EHESS and INSEE

== See also ==
- Communes of the Corrèze department
- Malemort-Lafont station, a former railway station
