= Bar, Corrèze =

Bar
- Commune
- Coat of arms
- Location of Bar
- Location within France Location within Nouvelle-Aquitaine
- Coordinates: 45°20′46″N 1°48′55″E
- Country: France
- Region: Nouvelle-Aquitaine
- Department: Corrèze
- Arrondissement: Tulle
- Canton: Naves
- Intercommunality: CA Tulle Agglo

Government
  - Mayor (2020–2026): Jean-Jacques Bossoutrot
- Area^{1}: 20.82 km^{2} (8.04 sq mi)
- Highest elevation: 562 m (1,844 ft)
- Lowest elevation: 238 m (781 ft)
- Population (2023): 311
  - Density: 14.9/km^{2} (38.7/sq mi)
- Time zone: UTC+01:00 (CET)
  - Summer (DST): UTC+02:00 (CEST)
- INSEE/Postal code: 19016 /19800
- ^{1} French Land Register data, which excludes lakes, ponds, glaciers > 1 km^{2} (0.386 sq mi or 247 acres) and river estuaries.

Bar (French pronunciation: [baʁ]) is a commune in the Corrèze department in the Nouvelle-Aquitaine region of central France.

== Geography ==
Bar is located some 40 km north-east of Brive-la-Gaillarde and 8 km north of Tulle. Access to the commune is by the D53 road which branches from the D1120 west of the commune and passes through the narrow neck of the commune before continuing north as the D32 to Orliac-de-Bar. The D53 also continues south from the village through the heart of the commune to Gimel-les-Cascades. The D23 comes from Tulle in the south and passes through the commune and the village continuing north-east to join the D26 near Corrèze. The D173 comes from Le Lonzac in the north down the western arm of the commune and passes south to join the D53 in the commune. Apart from the village there are the hamlets of Cousin Haut and Cousin Bas in the western arm of the commune. The commune is mixed forest and farmland with forests predominant.

The Corrèze river flows from the north-east of the commune forming part of the north-eastern border then continuing west then south through the commune to form part of the southern border before continuing south-west to eventually join the Vézère west of Brive-la-Gaillarde. The Vimbelle river forms the eastern border of the western arm of the commune flowing south to also form the south-western border of the commune before it joins the Corrèze on the southern border of the commune. The Menaude river flows from the north through the commune to join the Vimbelle on the western border. The Ruisseau du Passadour forms the western border of the eastern arm of the commune as it flows south to join the Menaude.

=== Heraldry ===
| Arms of Bar | The official status of the blazon remains to be determined. Blazon: Argent, three fesses Gules. |

== Administration ==
List of Successive Mayors

| From | To | Name |
|---|---|---|
| 1983 | 2008 | Pierre Cheze |
| 2008 | 2014 | Daniel Geneste |
| 2014 | 2026 | Jean-Jacques Bossoutrot |

== Demography ==
The inhabitants of the commune are known as Barois or Baroises in French.

Historical population

| Year | Pop. | ±% p.a. |
|---|---|---|
| 1793 | 1,346 | — |
| 1800 | 1,050 | −3.49% |
| 1806 | 1,044 | −0.10% |
| 1821 | 1,128 | +0.52% |
| 1831 | 1,228 | +0.85% |
| 1836 | 1,208 | −0.33% |
| 1841 | 1,170 | −0.64% |
| 1846 | 1,088 | −1.44% |
| 1851 | 1,073 | −0.28% |
| 1856 | 1,091 | +0.33% |
| 1861 | 1,005 | −1.63% |
| 1866 | 1,023 | +0.36% |
| 1872 | 1,020 | −0.05% |
| 1876 | 985 | −0.87% |
| 1881 | 1,000 | +0.30% |
| 1886 | 1,020 | +0.40% |
| 1891 | 1,066 | +0.89% |
| 1896 | 1,044 | −0.42% |
| 1901 | 1,059 | +0.29% |

| Year | Pop. | ±% p.a. |
|---|---|---|
| 1906 | 1,015 | −0.85% |
| 1911 | 981 | −0.68% |
| 1921 | 896 | −0.90% |
| 1926 | 797 | −2.31% |
| 1931 | 742 | −1.42% |
| 1936 | 692 | −1.39% |
| 1946 | 570 | −1.92% |
| 1954 | 543 | −0.60% |
| 1962 | 443 | −2.51% |
| 1968 | 397 | −1.81% |
| 1975 | 330 | −2.61% |
| 1982 | 282 | −2.22% |
| 1990 | 317 | +1.47% |
| 1999 | 315 | −0.07% |
| 2007 | 322 | +0.28% |
| 2012 | 316 | −0.38% |
| 2017 | 308 | −0.51% |
| 2023 | 311 | +0.16% |

Source: EHESS and INSEE

== Sites and monuments ==
- The Chapel de Lacour contains a Statuette of the Virgin and child (16th century) which is registered as an historical object.
- 2 Capitals and a fragment of Column in the Place de l'Eglise (11th century) are registered as an historical object.
- A Keystone in the Place de l'Eglise (15th century) is registered as an historical object.

== See also ==
- Communes of the Corrèze department
