= Corrèze, Corrèze =

Corrèze
- Commune
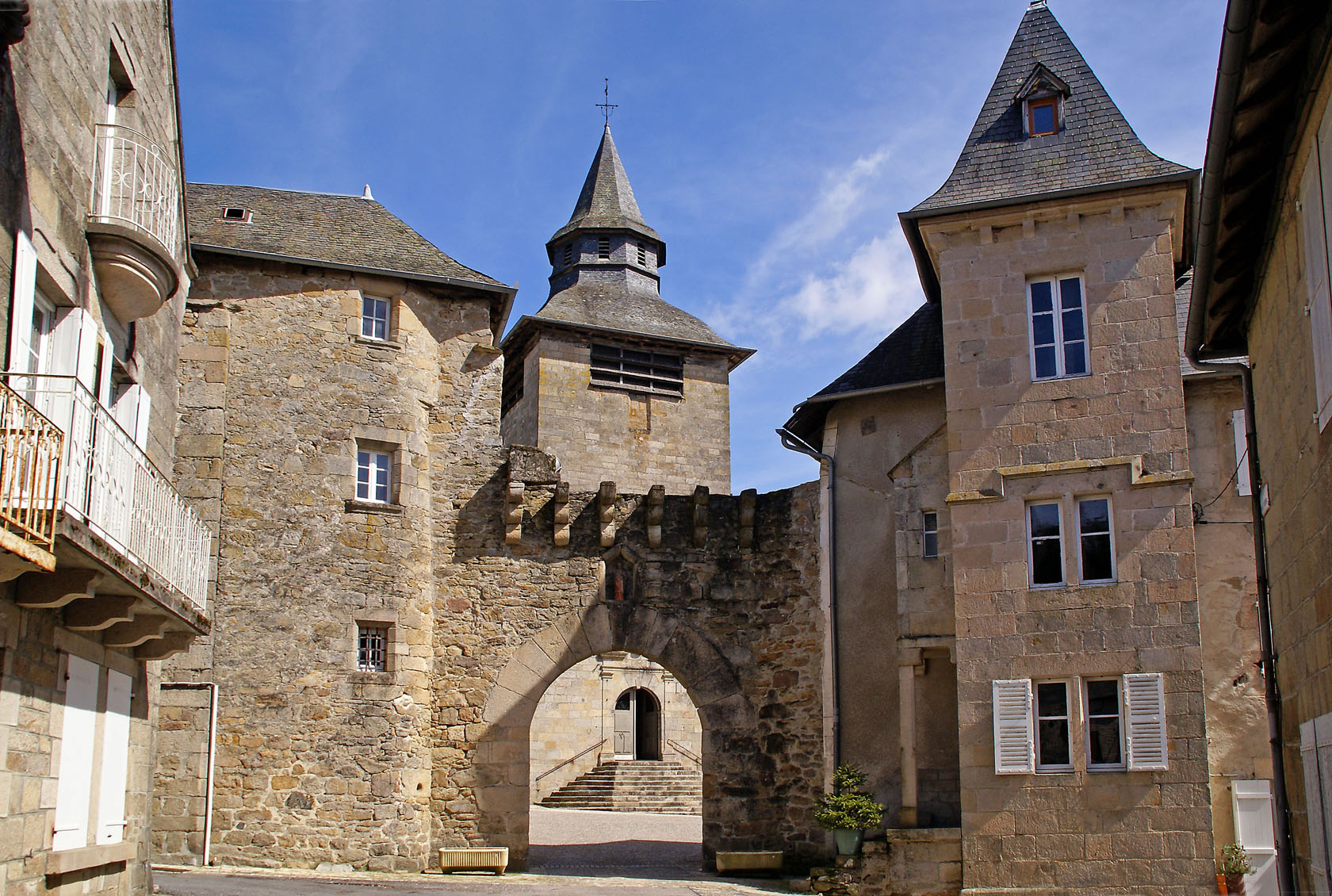
- Port Margot, Corrèze's mediaeval gateway to the old part of the village

- Coat of arms
- Location of Corrèze
- Location within France Location within Nouvelle-Aquitaine
- Coordinates: 45°22′24″N 1°52′33″E
- Country: France
- Region: Nouvelle-Aquitaine
- Department: Corrèze
- Arrondissement: Tulle
- Canton: Naves
- Intercommunality: CA Tulle Agglo

Government
  - Mayor (2026–32): Jean-François Labbat
- Area^{1}: 34.16 km^{2} (13.19 sq mi)
- Highest elevation: 644 m (2,113 ft)
- Lowest elevation: 295 m (968 ft)
- Population (2023): 1,171
  - Density: 34.28/km^{2} (88.78/sq mi)
- Time zone: UTC+01:00 (CET)
  - Summer (DST): UTC+02:00 (CEST)
- INSEE/Postal code: 19062 /19800
- ^{1} French Land Register data, which excludes lakes, ponds, glaciers > 1 km^{2} (0.386 sq mi or 247 acres) and river estuaries.

Corrèze (French pronunciation: [kɔʁɛz]; Occitan: Corrèsa) is a commune in the central French department of Corrèze.

== History ==
The first known mention of Corrèze dates from the ninth century A.D.. Later, it became a stop along the pilgrimage to Saint-Jacques-de-Compostelle, or Santiago de Compostela, and a town formed around the church. It was burnt down by the English during the Hundred Years War, but rebuilt later in the fifteenth century. The 1789 French Revolution did not have any notable effects on the town itself; the First World War, however, claimed over one hundred lives. With the onset of rural exodus and urbanization, the town has never reestablished its former population.

== Geography ==
Corrèze is situated in the Massif Central in south-central France, within the regional nature park of Millevaches en Limousin. It borders on Vitrac-sur-Montane to the northeast, Saint-Priest-de-Gimel to the southeast, Bar to the southwest, and Meyrignac-l'Église to the northwest. A little further to the southwest, about 20 kilometers from Corrèze, lies Tulle, the prefecture of the department. The Corrèze (river) flows through the town, which is where it gets its name.

== Population ==
Historical population
Year	Pop.	±% p.a.
1968	1,576	—
1975	1,528	−0.44%
1982	1,340	−1.86%
1990	1,145	−1.95%
1999	1,152	+0.07%
2007	1,177	+0.27%
2012	1,143	−0.58%
2017	1,128	−0.26%
2023	1,171	+0.63%
Source: INSEE

== Places and monuments ==
A medieval town, a stopover on the road to Santiago de Compostela, Corrèze retains many vestiges of its past.

- La Porte Margot - a city gate in memory of Margaret of Valois, the last trace of the old rampart walk that defended the entrance to the town, opens onto the church square. It dates from the 15th-century and bears a statue of Saint Martial in a niche above the entrance. It was listed as a Historic Monument in 1927.
- L'église Saint-Martial - a church whose origins date back to the Carolingian era. Rebuilt and extended several times, it bears the marks of the Romanesque style of the 12th and 13th-centuries and the later additions of Gothic style, in the 16th-century. In particular, it contains a 17th-century baroque altarpiece made by Jean Tournié de Gourdon. It was listed as a Historic Monument in 1972.
- La Chapelle des Pénitents Blancs - listed as a Historic Monument in 1988, was built between 1730 and 1781. Located next to the cemetery, it is dedicated to Saint John the Baptist and contains an 18th-century carved wooden pulpit which is also listed as a Historic Monument.
- The hamlet of L'Hospital (L'Hospital Couraise), - a former possession of the Knights Hospitaller, a member of the commandery of Carlat until the French Revolution
- Le hameau de L'Hospital (L'Hospital Couraise) - located on the edge of the Corrèze next to an 18th-century stone bridge with two arches, whose origins date back to the 15th-century. It houses a statue of the Virgin in polychrome stone brought back from Spain by a mason from the village who was responsible of its construction. An important place of pilgrimage, it was rebuilt during the 18th and 19th-centuries. It still welcomes pilgrims, from the 5 to 8 September, for the feast of the Nativity of the Virgin.
- Several Renaissance hotels, grouped around the church, such as the Hôtels Florentin (17th-century) and Terriou (1667) hotels.
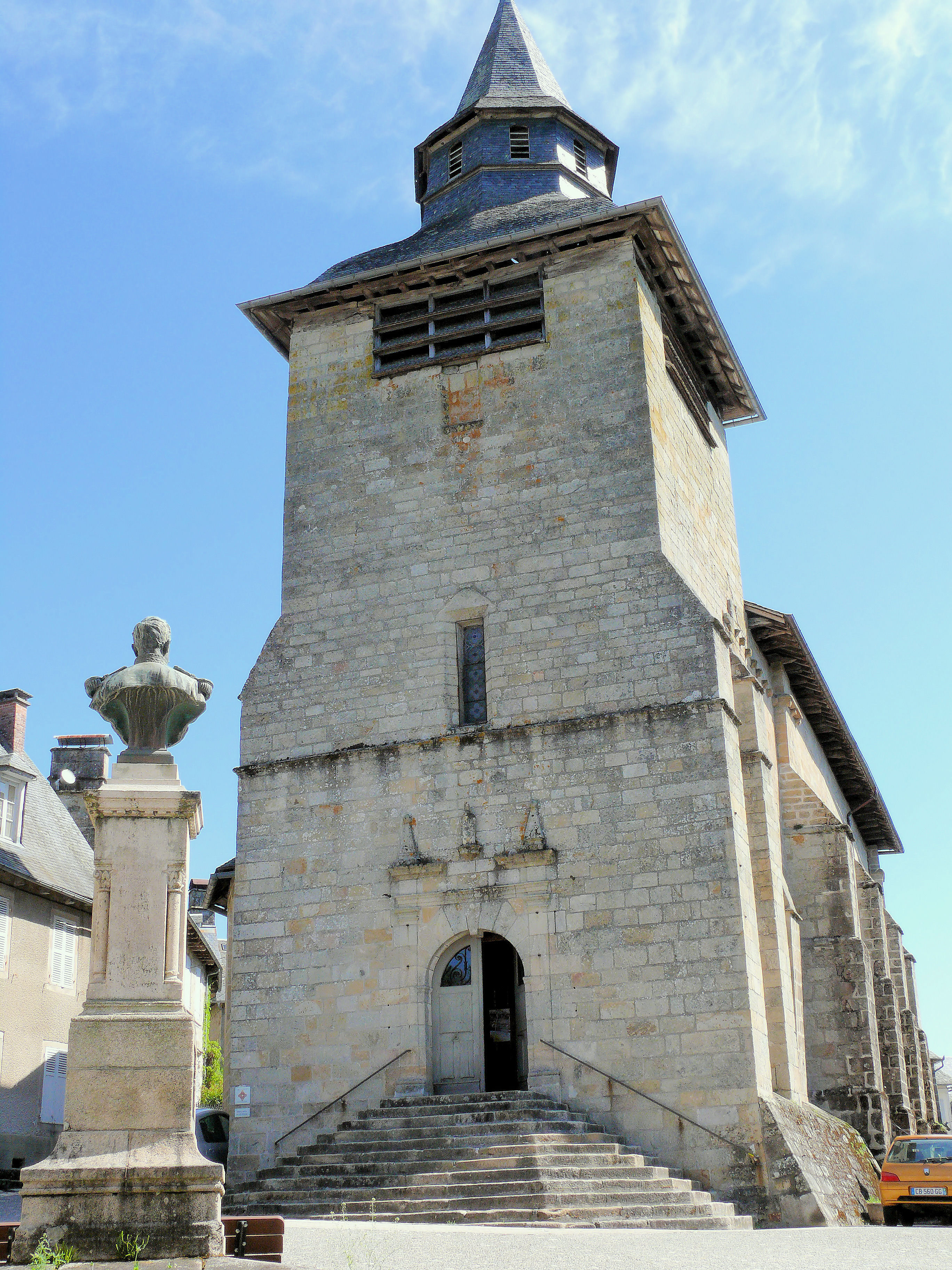
Saint-Martial church and monument to General Tramond.

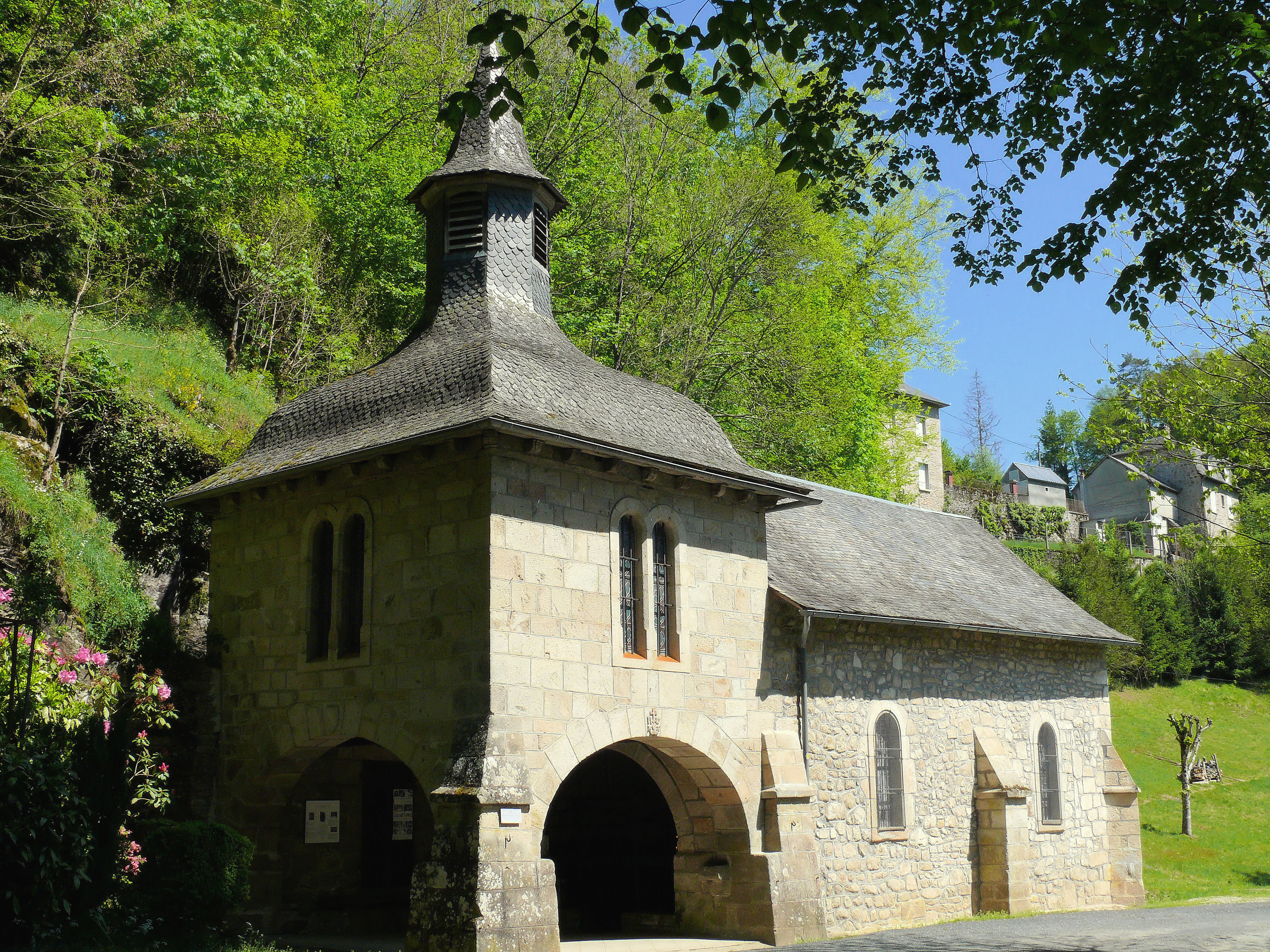
Chapel of Notre-Dame du Pont du Salut.

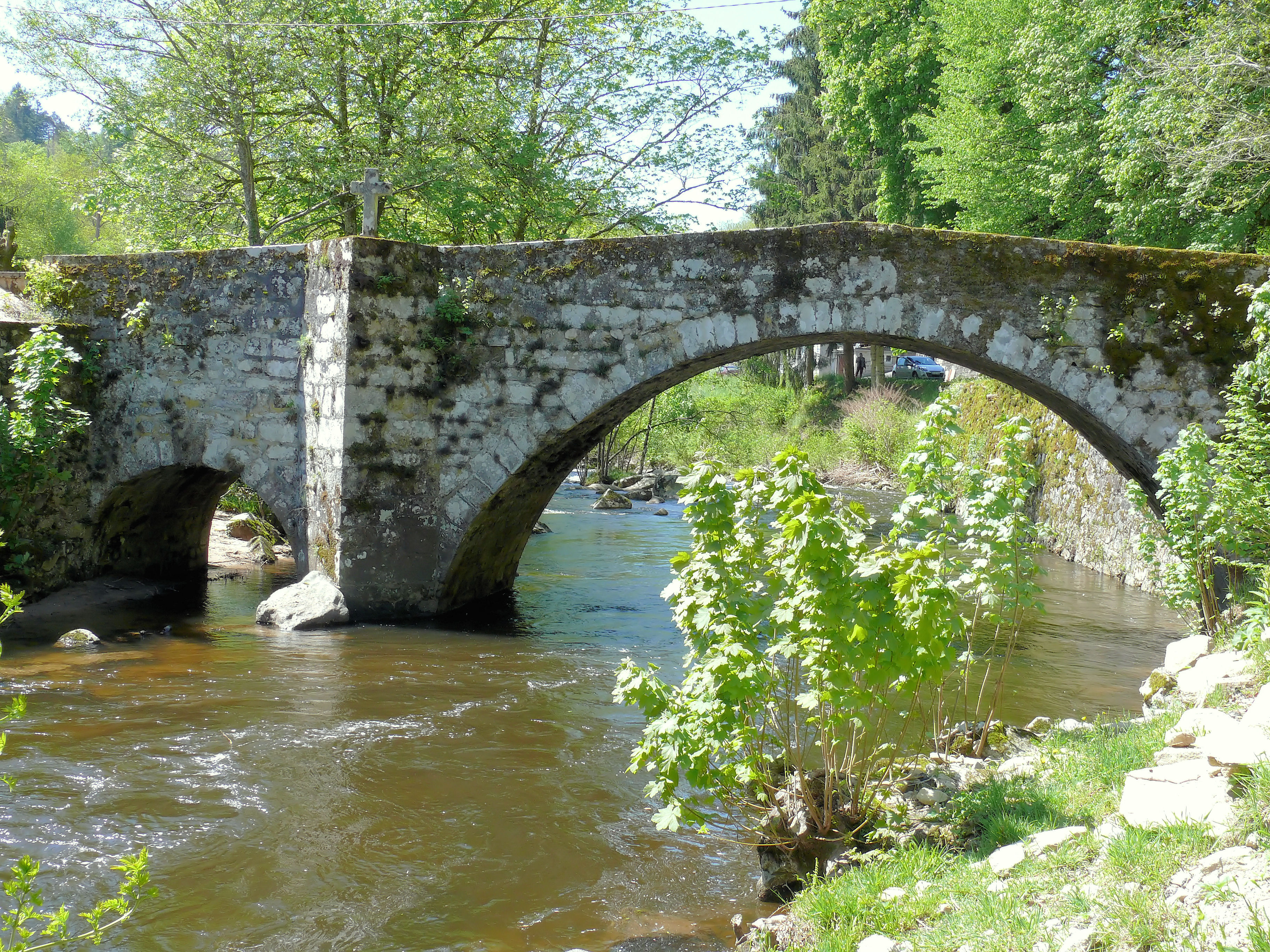
Bridge of the Notre-Dame chapel.

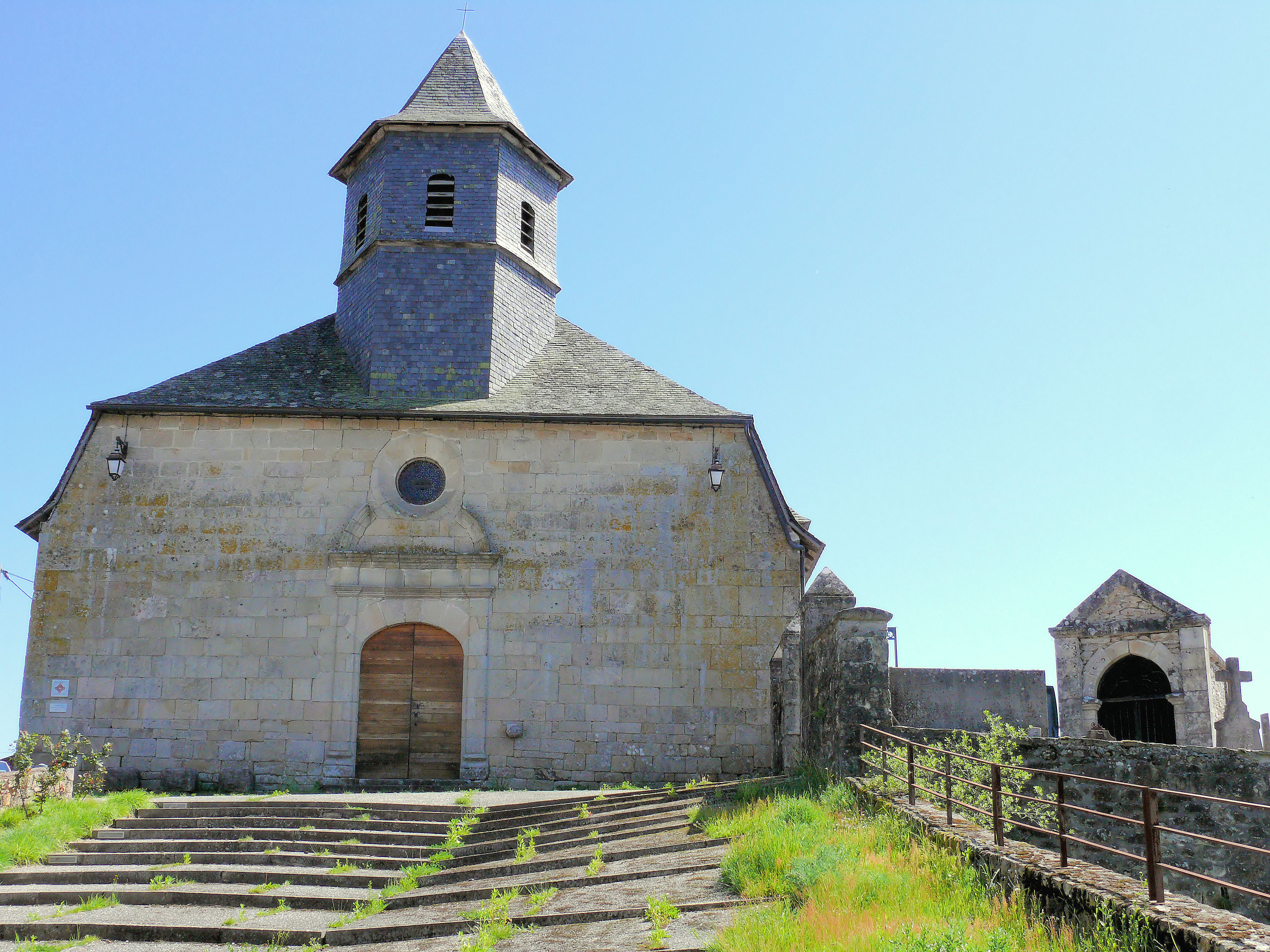
Chapel of the White Penitents.

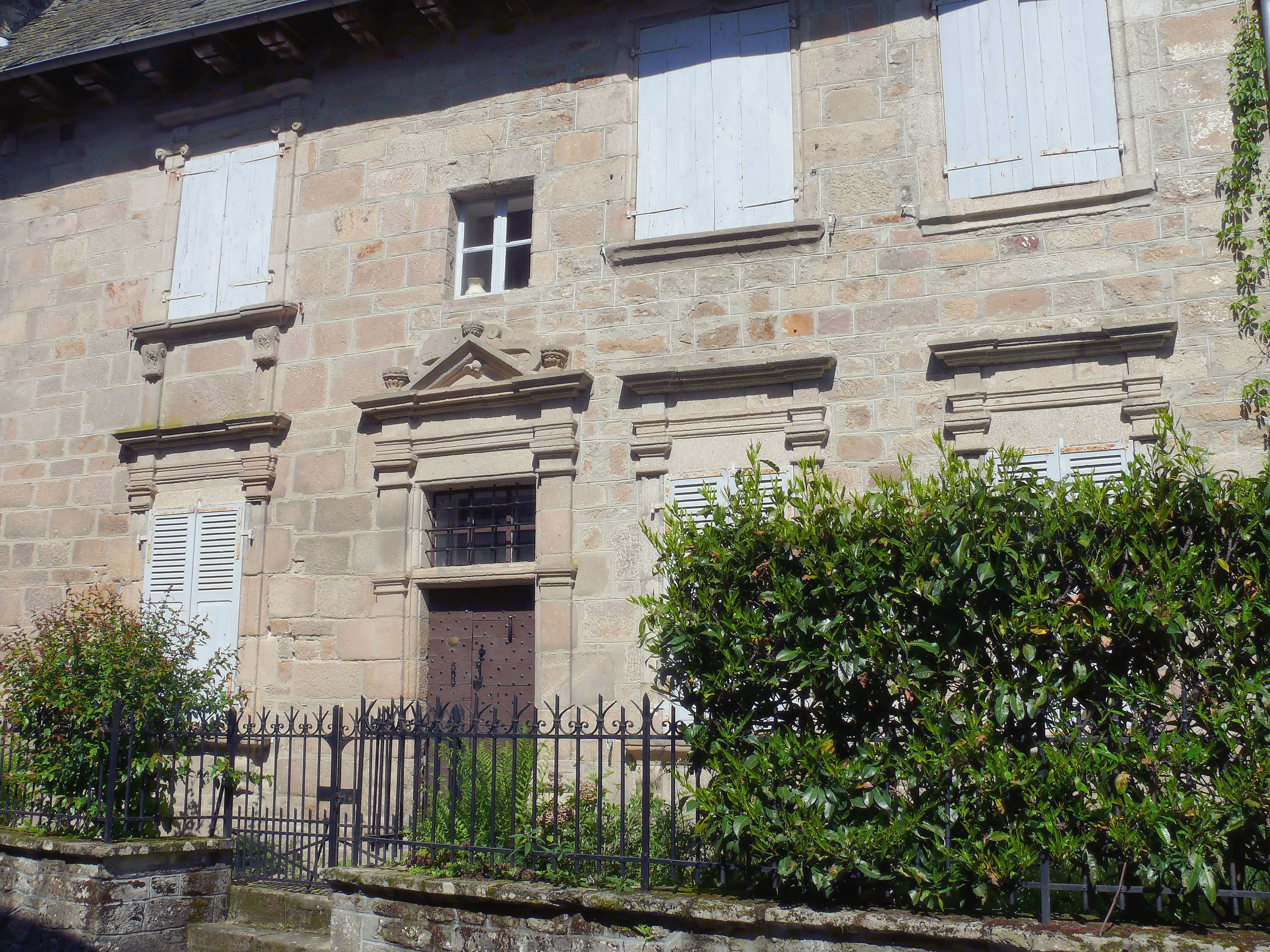
Apothecary's house, north of the church.

== Personalities linked to the commune ==
- Baptiste Tramond (1834–1889), French general
- Bernadette Chirac, general councillor of Corrèze for the canton of Corrèze since 1979.

== See also ==
- Communes of the Corrèze department
