= Tulle =

Tulle may refer to:

- Tulle (netting)
- Tulle, Corrèze
  - Arrondissement of Tulle
  - Canton of Tulle
  - Diocese of Tulle
- Tulle Hazelrigg, American biologist
