= Les Angles-sur-Corrèze =

- Commune
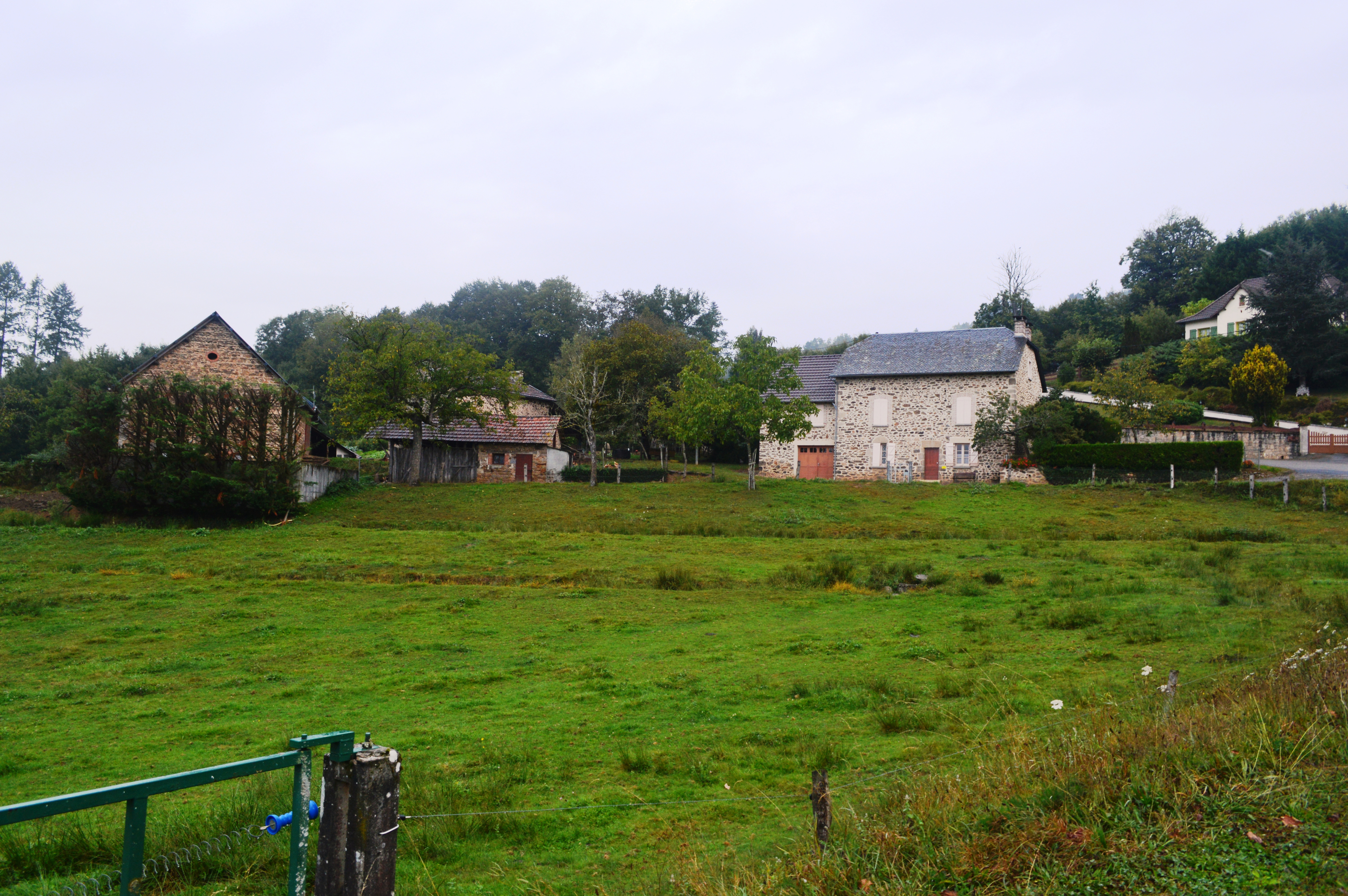
- A general view of Les Angles-sur-Corrèze

- Coat of arms
- Location of Les Angles-sur-Corrèze
- Location within France Location within Nouvelle-Aquitaine
- Coordinates: 45°18′28″N 1°47′51″E
- Country: France
- Region: Nouvelle-Aquitaine
- Department: Corrèze
- Arrondissement: Tulle
- Canton: Naves
- Intercommunality: CA Tulle Agglo

Government
  - Mayor (2020–2026): Christian Dumond
- Area^{1}: 4.73 km^{2} (1.83 sq mi)
- Elevation: 250 m (820 ft)
- Highest elevation: 481 m (1,578 ft)
- Lowest elevation: 224 m (735 ft)
- Population (2023): 125
  - Density: 26.4/km^{2} (68.4/sq mi)
- Time zone: UTC+01:00 (CET)
  - Summer (DST): UTC+02:00 (CEST)
- INSEE/Postal code: 19009 /19000
- ^{1} French Land Register data, which excludes lakes, ponds, glaciers > 1 km^{2} (0.386 sq mi or 247 acres) and river estuaries.

Les Angles-sur-Corrèze (French pronunciation: [le.z‿ɑ̃ɡl syʁ kɔʁɛz]; Occitan: Los Angles) is a commune in the Corrèze department in the Nouvelle-Aquitaine region of central France.

== Geography ==
Les Angles-sur-Corrèze is located some 7 km north-west of Tulle and 30 km south-west of Égletons. It is traversed by the A89 autoroute from west to east through the heart of the commune but there is no exit in the commune. The nearest exits are Exit 20 to the west of the commune and Exit 21 to the east. Access to the commune is by road D58 which branches off the D23 south of the commune and continues north to the village and continues north then east to join the D1089 highway which forms the south-eastern border of the commune. There are large areas of forest in the commune with some areas of farmland near the village. Apart from the village there is the hamlet of Le Massoulier towards the east.

The Corrèze river forms the northern and western borders of the commune as it flows south to join the Vézère west of Brive-la-Gaillarde. Many unnamed streams rise in the commune and flow into the Correze.

== Toponymy ==
The locality appears in charters dated 1404 in the form Anguli. Its name is a reference to the shape of the village of a pointed wedge (like the head of a wood-chopping axe).

== History ==
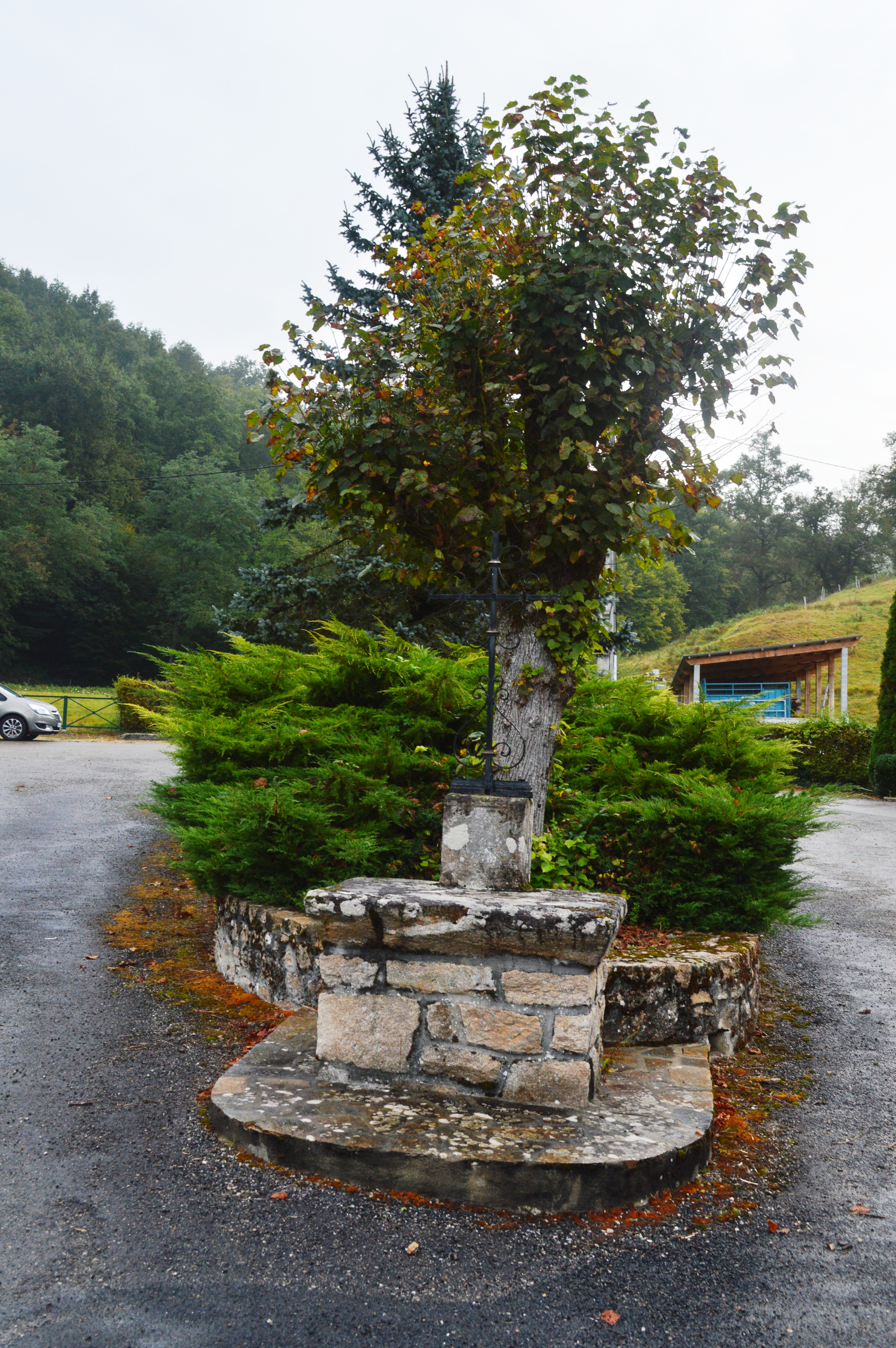
A Wayside Cross in Les Angles-sur-Corrèze

=== Heraldry ===
Arms of Les Angles-sur-Corrèze	Blazon: Azure, an escarbuncle of Or.

== Administration ==
List of Successive Mayors

From	To	Name
2001	2026	Christian Dumond

== Demography ==
Historical population

Year	Pop.	±% p.a.
1793	150	—
1821	170	+0.45%
1846	142	−0.72%
1872	124	−0.52%
1901	127	+0.08%
1926	91	−1.32%
1946	78	−0.77%
1962	72	−0.50%
1968	72	+0.00%

Year	Pop.	±% p.a.
1975	66	−1.24%
1982	94	+5.18%
1990	111	+2.10%
1999	108	−0.30%
2007	102	−0.71%
2012	105	+0.58%
2017	112	+1.30%
2023	125	+1.85%

Source: EHESS and INSEE

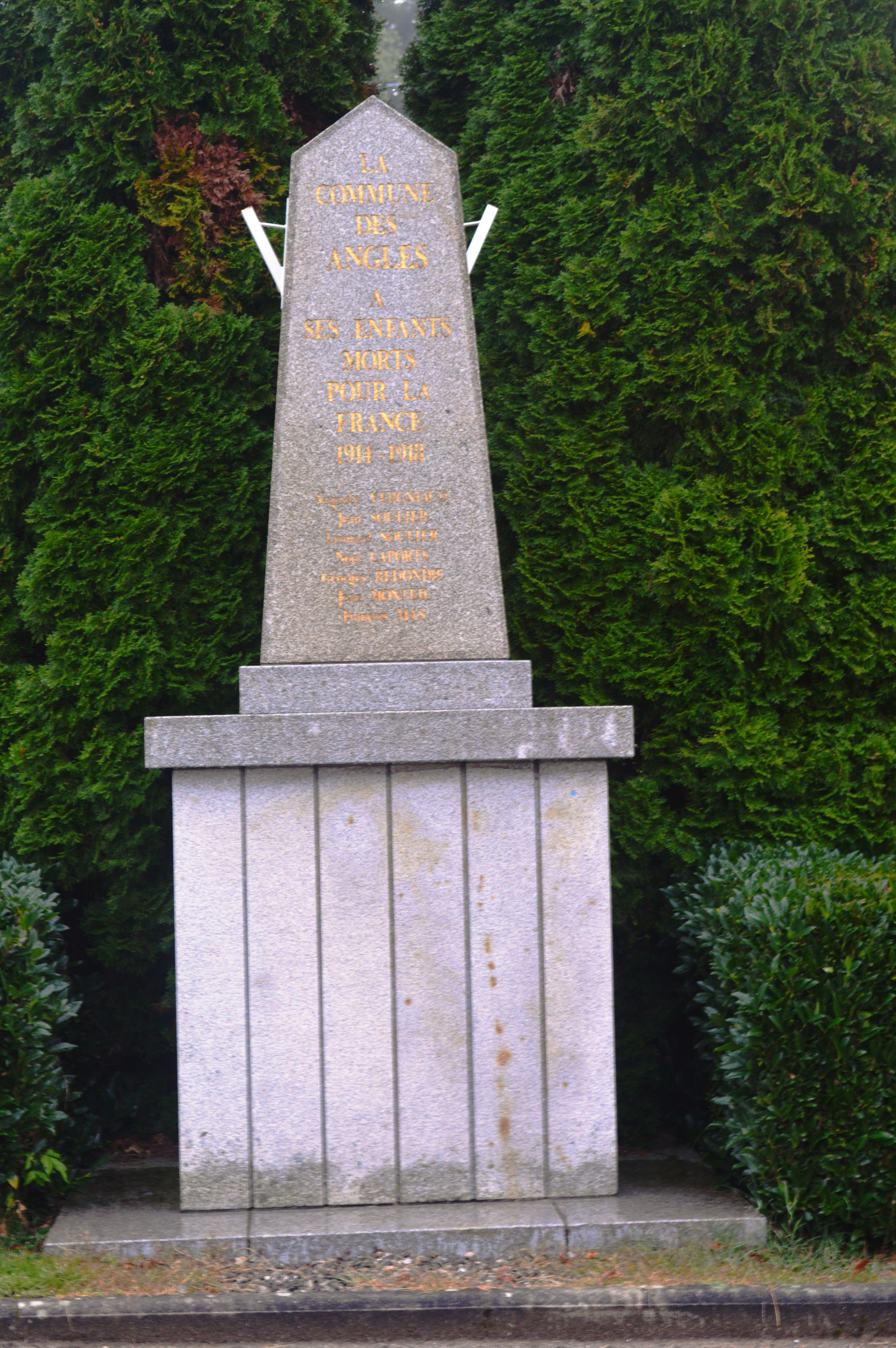
Les Angles-sur-Corrèze War Memorial

== Culture and heritage ==
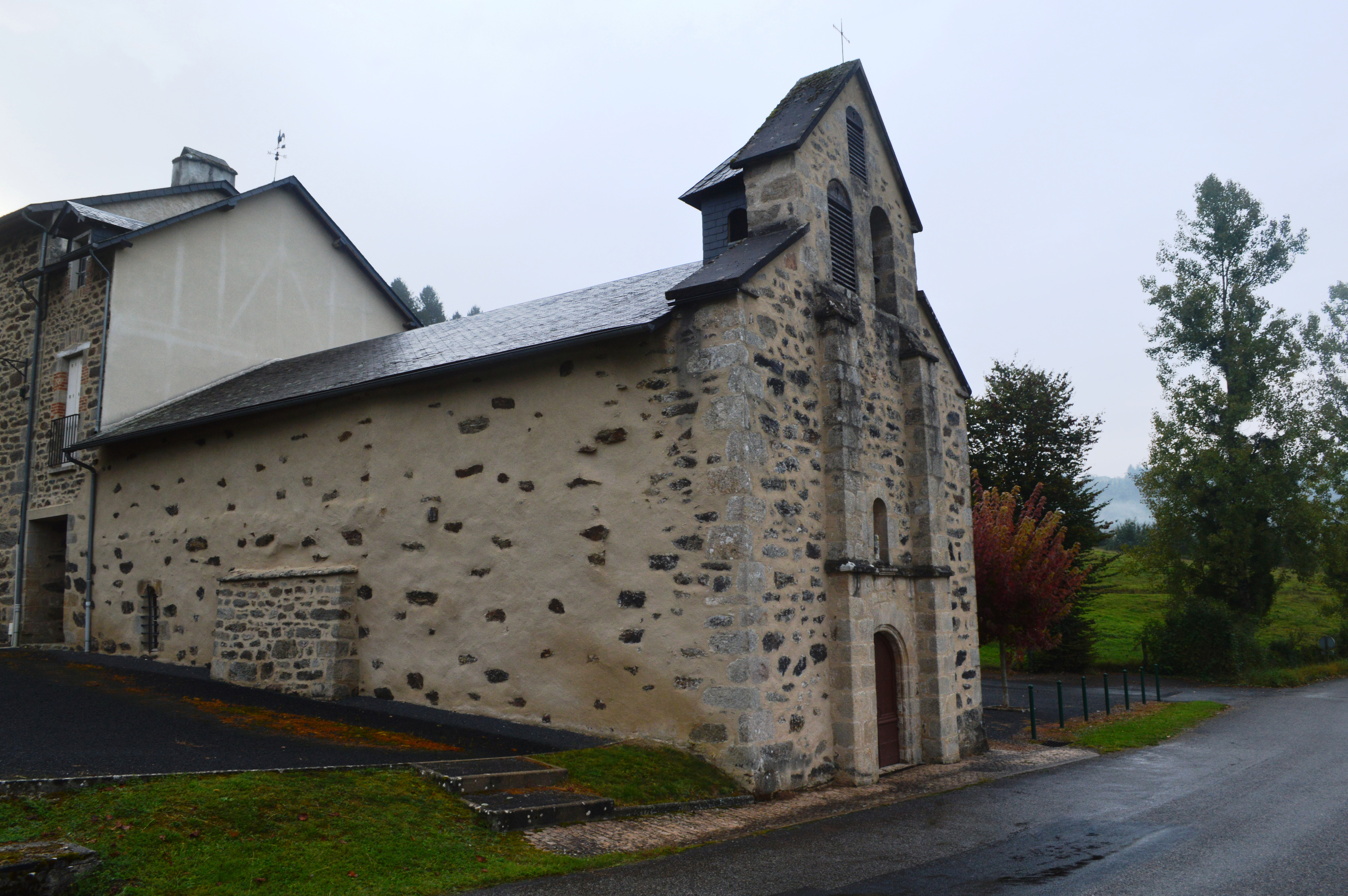
The Church of the Nativity of Notre-Dame

=== Religious heritage ===
The Parish Church of the Nativity of Notre-Dame contains two items that are registered as historical objects:

- A Statue: Saint Apôtre (17th century)
- A Statue: Saint Roch (17th century)

=== Environmental heritage ===
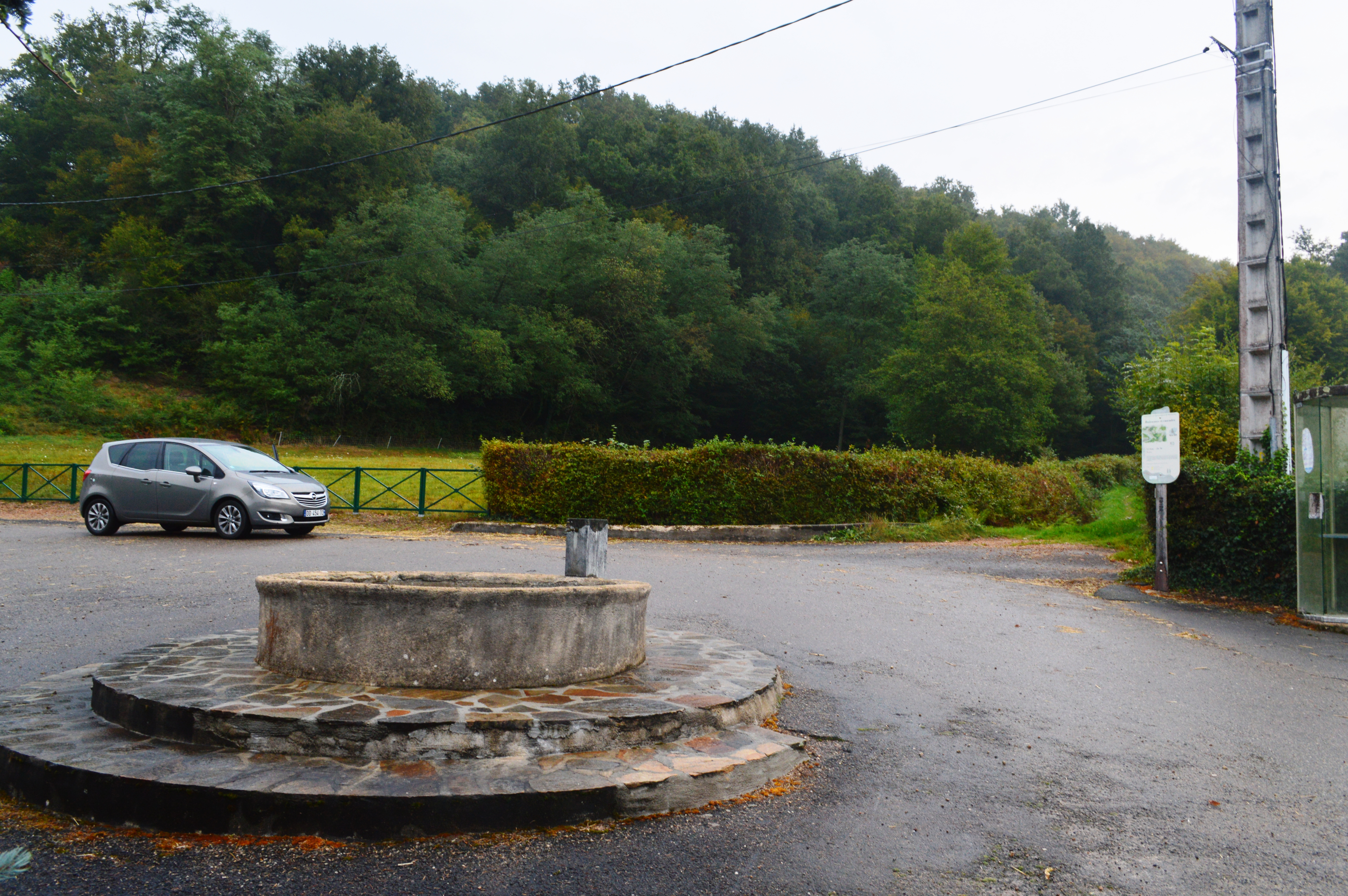
The Village Square

The village square (with a well for animals) has a grouping of buildings of a Church, Town Hall, and School, all in stone. It is a few kilometres on foot from the village to the Corrèze river and to the left a path leads to the Gimel-les-Cascades waterfalls. Again in the village square in front of the well a small path leads over the hills towards the A89 autoroute with beautiful landscapes.

== See also ==
- Communes of the Corrèze department
