= Corrèze (disambiguation) =

Corrèze may refer to:

== Places ==
- Corrèze, a department in the center of France, named after:
- the Corrèze (river)
- Corrèze, Corrèze, a commune of the Corrèze department

== People ==
- Jacques Corrèze

== See also ==
- Korez
