= Canton of Naves =

Coordinates: 45.31°N 1.77°E

The canton of Naves is an administrative division of the Corrèze department, south-central France. It was created at the French canton reorganisation which came into effect in March 2015. Its seat is in Naves.

It consists of the following communes:

1. Les Angles-sur-Corrèze
2. Bar
3. Chameyrat
4. Corrèze
5. Favars
6. Gimel-les-Cascades
7. Meyrignac-l'Église
8. Naves
9. Orliac-de-Bar
10. Saint-Augustin
11. Saint-Germain-les-Vergnes
12. Saint-Hilaire-Peyroux
13. Saint-Mexant
