= Chameyrat =

- Commune
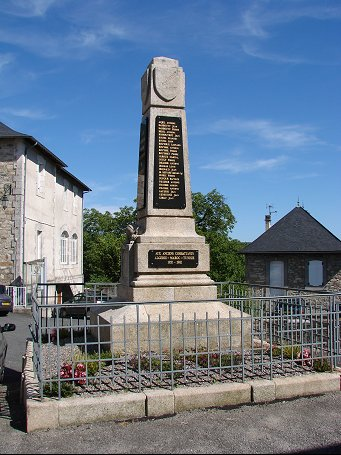
- War memorial

- Coat of arms
- Location of Chameyrat
- Location within France Location within Nouvelle-Aquitaine
- Coordinates: 45°14′06″N 1°41′56″E
- Country: France
- Region: Nouvelle-Aquitaine
- Department: Corrèze
- Arrondissement: Tulle
- Canton: Naves
- Intercommunality: CA Tulle Agglo

Government
  - Mayor (2020–2026): Émilie Boucheteil
- Area^{1}: 18.95 km^{2} (7.32 sq mi)
- Highest elevation: 471 m (1,545 ft)
- Lowest elevation: 160 m (520 ft)
- Population (2023): 1,481
  - Density: 78.15/km^{2} (202.4/sq mi)
- Time zone: UTC+01:00 (CET)
  - Summer (DST): UTC+02:00 (CEST)
- INSEE/Postal code: 19038 /19330
- ^{1} French Land Register data, which excludes lakes, ponds, glaciers > 1 km^{2} (0.386 sq mi or 247 acres) and river estuaries.

Chameyrat (French pronunciation: [ʃameʁa]; Occitan: Chamairac) is a commune in the Corrèze department in central France.

== Population ==
Historical population
Year	Pop.	±% p.a.
1968	1,185	—
1975	1,196	+0.13%
1982	1,436	+2.65%
1990	1,569	+1.11%
1999	1,541	−0.20%
2007	1,584	+0.34%
2012	1,583	−0.01%
2017	1,535	−0.61%
2023	1,481	−0.60%
Source: INSEE

== See also ==
- Communes of the Corrèze department
