= Tulle Cathedral =

Cathedral in Nouvelle-Aquitaine, France

Coordinates: 45°16′4″N 1°46′17″E

Tulle Cathedral Cathédrale Notre-Dame de Tulle
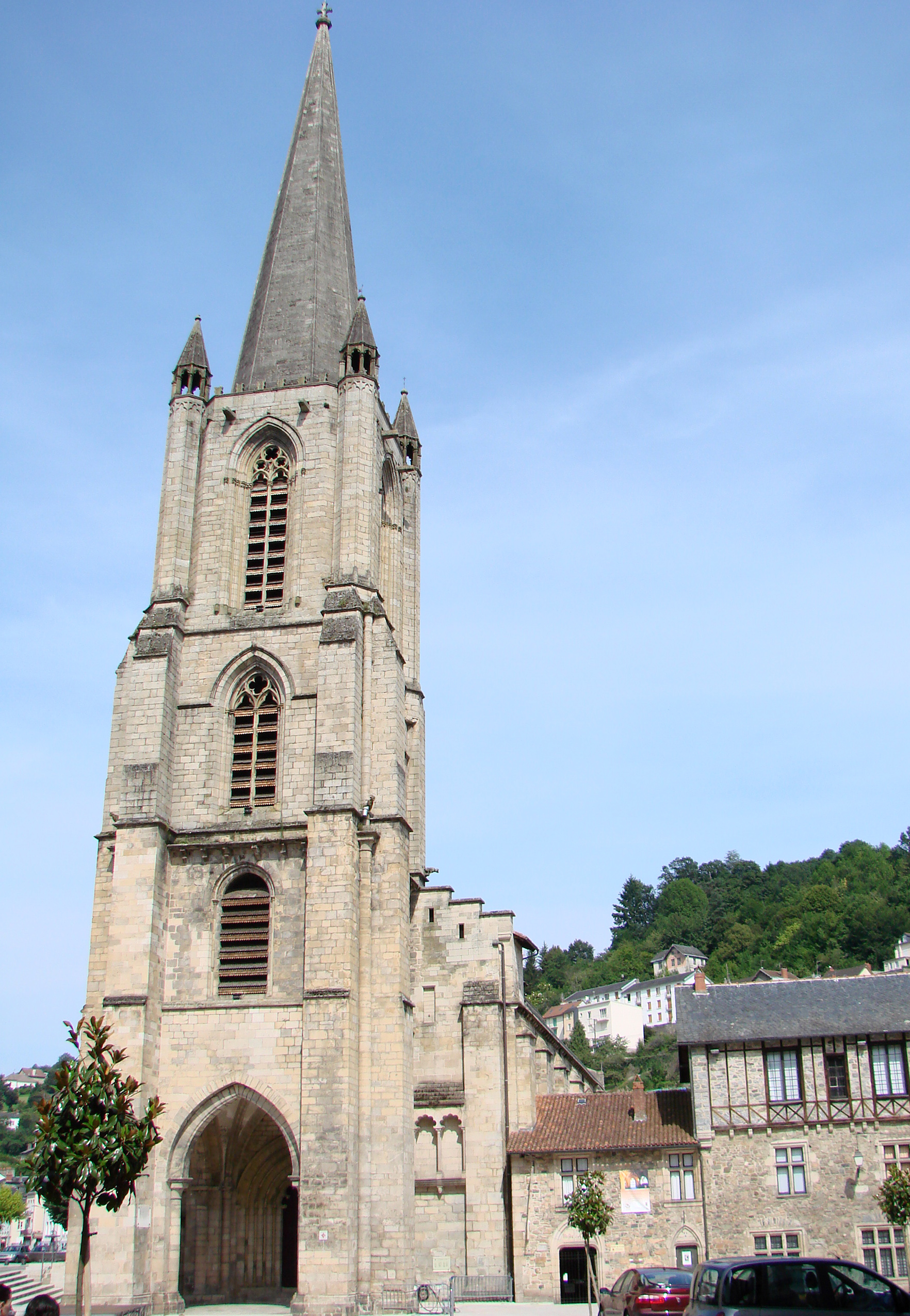
- Tulle Cathedral

Religion
- Affiliation: Roman Catholic Church
- Province: Bishopric of Tulle
- Region: Corrèze
- Rite: Roman
- Ecclesiastical or organisational status: Cathedral
- Status: Active

Location
- Location: Tulle, France
- Interactive map of Tulle Cathedral; Cathédrale Notre-Dame de Tulle

Architecture
- Type: church
- Style: Romanesque, Gothic
- Groundbreaking: 14th century
- Completed: 19th century

Tulle Cathedral (French: Cathédrale Notre-Dame de Tulle) is a Roman Catholic church located in the town of Tulle, France. The cathedral is the seat of the Bishopric of Tulle, which was established in 1317 after the Albigensian crusade.

== History ==
The diocese of Tulle was erected in 1317, in the territory of the Bas-Limousin in which belonged to the Bishopric of Limoges. The abbey church was then promoted to the cathedral.

The church was built on the site of a Merovingian abbey whose holders had acquired the episcopal dignity. Due to delays to the original architectural plan, construction went from the Romanesque design to the Gothic architectural style. These comprised changes in the cloister of the 13th century which now houses the Museum of Arts and Popular Traditions.

The pillars are of Romanesque design and the vault of the nave is of Gothic design.

The bell tower stands tall by its long spire reaching up to 75 meters. It dates back from the 14th century. It consists of three floors surmounted by an elegant octagonal spire and surrounded by graceful bell-towers.

On November 27, 1793, the cult of the goddess Raison was celebrated in the cathedral, and then closed to worship. The building was looted and ransacked. Later, a cannon factory was established there. The cathedral's nave was renovated in 1805.

== Sources ==
- Catholic Hierarchy: Diocese of Tulle
- http://www.lesconcertsducloitretulle.com/
- Tulle Cathedral at The Planet's Cathedral
- Tulle Cathedral at Structurae
