= Favars =

- Commune
- Coat of arms
- Location of Favars
- Location within France Location within Nouvelle-Aquitaine
- Coordinates: 45°15′51″N 1°40′43″E
- Country: France
- Region: Nouvelle-Aquitaine
- Department: Corrèze
- Arrondissement: Tulle
- Canton: Naves
- Intercommunality: CA Tulle Agglo

Government
  - Mayor (2020–2026): Bernard Jauvion
- Area^{1}: 11.88 km^{2} (4.59 sq mi)
- Highest elevation: 486 m (1,594 ft)
- Lowest elevation: 317 m (1,040 ft)
- Population (2023): 1,121
  - Density: 94.36/km^{2} (244.4/sq mi)
- Time zone: UTC+01:00 (CET)
  - Summer (DST): UTC+02:00 (CEST)
- INSEE/Postal code: 19082 /19330
- ^{1} French Land Register data, which excludes lakes, ponds, glaciers > 1 km^{2} (0.386 sq mi or 247 acres) and river estuaries.

Favars (French pronunciation: [favaʁ]) is a commune in the Corrèze department of central France.

== Population ==
Historical population
Year	Pop.	±% p.a.
1968	419	—
1975	558	+4.18%
1982	772	+4.75%
1990	902	+1.96%
1999	836	−0.84%
2007	939	+1.46%
2012	1,005	+1.37%
2017	1,072	+1.30%
2023	1,121	+0.75%
Source: INSEE

== See also ==
- Communes of the Corrèze department
