= Canton of Tulle =

Coordinates: 45.27°N 1.77°E

The canton of Tulle is an administrative division of the Corrèze department, south-central France. It was created at the French canton reorganisation which came into effect in March 2015. Its seat is in Tulle.

It consists of the following communes:

1. Tulle
