= Meyrignac-l'Église =

- Commune
- Coat of arms
- Location of Meyrignac-l'Église
- Location within France Location within Nouvelle-Aquitaine
- Coordinates: 45°24′06″N 1°51′09″E
- Country: France
- Region: Nouvelle-Aquitaine
- Department: Corrèze
- Arrondissement: Ussel
- Canton: Naves

Government
  - Mayor (2026–32): Bertrand Le Vaillant
- Area^{1}: 10.22 km^{2} (3.95 sq mi)
- Highest elevation: 813 m (2,667 ft)
- Lowest elevation: 430 m (1,410 ft)
- Population (2023): 64
  - Density: 6.3/km^{2} (16/sq mi)
- Time zone: UTC+01:00 (CET)
  - Summer (DST): UTC+02:00 (CEST)
- INSEE/Postal code: 19137 /19800
- ^{1} French Land Register data, which excludes lakes, ponds, glaciers > 1 km^{2} (0.386 sq mi or 247 acres) and river estuaries.

Meyrignac-l'Église (French pronunciation: [meʁiɲak leɡliz]; Occitan: Mairinhac l'Eglésia) is a commune in the Corrèze department in central France.

The village is the smallest town ever to host the opening of a stage of the Tour de France in 1998.

== Toponymy ==
The ancient forms of the locality are : in Matriniaco mansum 885, ecclesiam of Meyrinac 1105, cappellanus de Meyrinhac c. 1315, Meyrignac l'Eglise c. 1757 (to distinguish it from the village called Meyrignac-de-Bar), Meyrignac-la-Montagne, October 1793.

According to Ernest Nègre, the etymology of the locality corresponds to a Roman personal name Matrinus + suffix -acum. Michel Prodel shares this point of view and adds " the origin of these surnames is that of the theme of the Mother Goddesses, in particular those of springs and rivers, the nurturing mothers".

== Population ==
Historical population
Year	Pop.	±% p.a.
1968	95	—
1975	81	−2.25%
1982	59	−4.43%
1990	40	−4.74%
1999	46	+1.57%
2007	52	+1.54%
2012	54	+0.76%
2017	62	+2.80%
2023	64	+0.53%
Source: INSEE

== Places and monuments ==
- L'église paroissiale Sainte-Anne - church of the Romanesque and Gothic periods. Built on a mound, it has a sculpted porch. It was built in the 15th-century and rebuilt in 1894.
- L'étang de Meyrignac - lake covers an area of 17 ha.
- The different hamlets : Agnoux, Coustal, l'Étang, la Vialleneuve, le Cey-Neuf, la Pépinière, la Vialle, la Roubeyrotte, Miers, Salagnac, les Bories.
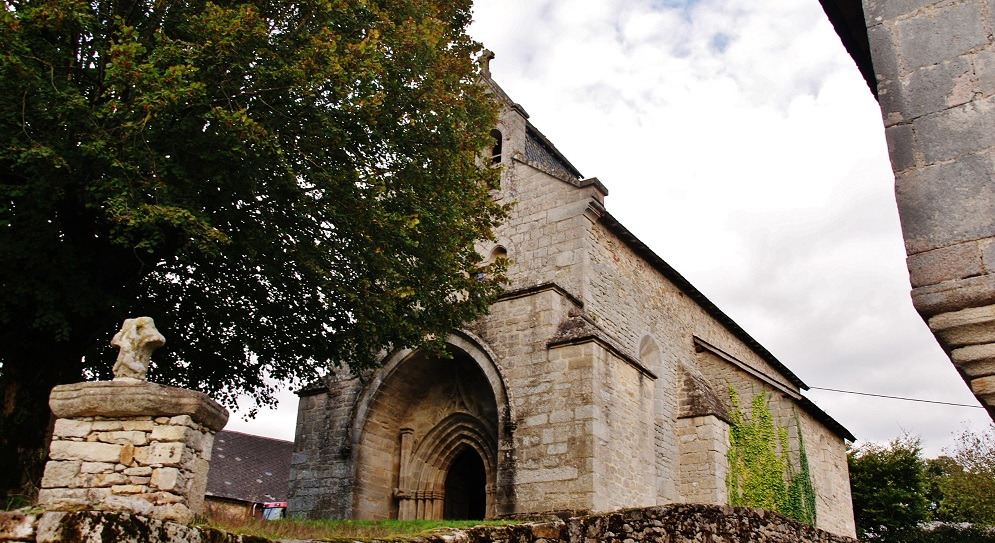
L'église paroissiale Sainte-Anne

== See also ==
- Communes of the Corrèze department
