= Orliac-de-Bar =

- Commune
- Coat of arms
- Location of Orliac-de-Bar
- Location within France Location within Nouvelle-Aquitaine
- Coordinates: 45°21′42″N 1°48′06″E
- Country: France
- Region: Nouvelle-Aquitaine
- Department: Corrèze
- Arrondissement: Tulle
- Canton: Naves
- Intercommunality: CA Tulle Agglo

Government
  - Mayor (2020–2026): Bruno Fleury
- Area^{1}: 14.97 km^{2} (5.78 sq mi)
- Elevation: 428 m (1,404 ft)
- Highest elevation: 528 m (1,732 ft)
- Lowest elevation: 268 m (879 ft)
- Population (2023): 256
  - Density: 17.1/km^{2} (44.3/sq mi)
- Time zone: UTC+01:00 (CET)
  - Summer (DST): UTC+02:00 (CEST)
- INSEE/Postal code: 19155 /19390
- ^{1} French Land Register data, which excludes lakes, ponds, glaciers > 1 km^{2} (0.386 sq mi or 247 acres) and river estuaries.

Orliac-de-Bar (French pronunciation: [ɔʁljak də baʁ]; Occitan: Orlhac de Bar) is a commune in the Corrèze department in central France.

== Population ==
Historical population
Year	Pop.	±% p.a.
1968	289	—
1975	253	−1.88%
1982	273	+1.09%
1990	234	−1.91%
1999	231	−0.14%
2007	260	+1.49%
2012	273	+0.98%
2017	283	+0.72%
2023	256	−1.66%
Source: INSEE

== Places and monuments ==
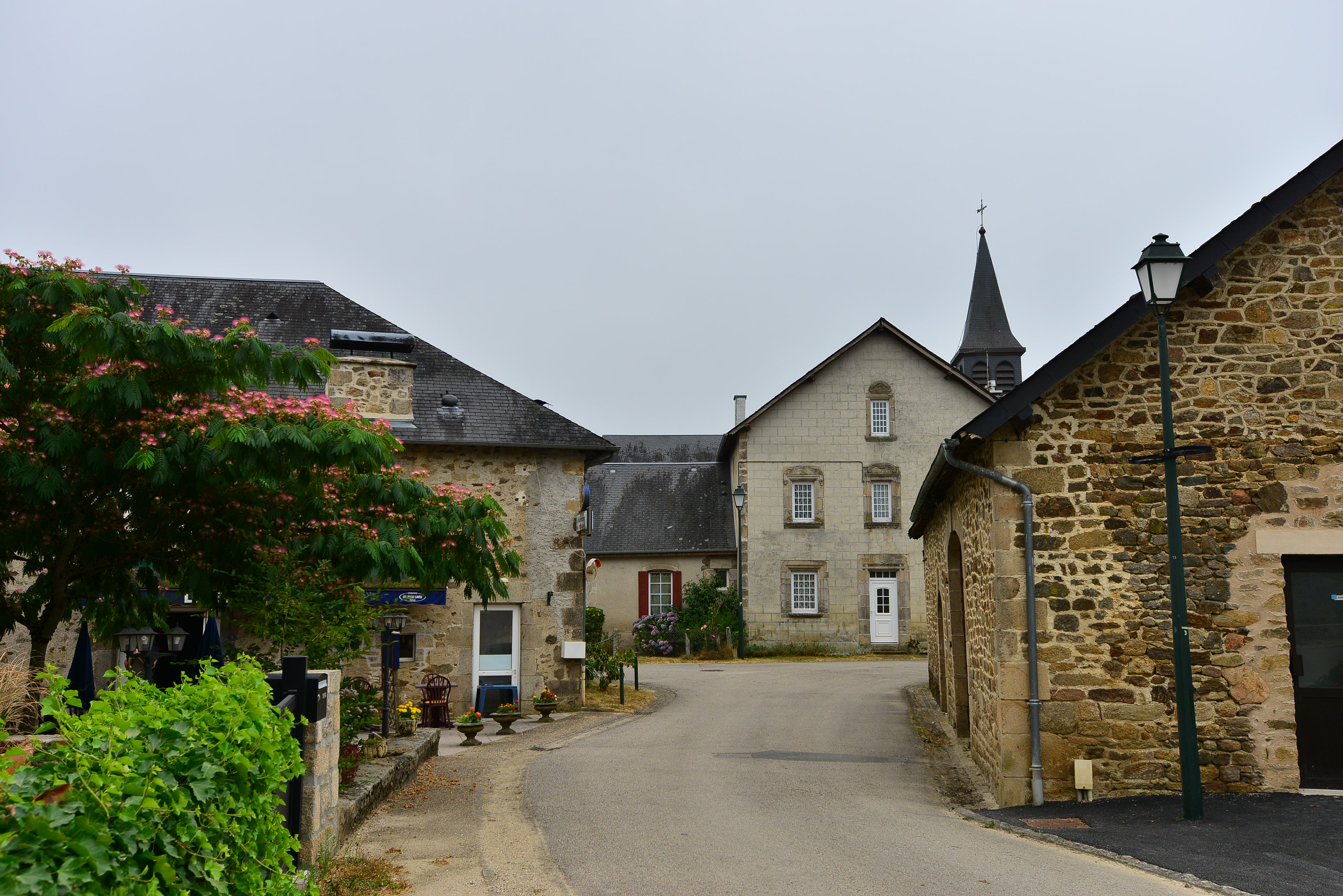
Village

The Church of Saint-Laurent of Orliac-de-Bar is quoted in historical writings from the 12th century, but was rebuilt in the 15th century. It is endowed with a Gothic portal and treasures classified as historical monuments: The bells, the baroque tabernacle from the 17th century with wings in gilded wood, the statue of the Madonna of Pity of the fifteenth century, the reliquary and the shrine.

== See also ==
- Communes of the Corrèze department
