= Corrèze (river) =

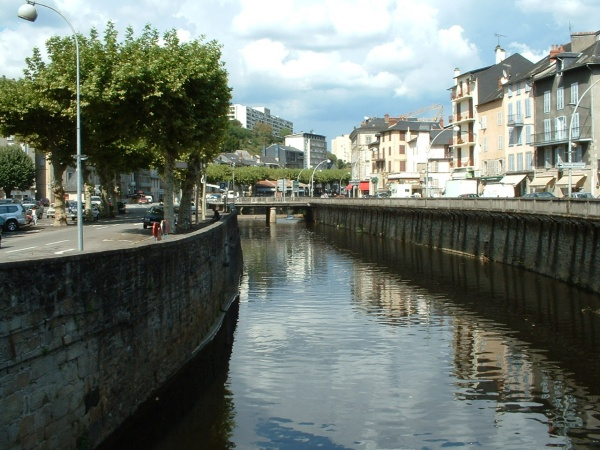
- The Corrèze in Tulle.

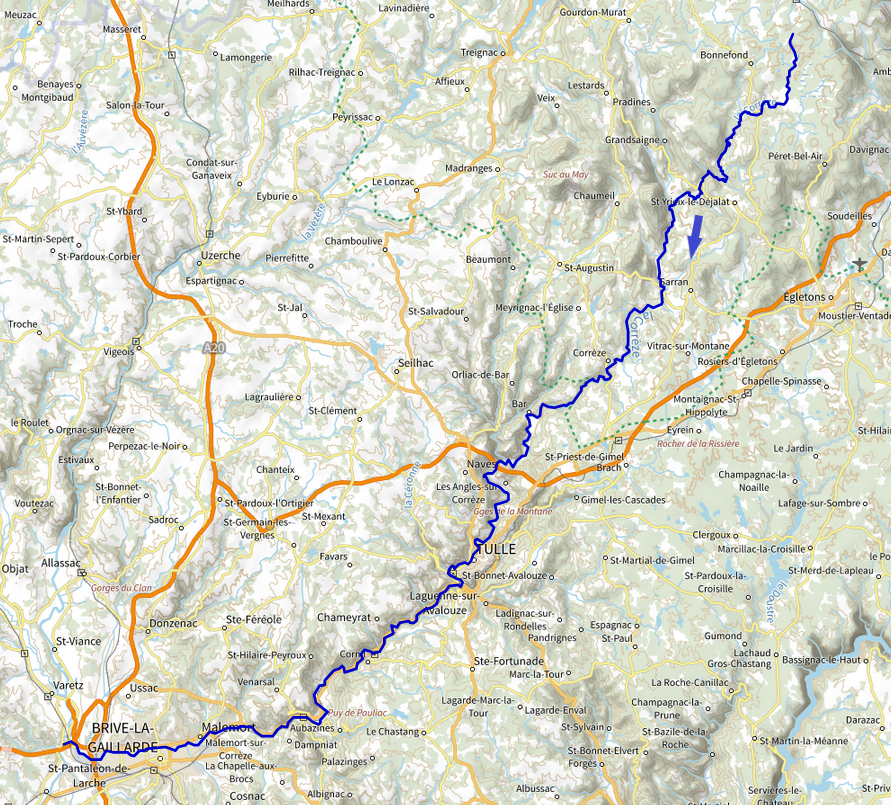

Location
- Country: France

Physical characteristics
- Source
  - location: Massif Central
- Mouth
  - location: Vézère
  - coordinates: 45°9′58″N 1°27′37″E
- Length: 95 km (59 mi)
- Basin size: 947 km^{2} (366 sq mi)
- Discharge
  - average: 21 m^{3}/s (740 cu ft/s)

Basin features
- Progression: Vézère → Dordogne→ Gironde estuary→ Atlantic Ocean

The Corrèze (Occitan: Corresa) is a 95 km long river in south-western France, left tributary of the river Vézère. Its source is in the north-western Massif Central. It flows south-west through the Corrèze département (named after the river) and the cities of Tulle and Brive-la-Gaillarde. A few kilometers downstream from Brive-la-Gaillarde, the Corrèze flows into the Vézère.
