= Tulle, Corrèze =

Prefecture and commune in Nouvelle-Aquitaine, France

Tulle Tula (Occitan)
- Prefecture and commune
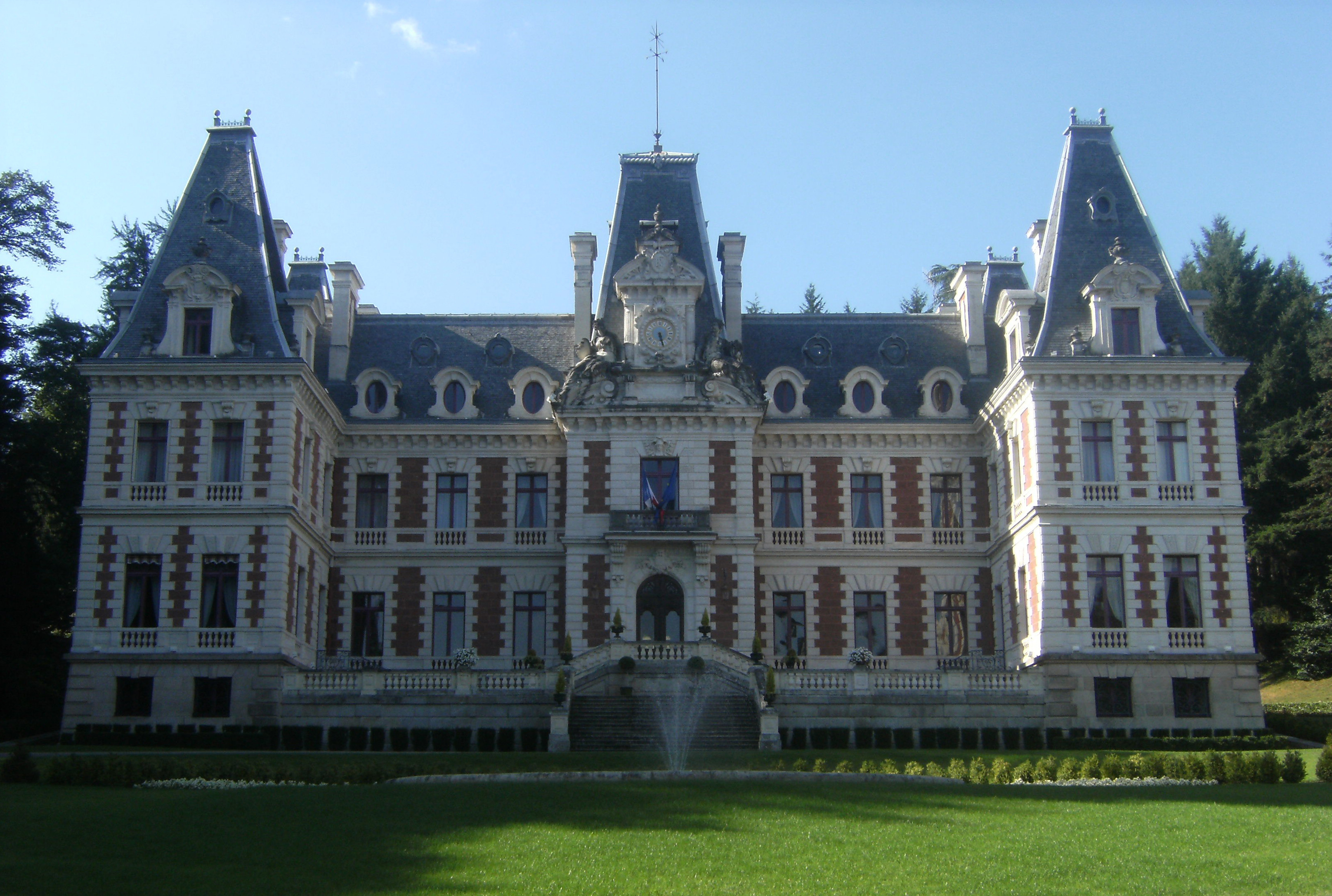
- Prefecture building in Tulle

- Coat of arms
- Motto(s): Sunt rupes virtutis iter (There are rocks on the path to virtue)
- Location of Tulle
- Location within France Location within Nouvelle-Aquitaine
- Coordinates: 45°16′04″N 1°46′14″E
- Country: France
- Region: Nouvelle-Aquitaine
- Department: Corrèze
- Arrondissement: Tulle
- Canton: Tulle
- Intercommunality: CA Tulle Agglo

Government
  - Mayor (2020–2026): Bernard Combes (PS)
- Area^{1}: 24.44 km^{2} (9.44 sq mi)
- Highest elevation: 460 m (1,510 ft)
- Lowest elevation: 185 m (607 ft)
- Population (2023): 13,401
  - Density: 548.3/km^{2} (1,420/sq mi)
- Demonym: Tullistes
- Time zone: UTC+01:00 (CET)
  - Summer (DST): UTC+02:00 (CEST)
- INSEE/Postal code: 19272 /19000
- ^{1} French Land Register data, which excludes lakes, ponds, glaciers > 1 km^{2} (0.386 sq mi or 247 acres) and river estuaries.

Tulle (French: [tyl]; Occitan: Tula [ˈtylɔ]) is a commune in central France. It is the prefecture and the second-largest town (after Brive-la-Gaillarde) of the department of Corrèze, in the region of Nouvelle-Aquitaine. Tulle is also the episcopal see of the Roman Catholic Diocese of Tulle.

Stretching over more than three kilometres in the narrow and tortuous Corrèze valley, Tulle spreads its old quarters on the hillside overlooking the river, while the Notre-Dame cathedral emerges from the heart of the town. Known sometimes as "the town on seven hills", Tulle rose to prominence through the development of its manufacturing sector.

== History ==
=== Antiquity ===
The origins of the town are still subject to debate today but it would seem that the present puy Saint-Clair, a rocky spur with steep slopes separating the Corrèze valley from that of the Solane, was an ideal location for the establishment of a Gallic oppidum. For a long time, it seems that the town has been an important crossroads on the road between Armorique and the Mediterranean Sea and on the road between Aquitaine and the Rhone Valley, both of which crossed the Corrèze at this point by a ford.

With the Roman occupation, the place would have been converted into a necropolis and temple in honour of Tutela, a Roman divine power to whom the protection of people, things and especially places was entrusted, would have been built. This Roman goddess, protector of the travellers who used to use the ford, is the namesake of the city. The temple of Tutela must have been located in the Trech district, whose name refers to the crossing of a river. The real urban centre of the region moved a few kilometres north, to the commune of Naves and the site of Tintignac, which became a crossroads between the Roman roads that followed the ancient routes of the Celtic period.

=== Middle Ages ===
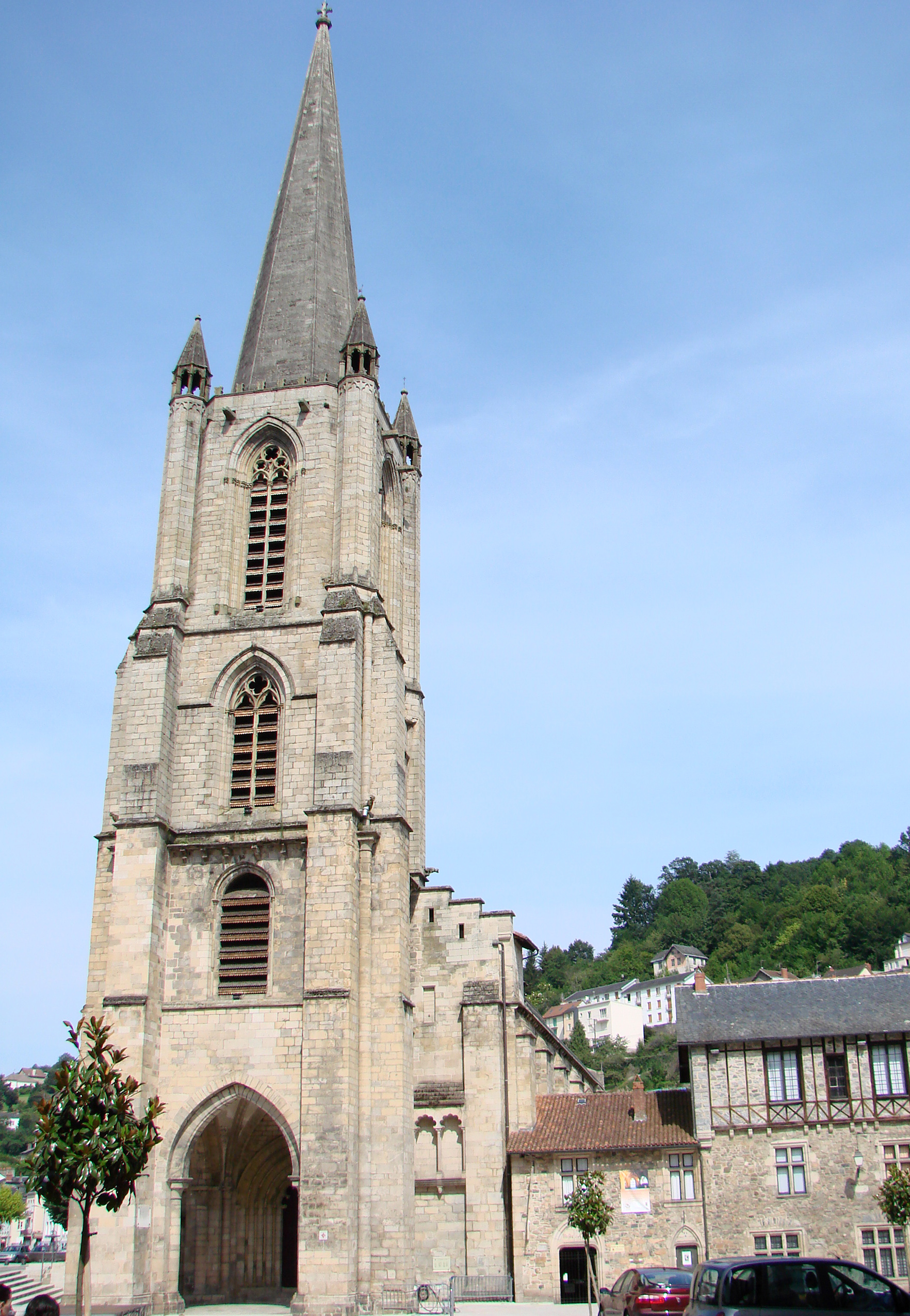
The cathedral Notre-Dame of Tulle

The Merovingian period would have seen the Christianization of the city and the establishment of three places of worship dedicated to St. Martin, St. Peter and St. Julian. The city officially entered history only with the transformation in the 7th century of the church dedicated to Saint Martin into a monastery under the impetus of Calmine, already founder of the monastery of Mozat in Auvergne. Around the places of worship began to gather the inhabitants of the country and Tulle became once again an urban centre, a status lost since the Roman conquest.

The town was plundered several times by the Vikings, despite being several hundred kilometres from the sea, and it was during one of these sackings, in 846, that the first monastery was destroyed. To warn the inhabitants of the town of the arrival of the Vikings, a watchtower was built on a rocky promontory at Cornil, a few kilometres downstream from the Corrèze.

The place was nevertheless considered safe by many churches on the Atlantic coast who had sent their relics there to preserve them from looting, notably those of Saint Clair, Saint Lô and Saint Baumard. The monastery was later rebuilt but disappeared in the 11th century. In 1989, excavations under the nave of the present cathedral uncovered the remains of an apsidiole dating from the Carolingian period as well as a poly-lobed portal of Mozarabic influence.

New constructions are undertaken for the abbey, now dedicated to Saint Martin and converted to Benedictine rule in the 11th century. On a visit to Tulle in 1095, Pope Urban II granted it his protection. The first stone of the new abbey church was laid in 1130 but the building was not completed until two centuries later. The spire of the 12th century culminates at a height of 75 metres, making it the highest in Limousin. In 2005, during construction in the vicinity of the cathedral, excavations uncovered the north wall of the medieval church of Saint-Julien, the discovery of a cemetery and three granite sarcophagi dating from the High Middle Ages. In addition, the Gothic cloister is the last one preserved in Limousin.

In 1317, Pope John XXII created the diocese of Tulle by detaching fifty-two parishes from the diocese of Limoges and the abbey-church became a cathedral. During the Hundred Years' War, the English took the city in 1346 before being driven out of it a month later by the Count of Armagnac, suffering in quick succession two trying sieges during which the inhabitants were reduced to famine. In 1370, the city sided with the King of France, Charles V, which earned it tax exemption and the ennoblement of several bourgeois families. But in 1373, the Duke of Lancaster appeared before the city and demanded that the gates be opened to him, and, in the absence of any command, a representative assembly of the population was convened and decided to carry out the request to avoid a new sacking. The pardon of the King of France for this betrayal took place in 1375.

The Black Death hit the city in 1348 and, on the evening of 23 June, in despair, the city authorities decided to march behind a statue of Saint John to stop what was considered a divine scourge. The plague ceased shortly afterwards, and the Tullists promised to renew this procession every year. It is still perpetuated today and is called the "Procession of the Lunade".

At the beginning of the 15th century, the town fell victim to the so-called "roadmen", brigands such as Jean de La Roche who set fire to the town in 1426 or Rodrigue de Villandrando to whom the town had to pay a large ransom in order to be spared in 1436. In 1430, the bishop recognised the power of thirty-four prud'hommes, also called "boniviri", who had military and financial powers but who had in fact been dealing with the affairs of the community unofficially since the 13th century. In 1443, Charles VII convened the Estates General of Bas-Limousin in Tulle.

The town was then divided between l'Enclos, the district around the abbey-church where the nobles, bourgeois and clerics lived, and the upper town, where most of the population lived, around the castle, located on the puy Saint-Clair and which is still characterized today by its narrow, steep streets, sometimes with stairs. In the 14th century, several noble families (Saint-Martial de Puy-de-Val, Rodarel de Seilliac, ...) began to extend the town on the left bank of the Corrèze, opposite the Cathedral, in the Alverge district, on the road towards Auvergne. In the 15th century, the city expanded outside its ramparts, in suburbs along the roads towards Aquitaine and the South (la Barrière and le Pilou), to Limoges and Paris (la Barussie, le Trech, le Fouret, la Rivière) and towards Auvergne (l'Alverge and le Canton).

=== Modern period ===
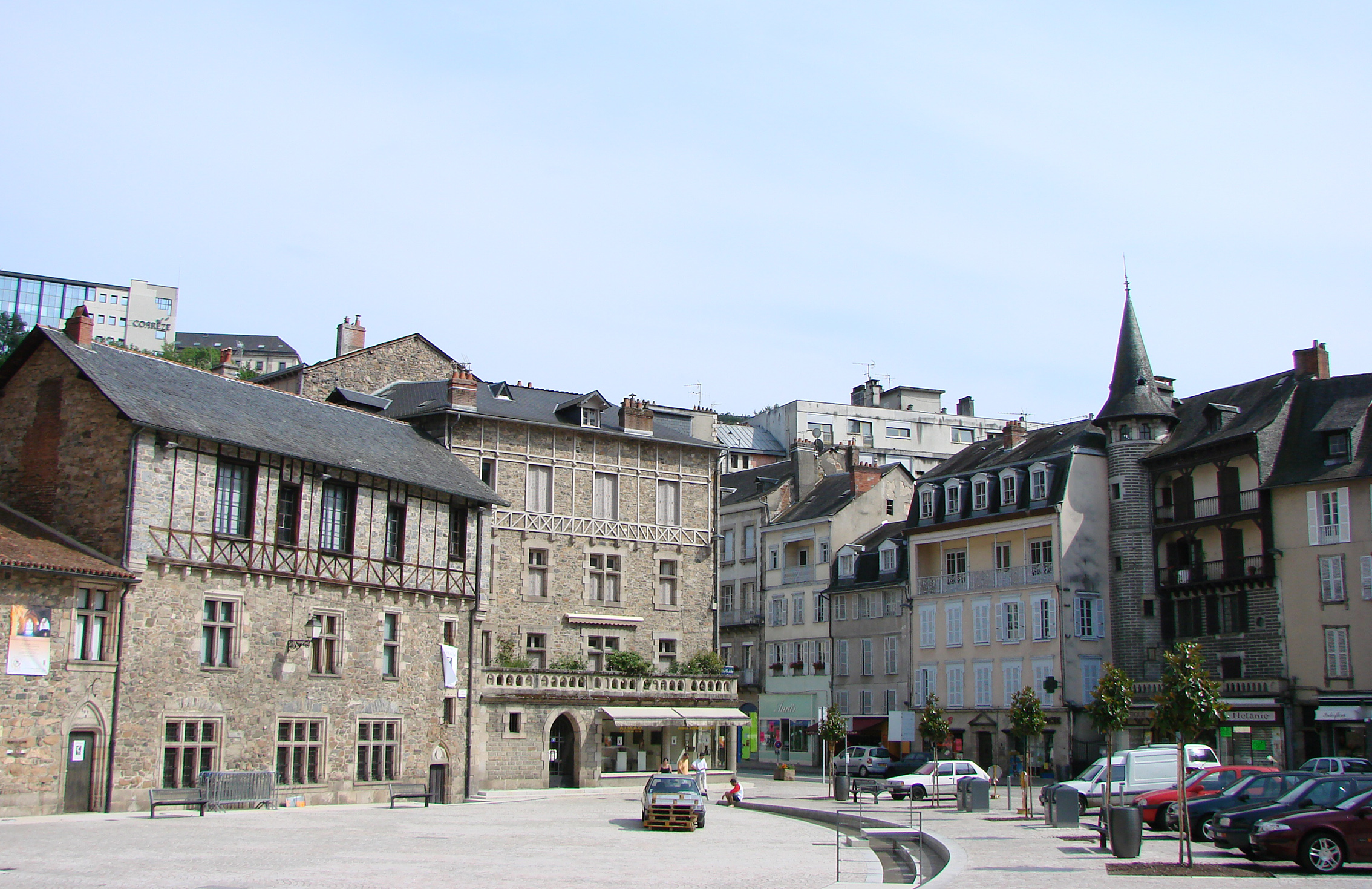
View in front of the cathedral in Tulle

The abbey is practically disused with the secularization of 1514. The bishop had a castle built and the refectory became the seat of the court. In 1566, King Charles IX endows the town with a town hall and a consulate which definitively reduces the power of the bishop.

During the Wars of Religion, Tulle held out for the Catholics; the town first resisted the Huguenots in 1577, but the troops of the Viscount of Turenne took bloody revenge in 1585. They ransacked and devastated the town after an assault that the Protestant poet Agrippa d'Aubigné recounted.

In the 16th century, the nobles and bourgeois of Tulle engaged in a veritable architectural competition, of which buildings with finely crafted facades in Renaissance style such as the Hôtel de Lauthonye (1551), the Hôtel de Ventadour or the Loyac house described by Prosper Mérimée in 1838, still stand today. In the 16th century, a college was created and in 1620, teaching was entrusted to the Jesuits. In 1670, the town was equipped with a general hospital.

Numerous religious congregations settled in the town, the Recollects (1601), the Poor Clares (1605), the Feuillants (1615), the Ursulines (1618), the Bernardines (1622), the Visitandines and the Carmelites (1644) as well as the Benedictines in 1650. In 1705, Sister Marcelline Pauper founded a house in Tulle for the congregation of the Sisters of Charity of Nevers, to relieve the misery of the people and to teach children to read.

From the 17th century onwards, new economic activities appeared, the mills on the Corrèze and Solane rivers being used to produce paper for example. The lace craft develops and the "poinct de Tulle" develops until its fame becomes worldwide, tulle being frequently used for wedding dresses in particular. It was also the beginning of the arms industry in Tulle with the establishment of a factory in 1691 resulting from the collaboration between the master harquebusier Pauphile and the financier Fénis de Lacombe. The firearms factory will become a royal factory in 1777.

The mutilations of the cathedral and the abbey buildings were very significant during the French Revolution because, converted into a weapons factory, all the fittings, including the irons supporting the dome, were torn off for recovery, causing the collapse of the dome, the chevet, the transept and the north gallery of the cloister in 1796. The Episcopal Palace, two parish churches and several chapels in the suburbs were destroyed during the Revolution. The church was reopened for worship in 1803 but did not regain its title of cathedral until 1823, while the dome was never rebuilt, the nave being simply closed and the open space used for a promenade along the Corrèze on the current Quai Edmond-Perrier.

=== Contemporary era ===
==== From the 19th century to World War II ====
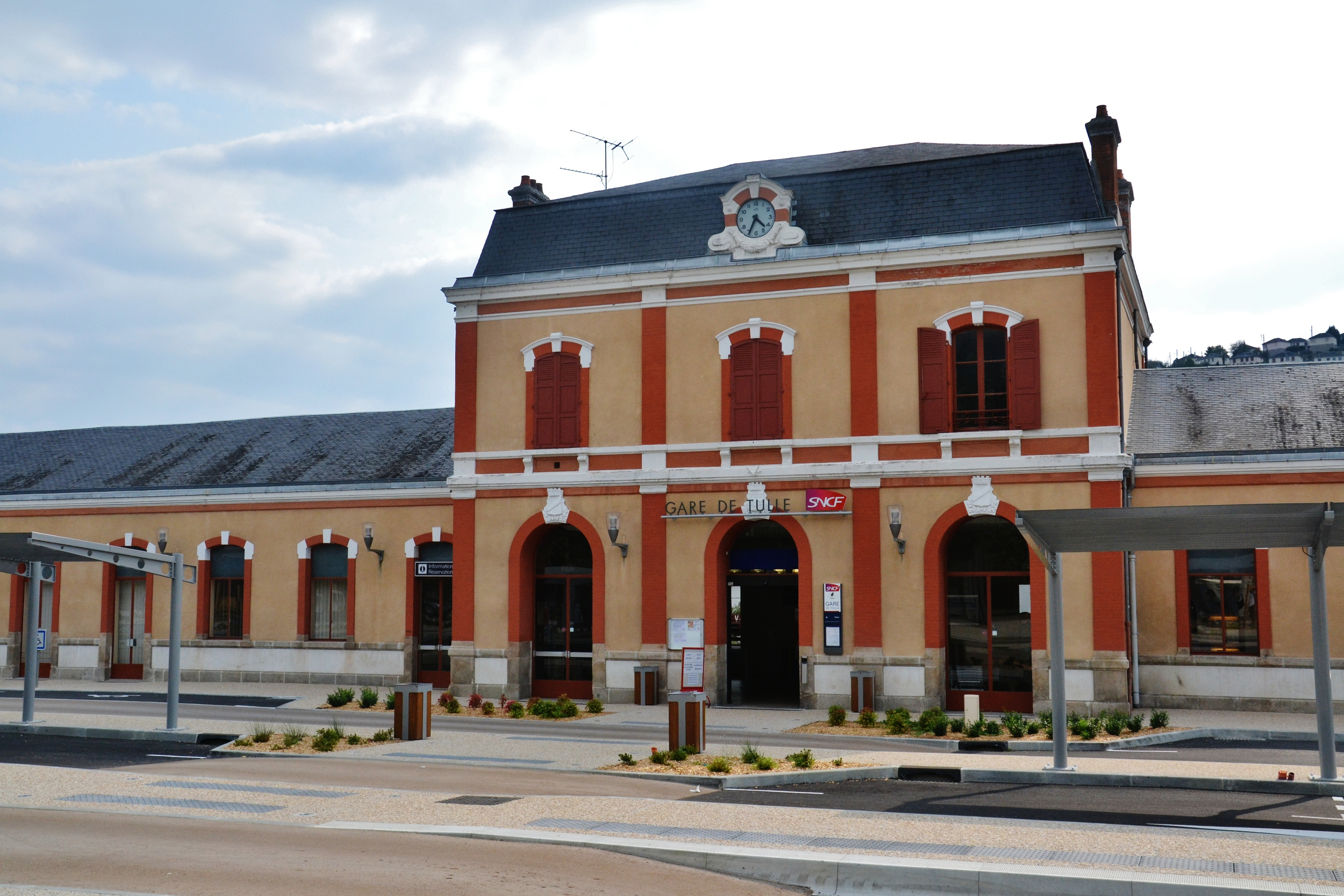
Tulle railway station

During the 19th century, the physiognomy of Tulle changed a lot. A railway station opened in Souilhac district in 1871 and the town was then connected to the national railway network via Brive-la-Gaillarde. At the same time, new industries were created, notably the firearms factory. In 1886, the latter was nationalized and settled in the new district of Souilhac, along the Céronne, a river that would provide it with electricity with the construction of a hydroelectric power station in 1888.

From 1917 onwards, trains passing on the nearby tracks would supply the thermal power station with coal at the level of the present Socio-Cultural Centre. Up to 5,000 employees worked at the "Manu'" as it was then known. The Manu' was the economic lung of the city and influenced the social composition of the Tullist population, which was strongly coloured by the workers.

The urban junction between the working-class district of Souilhac and the historic district of the cathedral is made by the urbanization of the current avenue Victor-Hugo. As in many other French cities inspired by the renovations of Baron Haussmann in Paris, the end of the 19th century saw the city open up, notably with the construction of the current Avenue du Général-de-Gaulle in the Trech district and the enlargement of the Place de la Cathédrale. At the same time, work was undertaken to limit the frequent floods and to clean up the city by burying the Solane river, which until then had flowed at the foot of the buildings.

The city also acquired new public buildings in its role as the prefecture and main city of the department, such as the construction of the Town Hall (former bishopric), the Prefecture, the Hôtel Marbot (former Grand Séminaire), the Law Courts, the Post Office, the Halle-Gymnase (now the Latreille Hall) and the Lycée Edmond-Perrier, many of which were built in an Art Nouveau style. Completed in 1899, the Theatre is a monument of Anatole de Baudot, the first building of its kind in the world in reinforced cement. From the beginning of the 20th century, the town began to spread out on the very steep slopes of the valley and urbanisation spread.

Tulle became a garrison town from 1841, when an infantry regiment settled in the former barracks located on the Champ-de-Mars, on the current site of the Cité administrative, along the Corrèze.

From 1917 to 1922, Tulle was in the spotlight of the French press because of a news item. Over 100 anonymous letters were sent, denouncing all the secrets of the inhabitants of the city. The sender was actually Angele Laval, a spurned and insane woman. This fact inspired Clouzot for his film Le Corbeau and Cocteau for his play La Machine à écrire.

==== World War II ====
During the Second World War, the 2nd SS Division Das Reich division of the Waffen SS perpetrated a reprisal massacre of civilians in Tulle, following the killing and maiming of some 40 German soldiers in Tulle on 8 June 1944 by the Maquis resistance movement.

On 9 June 1944 a large number of male civilians were rounded up by the SS. Of these, 97 were randomly selected and then hanged from lamp posts and balconies in the town. Another 321 captives were sent to forced labour camps in Germany where 101 died. In total, the actions of the Wehrmacht, the Waffen-SS, and the SD claimed the lives of 213 civilian residents of Tulle.

==== Since the 1960s ====
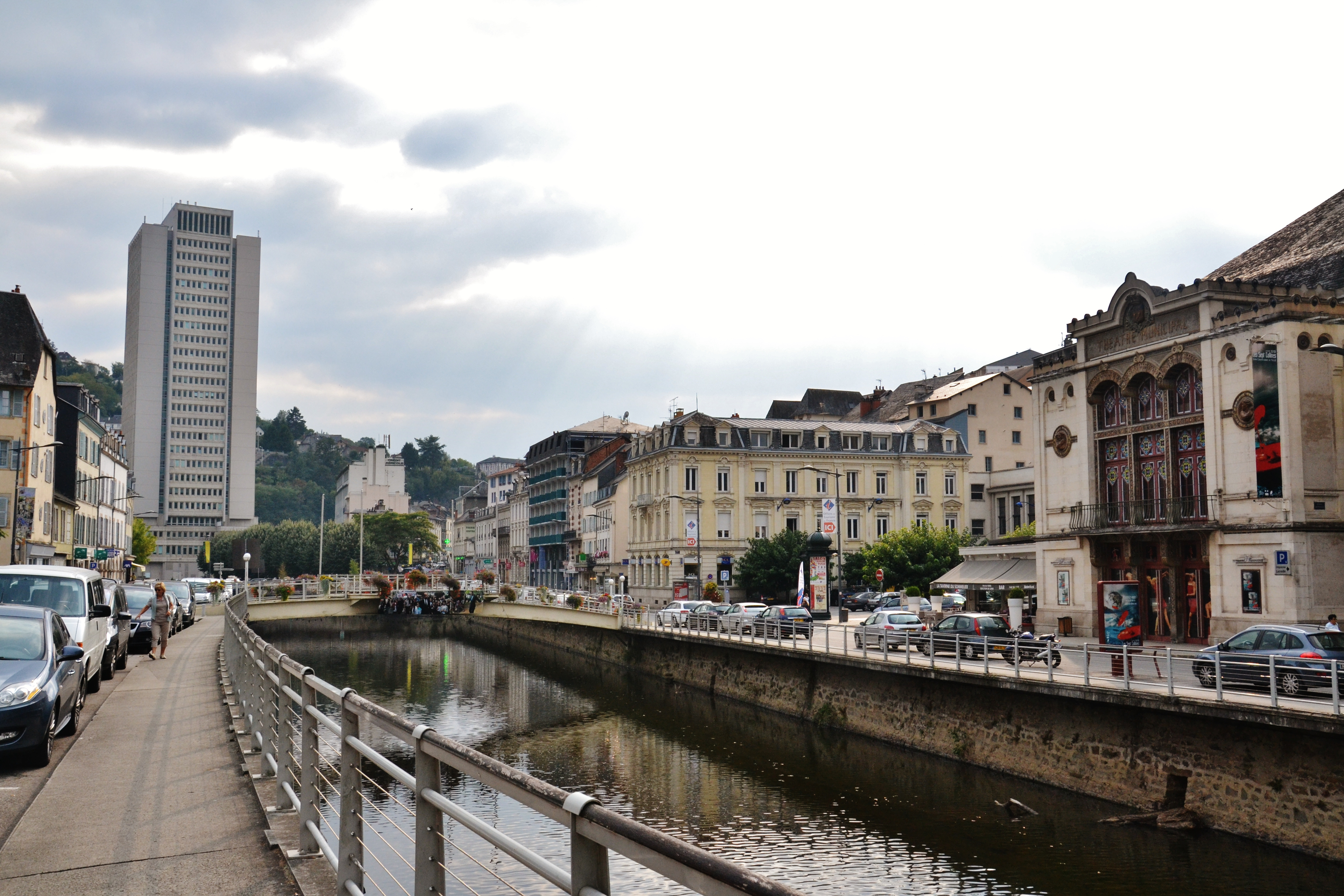
View of the city center from the Escurol bridge

In the last stages of the Algerian War and its aftermath, four military officers involved in instigating a failed coup aimed at deposing President de Gaulle were held in the prison at Tulle. De Gaulle referred at the time to "those idiotic generals playing ball in Tulle Prison". The four were Raoul Salan, Edmond Jouhaud, Maurice Challe and André Zeller. The last of them to be released was Salan, amnestied on 15 June 1968 in the wake of "The Events" of May 1968.

In 1972, the annex of the Army Technical Teaching School (EETAT) was created in Tulle to train electromechanical engineers, accountants and mechanics. In 1977, an annex of the National Technical School of the Army (ENTSOA) was opened and closed in 1984. It was replaced in 1983 by the Gendarmerie School of Tulle, located in the barracks of La Bachellerie, which today accommodates around 1,100 gendarme students.

The 1973 film The Day of the Jackal, a political thriller directed by Fred Zinnemann and starring Edward Fox and Michael Lonsdale, is partly set and partly filmed in the Tulle area. Based on Frederick Forsyth's 1971 novel The Day of the Jackal, the film is about a professional assassin known only as the "Jackal", who is hired to assassinate French president Charles de Gaulle in the summer of 1963 and uses the Tulle area and some of its fictional residents as cover for the preparations for the assassination attempt.

Today, Tulle, prefecture of Corrèze and bishopric, is no longer the seat of a weapons factory. Until the 1980s, MAT had been the largest employer in Limousin, but the state-owned company Giat Industries, now Nexter, has carried out numerous restructurings over the last few decades, reducing the historic Tulle production site to 120 employees. A weapons museum was created in 1979 by the staff of the factory.

Since 1973, the town centre has had a tower, the Cité administrative (Administrative City Tower), which has 22 levels and is 86 m high on the river side.

In 1996, Tulle hosted the finish of a stage of the Tour de France starting from Super-Besse (Puy-de-Dôme).

On 6 May 2012, the newly elected president, François Hollande, mayor of Tulle between 2001 and 2008, gave his first speech as President of the French Republic on the Cathedral Square, which was attended by several thousand people, including some 400 French and foreign journalists and several helicopters.

== Geography ==
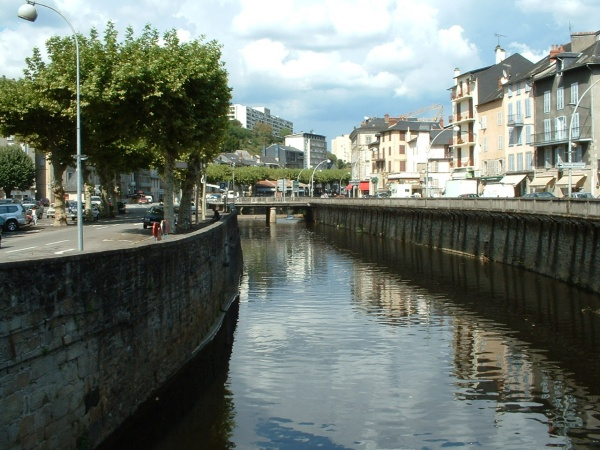
The Corrèze river in Tulle

Tulle is the third largest town in Limousin, behind Limoges and Brive-la-Gaillarde. It is situated in a very deep part of the river Corrèze valley, at its confluence with several of its tributaries, the Solane and the Céronne on the right bank, and the Saint-Bonnette and the Montane on the left bank. It stretches along a very narrow strip several kilometres long from the northeast to the southwest.

=== Climate ===
Tulle has an oceanic climate under the Köppen classification (Cfb). Rainfall is high year-round and temperature differences between seasons are larger than in coastal areas.

Climate data for Tulle (1991–2020 normals, extremes 1957–present)
Month	Jan	Feb	Mar	Apr	May	Jun	Jul	Aug	Sep	Oct	Nov	Dec	Year
Record high °C (°F)	20.5 (68.9)	25.0 (77.0)	27.0 (80.6)	30.1 (86.2)	34.0 (93.2)	39.7 (103.5)	40.8 (105.4)	40.5 (104.9)	36.7 (98.1)	31.4 (88.5)	25.8 (78.4)	20.2 (68.4)	40.8 (105.4)
Mean daily maximum °C (°F)	8.7 (47.7)	10.4 (50.7)	14.7 (58.5)	17.5 (63.5)	21.4 (70.5)	25.0 (77.0)	27.2 (81.0)	27.3 (81.1)	23.2 (73.8)	18.5 (65.3)	12.4 (54.3)	9.2 (48.6)	18.0 (64.4)
Daily mean °C (°F)	4.6 (40.3)	5.2 (41.4)	8.6 (47.5)	11.2 (52.2)	14.8 (58.6)	18.3 (64.9)	20.2 (68.4)	20.2 (68.4)	16.4 (61.5)	12.9 (55.2)	7.9 (46.2)	5.0 (41.0)	12.1 (53.8)
Mean daily minimum °C (°F)	0.5 (32.9)	0.1 (32.2)	2.5 (36.5)	4.9 (40.8)	8.3 (46.9)	11.6 (52.9)	13.2 (55.8)	13.0 (55.4)	9.6 (49.3)	7.3 (45.1)	3.3 (37.9)	0.9 (33.6)	6.3 (43.3)
Record low °C (°F)	−21.0 (−5.8)	−16.1 (3.0)	−13.0 (8.6)	−7.0 (19.4)	−2.4 (27.7)	−0.5 (31.1)	4.7 (40.5)	2.0 (35.6)	0.0 (32.0)	−5.4 (22.3)	−10.0 (14.0)	−15.5 (4.1)	−21.0 (−5.8)
Average precipitation mm (inches)	117.5 (4.63)	95.7 (3.77)	97.0 (3.82)	111.2 (4.38)	101.4 (3.99)	93.1 (3.67)	77.4 (3.05)	78.1 (3.07)	92.2 (3.63)	110.3 (4.34)	130.5 (5.14)	131.7 (5.19)	1,236.1 (48.67)
Average precipitation days (≥ 1.0 mm)	13.8	11.0	11.7	12.5	11.9	9.7	8.6	8.9	9.5	12.1	13.6	13.8	137.1
Source: Meteociel

== Transport ==
Tulle is located at the crossroads of several routes:

- Bordeaux - Clermont-Ferrand - Lyon axis: RD 1089 and the A89 motorway;
- Uzerche - Sévérac-le-Château axis: link between the A20 and the A75 via Tulle, Argentat-sur-Dordogne, Aurillac, Montsalvy, Espalion and Laissac. This corresponds to taking the RD 1120 then the departmental roads 920 and 28 and finally the RN 88.

Tulle station has rail connections to Brive-la-Gaillarde, Ussel and Bordeaux. Tulle is the meeting point between the South-West of France and the Massif Central. It is the former capital of Bas-Limousin, whose boundaries correspond approximately to the current department of Corrèze.

== Economy ==
Tulle's role as a centre for lace making is highlighted by an "international lace festival" held each August. The town is also home to the Maugein accordion factory, which once employed 200, though this figure is now much reduced. Near to this there was, until recently, a significant armaments manufacturing business, but its site is now (2011) marked only by an armaments museum.

Located in another part of town is a car parts plant owned by the American Borg-Warner company, and employing approximately 300 people.

== Government ==
- Tulle is the seat of the general council of the Corrèze
- Tulle is the seat of the agglomeration community Tulle Agglo
- Tulle is the seat of the canton of Tulle, which consists of the commune of Tulle
- Tulle is the prefecture of the Corrèze department

=== Mayors ===
Mayors of Tulle since 1949 were:

- Jean Massoulier (1949–1959) for the Radicals
- Jean Montalat (1959–1971) for the SFIO
- Georges Mouly (1971–1977) for the RPR
- Jean Combasteil (1977–1995) for the PCF
- Raymond-Max Aubert (1995–2001) for the RPR
- François Hollande (2001–2008) for the PS (elected President of the Republic in 2012)
- Bernard Combes (2008– ) for the PS

=== Politics ===
Tulle's MP in the National Assembly of France for nearly 15 years was the Socialist François Hollande, who was elected President of the Republic in 2012. Hollande also served as mayor of the town.

== Population ==
Historical population

Year	Pop.	±% p.a.
1793	9,662	—
1800	9,362	−0.45%
1806	9,153	−0.38%
1821	8,097	−0.81%
1831	8,689	+0.71%
1836	9,700	+2.23%
1841	9,669	−0.06%
1846	10,769	+2.18%
1851	11,895	+2.01%
1856	11,653	−0.41%
1861	12,410	+1.27%
1866	12,606	+0.31%
1872	13,680	+1.37%
1876	15,342	+2.91%
1881	16,196	+1.09%
1886	16,277	+0.10%
1891	18,964	+3.10%
1896	17,374	−1.74%
1901	17,412	+0.04%

Year	Pop.	±% p.a.
1906	17,245	−0.19%
1911	15,942	−1.56%
1921	13,732	−1.48%
1926	14,349	+0.88%
1931	15,021	+0.92%
1936	15,617	+0.78%
1946	18,202	+1.54%
1954	19,372	+0.78%
1962	19,084	−0.19%
1968	20,016	+0.80%
1975	20,100	+0.06%
1982	18,880	−0.89%
1990	17,164	−1.18%
1999	15,553	−1.09%
2007	15,647	+0.08%
2012	14,336	−1.73%
2017	14,836	+0.69%
2023	13,401	−1.68%

Source: EHESS and INSEE

== Education ==
- Normal school of teachers
- ISMIB (Higher Institute of Management of Woodworking Industries)
- IUT of Nouvelle-Aquitaine: departments Health, Safety and Environment (HSE) and Industrial Engineering and Maintenance (GIM)
- Lycée Edmond Perrier: establishment of secondary and higher education, technologic and general (1100 pupils). The school offers a Scientific CPGE (Preparatory classes schools).
- Institute of Nursing Education
- Gendarmerie training school
- CFA (Training center for apprentices) of the 13 vents

== Culture ==
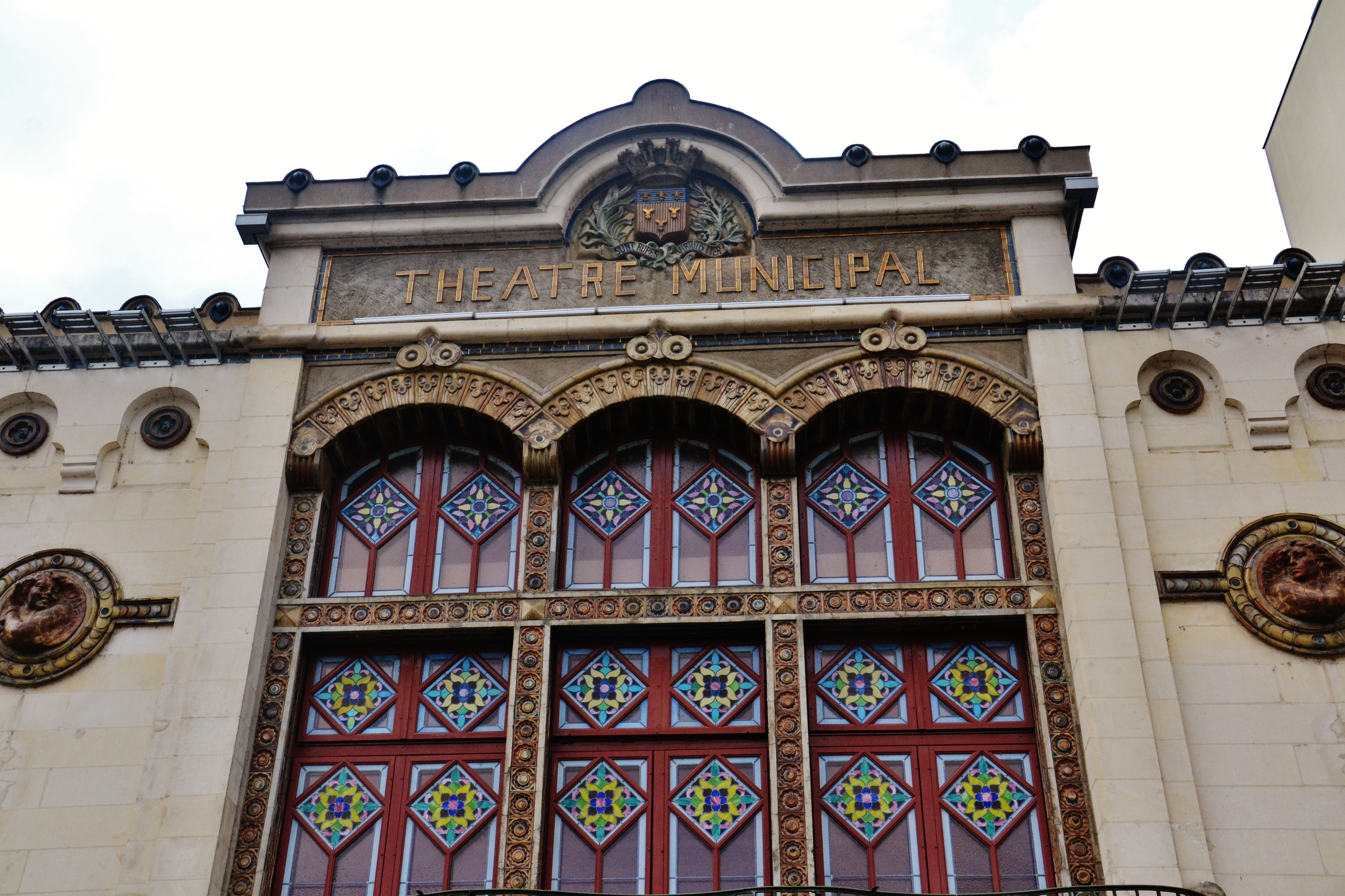
Municipal Théâtre des Sept Collines

=== Arts and festivals ===
- Festival Nuits de Nacre (accordion music) since 1984 with a strong notoriety
- Festival O'les choeurs (music, theater and exhibitions) since 1997
- Festival Du bleu en hiver (jazz, rock and blues music)
- International festival of lace
- Photographic Art Festival

=== Museums ===
- Museum of the Resistance and Deportation
- Museum of Weapons
- Museum of the Accordion

== Twin towns ==
Tulle is twinned with:

- Schorndorf, Germany
- Errenteria, Spain
- Bury, England, United Kingdom
- Lousada, Portugal
- Smolensk, Russia
- Dueville, Italy

== Notable people ==
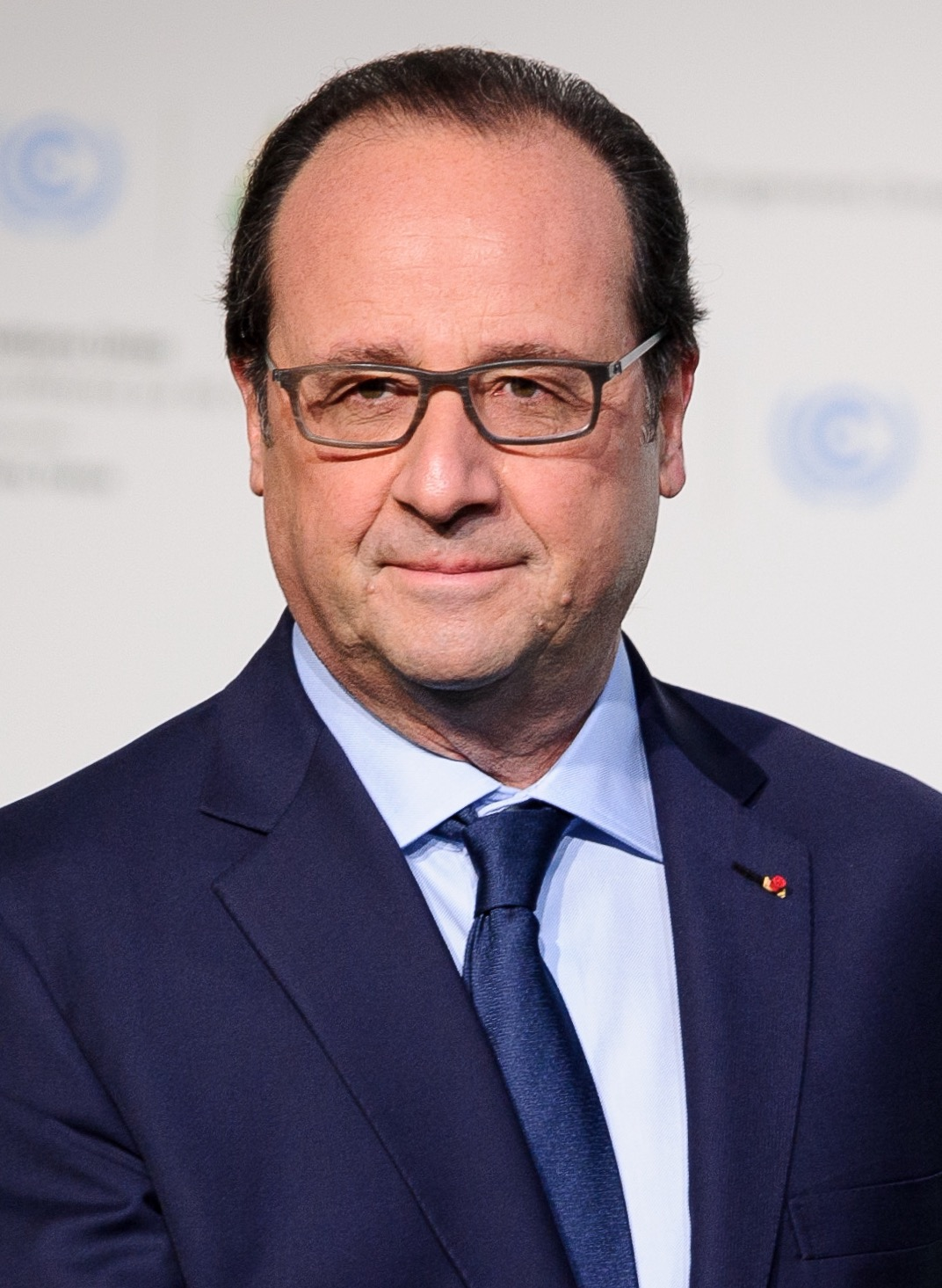
François Hollande

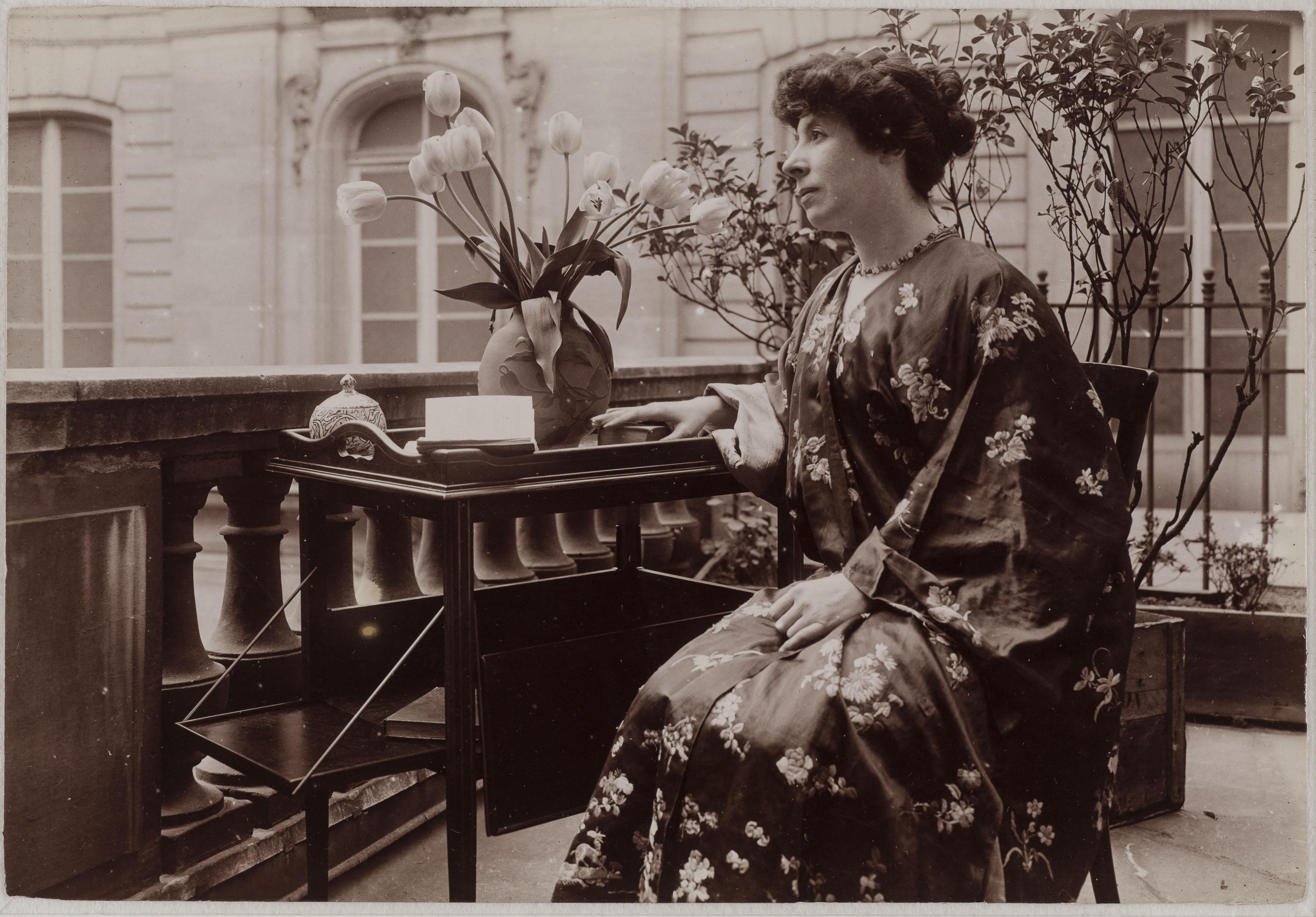
Marcelle Tinayre

Tulle is the birthplace of:

- Laurent Koscielny (b. 1985), football player
- Éric Rohmer (1920–2010), film director
- Marcelle Tinayre (1870–1948), woman of letters
- Alphonse Rebière (1842–1900), science writer
- Edmond Perrier (1844–1921), zoologist and director of the National Museum of Natural History
- Étienne Baluze (1630–1718), scholar
- Jean-François Melon (1675–1738), economist
- Jacques Brival (1751–1820), French Revolutionary
- Thomas Domingo (b. 1985), rugby player
- Léon Eyrolles (1861–1945), politician and entrepreneur
- Charles Silvestre (1889–1948), writer, winner of the Prix Femina in 1926
- Philippe Manoury (b. 1952), composer
- Marie-Anne Montchamp (b. 1957), Secretary of State for Solidarities and Social Cohesion
- Robert Nivelle (1856–1924), Commander-in-Chief of the French army (1916–1917)

The following people have resided in Tulle:

- François Hollande (b. 1954), the former President of France, who was elected during the 2012 French presidential election and who previously served as Mayor of Tulle.
- Benoît Mandelbrot (1924–2010), discoverer of fractals

== See also ==
- Tulle Cathedral
- Communes of the Corrèze department
