= Périgord noir =

- Natural region
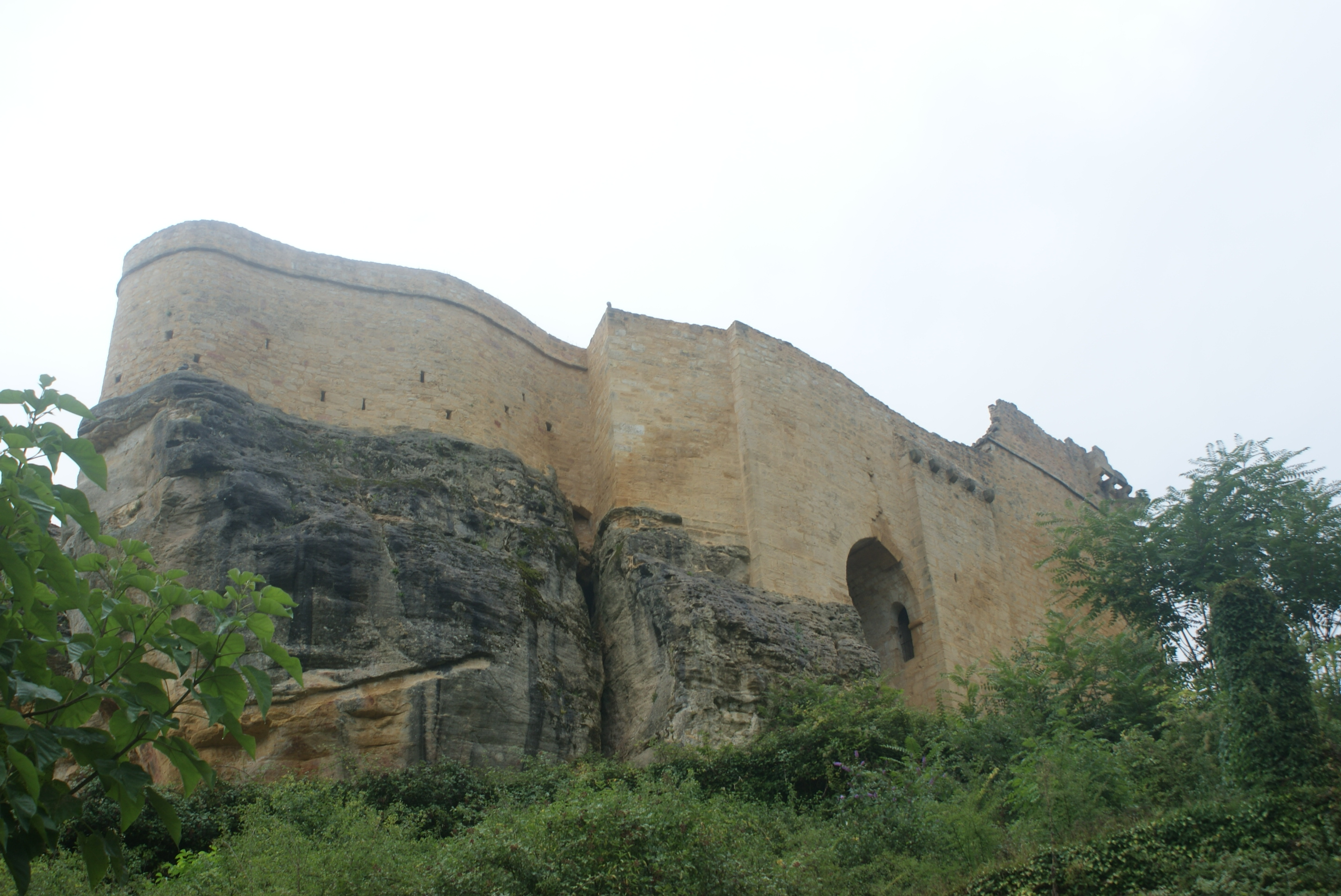
- Remnants of Château de Carlux

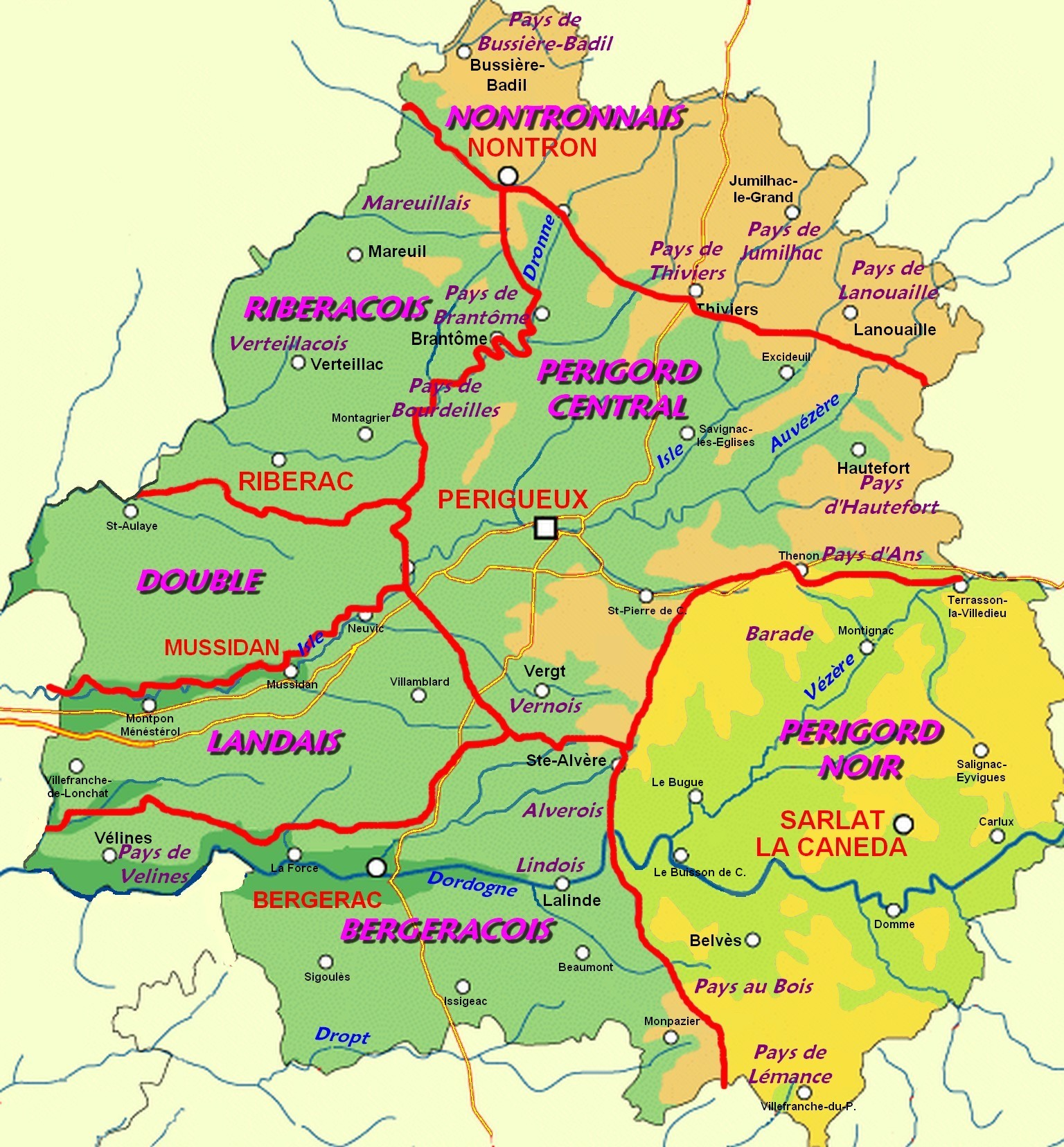
- Position of the Périgord noir (in yellow) within the Dordogne département
- Country: France
- Elevation: 40 m (130 ft)

The Périgord noir (French pronunciation: [peʁiɡɔʁ nwaʁ], lit. 'Black Périgord'), also known as Sarladais, is a traditional natural region of France, which corresponds roughly to the southeast of the current Dordogne département, now forming the eastern part of the Nouvelle-Aquitaine région. It is centered around the town of Sarlat-la-Canéda.

== Etymology ==
The name Périgord noir (black Périgord) is derived from the dark colour of its evergreen oak forests (Quercus ilex) and also from the dark, fertile soil in the Sarladais, not, as is often asserted, from the black truffle. Historically, the Périgord noir was the oldest of the four subdivisions of the Périgord.

== Geography ==
Geographically the Périgord noir takes up the southeast of the Dordogne département.

It is surrounded by the following natural regions:

- Périgord central and Brive basin in the north
- Causse de Martel and Causse de Gramat in the east
- Bouriane in the south
- Haut-Agenais and Bergeracois in the west.

Further natural subdivisions within the Périgord noir are:

- the woodlands of the Barade
- the woodlands of the Bessède
- Pays au Bois
- Pays de Fénelon
- Pays de Lémance

The term Périgord noir has to be clearly distinguished from the similar term Pays du Périgord noir used mainly in tourism. The term Pays du Périgord noir is much broader than Périgord noir, as it includes the Pays d'Hautefort further north, which is normally attributed to the Périgord central.

=== Administration ===
In administrative terms the Périgord noir is covered today mainly by the Arrondissement of Sarlat-la-Canéda.

The following cantons constitute the Périgord noir:

- Canton of Sarlat-la-Canéda
- Canton of Terrasson-Lavilledieu
- Canton of Vallée Dordogne
- Canton of Vallée de l'Homme

The Canton of Haut-Périgord Noir is only partially represented.

== Hydrography ==
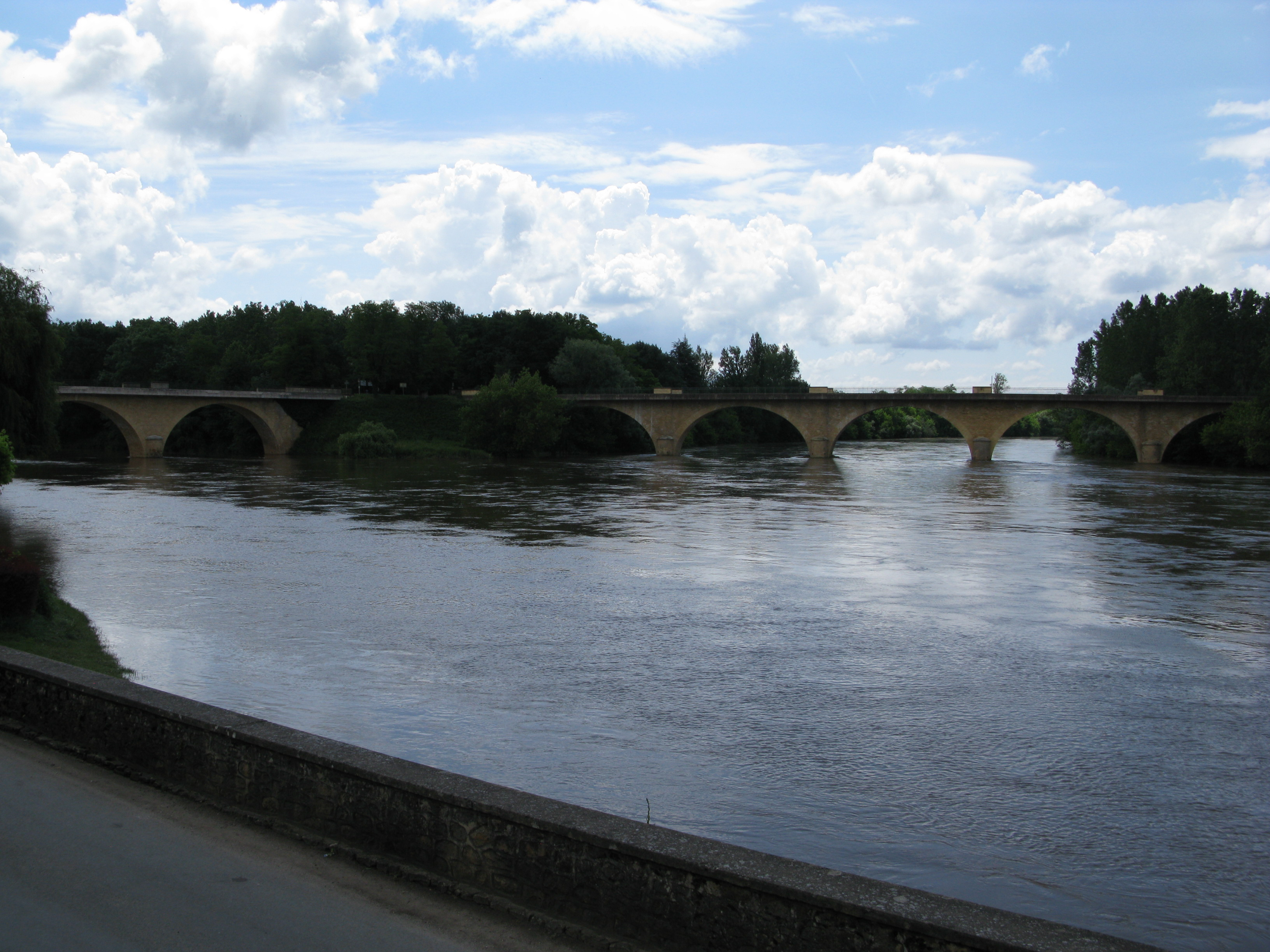
Confluence of the Dordogne (right) and the Vézère (left) near Limeuil

The Dordogne traverses the Périgord noir about centrally from east to west. The Vézère originates to the northeast, traverses the northwestern part of the Périgord noir and joins the Dordogne near Limeuil as a right tributary. Both rivers meander, well known examples for the Dordogne are Cingle de Montfort and Cingle de Trémolat. The base level of both rivers is at an elevation between 70 and 40 meters, whereas the undulating surrounding sedimentary succession can reach elevations of 349 meters — but is situated on average closer to 200 meters. Both streams have therefore incised the sediments by about 150 meters.

Tributaries of the Dordogne are Borrèze, Énéa and Doux (from the right) as well as Marcillande (Germaine), Céou, Nauze and Bélingou (from the left). The Vézère is joined by the Laurence, Thonac, Moustier and Manaurie from the right, and by the Coly and Beune from the left.

== Geology ==
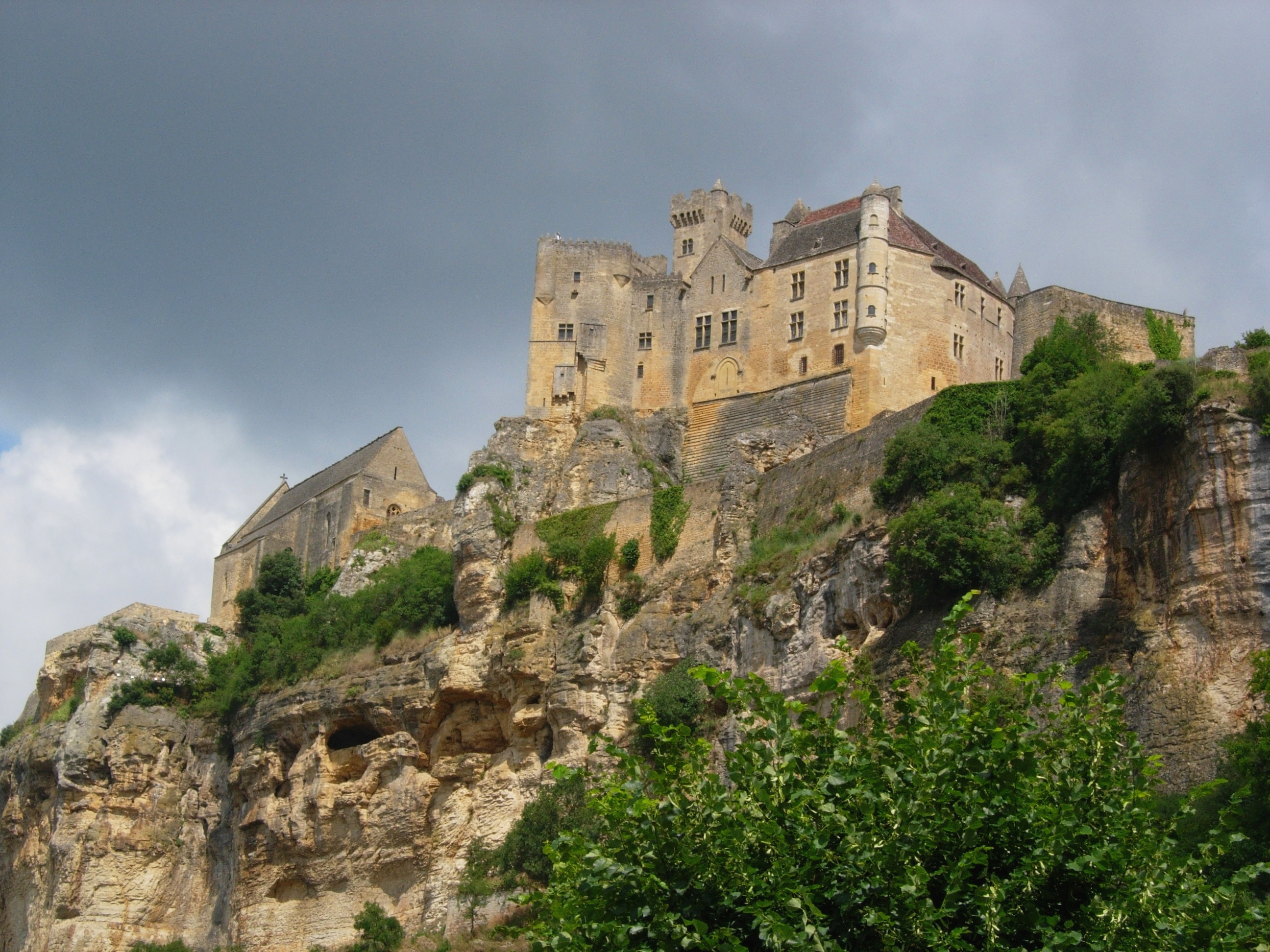
Château de Beynac is built on Upper Coniacian limestone

Geologically, the Périgord noir area is situated entirely in a sequence of gently southwest-dipping sediments that form part of the Aquitaine Basin. The series comprises Jurassic, Cretaceous, Eocene and Oligocene. The river valleys are infilled by alluvial sediments of Quaternary age.

The Jurassic sediments belong to the inner platform facies and consist of limestones, dolomites and marls. The limestones feature micrites, sparites, oolites and also limestones rich in siliciclastics that were deposited near the shoreface. The marls were formed near the continent and are occasionally rather rich in lignite, once mined near Allas-les-Mines. The Jurassic rocks crop out along the northern edge of the Périgord noir near Terrasson-Lavilledieu, where they are separated from the Upper Cretaceous by the southeast-striking Cassagne Fault. They are also found within the Saint-Cyprien Anticline — a southeast-striking tectonic upwarp near Le Bugue and Saint-Cyprien. Beyond the eastern perimeter of the Périgord noir they constitute the Causse de Martel.

The Upper Cretaceous forms a slight discordance with the underlying Middle and Upper Jurassic sediments east of Sarlat. Due to the upwarp of the Saint-Cyprien Anticline the Upper Cretaceous sediments are folded into a very gentle syncline. They mainly consist of limestones and are often karstified. Stratigraphically they range from Cenomanian to Campanian and cover the biggest part of the Périgord noir. In places the Upper Cretaceous is overlain by continental molasse sediments of Eocene and Oligocene age, as can be seen for instance in the woodlands of the Forêt de la Bessède near Le Buisson-de-Cadouin. The molasse are stream and lake deposits.

The northern limit of the Périgord noir is marked by the south-southeast to southeast striking Condat Fault, which has raised a crystalline basement block of the Massif Central — the horst of Châtres — right through the Jurassic sediments.

== History ==
The Périgord noir is well known for its abundance in prehistoric caves and abris like Lascaux, Rouffignac or Cro Magnon — all situated relatively close to Les Eyzies-de-Tayac-Sireuil. Famous are troglodytic cliff dwellings like Roque Saint-Christophe near the archeological site of Le Moustier. Archeological studies have been conducted in the Périgord noir since the 19th century and underline the importance of the Vézère valley for prehistory. Just in the vicinity of Les Eyzies 147 sites are clustered, with ages reaching 40.000 years and more. This is the reason, why the new Musée national de Préhistoire was established there. Several prehistoric sites in the Périgord noir have rendered their names for archeological cultures like Mousterian, Micoquian, Périgordian and Magdalenian.

Besides the medieval towns Sarlat and Domme many classified settlements are preserved. Examples are Belvès, Beynac, Castelnaud-la-Chapelle, Limeuil, La Roque-Gageac, Saint-Amand-de-Coly and Saint-Léon-sur-Vézère. The rich cultural heritage of the Périgord noir is also manifested in many castles, châteaus, churches and abbeys, like for instance Château de Beynac, Château de Castelnaud-la-Chapelle, Château des Milandes, the church Saint-Martin de Besse and Cadouin Abbey.

During the Hundred Years War (1337 till 1453) the Périgord noir witnessed many battles between the English and French kings and the region was devastated several times. A good example is the Château de Carlux which was under attack several times and finally got burnt down by the English in 1406. The population was diminished severely during the war and despite attempts in the 15th and 16th century to revitalize the economy again the region never fully recovered and kept suffering from the sequels of the war.

The French Wars of Religion (1562 till 1598) have also left their marks on the Périgord noir.

== Gallery ==
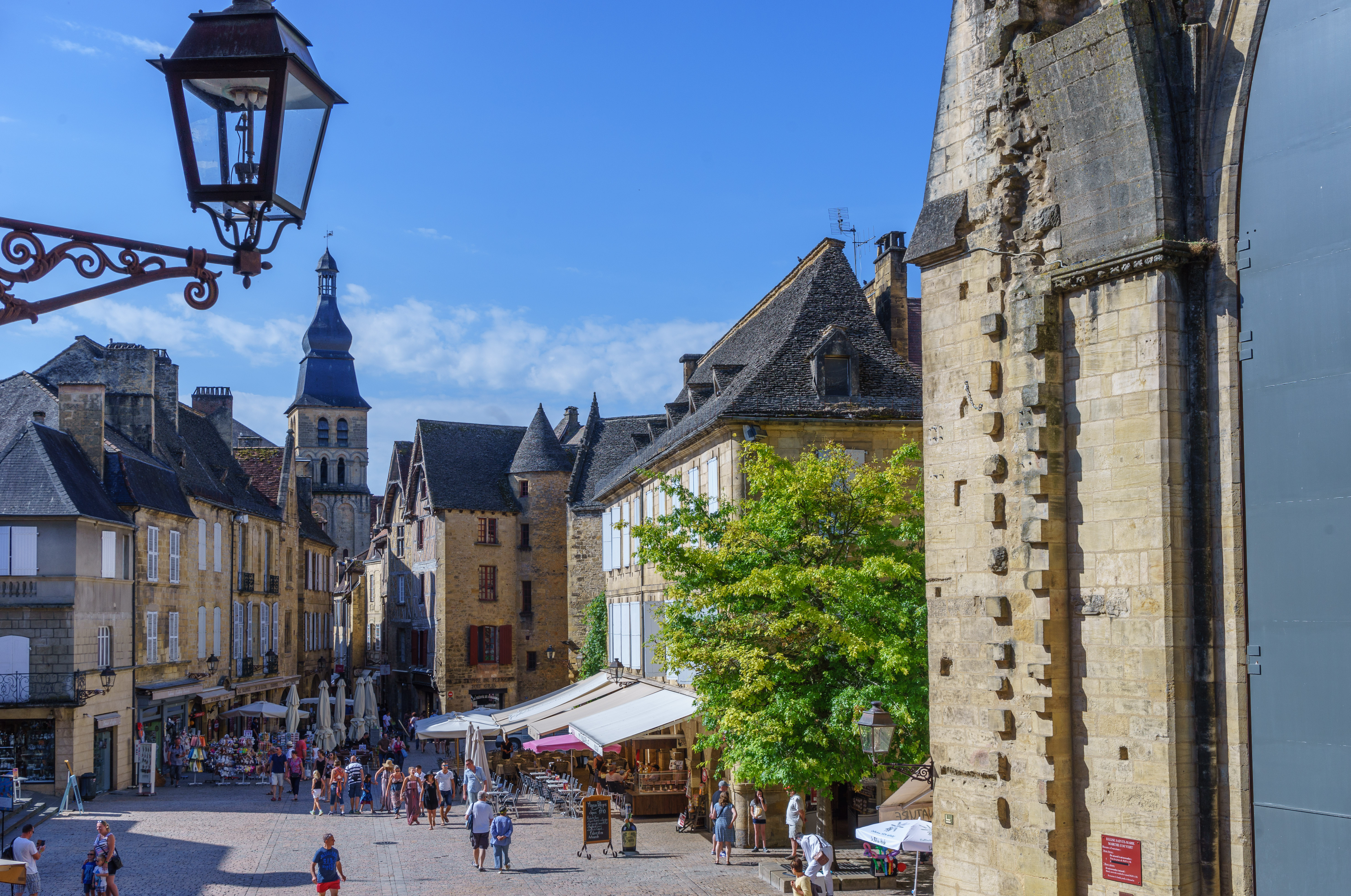
Sarlat-la-Canéda

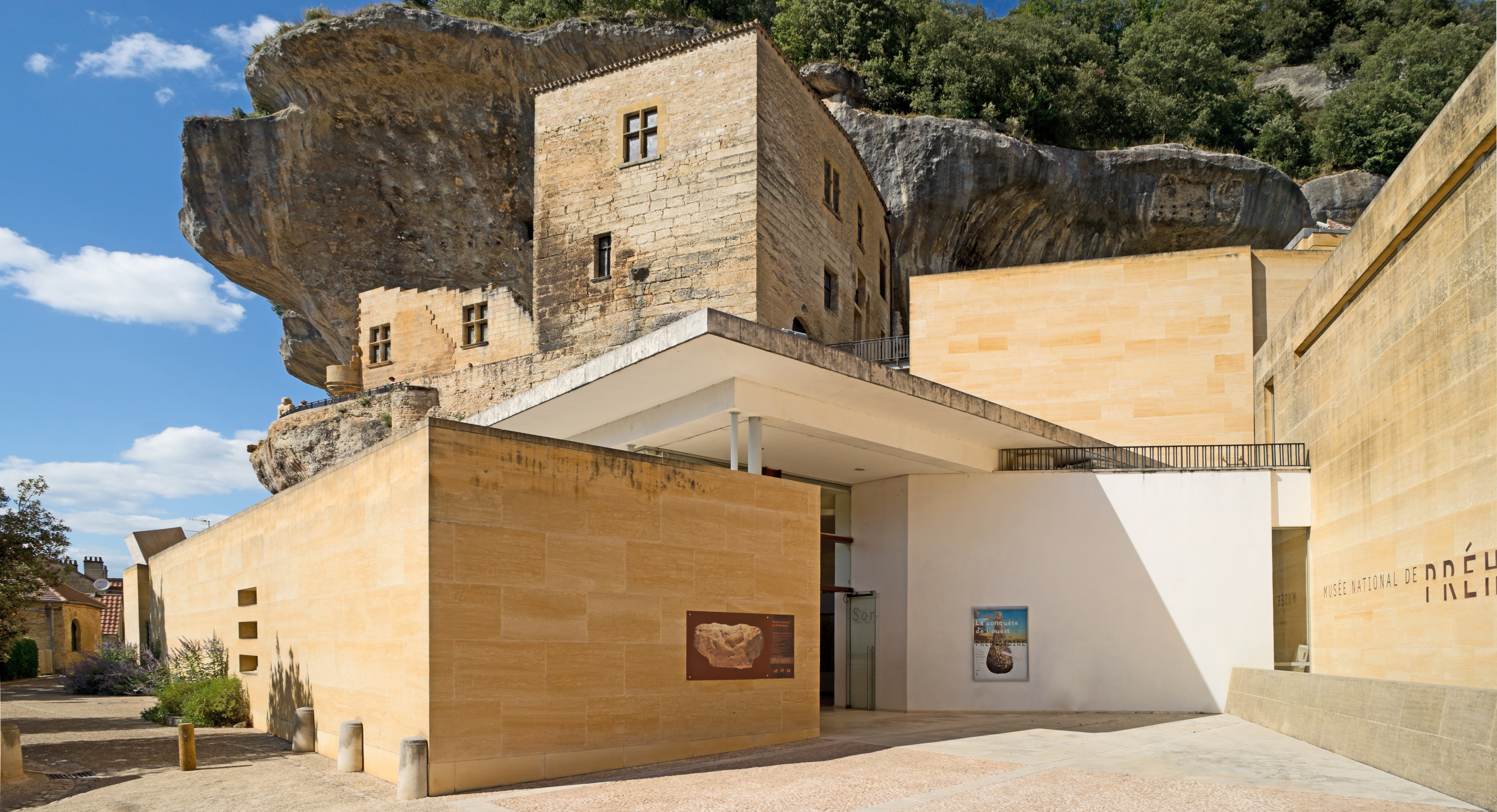
Musée national de Préhistoire in Les Eyzies-de-Tayac-Sireuil

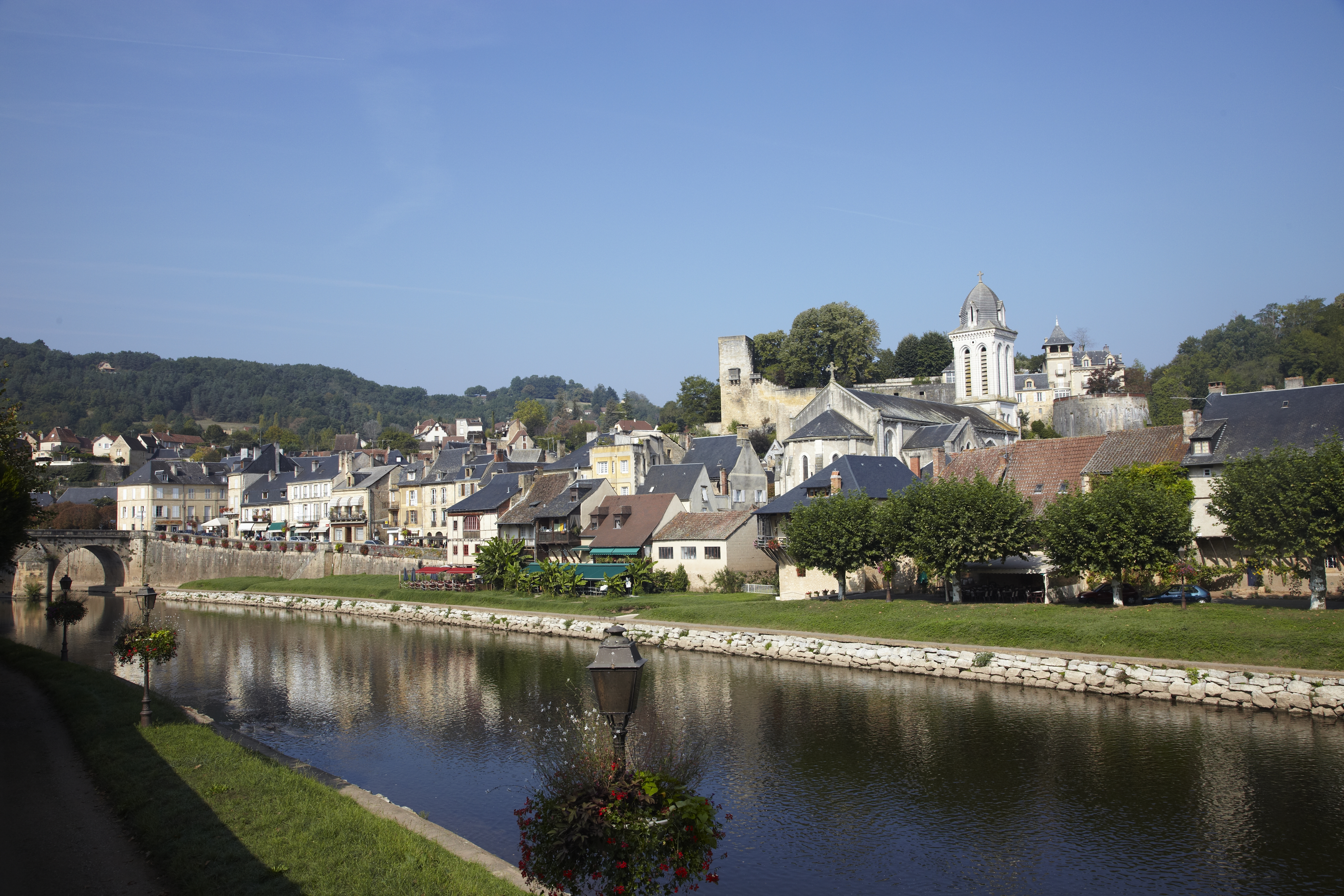
Montignac and the Vézère

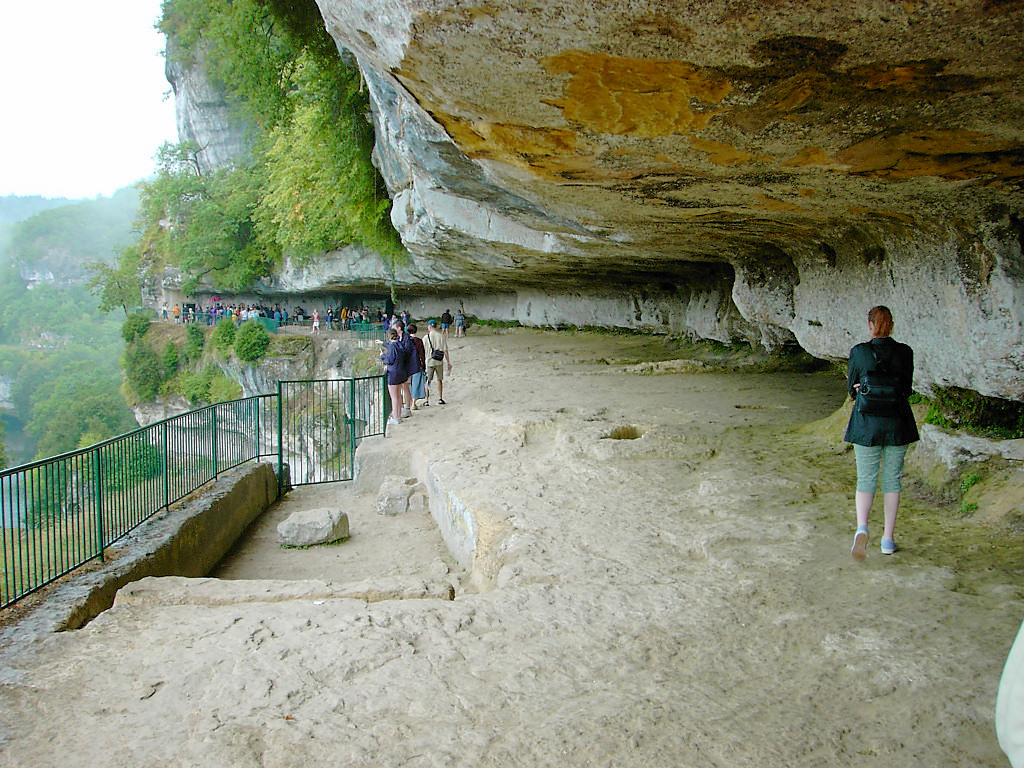
Abri Roque Saint Christophe in Peyzac-le-Moustier

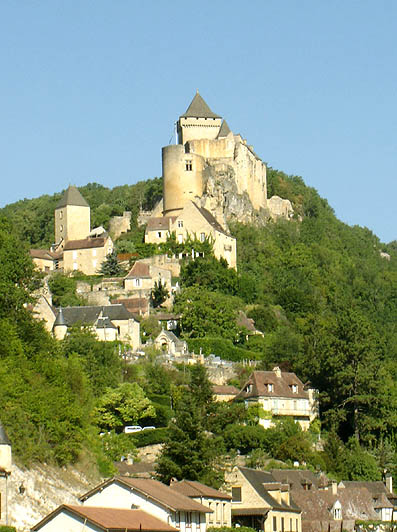
Château de Castelnaud

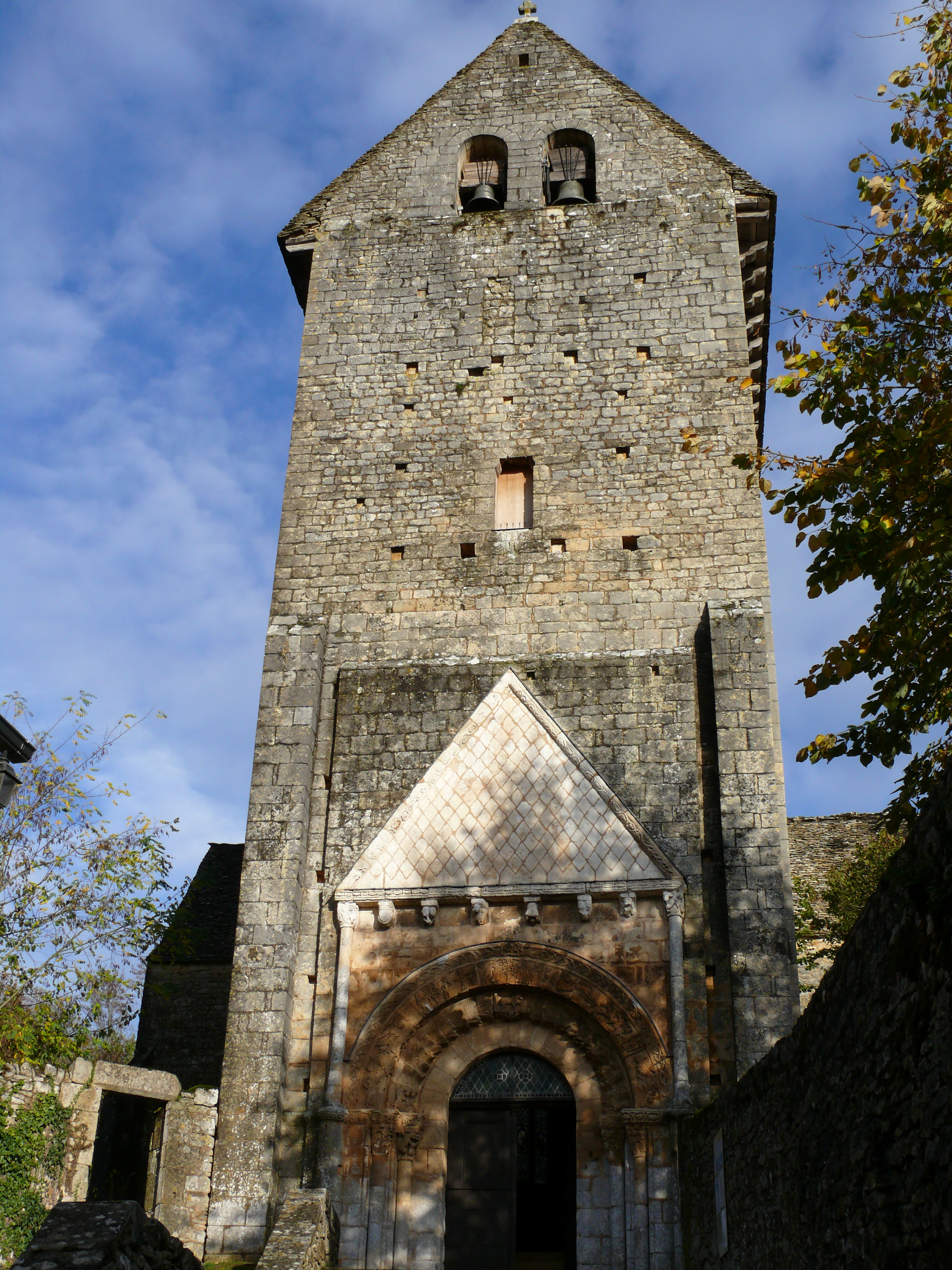
Church Saint-Martin in Besse

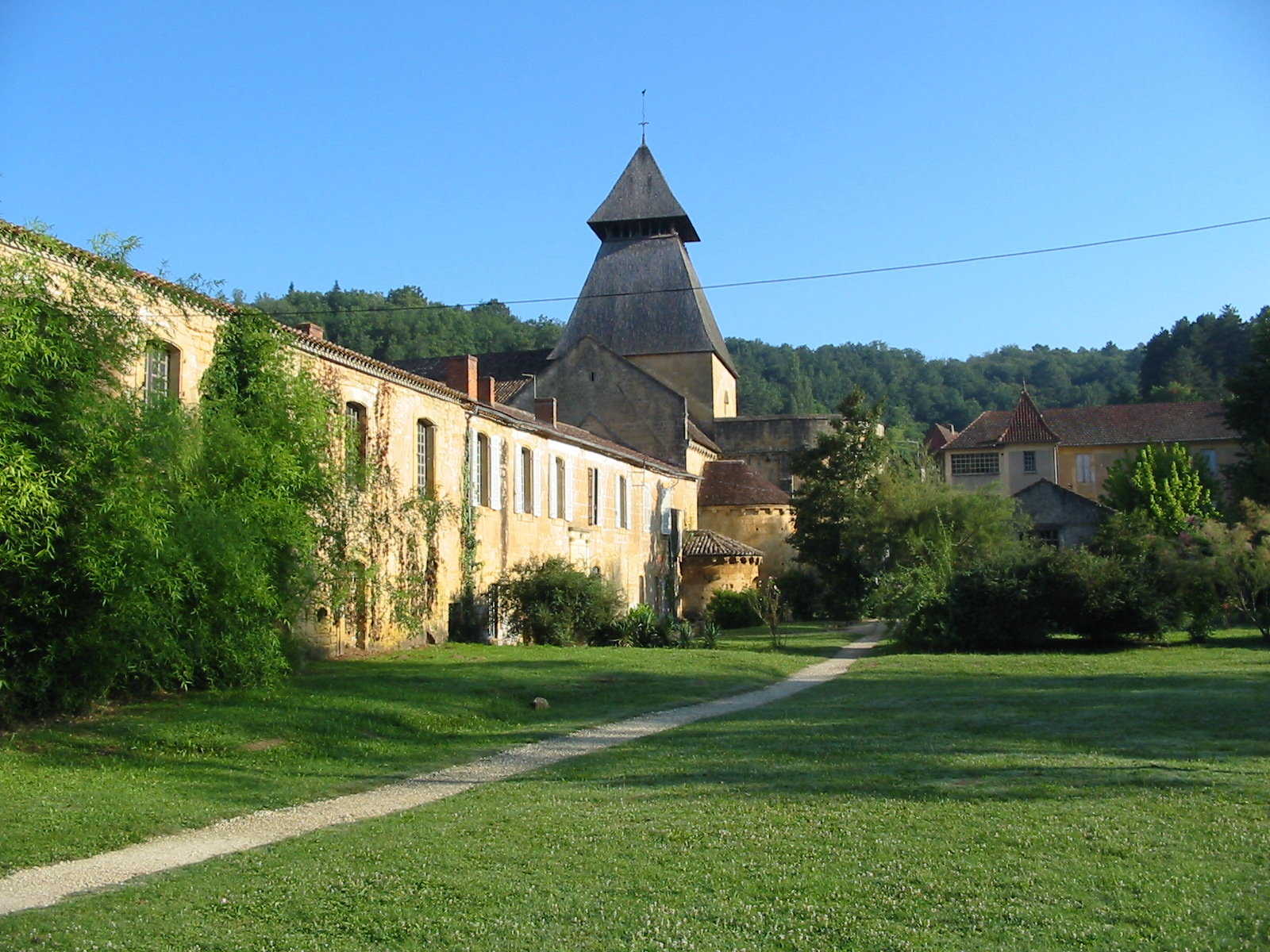
Cadouin Abbey

== See also ==
- Périgord
- Arrondissement of Sarlat-la-Canéda
