= Sarladais =

Sarladais or Sarladés may refer to:

- Sarladais, the inhabitants of Sarlat-la-Canéda
- Sarladais (subdialect), a variety of the Languedocien dialect of Occitan
- Sarladais, another name for the Périgord noir, the region around Sarlat-la-Canéda
