= Beynac-et-Cazenac =

- Commune
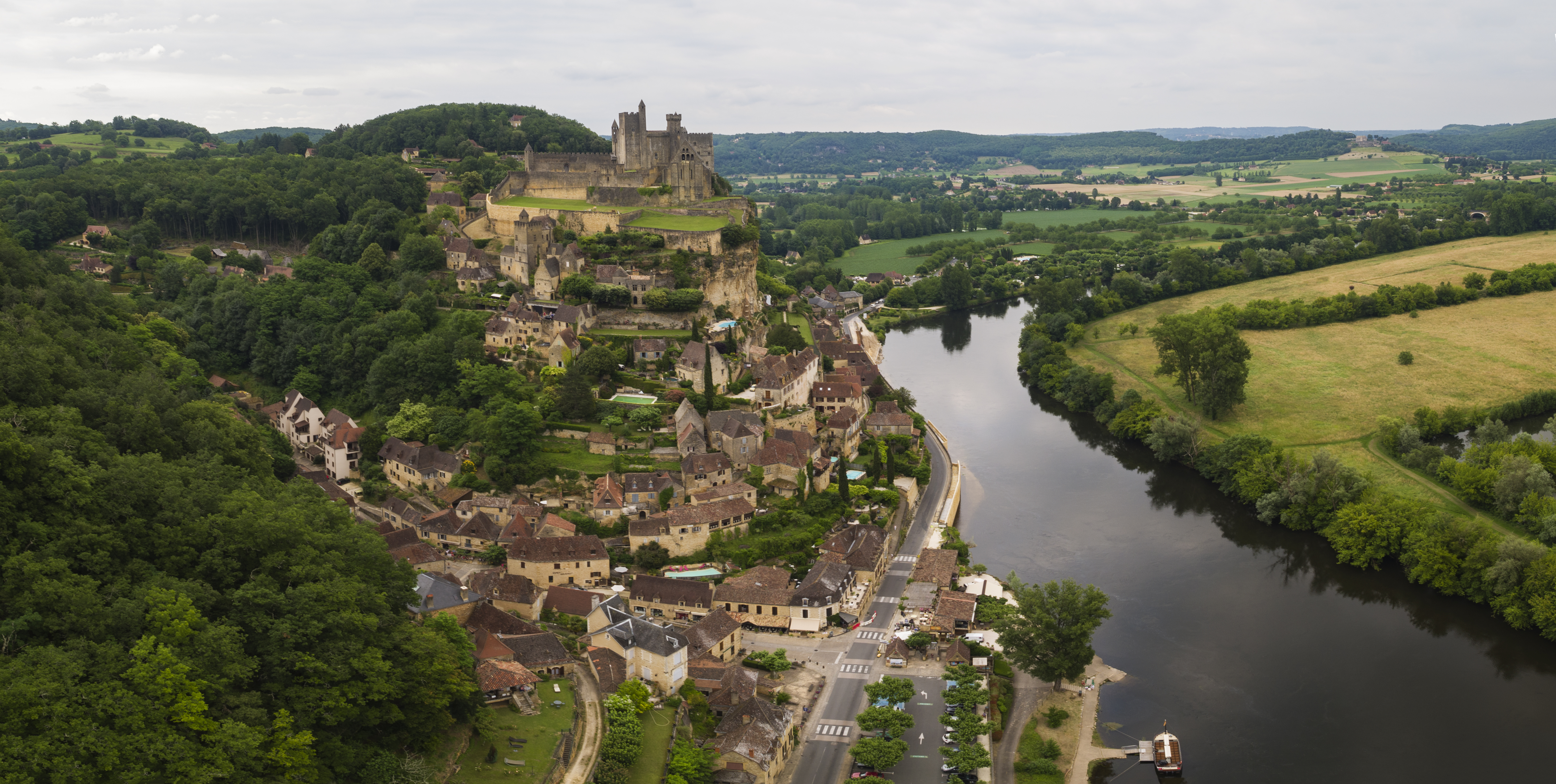
- Beynac and its château by the river Dordogne

- Coat of arms
- Location of Beynac-et-Cazenac
- Location within France Location within Nouvelle-Aquitaine
- Coordinates: 44°50′28″N 1°08′41″E
- Country: France
- Region: Nouvelle-Aquitaine
- Department: Dordogne
- Arrondissement: Sarlat-la-Canéda
- Canton: Sarlat-la-Canéda

Government
  - Mayor (2020–2026): Serge Parre
- Area^{1}: 12.74 km^{2} (4.92 sq mi)
- Highest elevation: 288 m (945 ft)
- Lowest elevation: 53 m (174 ft)
- Population (2023): 397
  - Density: 31.2/km^{2} (80.7/sq mi)
- Time zone: UTC+01:00 (CET)
  - Summer (DST): UTC+02:00 (CEST)
- INSEE/Postal code: 24040 /24220
- ^{1} French Land Register data, which excludes lakes, ponds, glaciers > 1 km^{2} (0.386 sq mi or 247 acres) and river estuaries.

Beynac-et-Cazenac (French pronunciation: [bɛnak e kaznak]; Occitan: Bainac e Casenac) is a village located in the Dordogne department in southwestern France.

The medieval Château de Beynac is located in the commune.

The village is classified as one of Les plus beaux villages de France (most beautiful villages of France).

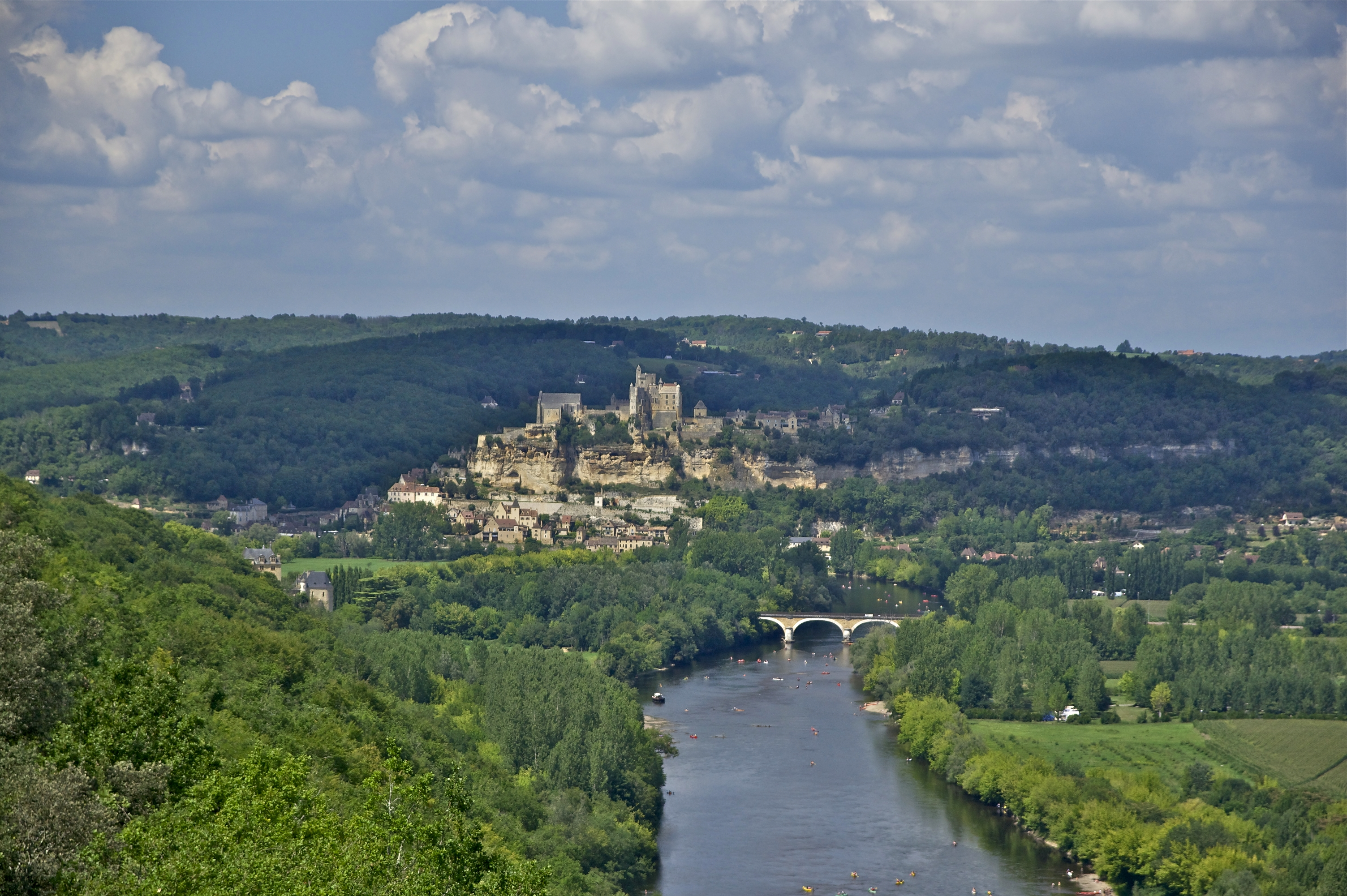
Beynac viewed from the Château de Castelnaud.

== Geography ==
The commune lies on the banks of the river Dordogne 10 km (6.2 mi) southwest of Sarlat-la-Canéda.

== History ==
Historically the first mention of Beynac dates to 1115 when Maynard de Beynac made a gift to the sisters at Fontevrault Abbey. Simon de Montfort seized the château at the end of the 12th century, but the people of Beynac recovered their château thanks to the intervention of Philippe Auguste in 1217. The château stayed in possession of the family de Beynac until 1753 when the de Beynac family became extinct in male line with Pierre last marquis of Beynac who married in 1727 Anne-Marie Boucher and had two daughters: Julie de Beynac, married to the marquis de Castelnau, and Claude-Marie de Beynac, married in 1761 to Christophe Marie de Beaumont du Repaire. The family de Beaumont du Repaire added "Beynac" to its name and took the courtesy title of "marquis de Beaumont-Beynac" One of the descendants sold the château in 1961.

In 1827, the communes of Beynac and Cazenac were merged under the current name.

== Population ==
Historical population
Year	Pop.	±% p.a.
1968	410	—
1975	411	+0.03%
1982	460	+1.62%
1990	498	+1.00%
1999	506	+0.18%
2007	511	+0.12%
2012	552	+1.56%
2017	547	−0.18%
2023	397	−5.20%
Source: INSEE

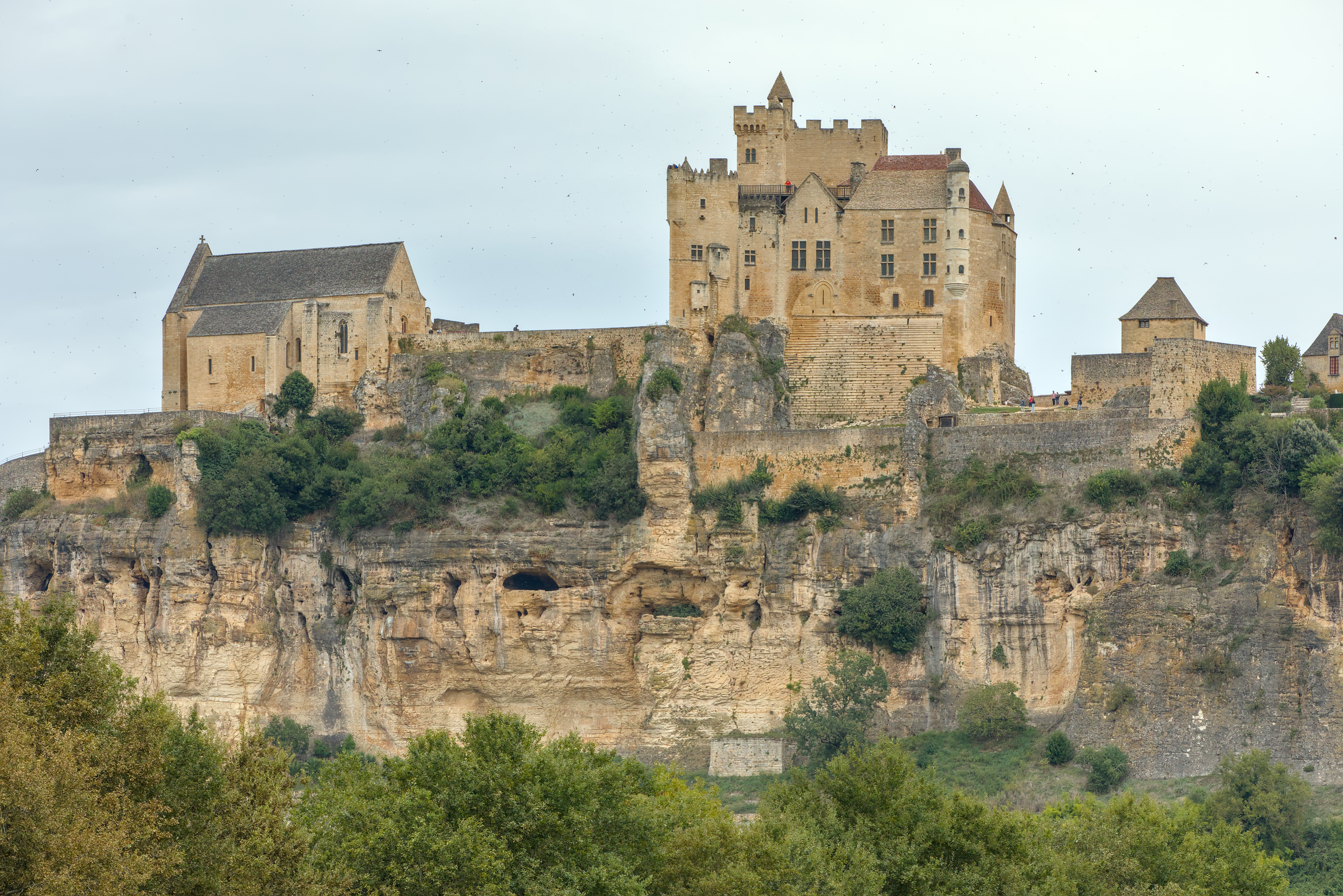
View from the South

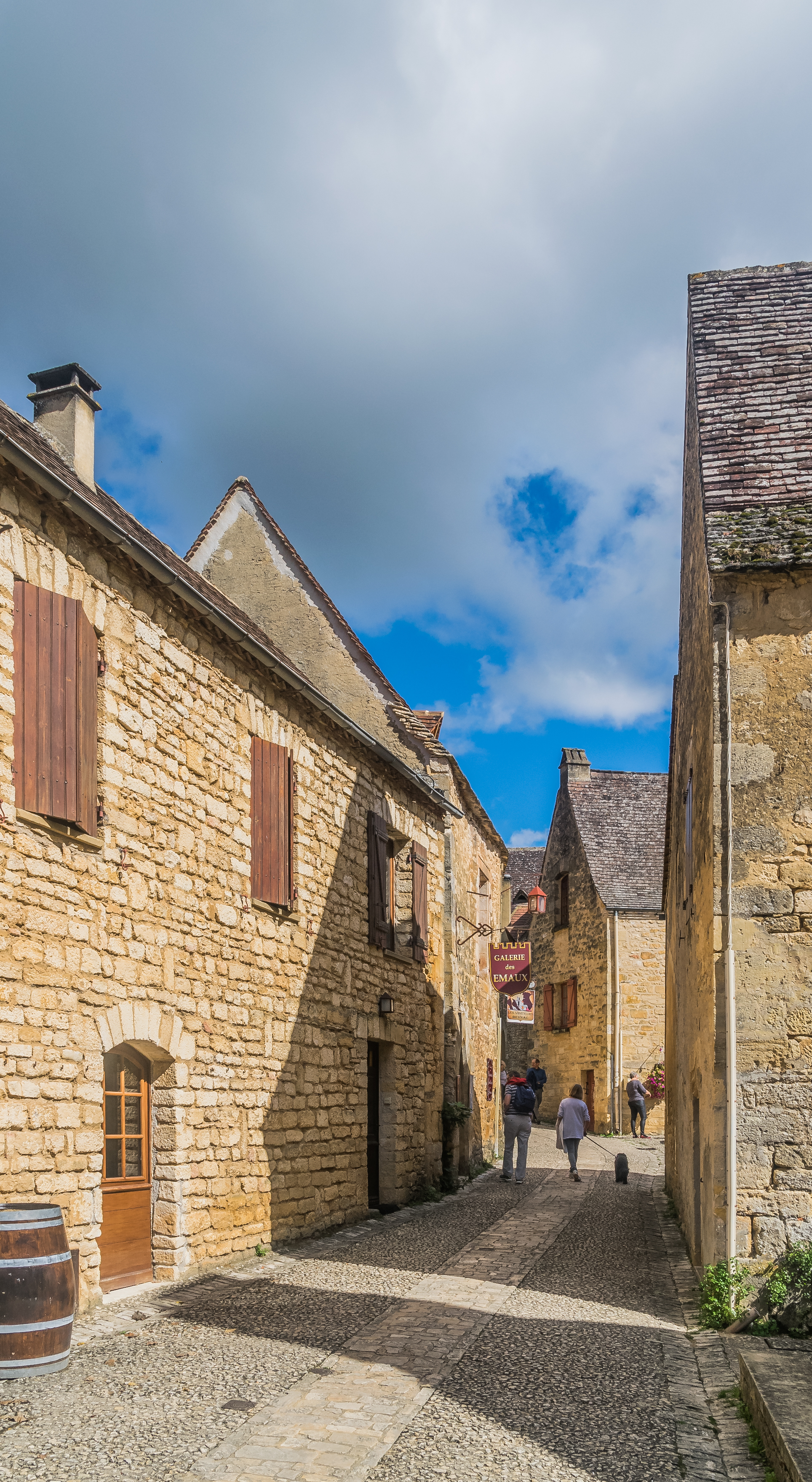
A little street in the village

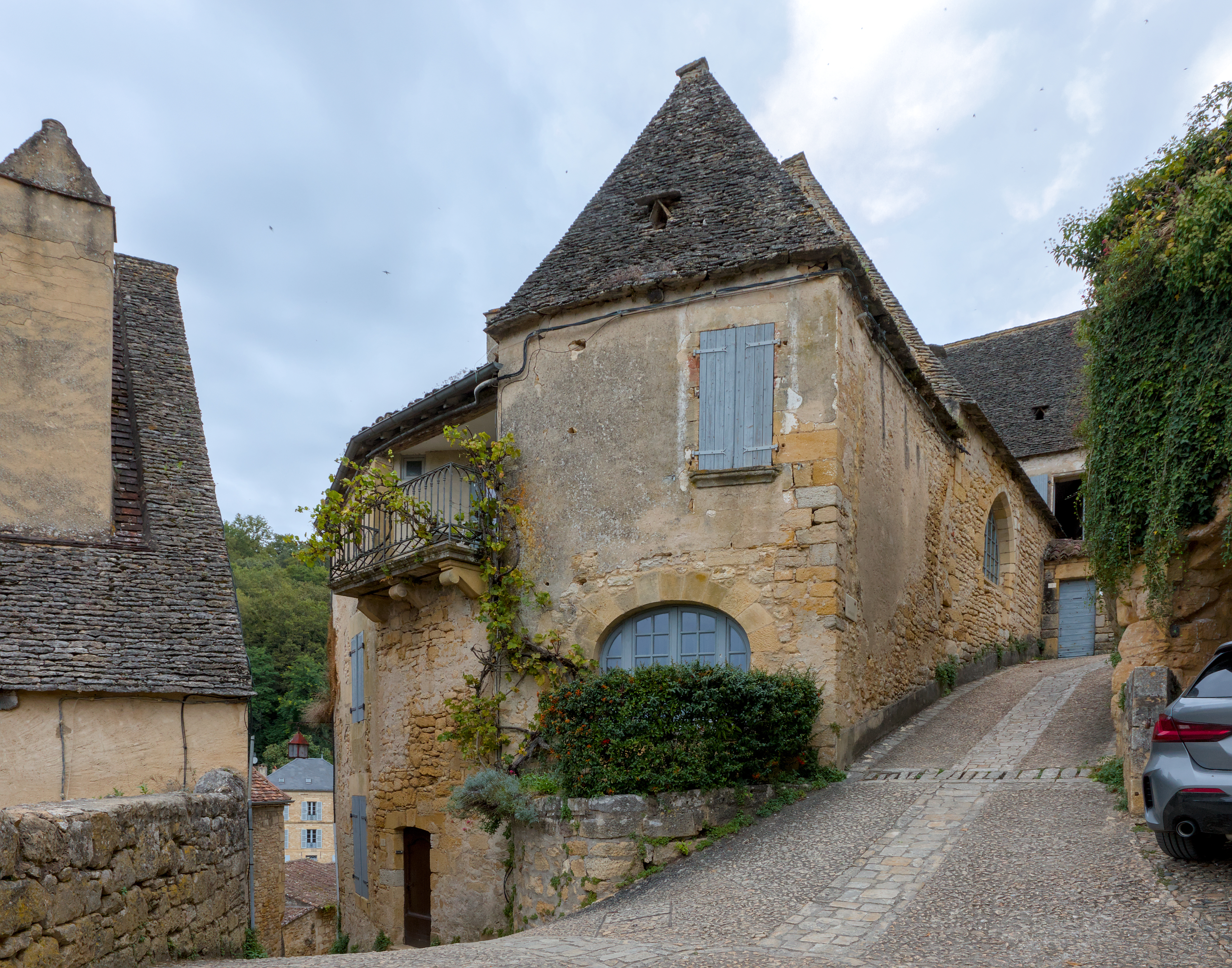
Another street

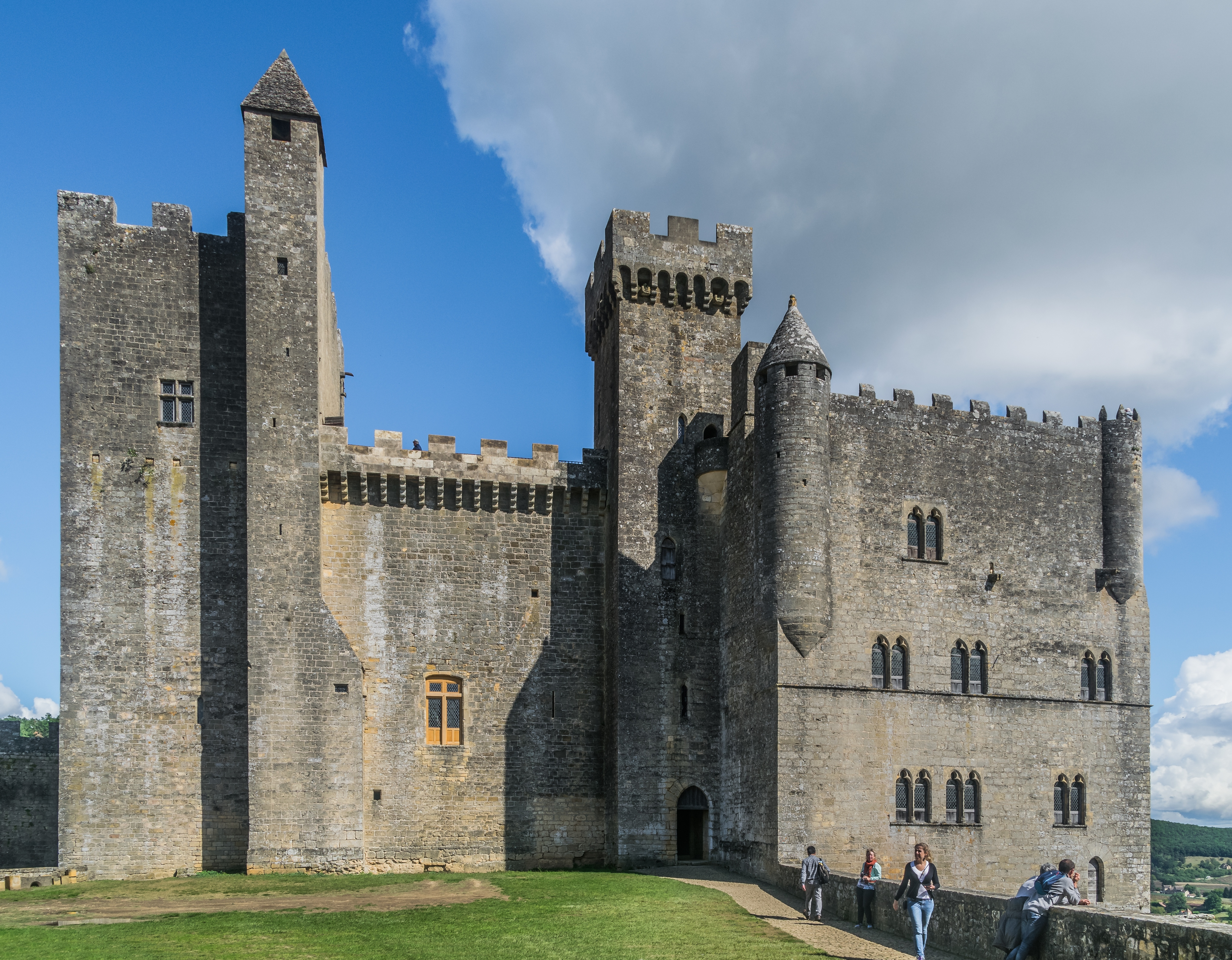
The castle

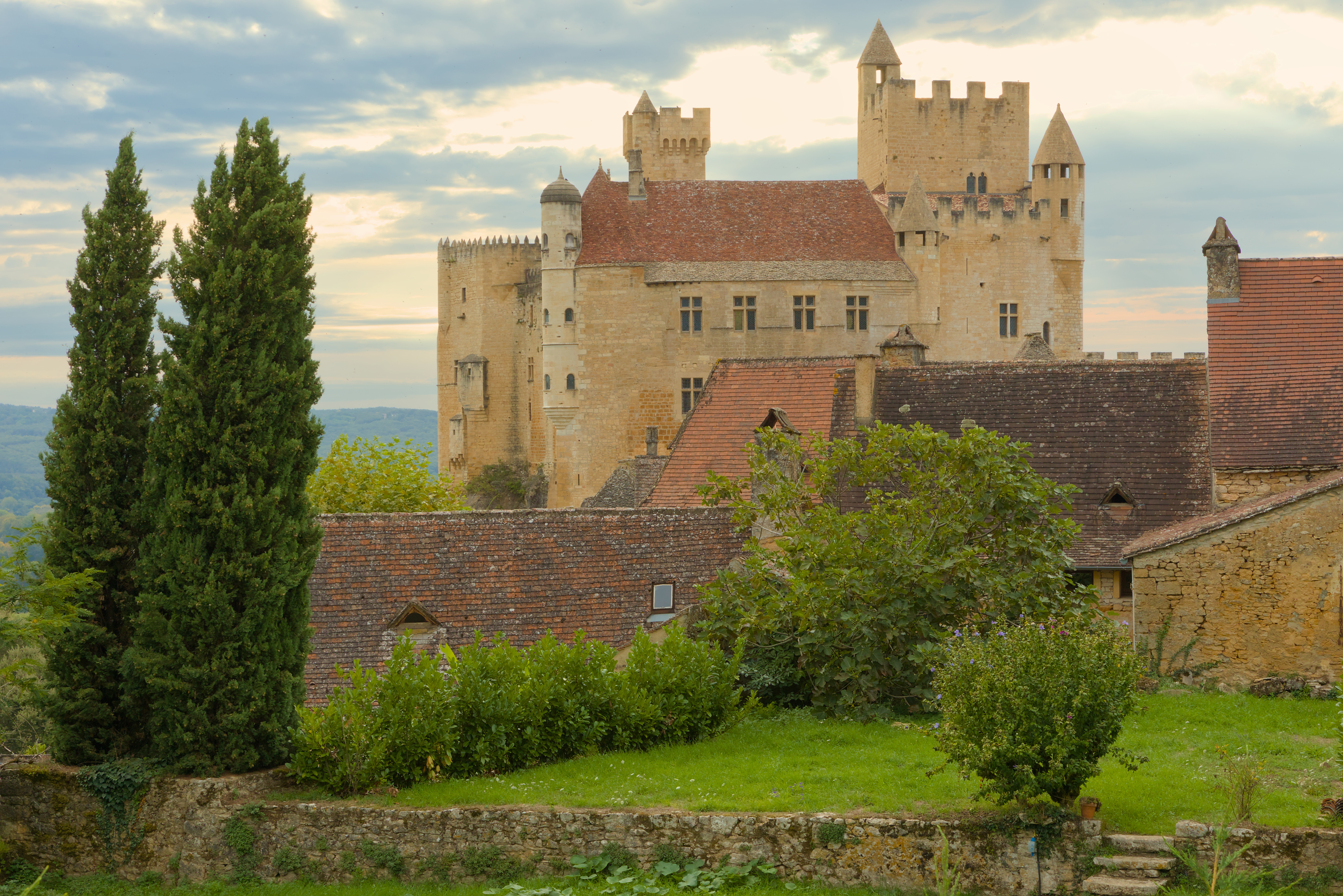
View of the castle in late afternoon

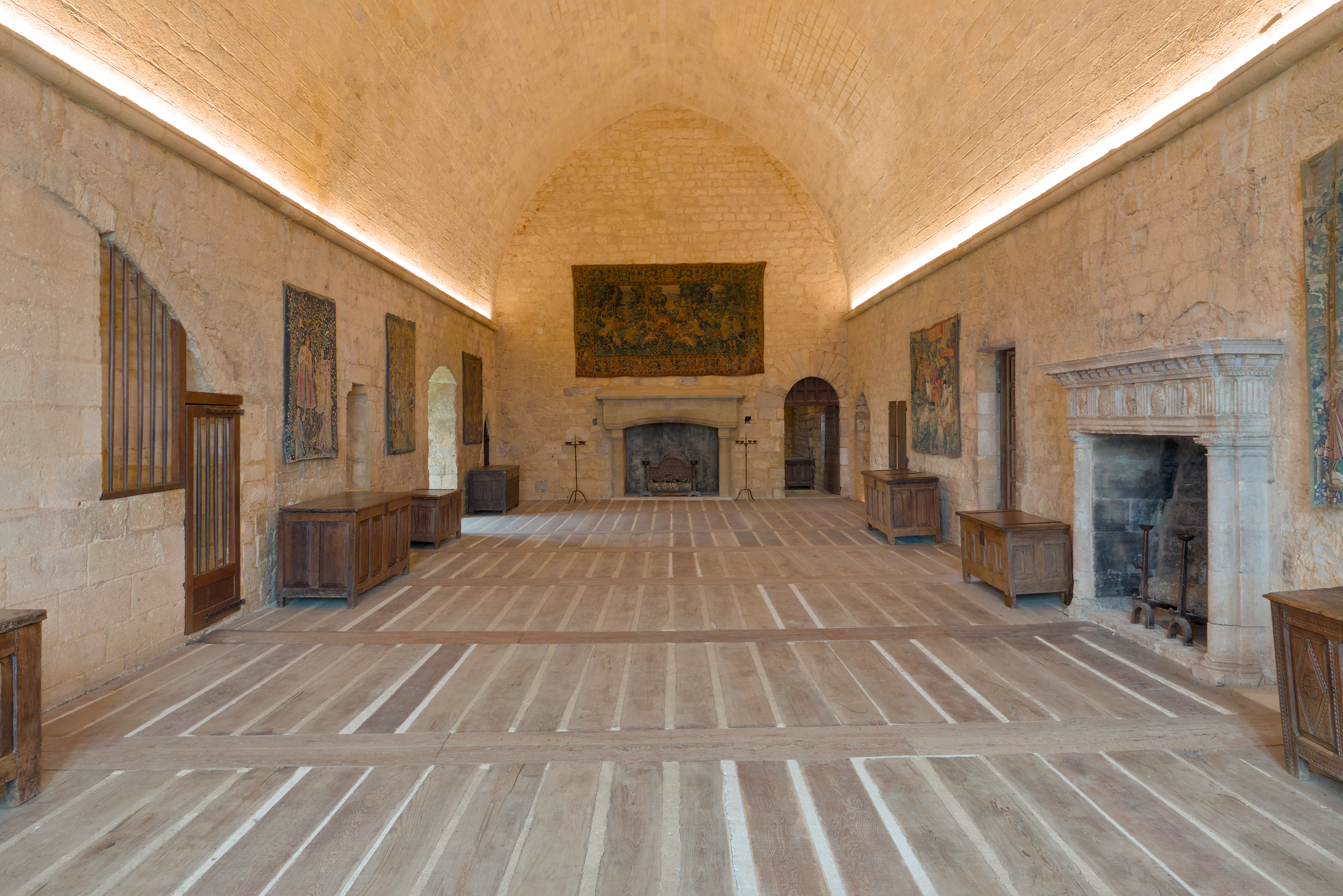
Inside the castle – Périgord States' Hall

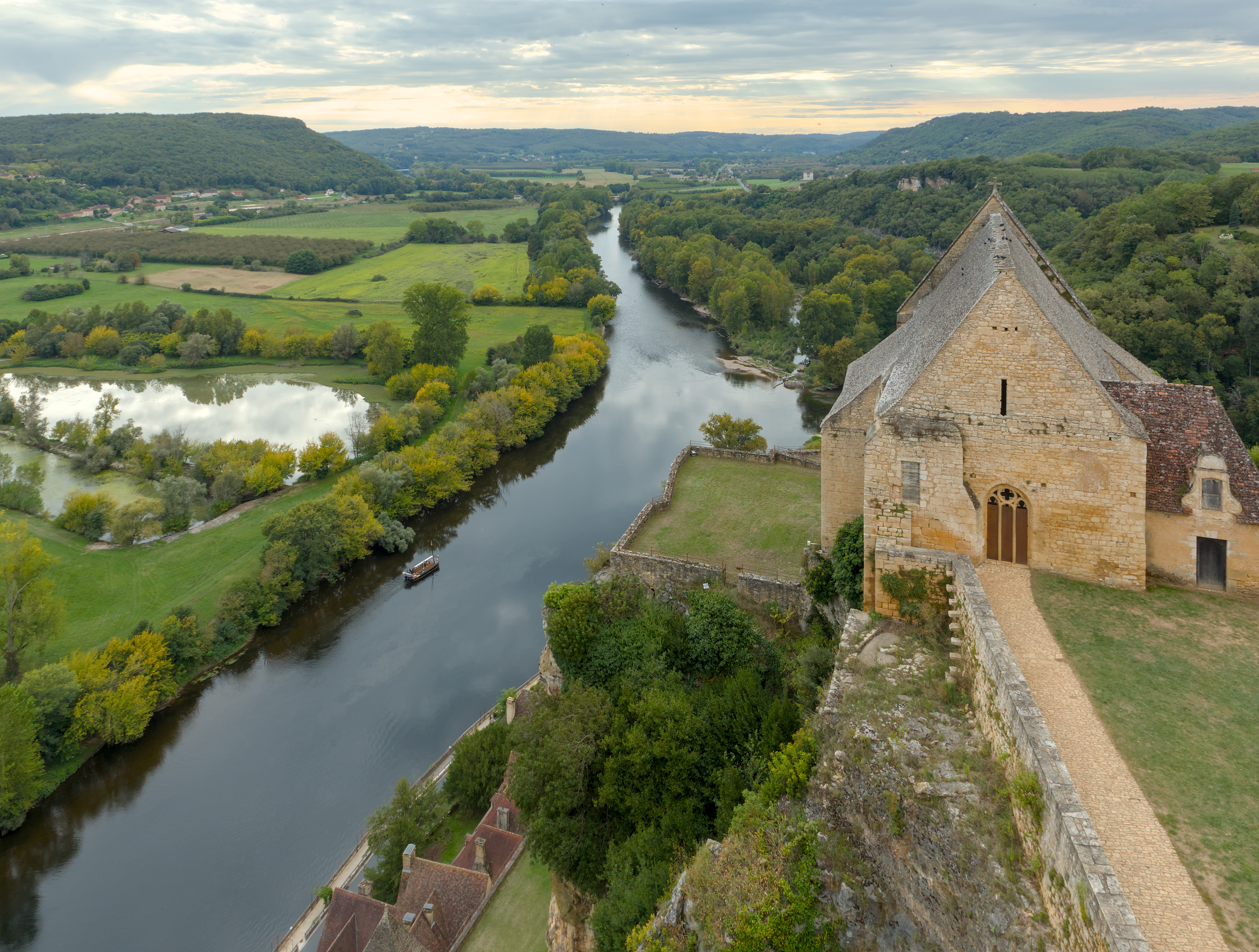
View of river Dordogne from the castle

== See also ==
- Communes of the Dordogne département
