= Castelnaud-la-Chapelle =

- Commune
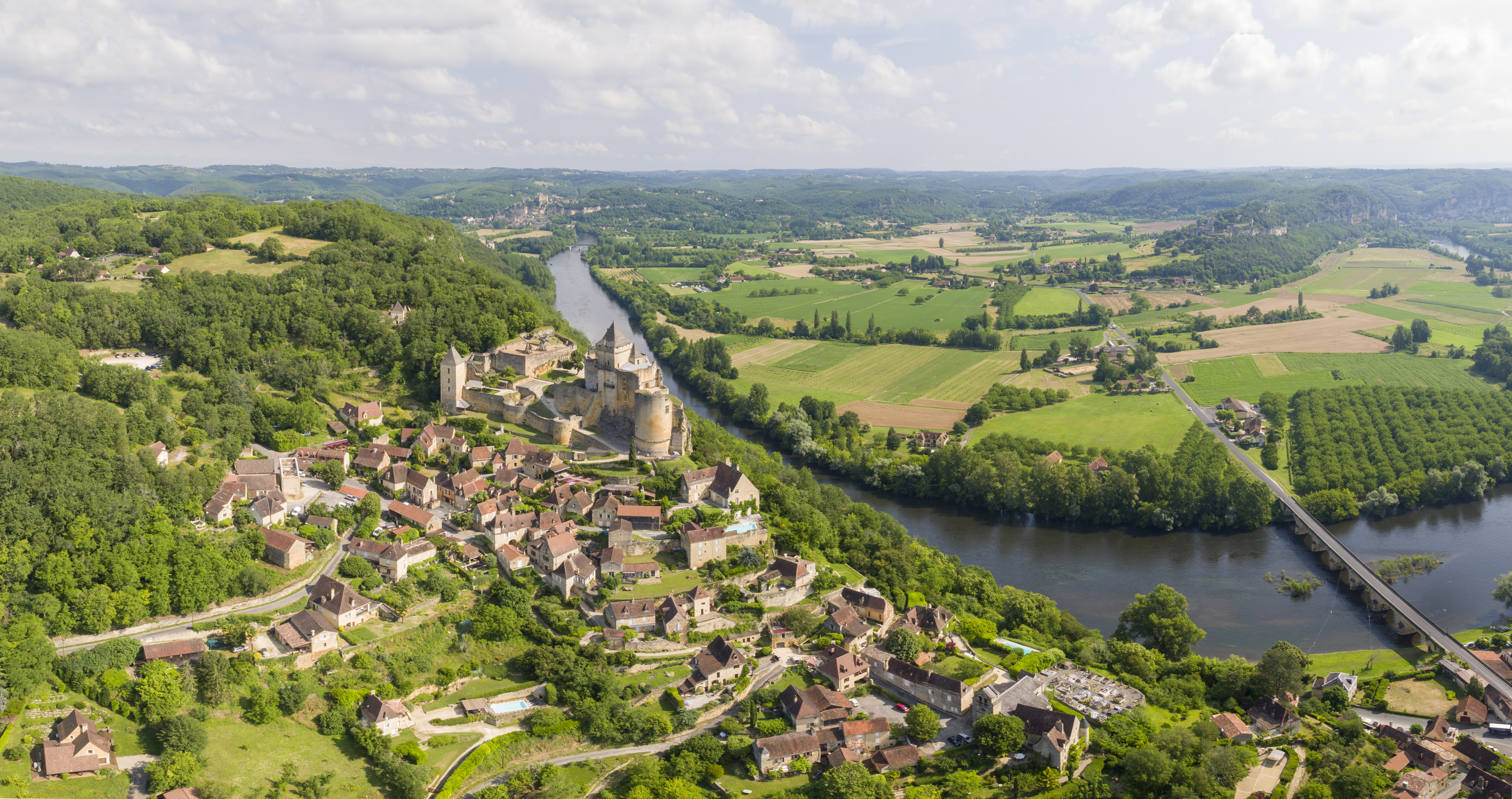
- View of Castelnaud-la-Chapelle and its castle
- Location of Castelnaud-la-Chapelle
- Location within France Location within Nouvelle-Aquitaine
- Coordinates: 44°48′57″N 1°08′58″E
- Country: France
- Region: Nouvelle-Aquitaine
- Department: Dordogne
- Arrondissement: Sarlat-la-Canéda
- Canton: Vallée Dordogne

Government
  - Mayor (2020–2026): Daniel Dejean
- Area^{1}: 20.88 km^{2} (8.06 sq mi)
- Elevation: 71 m (233 ft)
- Highest elevation: 283 m (928 ft)
- Lowest elevation: 51 m (167 ft)
- Population (2023): 451
  - Density: 21.6/km^{2} (55.9/sq mi)
- Time zone: UTC+01:00 (CET)
  - Summer (DST): UTC+02:00 (CEST)
- INSEE/Postal code: 24086 /24250
- ^{1} French Land Register data, which excludes lakes, ponds, glaciers > 1 km^{2} (0.386 sq mi or 247 acres) and river estuaries.

Castelnaud-la-Chapelle (French pronunciation: [kastɛlno la ʃapɛl]; Occitan: Castelnòu e La Capèla) is a commune in the Dordogne department in Nouvelle-Aquitaine in southwestern France. It was created in 1973 by the merger of two former communes: Castelnaud-Fayrac and La Chapelle-Péchaud. It is a member of Les Plus Beaux Villages de France (The Most Beautiful Villages of France).

The Château de Castelnaud-la-Chapelle is located in the commune.

== Geography ==
The river Céou flows northward through the western part of the commune, then flows into the Dordogne, which forms all of the commune's northern border.

The village is located above the confluence of the two rivers.

== Population ==
Historical population
Year	Pop.	±% p.a.
1968	440	—
1975	380	−2.07%
1982	374	−0.23%
1990	408	+1.09%
1999	426	+0.48%
2007	461	+0.99%
2012	472	+0.47%
2017	457	−0.64%
2023	451	−0.22%
Source: INSEE

== See also ==
- Communes of the Dordogne department
