= Château de Beynac =

Castle in southern France

Coordinates: 44°50′26″N 1°08′48″E

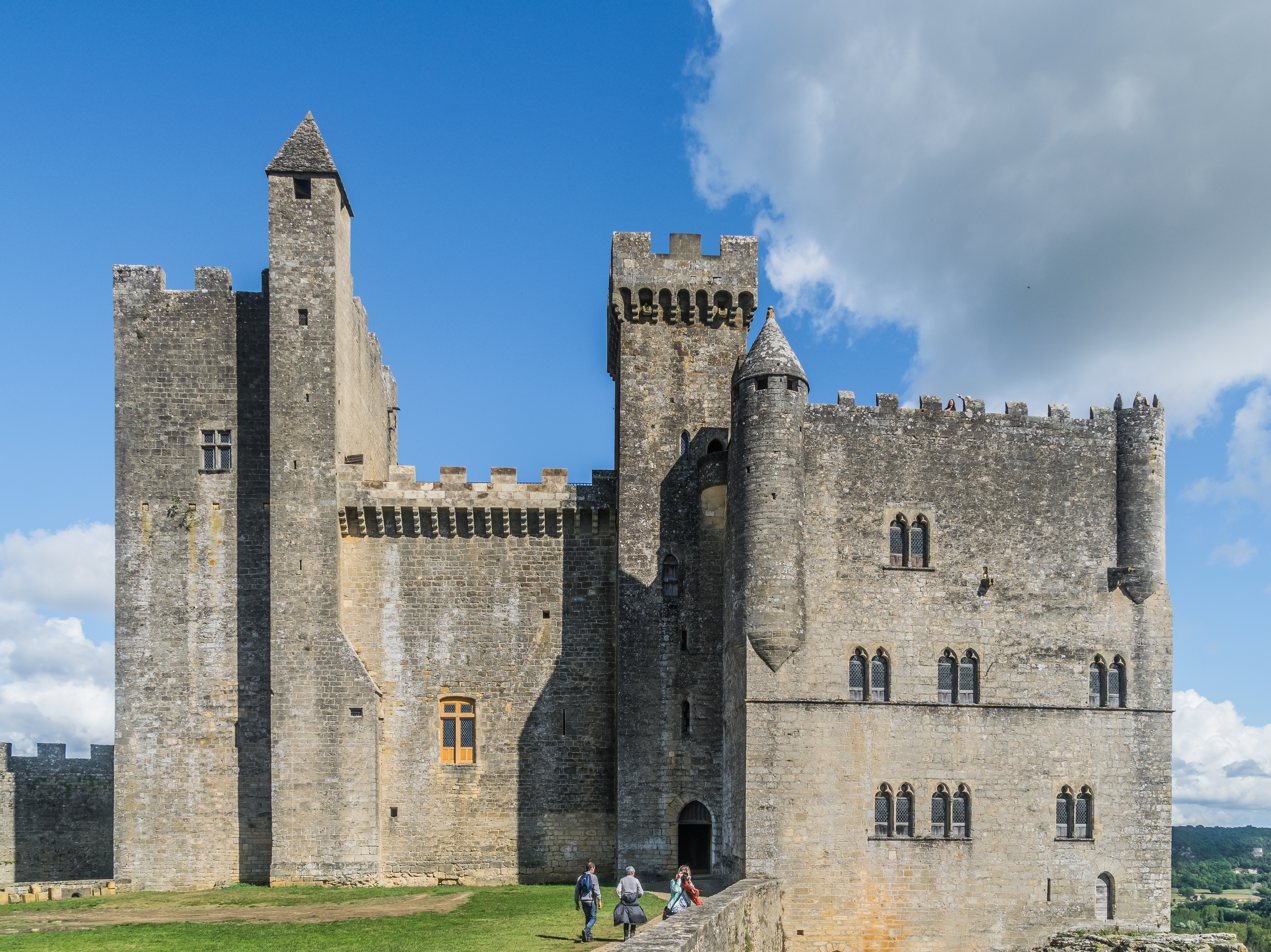
Château de Beynac

The Château de Beynac is a castle situated in the commune of Beynac-et-Cazenac, in the Dordogne département of France. The castle is one of the best-preserved and best known in the region.

This Middle Ages construction, with its austere appearance, is perched on top of a limestone cliff, dominating the town and the north bank of the Dordogne.

== History ==
The castle was built in the 12th century by the barons of Beynac (one of the four baronies of Périgord) to close the valley. The sheer cliff face being sufficient to discourage any assault from that side, the defences were built up on the plateau: double crenellated walls, double moats, one of which was a deepened natural ravine, double barbican.

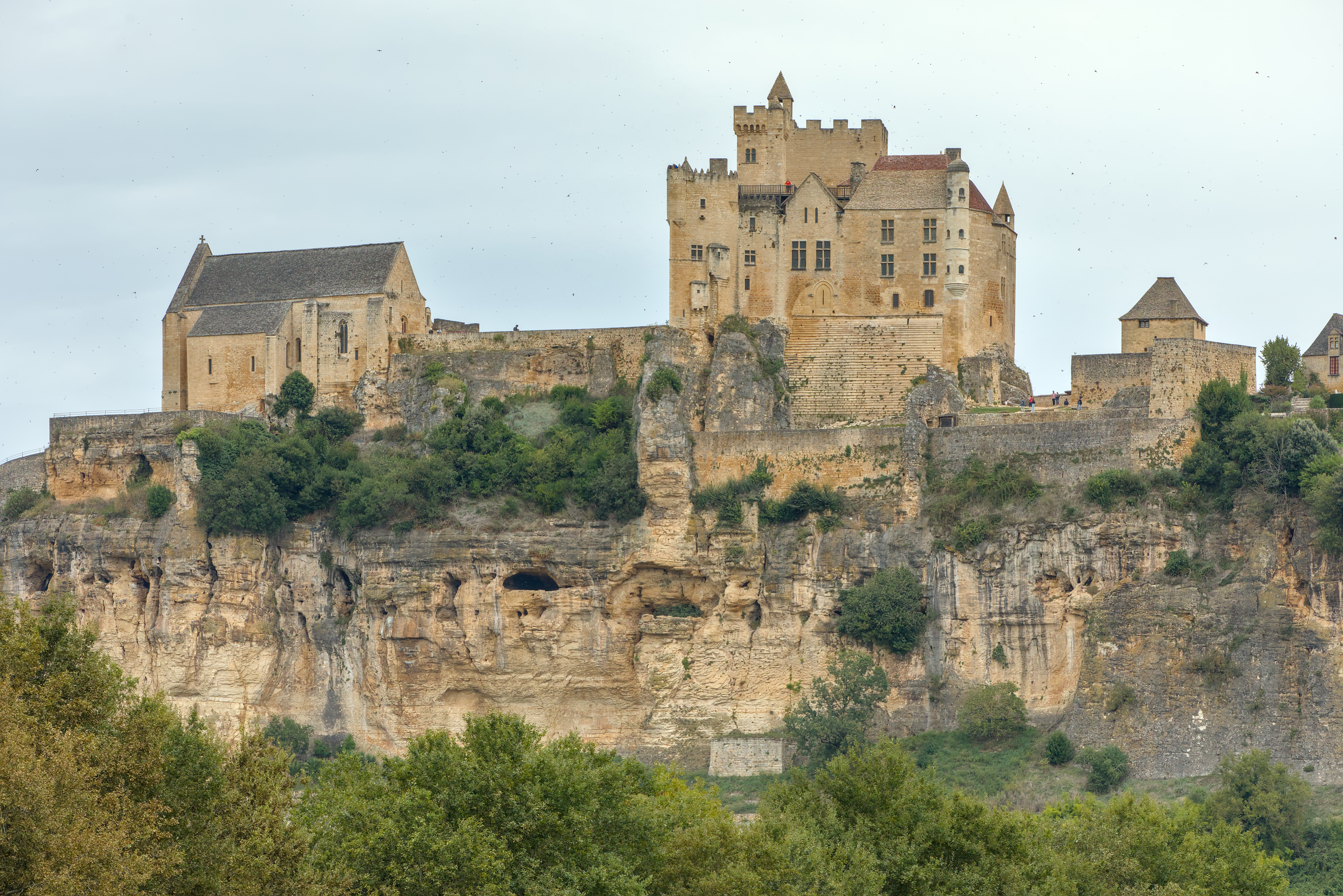
The castle is at the top of a cliff, overlookiing river Dordogne and surroundings.

The oldest part of the castle is a large, square Romanesque keep with vertical sides and few openings, held together with attached watch towers and equipped with a narrow spiral staircase terminating on a crenellated terrace. To one side, a residence of the same period is attached; it was remodelled and enlarged in the 16th and 17th centuries. On the other side is a partly 14th century residence side by side with a courtyard and a square plan staircase serving the 17th century apartments. The apartments have kept their woodwork and a painted ceiling from the 17th century. The Salle des États (States' Hall) has a Renaissance sculptured fireplace and leads into a small oratory entirely covered with 15th century frescoes, included a Pietà, a Saint Christopher, and a Last Supper in which Saint Martial (first bishop of Limoges) is the maître d'hôtel.

At the time of the Hundred Years' War, the fortress at Beynac was in French hands. The Dordogne was the border between France and England. Not far away, on the opposite bank of the river, the Château de Castelnaud was held by the English. The Dordogne region was the theatre of numerous struggles for influence, rivalries and occasionally battles between the English and French supporters. However, the castles fell more often through ruse and intrigue rather than by direct assault, because the armies needed to take these castles were extremely costly: only the richest nobles and kings could build and maintain them.

The castle was bought in 1962 by Lucien Grosso who has restored it.

Visitors to the castle can see sumptuous tapestries showing hunting and other scenes from the lives of the lords of the period.

The Château de Beynac has been listed as a monument historique by the French Ministry of Culture since 1944.

== Film location ==
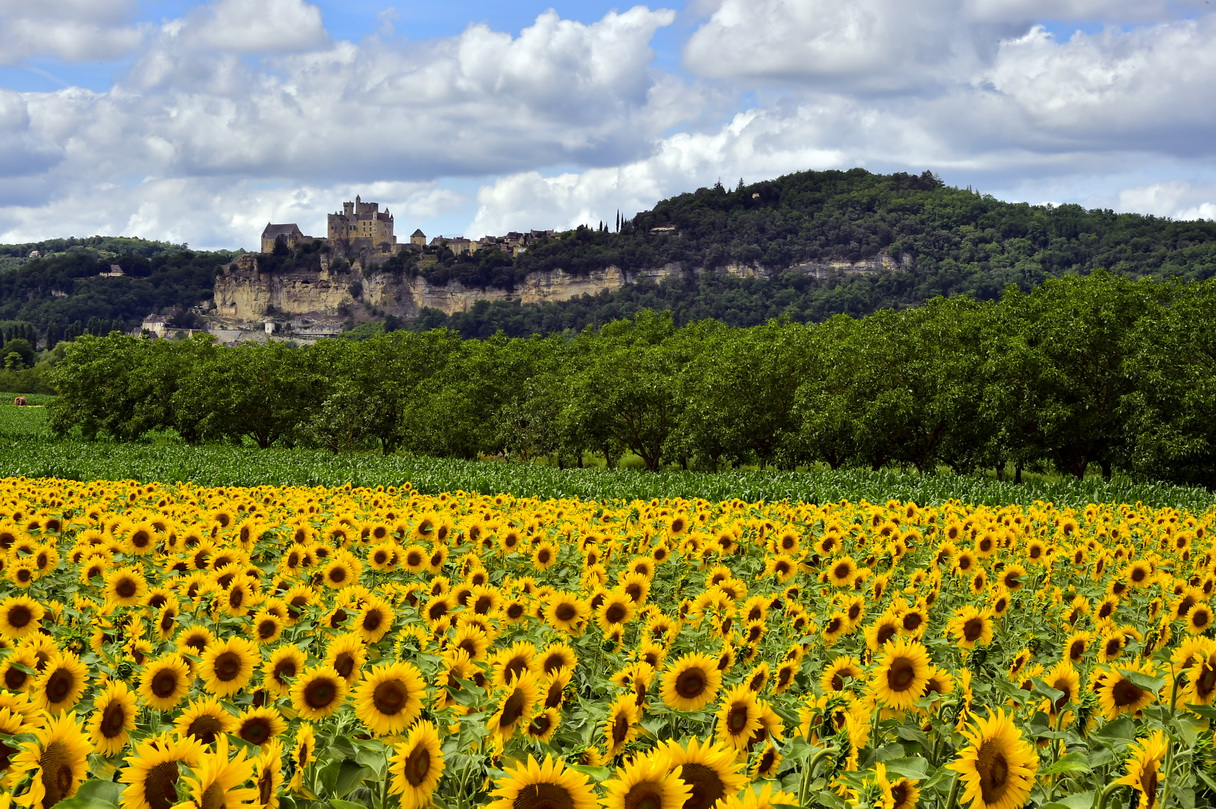
Beynac-et-Cazenac view from Jardins de Marqueyssac

The castle has been a location for several films:

- Le Capitan, known as Captain Blood in English (directed by André Hunebelle, 1960)
- Gaston Phébus (TV mini-series, 1978)
- Elle voit des nains partout ! (directed by Jean-Claude Sussfeld, 1982)
- Les Visiteurs (directed by Jean-Marie Poiré, 1993)
- La Fille de d'Artagnan, known as Revenge of the Musketeers in English (directed by Bertrand Tavernier, 1994). The kitchen table in the picture below was used by Sophie Marceau, as Éloïse d'Artagnan, against her attackers.
- Les Couloirs du temps : Les Visiteurs 2, known as The Visitors II: The Corridors of Time in English (directed by Jean-Marie Poiré, filmed around March 1997
- Ever After (directed by Andy Tennant, 1998)
- Jeanne d'Arc, known as The Messenger: The Story of Joan of Arc in English (directed by Luc Besson, 1999)
- Chocolat (directed by Lasse Hallström, 2000) portions of the film were filmed in the village of Beynac
- Fanfan la Tulipe (directed by Gérard Krawczyk, 2003)
- The Last Duel (directed by Ridley Scott, 2021)

== Barons de Beynac ==
- Maynard de Beynac (1115–1124)
- Adhémar of Le Puy (1147–1189)
- Richard Cœur de Lion, King of England (1189–1199)
- Pons I de Beynac (1200–1209)
- Gaillard de Beynac (1238–1272)
- Pons II de Beynac (1251–1300)
- Adhémar II de Beynac (1269–1348)
- Pons III de Beynac ( –1346)
- Boson, known as Pons de Beynac (1341–1348)
- Pons IV de Beynac (1362–1366)
- Philippe de Beynac ( –1403)
- Pons V de Beynac (1461–1463)
- Jean-Bertrand de Beynac ( –1485)
- Geoffroy I de Beynac ( –1530)
- François de Beynac ( –1537)
- Geoffroy II de Beynac ( –1546)
- Geoffroy III de Beynac
- Guy I de Beynac (1643– )
- Isaac de Beynac
- Guy II de Beynac
- Pierre de Beynac

The de Beynac family became extinct in the male line in 1753 with Pierre the last marquis of Beynac who married in 1727 Anne-Marie Boucher and had two daughters: Julie de Beynac married the marquis de Castelnau and Claude-Marie de Beynac married in 1761 Christophe Marie de Beaumont du Repaire. The family de Beaumont du Repaire added "Beynac" to its name and took the courtesy title of "marquis de Beaumont-Beynac".

== Gallery ==
Outside views

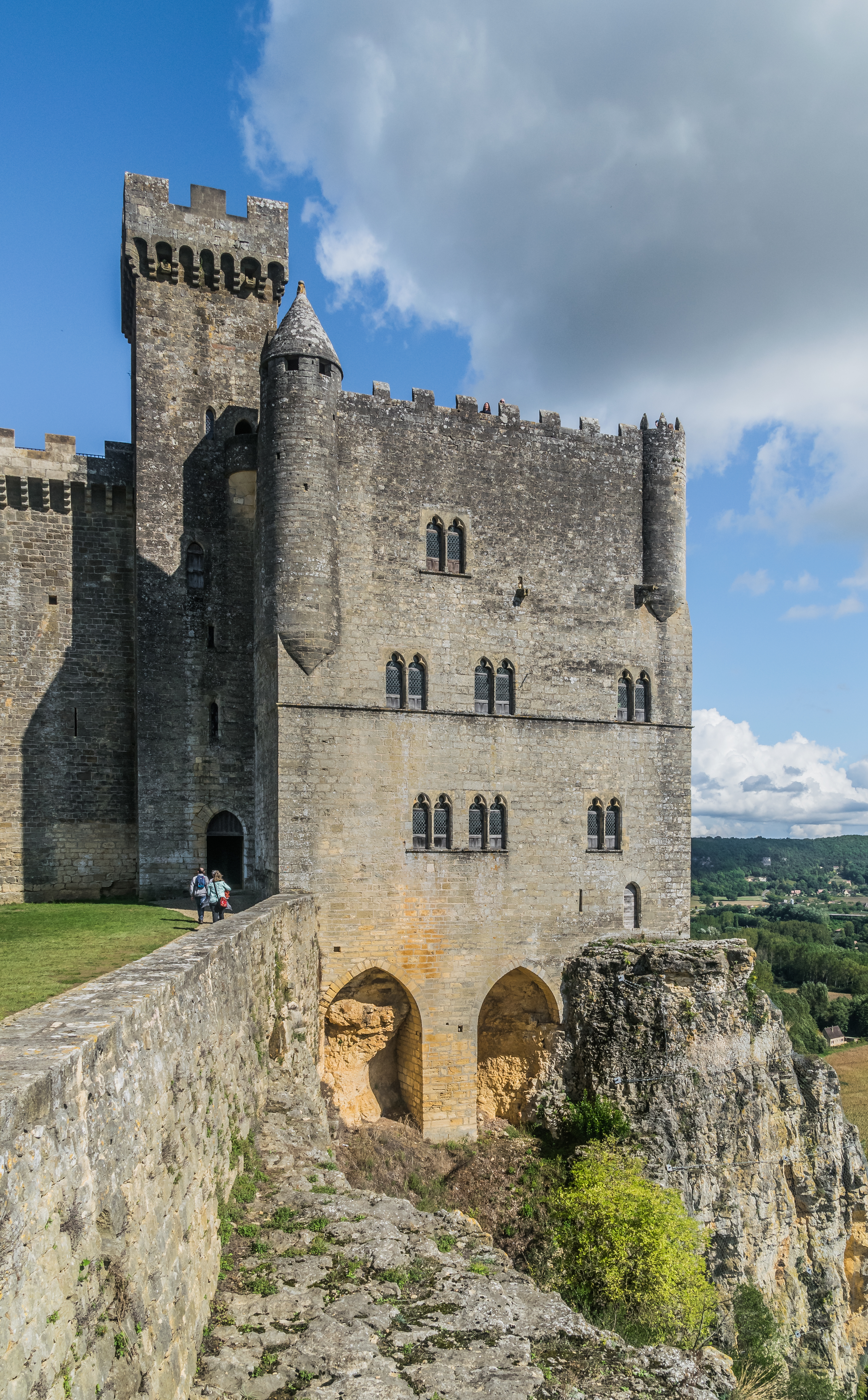
14th century extension.

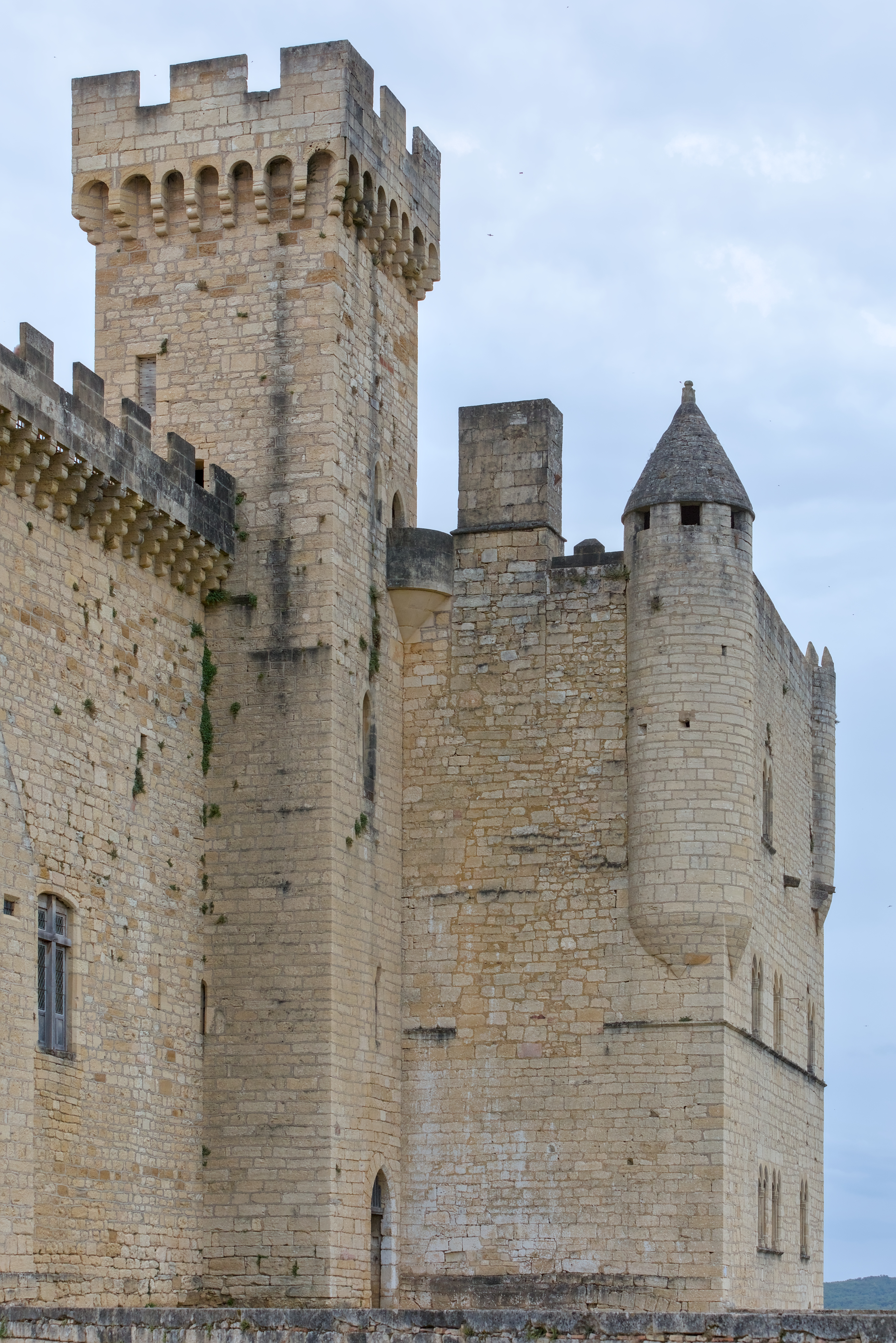

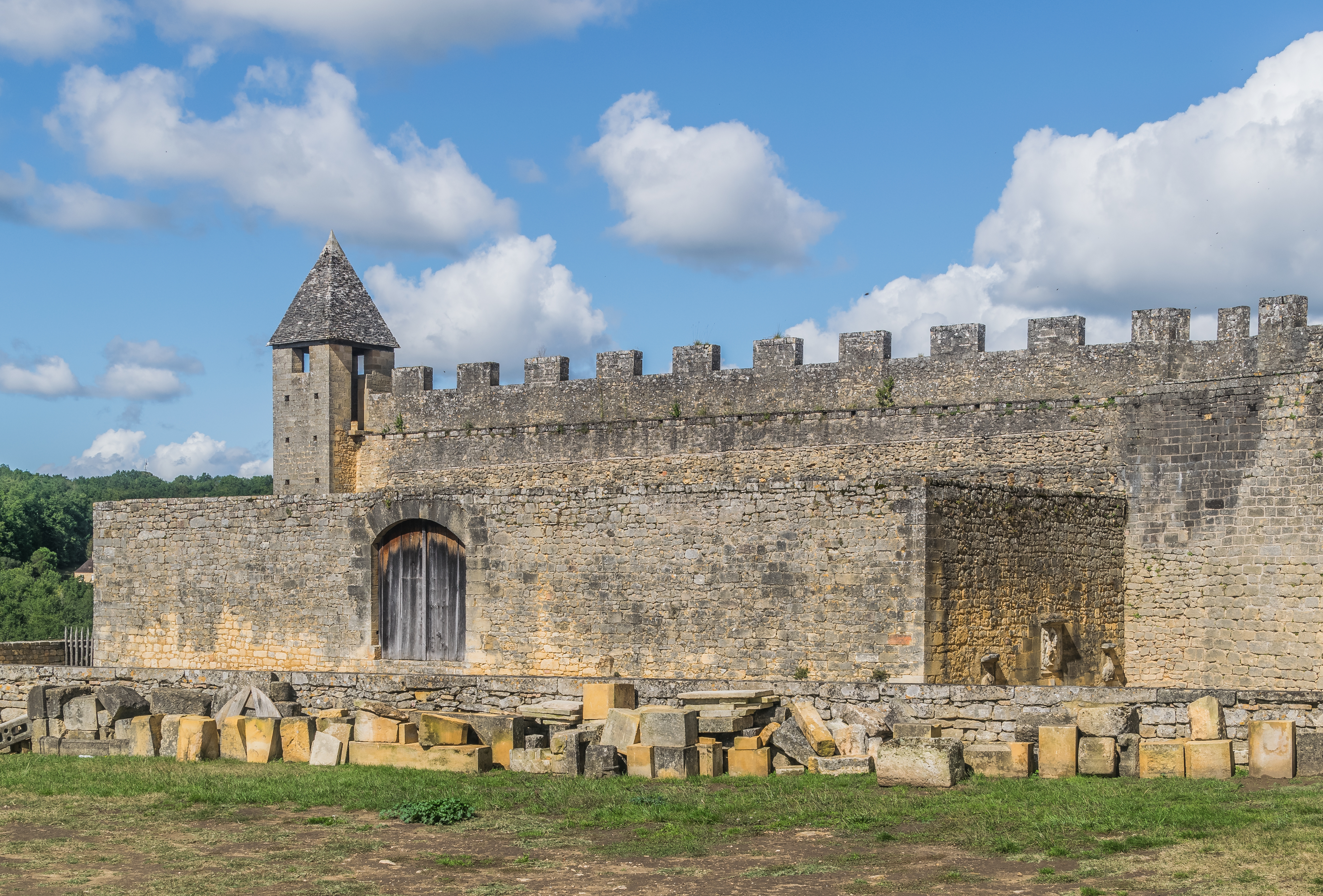
Barbican.

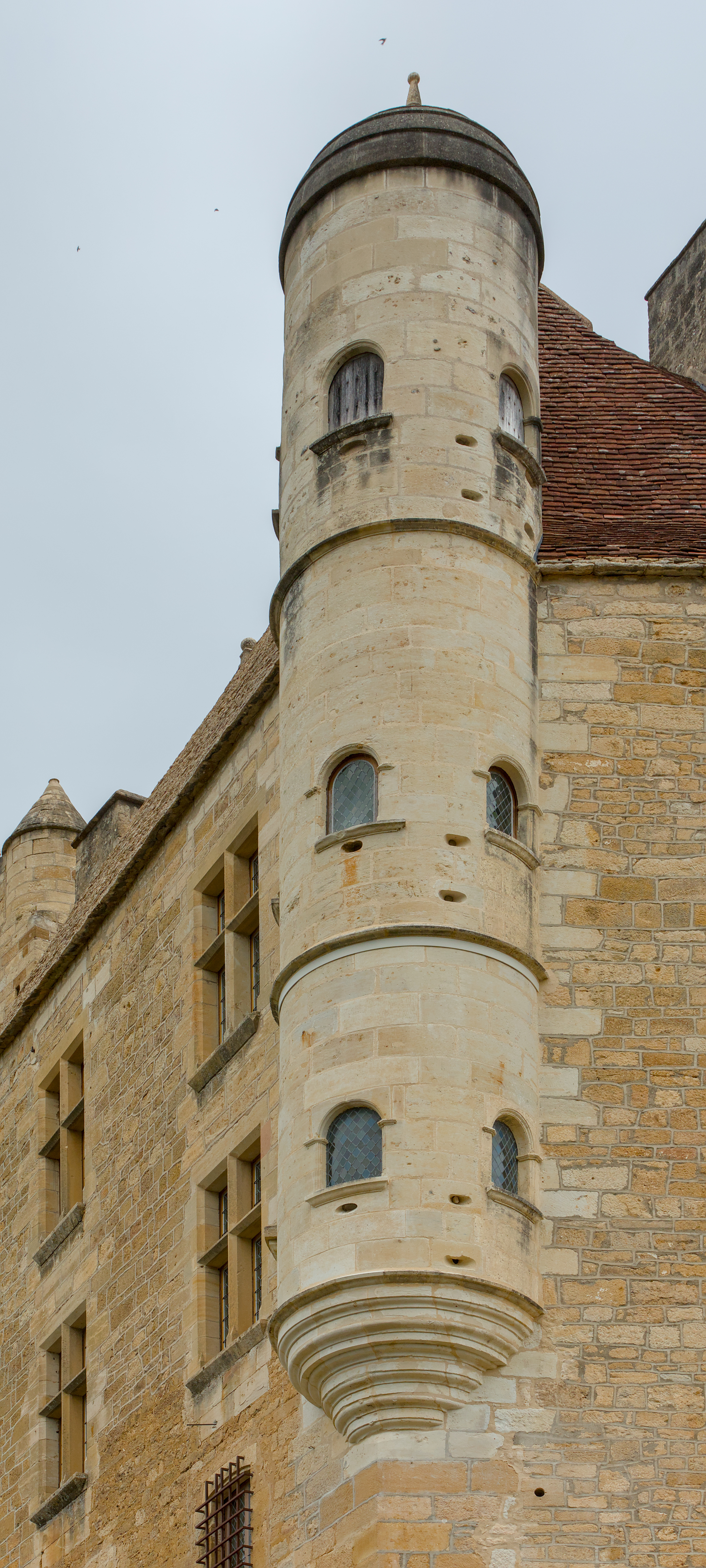
Turret.

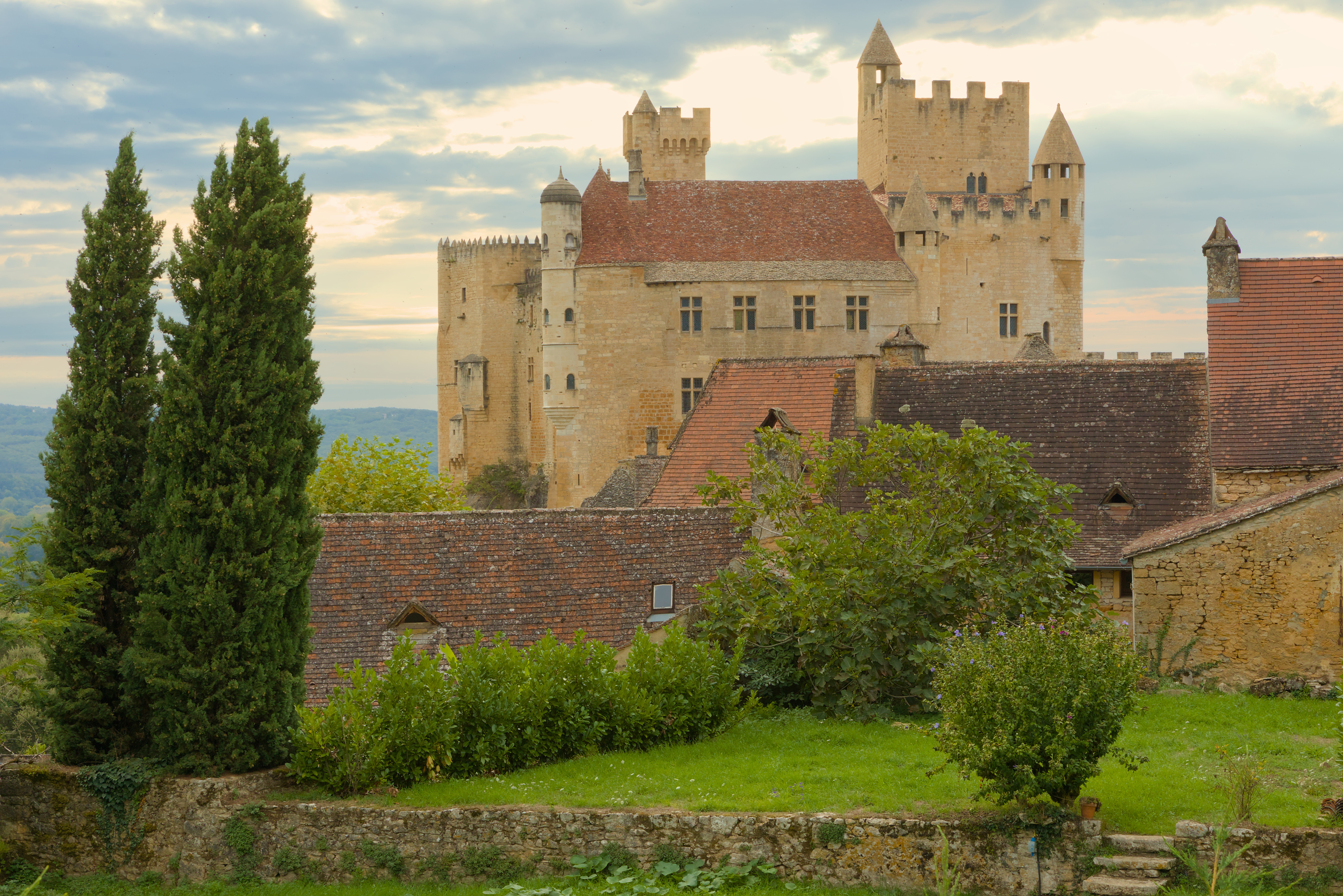
View in late afternoon.
Inside the castle

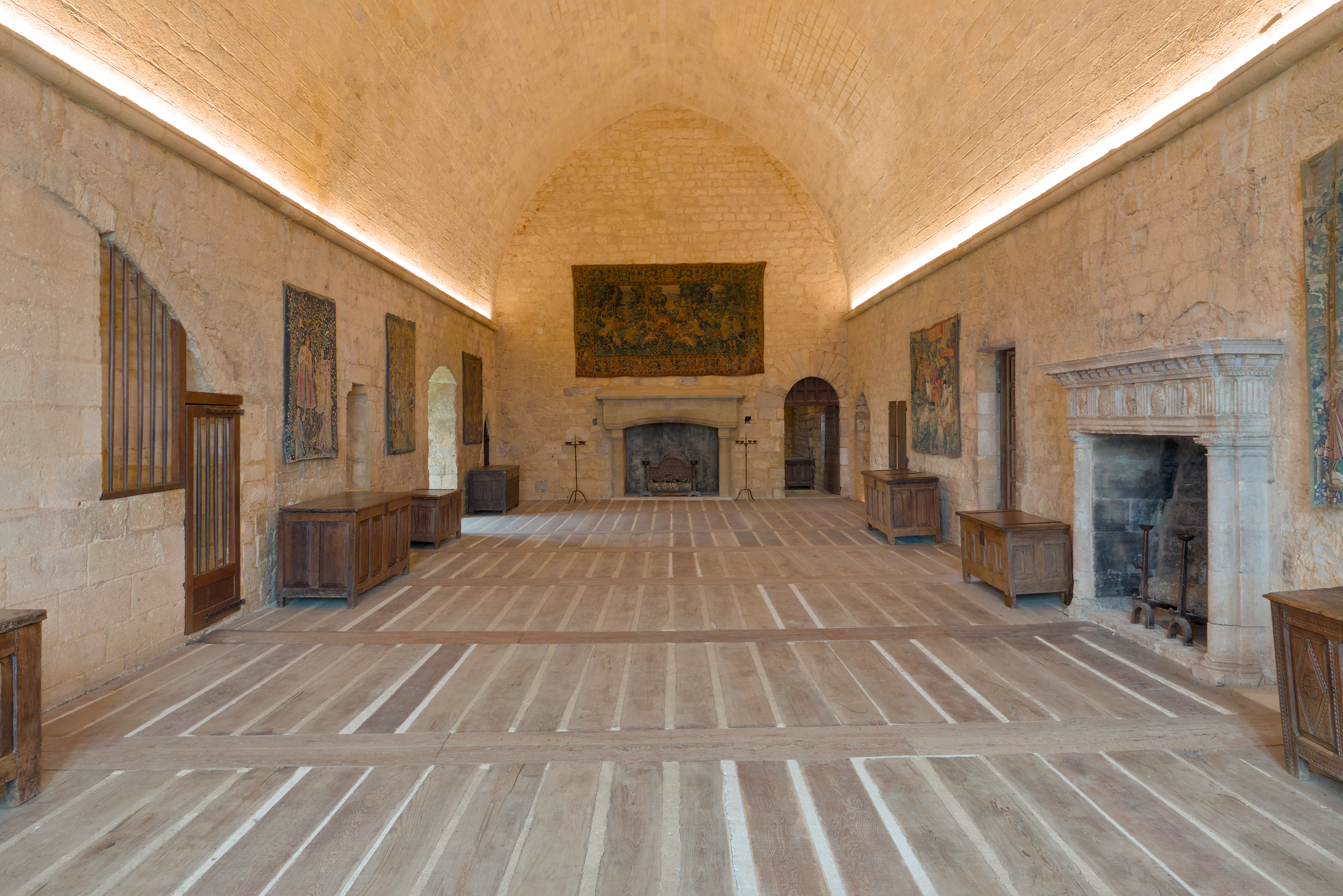
Périgord States' Hall.

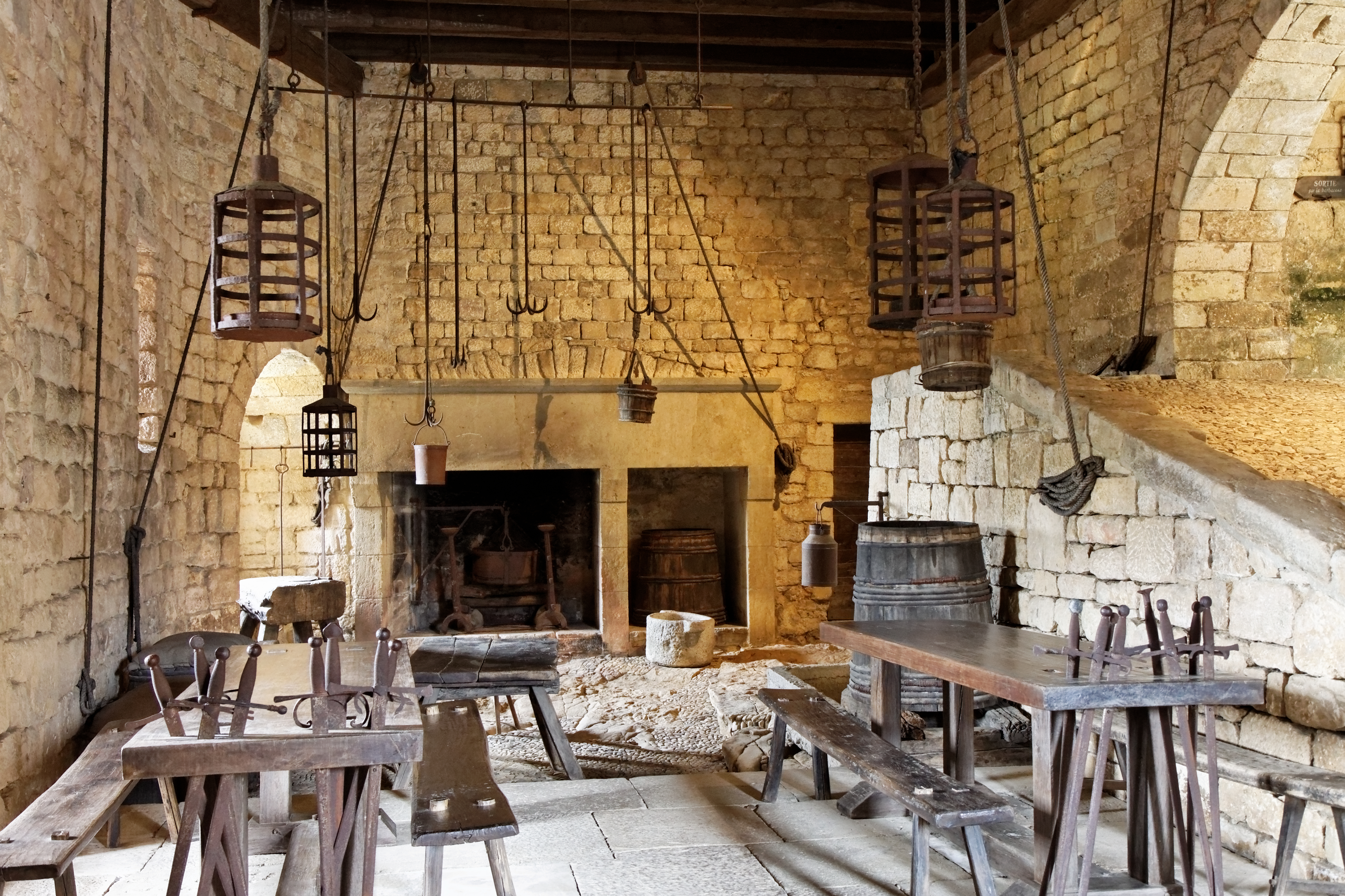
Historical kitchen.

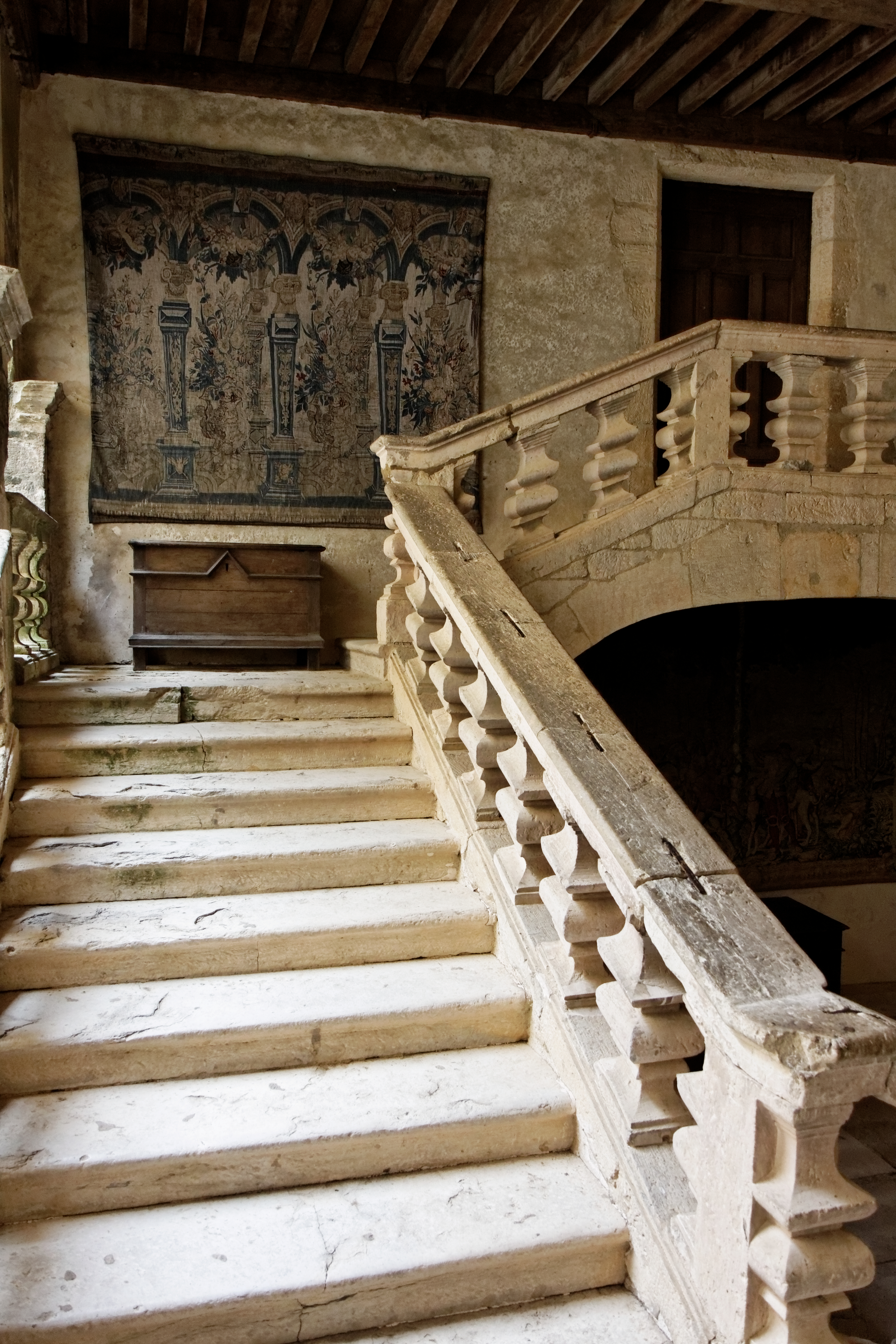
Renaissance staircase.

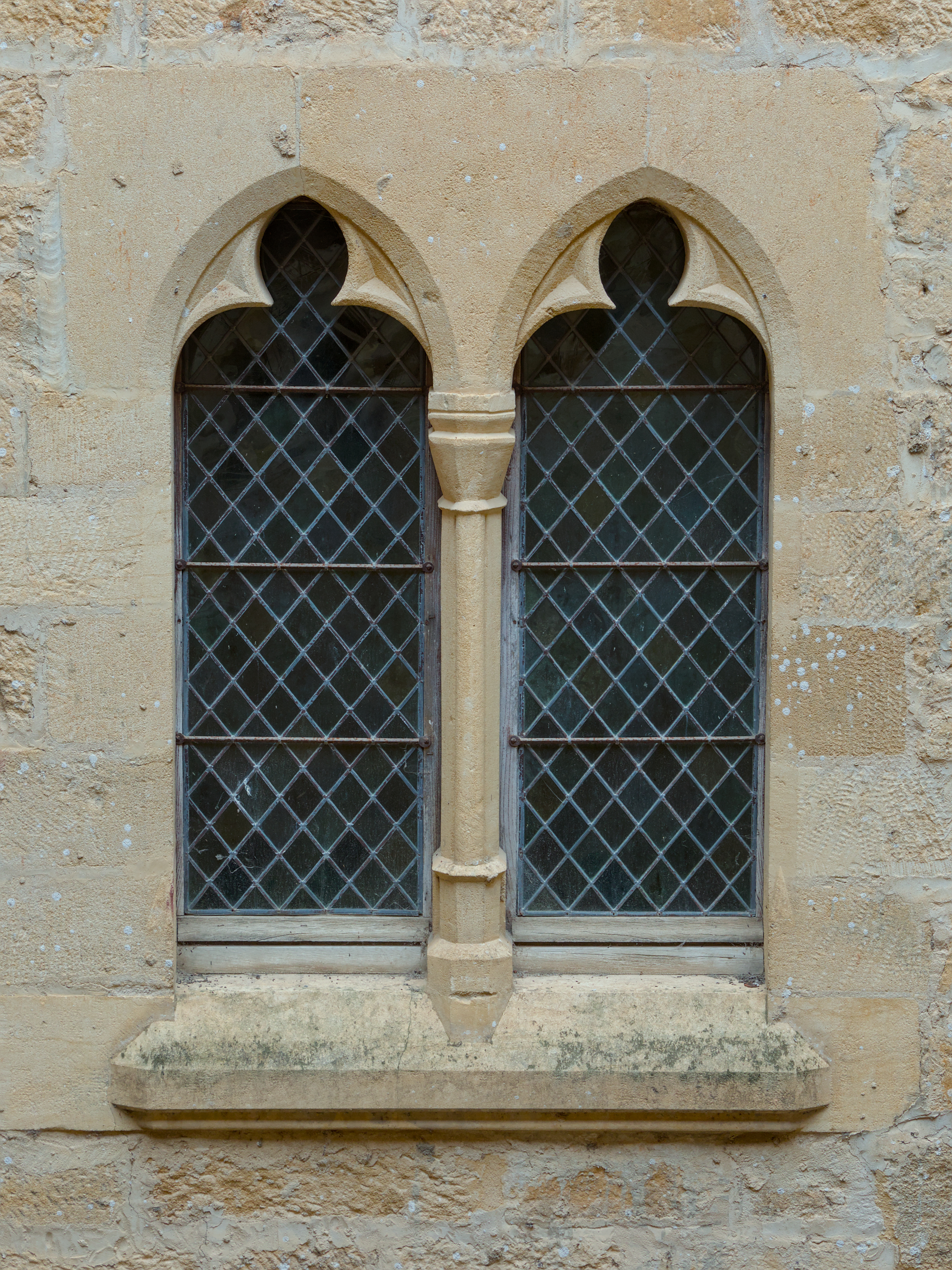
Twin windows.
Around the castle

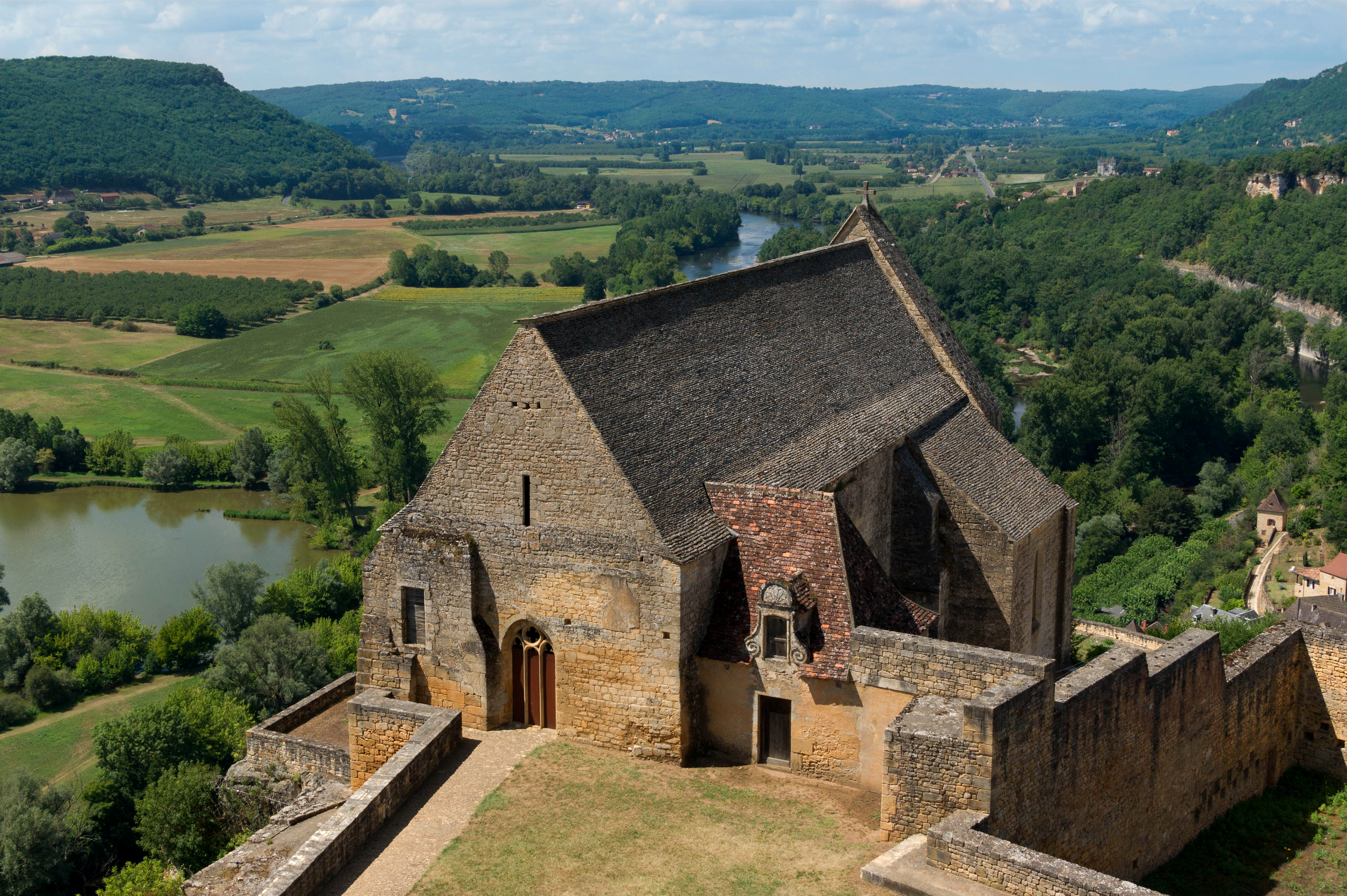
The chapel.

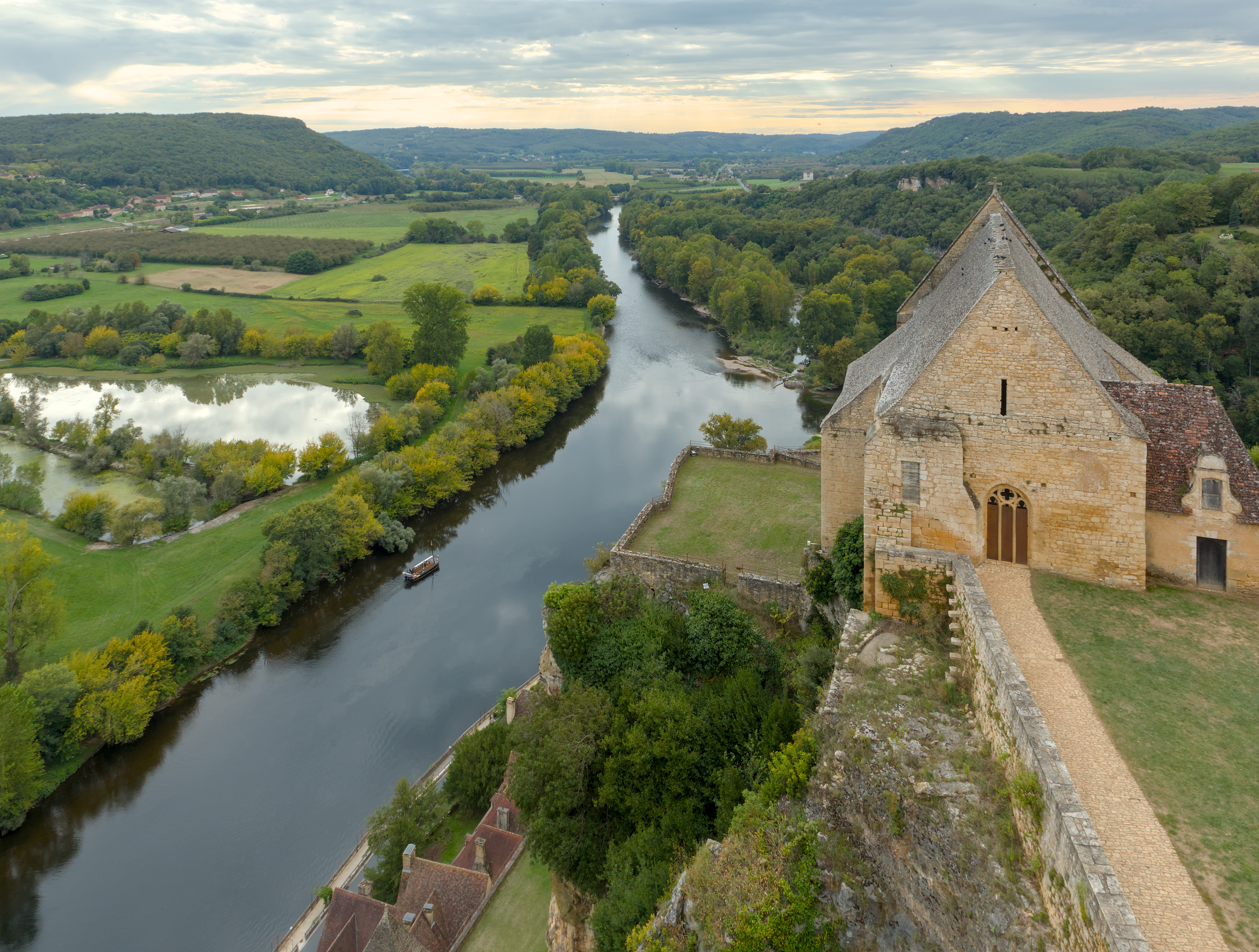
The chapel and river Dordogne.

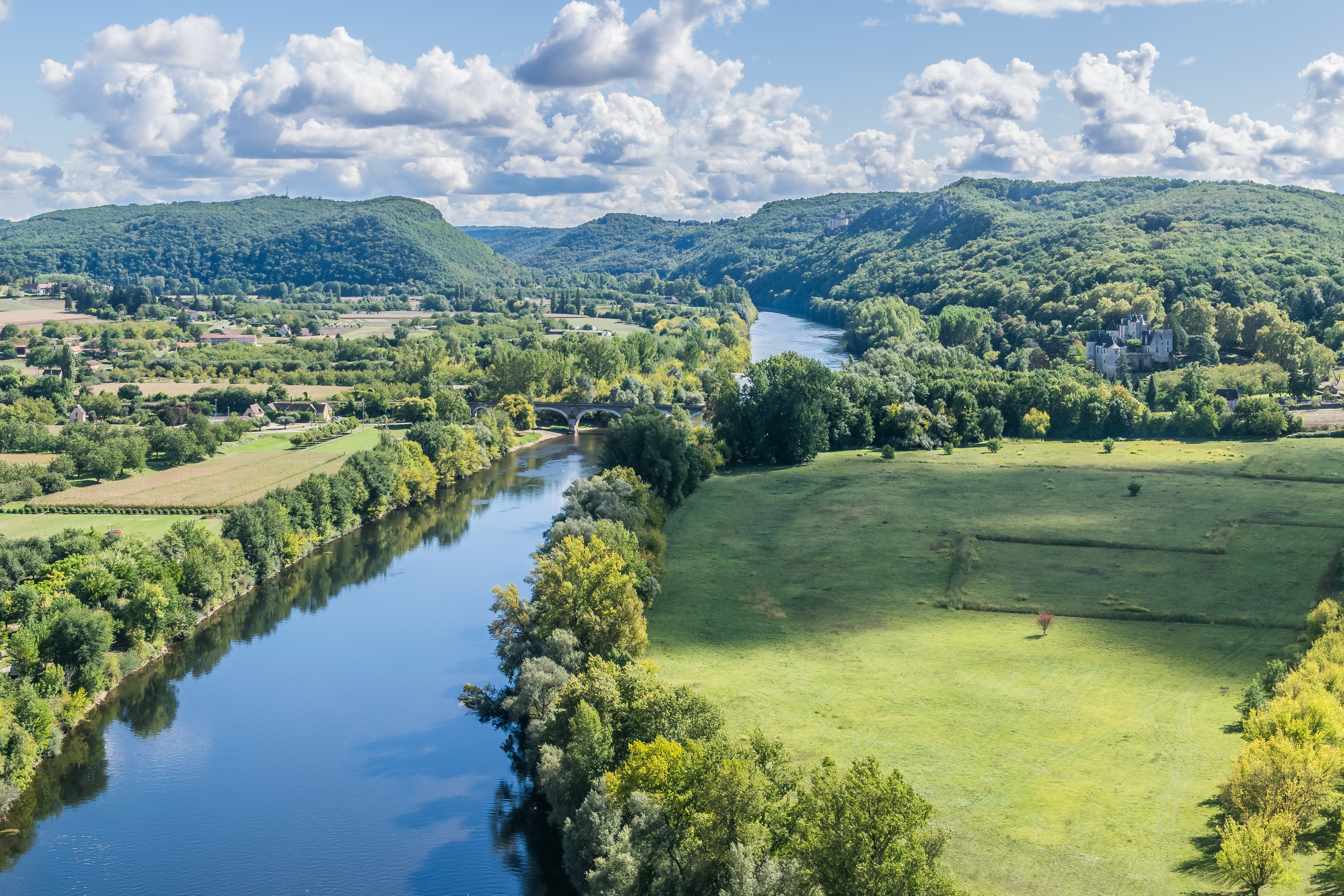
River Dordogne viewed from the castle.

== See also ==
- List of castles in France
