= Château de Castelnaud-la-Chapelle =

Medieval fortress in Castelnaud-la-Chapelle in Périgord, France

Coordinates: 44°48′57″N 1°08′56″E

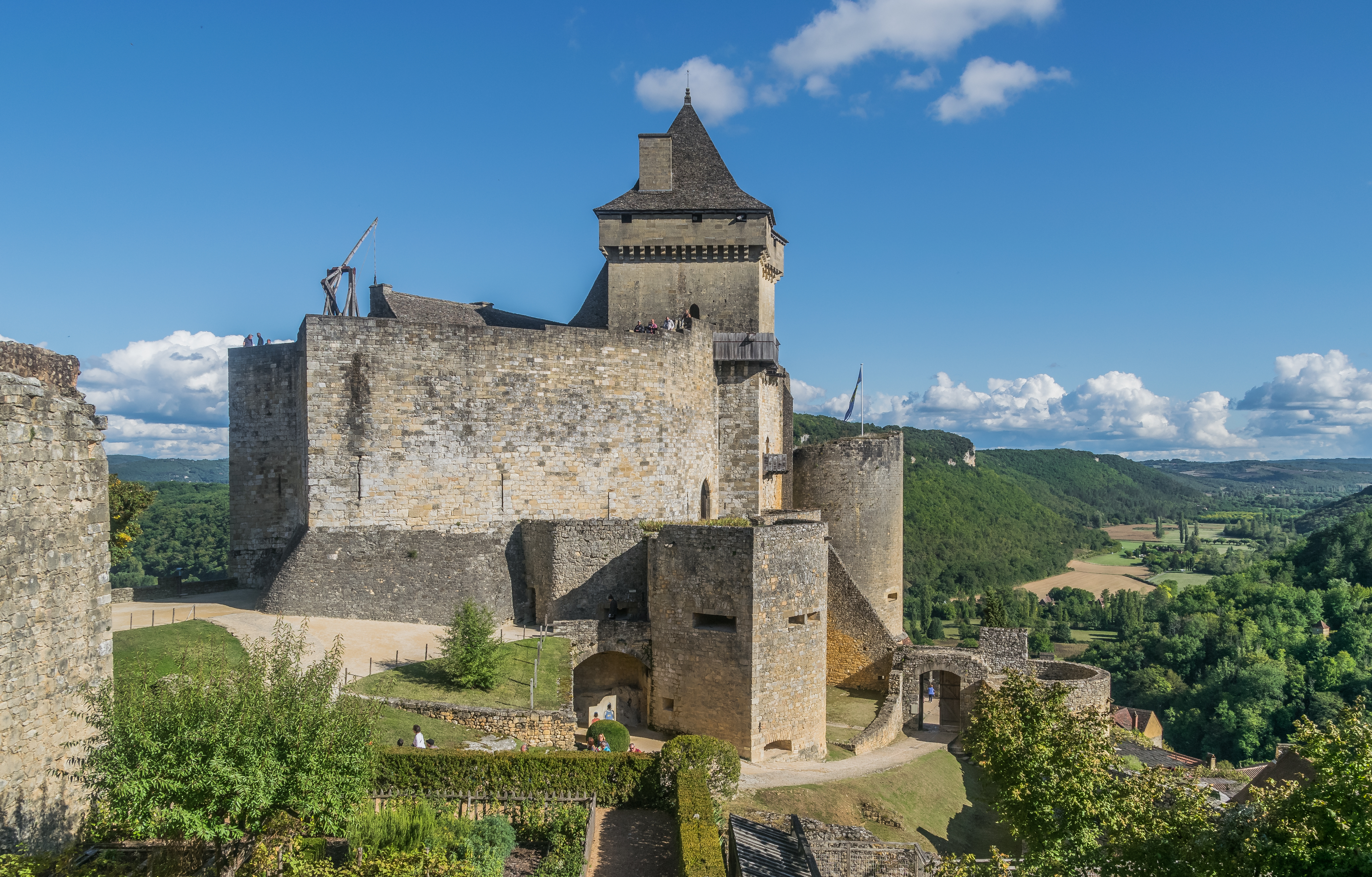
Château de Castelnaud-la-Chapelle

The Château de Castelnaud is a medieval fortress in the commune of Castelnaud-la-Chapelle, overlooking the river Dordogne in Périgord, southern France. It was erected to face its rival, the Château de Beynac.

== History ==
The oldest documents mentioning it date to the 13th century, when it figured in the Albigensian Crusade; its Cathar castellan (constable) was Bernard de Casnac. Simon de Montfort took the castle and installed a garrison; when it was retaken by Bernard, he hanged them all. During the Hundred Years' War, the castellans of Castelnaud owed their allegiance to the Plantagenets, the sieurs de Beynac across the river, to the king of France. In later times it was abandoned bit by bit, until by the time of the French Revolution it was a ruin.

== Preservation ==
The restored castle is a private property that is open to the public. It has a museum of medieval warfare, featuring reconstructions of siege engines, mangonneaux, and trebuchets. The castle is listed as a monument historique by the French Ministry of Culture.

== See also ==
- Château des Milandes, also in Castelnaud-la-Chapelle
- List of castles in France
