= Chantérac =

- Commune
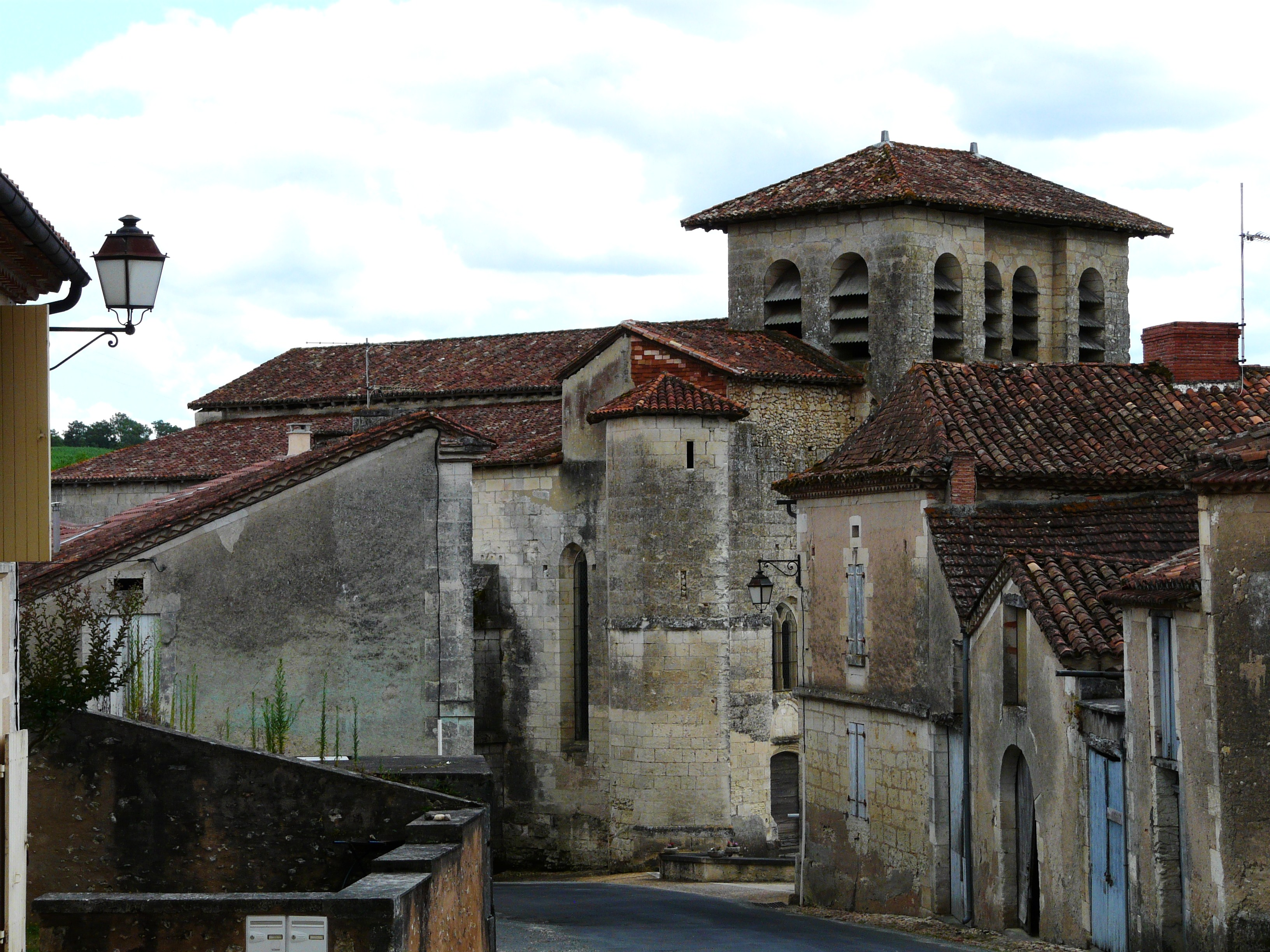
- The church in Chantérac

- Coat of arms
- Location of Chantérac
- Location within France Location within Nouvelle-Aquitaine
- Coordinates: 45°10′25″N 0°26′50″E
- Country: France
- Region: Nouvelle-Aquitaine
- Department: Dordogne
- Arrondissement: Périgueux
- Canton: Vallée de l'Isle

Government
  - Mayor (2020–2026): Jean-Michel Magne
- Area^{1}: 18.94 km^{2} (7.31 sq mi)
- Elevation: 180 m (590 ft)
- Highest elevation: 217 m (712 ft)
- Lowest elevation: 81 m (266 ft)
- Population (2023): 652
  - Density: 34.4/km^{2} (89.2/sq mi)
- Time zone: UTC+01:00 (CET)
  - Summer (DST): UTC+02:00 (CEST)
- INSEE/Postal code: 24104 /24190
- ^{1} French Land Register data, which excludes lakes, ponds, glaciers > 1 km^{2} (0.386 sq mi or 247 acres) and river estuaries.

Chantérac (French pronunciation: [ʃɑ̃teʁak]; Occitan: Chantairac) is a commune in the Dordogne department in Nouvelle-Aquitaine in southwestern France. Château de Chantérac is a château in the commune.

== Population ==
Historical population
Year	Pop.	±% p.a.
1968	515	—
1975	414	−3.07%
1982	418	+0.14%
1990	461	+1.23%
1999	456	−0.12%
2007	520	+1.66%
2012	566	+1.71%
2017	616	+1.71%
2023	652	+0.95%
Source: INSEE

== See also ==
- Communes of the Dordogne department
