= Château de Jaurias =

Château in Nouvelle-Aquitaine, France

- Nouvelle-Aquitaine, France
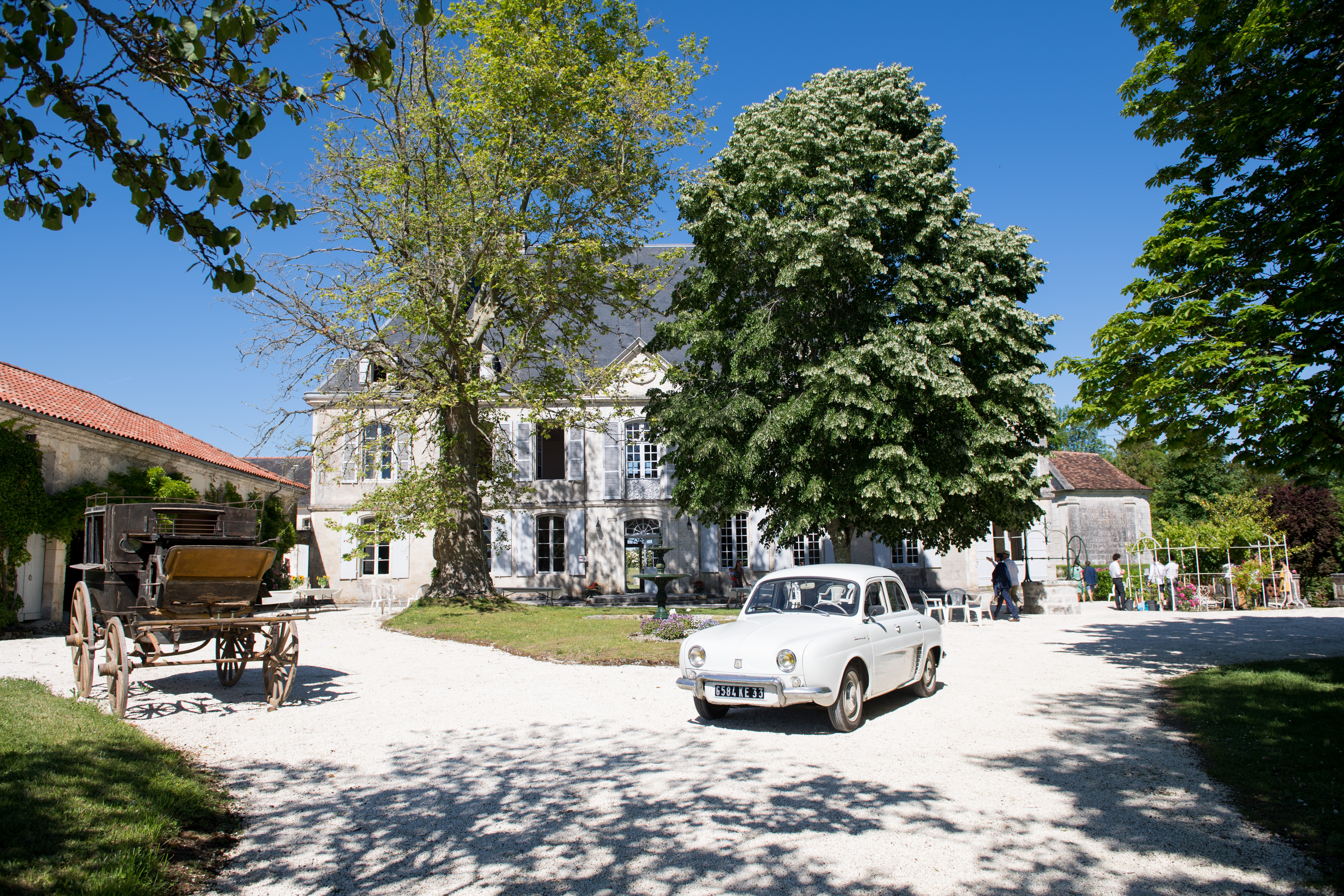
- Jaurias Castle in 2019.

Site information
- Type: Castle
- Owner: Palfray Family

Location
- Coordinates: 45°24′45″N 0°24′43″E

Château de Jaurias is a château in Gout-Rossignol, Dordogne, Nouvelle-Aquitaine, France.

== History ==
Château de Jaurias was built in 1760 by Léonard Aubin.

== See also ==
- Gout-Rossignol
