= Château de la Mothe =

Château in Nouvelle-Aquitaine, France

Coordinates: 45°13′51″N 0°12′00″E

The Château de la Mothe is a château in Saint-Privat-des-Prés, Dordogne, Nouvelle-Aquitaine, France.
