= La Roque-Gageac =

- Commune
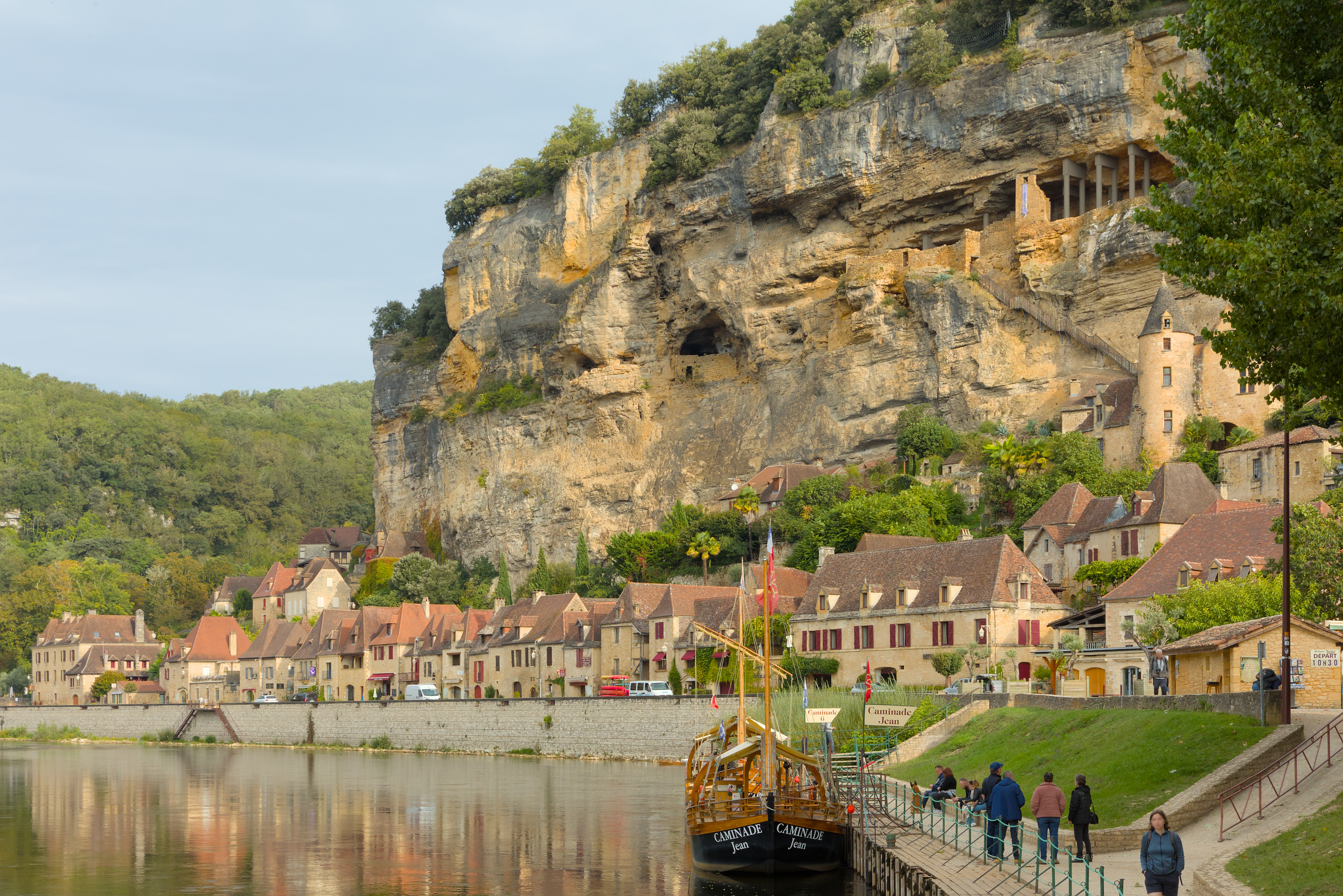
- La Roque-Gageac, a village between cliff and river

- Coat of arms
- Location of La Roque-Gageac
- Location within France Location within Nouvelle-Aquitaine
- Coordinates: 44°49′38″N 1°11′00″E
- Country: France
- Region: Nouvelle-Aquitaine
- Department: Dordogne
- Arrondissement: Sarlat-la-Canéda
- Canton: Sarlat-la-Canéda

Government
  - Mayor (2020–2026): Jérôme Peyrat
- Area^{1}: 7.17 km^{2} (2.77 sq mi)
- Elevation: 80 m (260 ft)
- Highest elevation: 218 m (715 ft)
- Lowest elevation: 60 m (200 ft)
- Population (2023): 448
  - Density: 62.5/km^{2} (162/sq mi)
- Time zone: UTC+01:00 (CET)
  - Summer (DST): UTC+02:00 (CEST)
- INSEE/Postal code: 24355 /24250
- ^{1} French Land Register data, which excludes lakes, ponds, glaciers > 1 km^{2} (0.386 sq mi or 247 acres) and river estuaries.

La Roque-Gageac (French pronunciation: [la ʁɔk ɡaʒak]; Occitan: La Ròca de Gajac) is a commune in the Dordogne department in Nouvelle-Aquitaine, southwestern France.

Perched above the river Dordogne, the village is a member of the association Les Plus Beaux Villages de France ("The most beautiful villages of France").

== Population ==
Historical population
Year	Pop.	±% p.a.
1968	357	—
1975	373	+0.63%
1982	404	+1.15%
1990	447	+1.27%
1999	449	+0.05%
2007	416	−0.95%
2012	438	+1.04%
2017	440	+0.09%
2023	448	+0.30%
Source: INSEE

== See also ==
- Communes of the Dordogne department
