= Manoir de Jaillac =

Château in Nouvelle-Aquitaine, France

Coordinates: 45°17′11″N 0°49′11″E

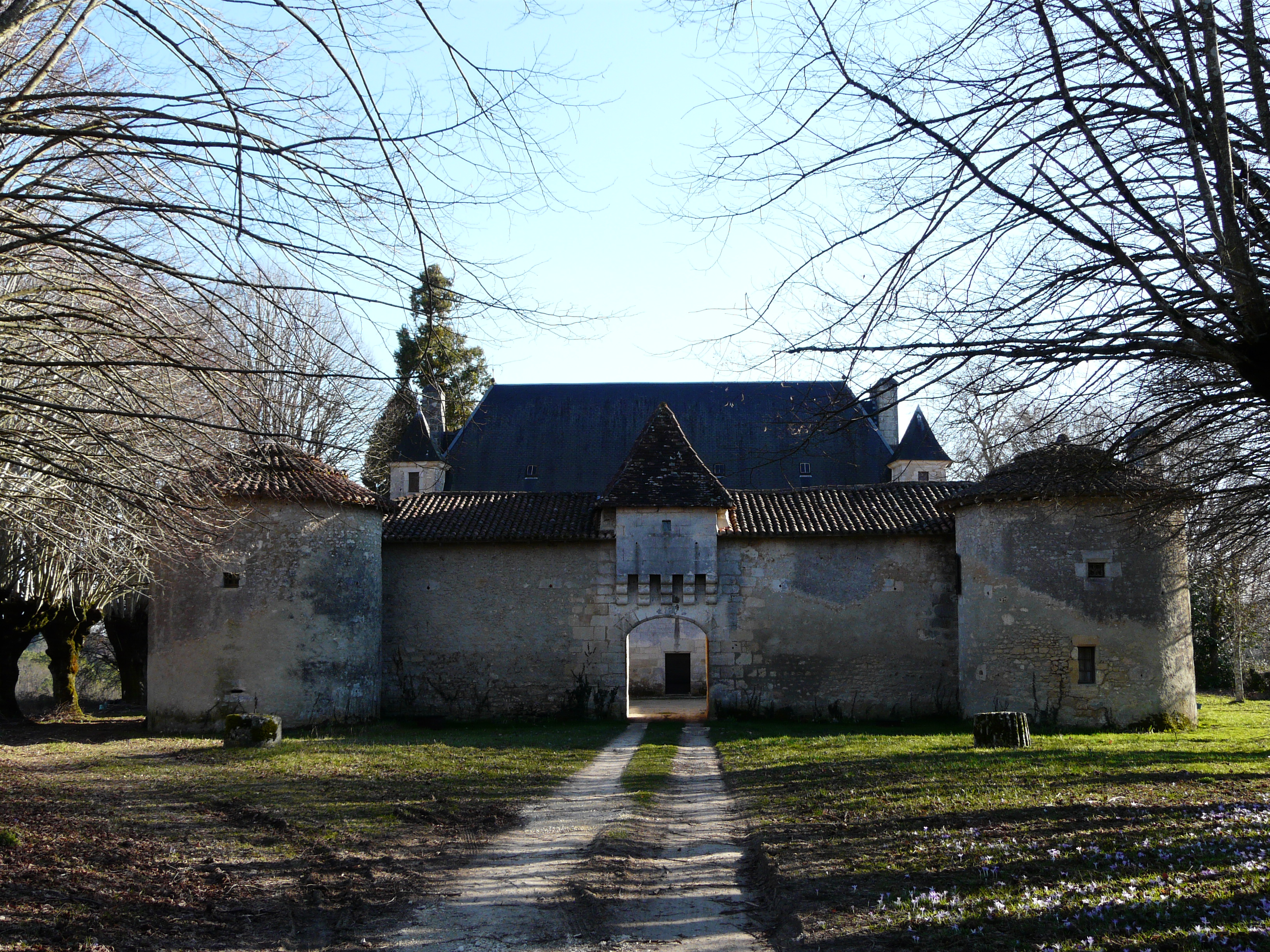
Entrance to Manoir de Jaillac

Manoir de Jaillac is a château in Dordogne, Nouvelle-Aquitaine, France.
