= Manoir de Grézignac =

Château in France

Coordinates: 45°13′56″N 0°52′07″E

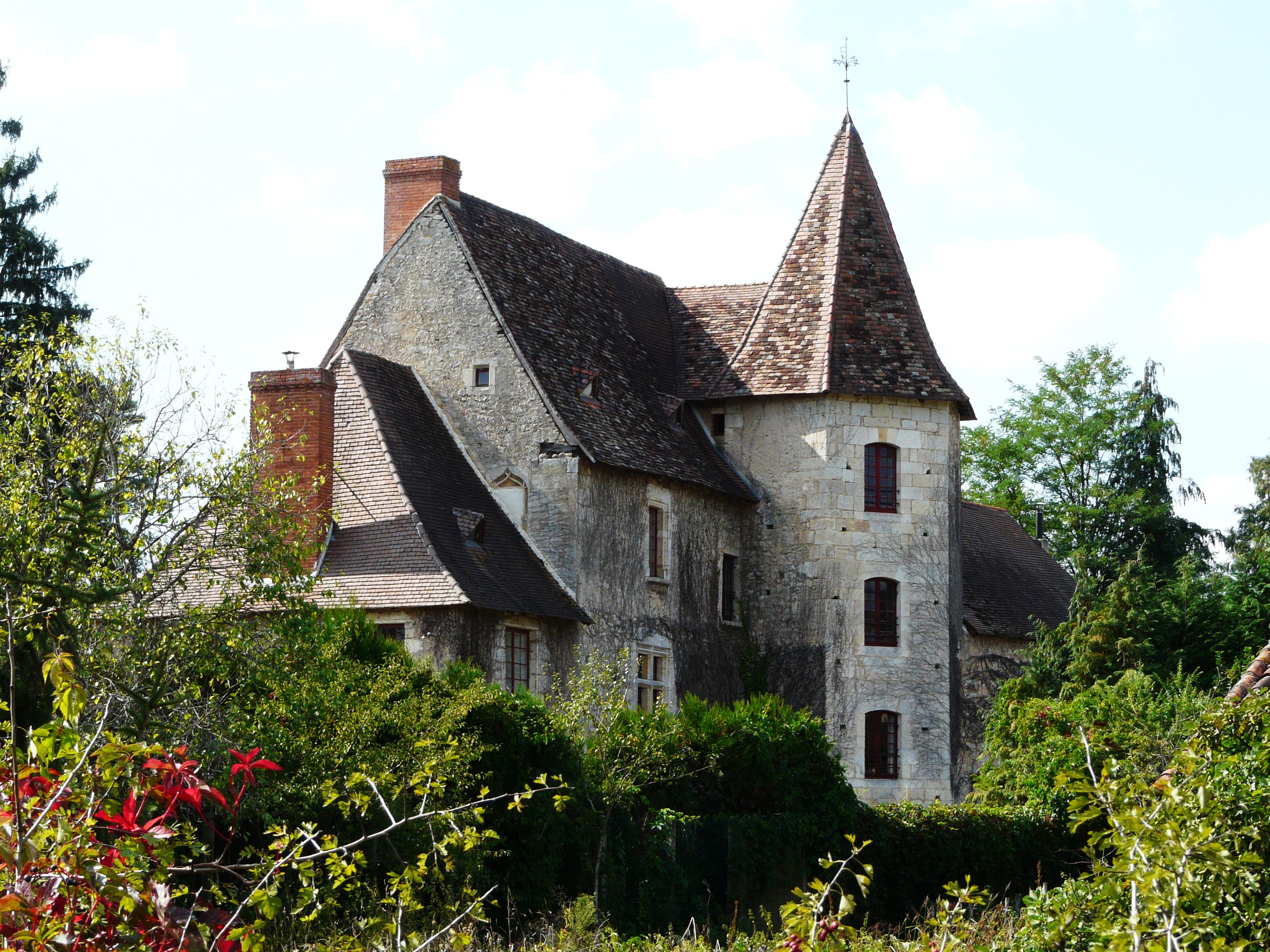
View of Manoir de Grézignac from the south-east

Manoir de Grézignac is a château in Dordogne, Nouvelle-Aquitaine, France.
