= Manoir de la Borie-Fricart =

Château in Aquitaine, France

Coordinates: 45°19′19″N 0°41′39″E

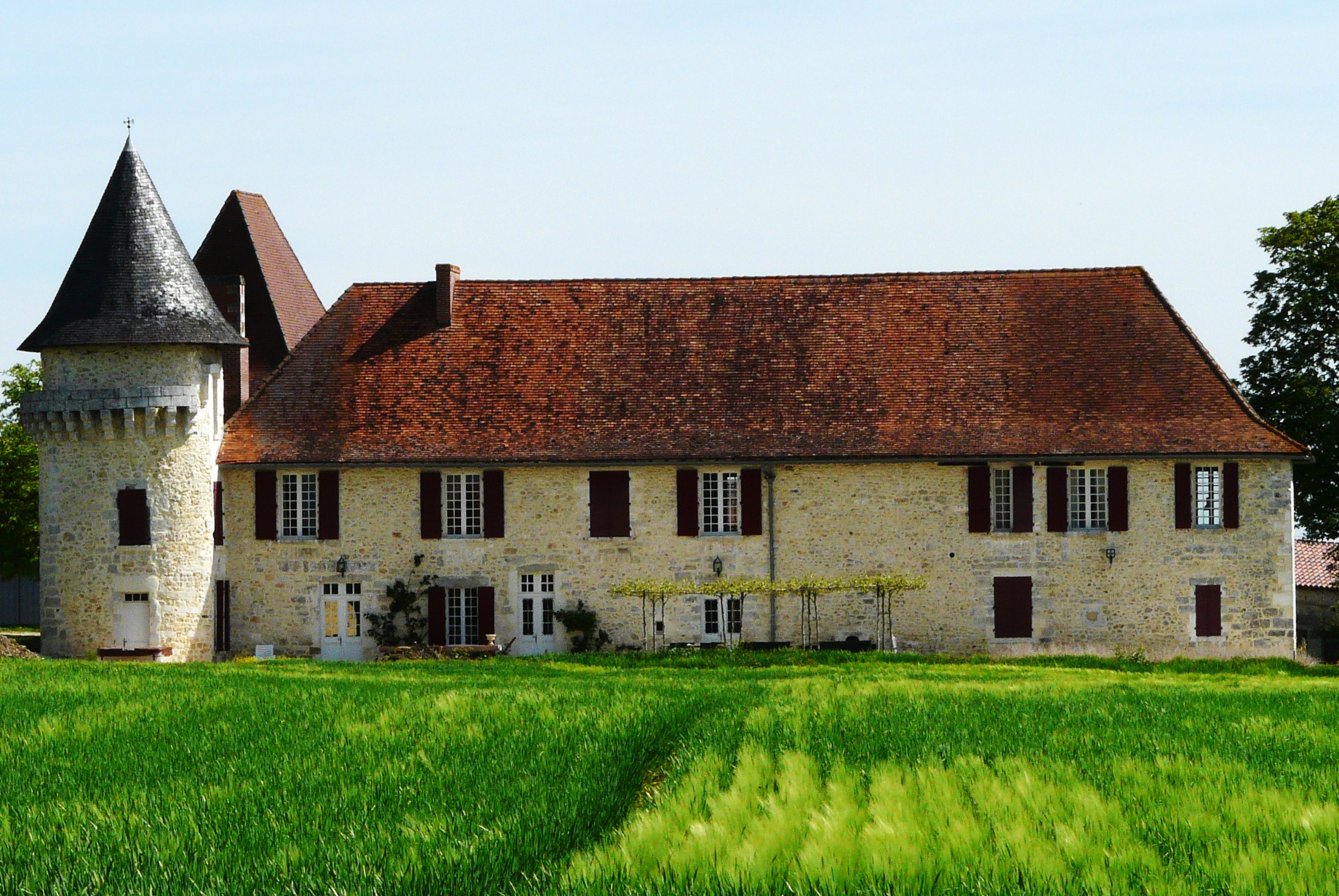

The Manoir de la Borie-Fricart is a château in the Dordogne, Aquitaine, France.
