= Château de Chantérac =

Château in Nouvelle-Aquitaine, France

Coordinates: 45°10′54″N 0°25′57″E

The Château de Chantérac is a château in Chantérac, Dordogne, Nouvelle-Aquitaine, France.
