= Maison forte de Reignac =

Coordinates: 44°58′46″N 1°03′19″E

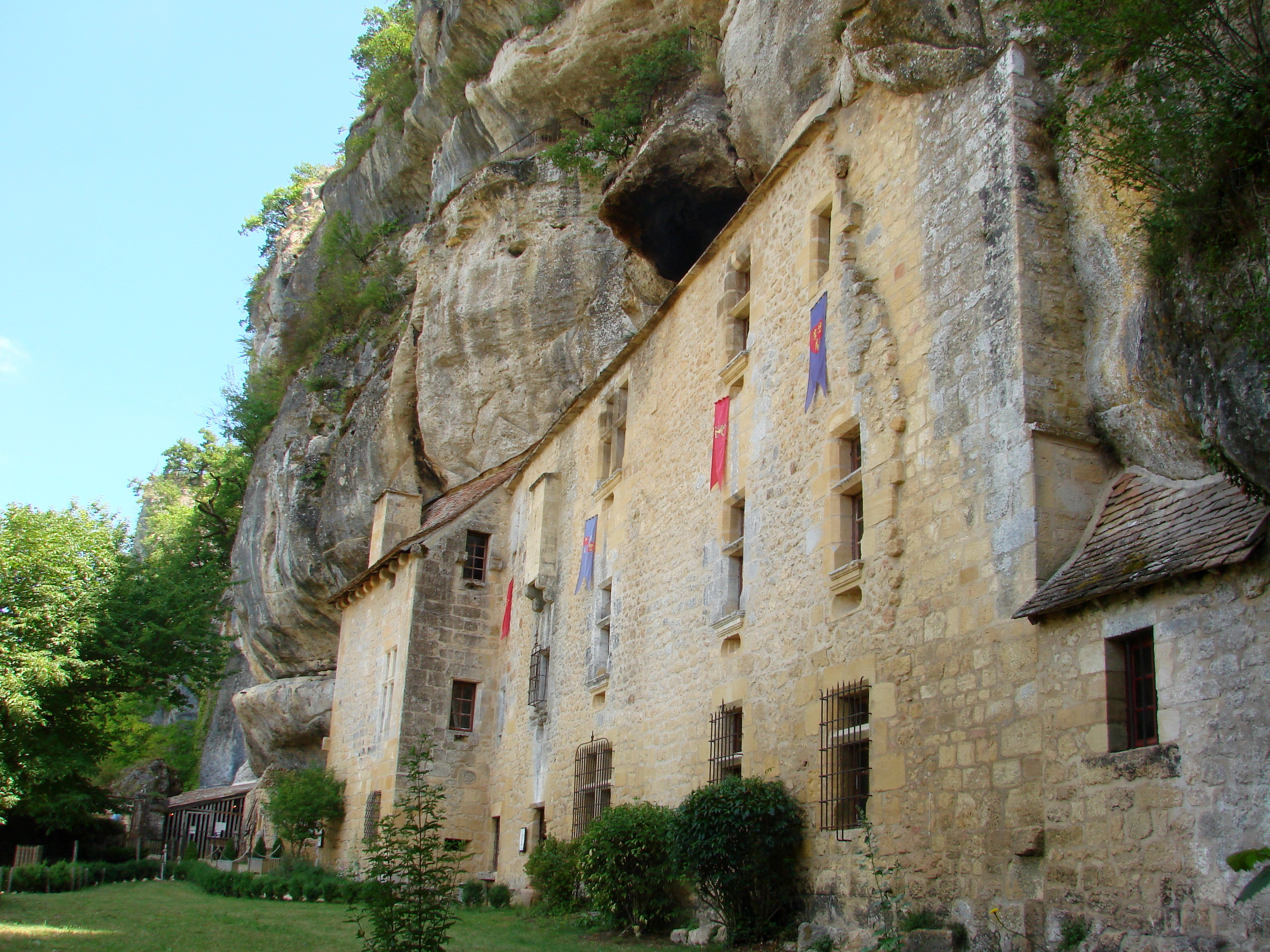

The Maison forte de Reignac is a château in Dordogne, Nouvelle-Aquitaine, France. It is built into the rock face.
