= Gout-Rossignol =

- Commune
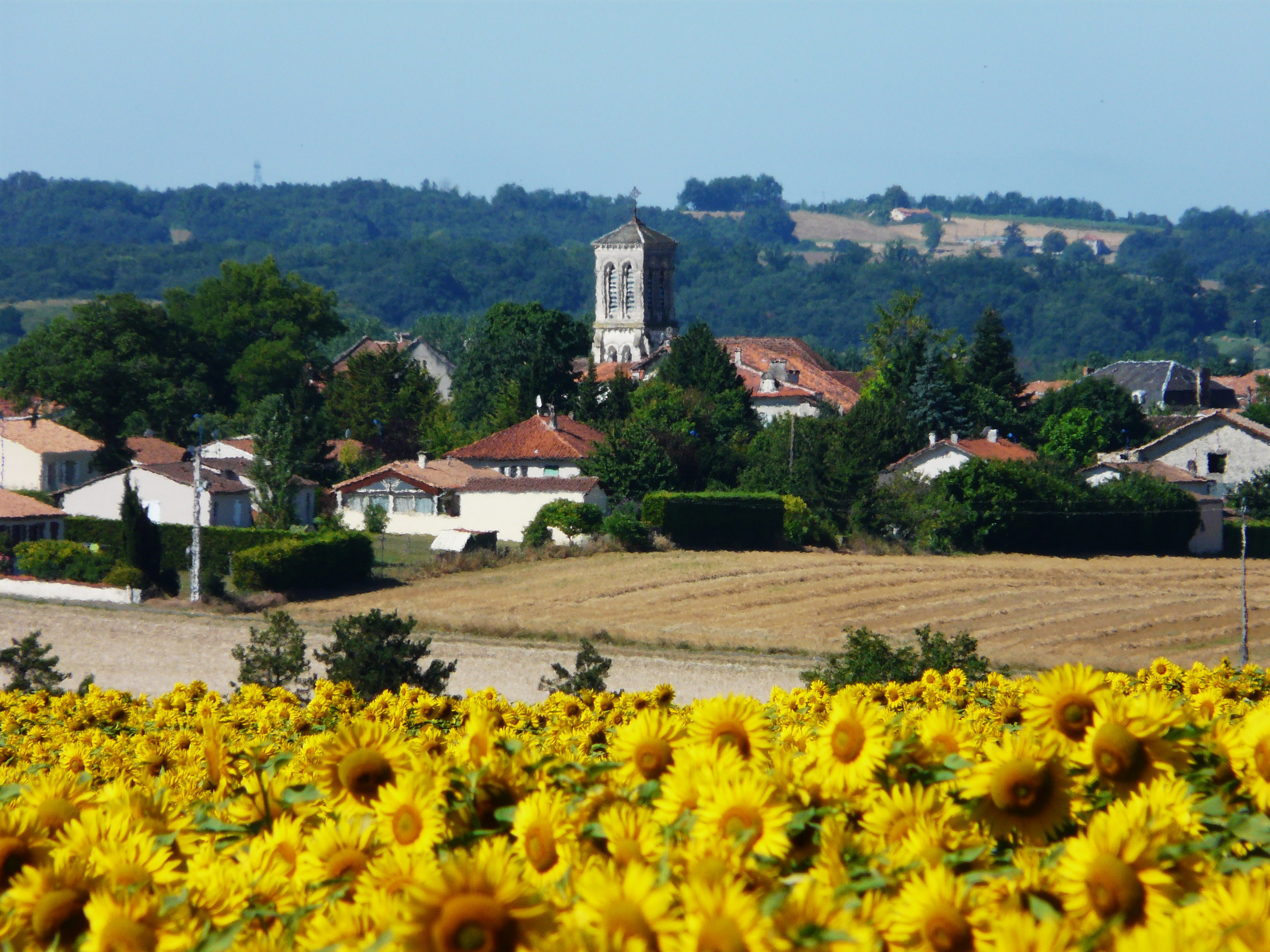
- A general view of Gout-Rossignol
- Location of Gout-Rossignol
- Location within France Location within Nouvelle-Aquitaine
- Coordinates: 45°24′51″N 0°23′06″E
- Country: France
- Region: Nouvelle-Aquitaine
- Department: Dordogne
- Arrondissement: Périgueux
- Canton: Ribérac

Government
  - Mayor (2020–2026): Corinne Ducoup
- Area^{1}: 24.91 km^{2} (9.62 sq mi)
- Elevation: 128 m (420 ft)
- Highest elevation: 185 m (607 ft)
- Lowest elevation: 104 m (341 ft)
- Population (2023): 360
  - Density: 14/km^{2} (37/sq mi)
- Time zone: UTC+01:00 (CET)
  - Summer (DST): UTC+02:00 (CEST)
- INSEE/Postal code: 24199 /24320
- ^{1} French Land Register data, which excludes lakes, ponds, glaciers > 1 km^{2} (0.386 sq mi or 247 acres) and river estuaries.

Gout-Rossignol (French pronunciation: [ɡu ʁɔsiɲɔl]; also Goûts-Rossignol; Occitan: Gots e Rossinhòu) is a commune in the Dordogne department in Nouvelle-Aquitaine in southwestern France.

== Population ==
Historical population
Year	Pop.	±% p.a.
1968	481	—
1975	442	−1.20%
1982	444	+0.06%
1990	463	+0.53%
1999	429	−0.84%
2007	415	−0.41%
2012	393	−1.08%
2017	379	−0.72%
2023	360	−0.85%
Source: INSEE

== See also ==
- Communes of the Dordogne department
