= Manoir des Pautis =

Château in Nouvelle-Aquitaine, France

Coordinates: 45°18′14″N 0°49′46″E

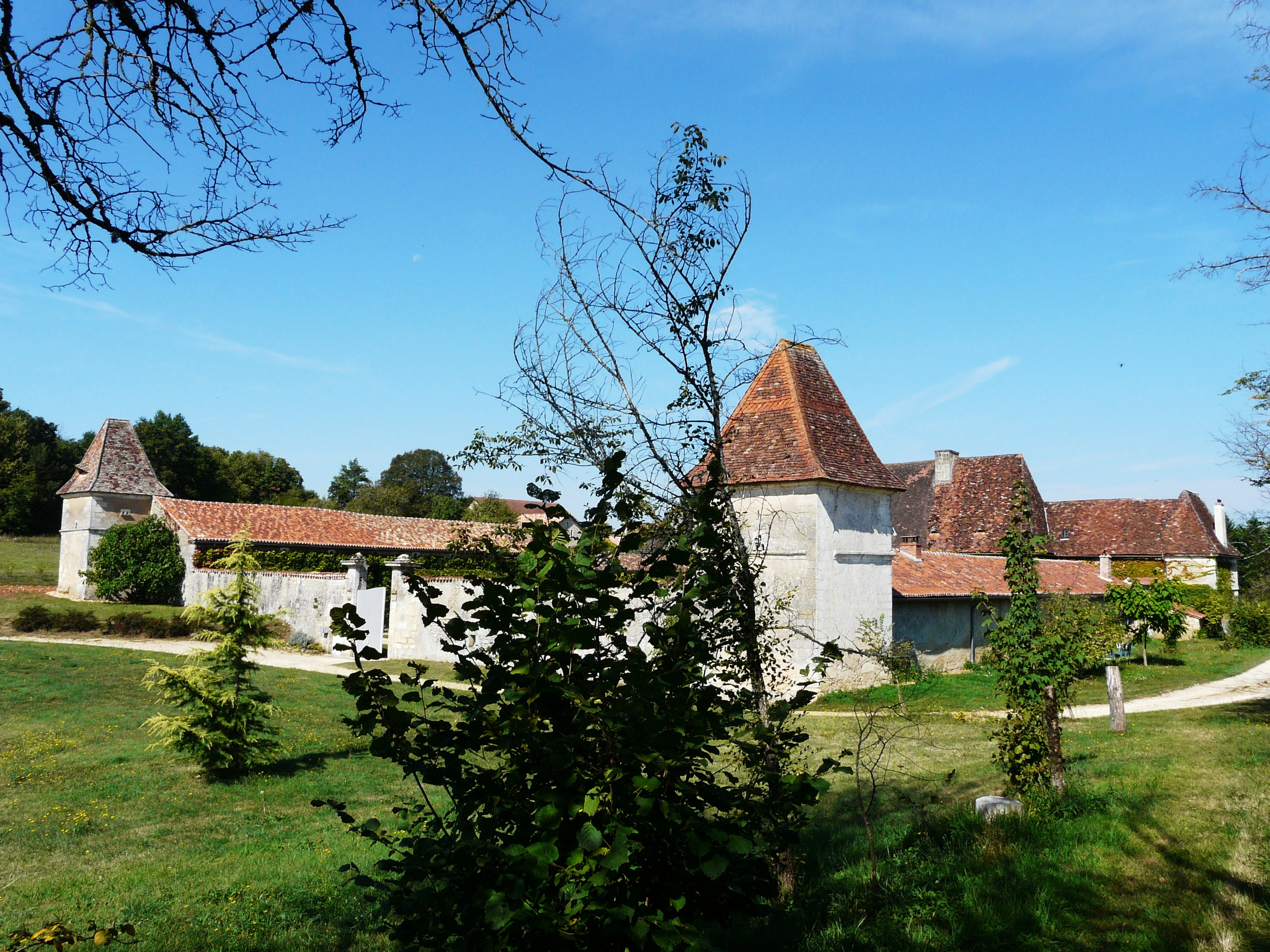

Manoir des Pautis is a château in Dordogne, Nouvelle-Aquitaine, France.
