= Manoir du Chatenet =

Manor house in Dordogne, Aquitaine, France

Coordinates: 45°21′23″N 0°38′48″E

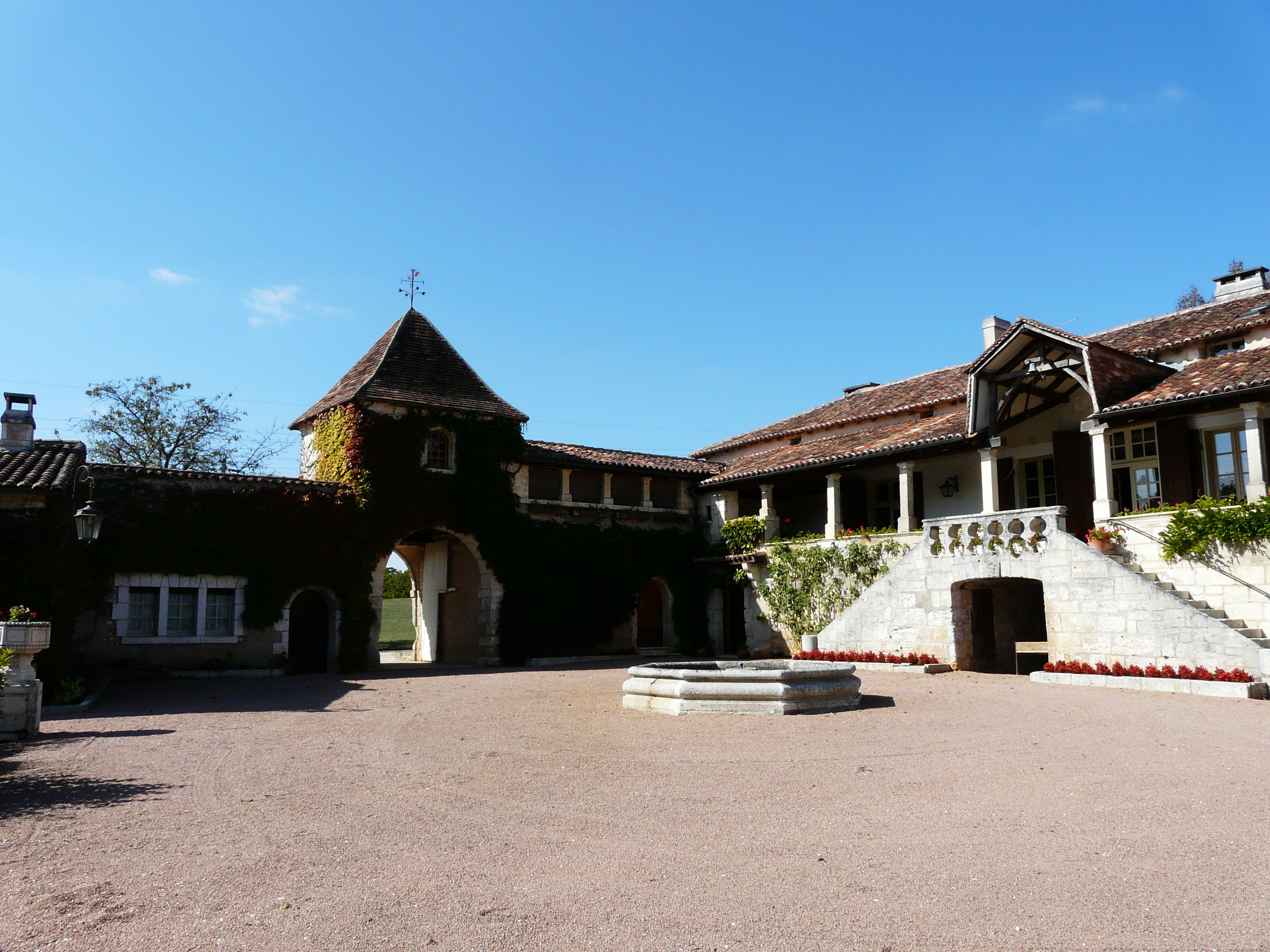

Manoir du Chatenet is a manor house in Dordogne, Aquitaine, France.
