= Cabanes du Breuil =

Farm buildings in Dordogne, France

Coordinates: 44°55′19″N 1°07′34″E

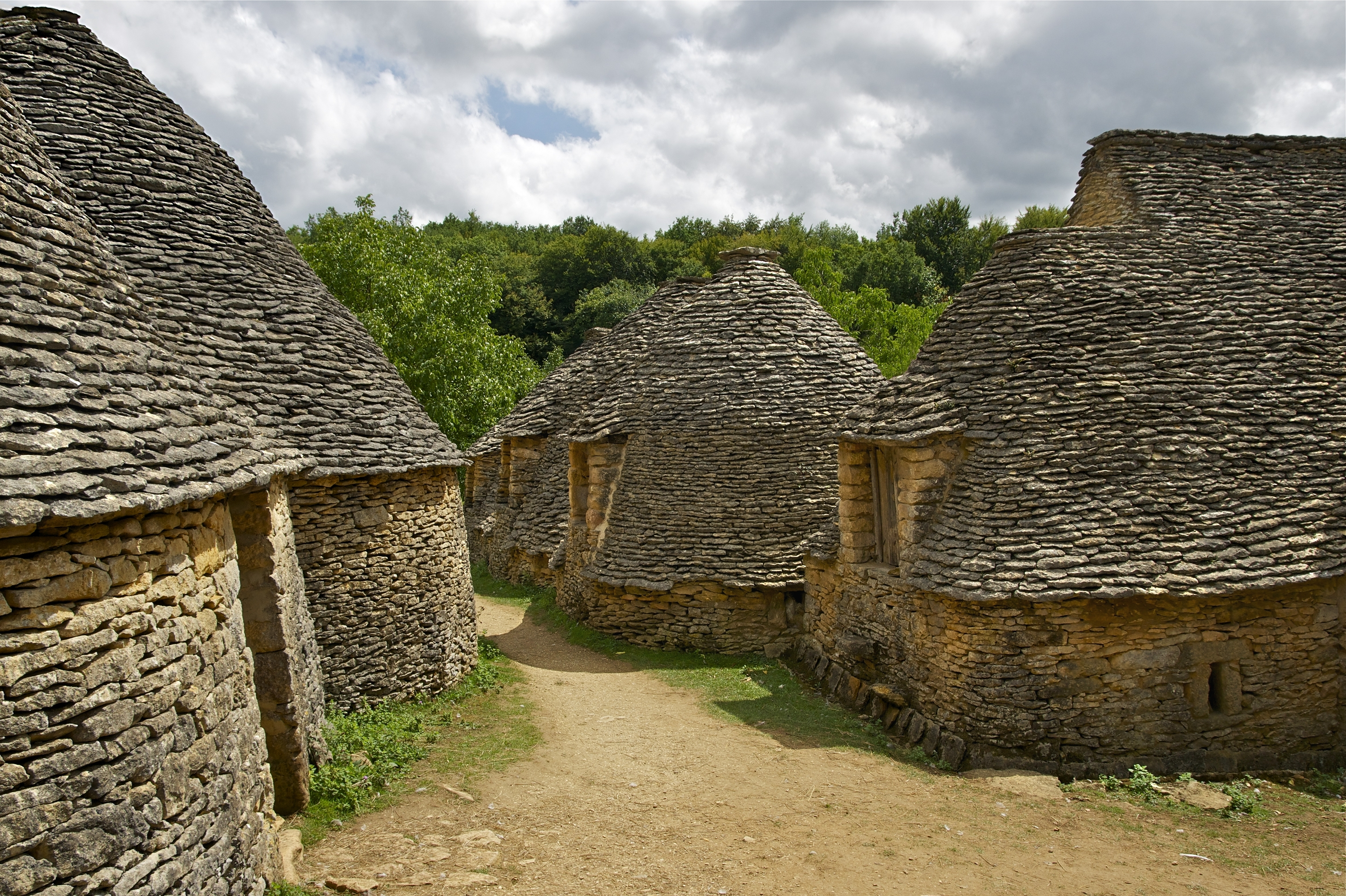
The Cabanes du Breuil at Saint-André-d'Allas.

The designation Cabanes du Breuil (French: [kaban dy bʁœj]) is applied to the former agricultural dependencies of a farm located at the place known as Calpalmas at Saint-André-d'Allas, in the Dordogne department in France. Dating from the 19th century, if not the very early 20th century, these buildings share two distinguishing features, their being covered by a dry stone corbelled vault underneath a roofing of stone tiles and their being in clusters.

== Location ==
The Cabanes du Breuil are located 9 km from Sarlat and 12 km from Les Eyzies, at a place called Calpalmas. They make up the outbuildings of a former agricultural farm comprising a single-storey house with a two-sided roof of stone tiles over wooden trusses, of a type commonly found in the Sarlat region. The farmyard gate bears an inscribed date: 1841.

== How the designation originated ==
According to both Napoleonic and modern-day land registers, the name of the place is not "Le Breuil" but "Calpalmas". "Le Breuil" (also spelt "Le Breuilh") is, to be precise, the name of a nearby hamlet.

The designation "Cabanes du Breuil", although lacking in accuracy, was made popular - whether in its original form or under the variant "Bories du Breuil" - by the local monthly Périgord Magazine in the 1970s, and more generally by regional tourist brochures, not forgetting postcards from the 1980s onwards.

== The Listed Historic Monument ==
Official protection was bestowed on the stone huts following a proposal made by a visitor who was struck with their beauty and uniqueness. First, the site was listed in 1968, then in May 1995, the huts themselves were declared listed buildings (together with the façades and stone roofs of the farmhouse and its bake house).

== Restoration Work ==
On several occasions, the stone huts underwent major restoration work (at the turn of the 1970s and again in the 1990s) (see Jean-Pierre Chavent in Bibliography). A number of alterations were made to roof ridges: the separate roofs of the huts in group 2 were merged over two thirds of their height so as to mimick the undulating ridge of group 1; likewise, the ridge line of the hut leaning against the gable of the bake house, originally a curve and countercurve, was straightened to be made parallel to the ridge of the bake house.

== Date of Building ==
According to the Cabanes du Breuil's Internet site (see External links), "In the Middle Ages, the cabanes du Breuil were inhabited by the Benedictine monks of Sarlat", a proof of this being a sale deed of "1449, the earliest written trace testifying to their presence". However, the alleged deed remains unpublished and its whereabouts and content are unknown. Besides, Calpalmas is a different place from Le Breuil.

In the book "Les cabanes en pierre sèche du Périgord" (The Dry Stone Huts of Périgord) published in 2002 (see Bibliography), the author states that "Le Breuil was once a possession of the Benedictines in the Chapter of Sarlat Bishopric, but nowhere is there any mention that the stone huts we see today already existed." He adds: "Twenty years ago, the landlady used to boast that the stone huts had been built or entirely rebuilt by her grandfather, at the beginning of the 20th century."

Again, according to the Cabanes du Breuil's website, rural craftsmen - a blacksmith, a harness maker and a weaver - are said to have rented some of the huts in order to practise their craft, an assertion that is not borne out by any textual document. In the hut supposedly used by a blacksmith, a pair of bellows sits prominently outside a small hearth. A postcard from the 1970s shows the same building being used as a sheepfold: a dozen sheep are seen leaving it under the guidance of the then farmer and his wife. Another hut was endowed with a faux chimney piece in 1988 so as to display utensils that belonged to the grandparents of the farm's present-day owners.

== Layout of the Buildings ==
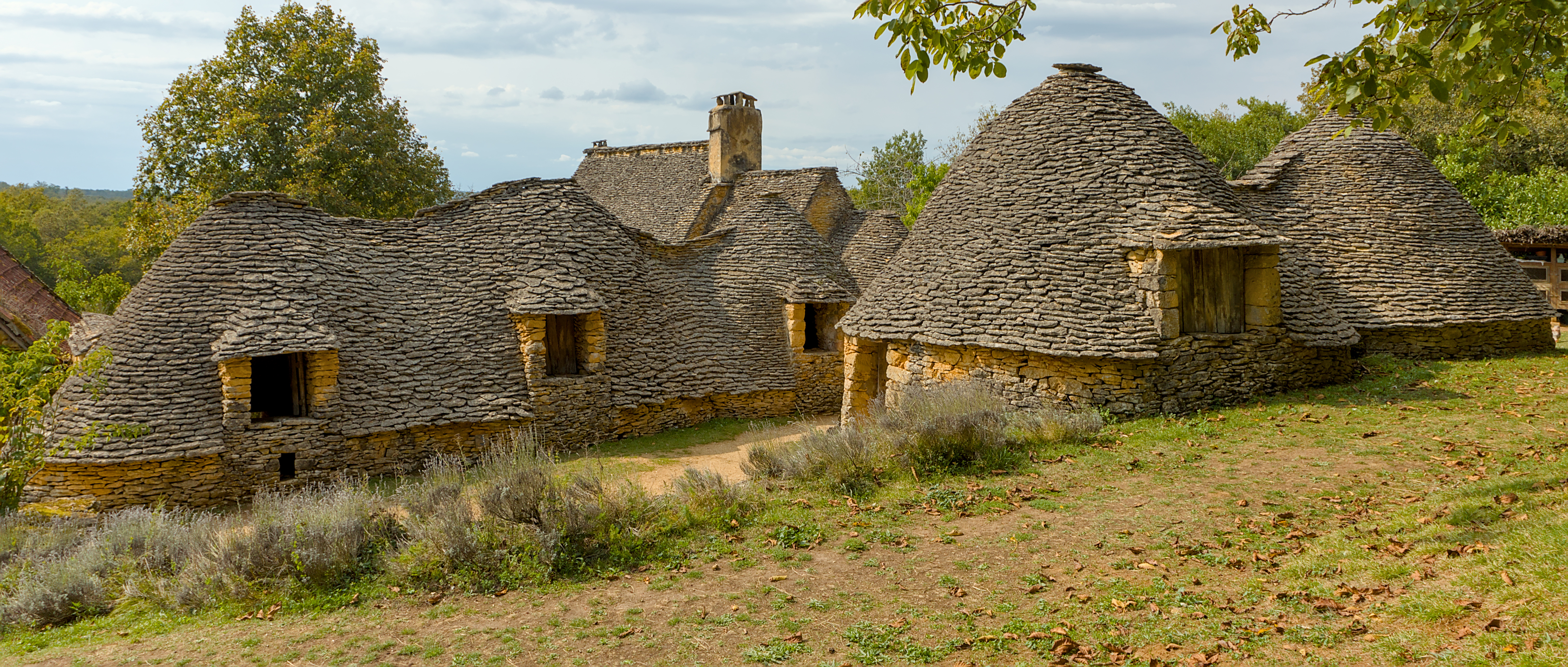
View of several huts.

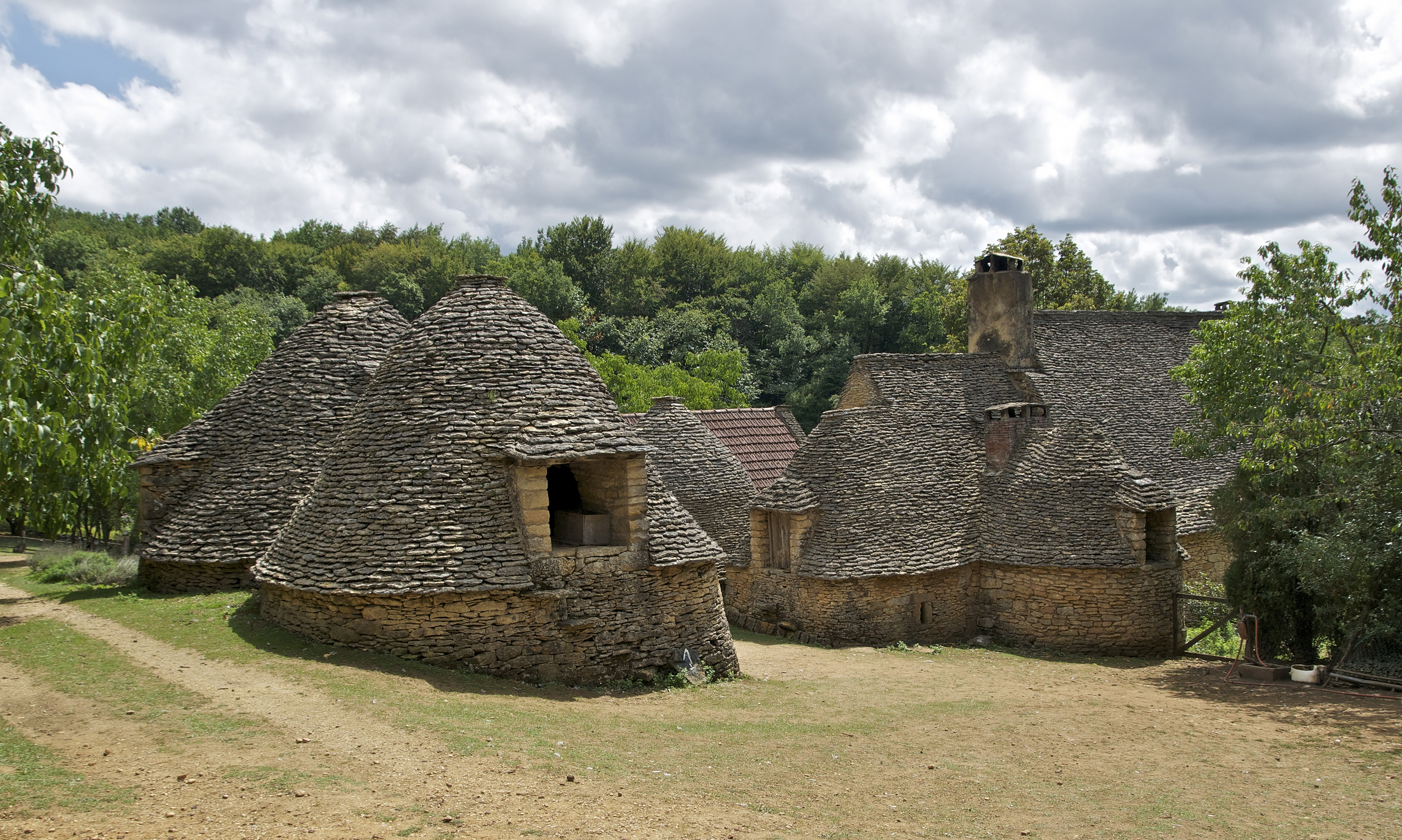
View of several huts.

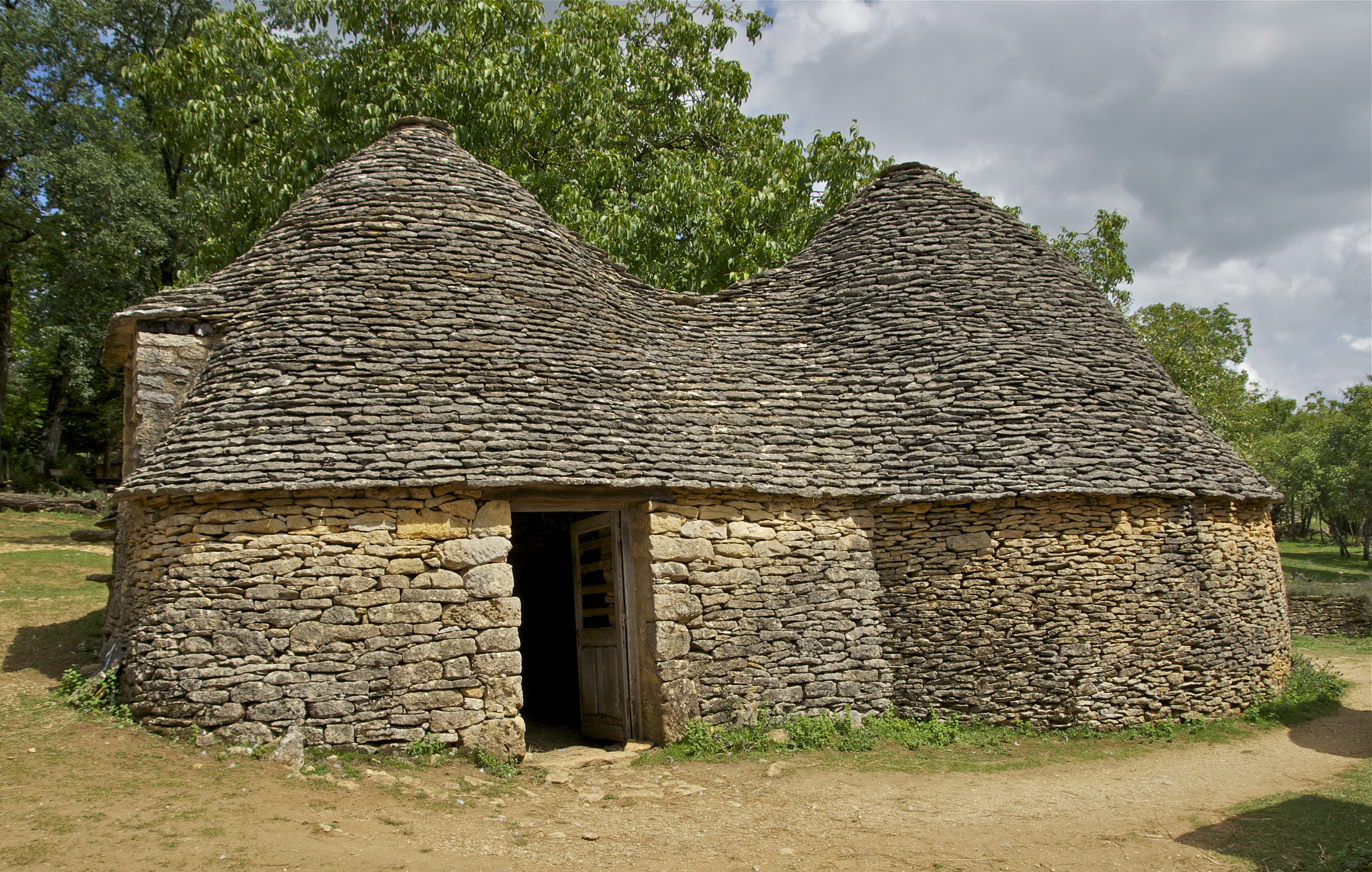
Group 1 of huts.

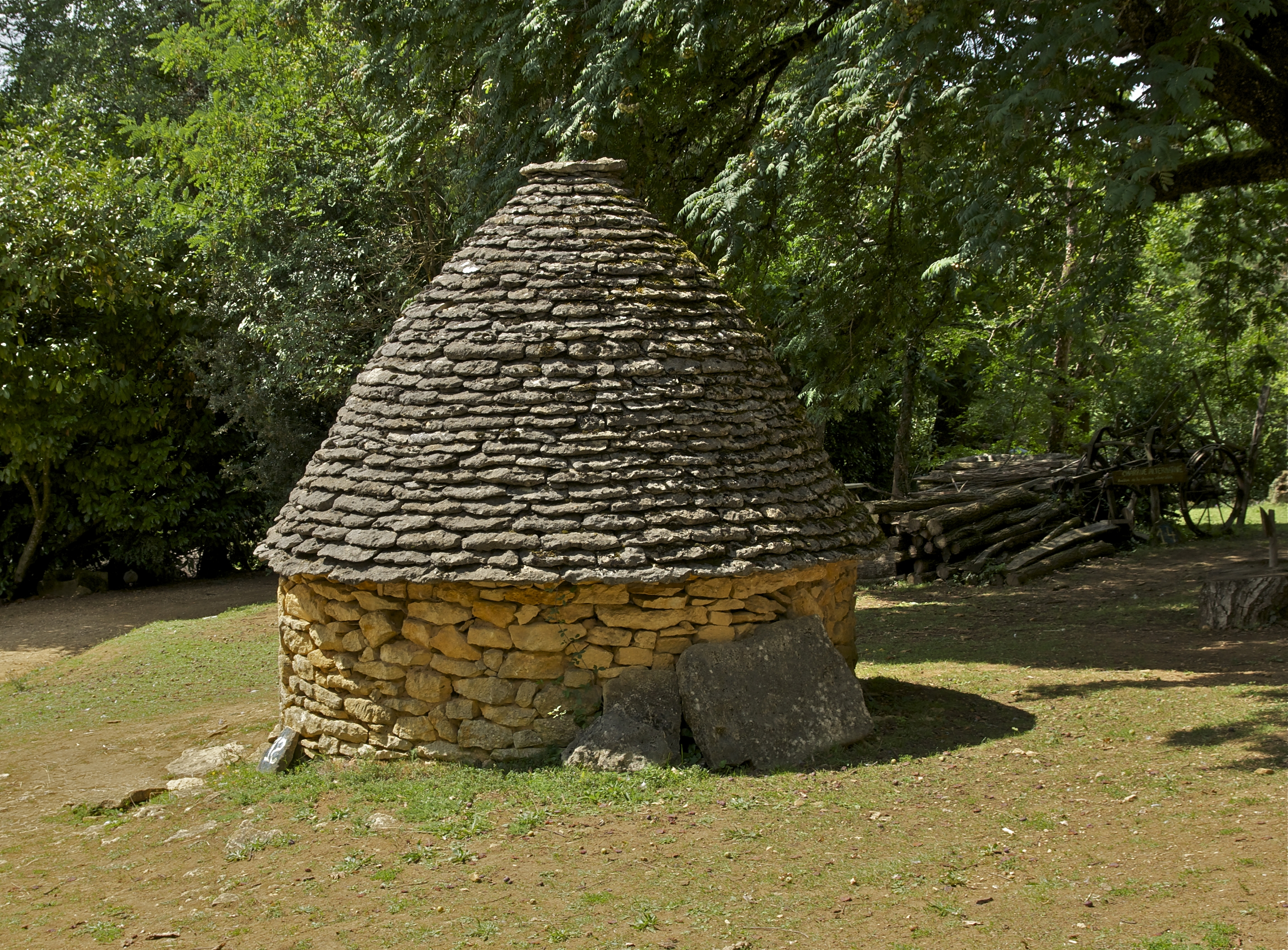
Hut n°12.

A row of five huts arranged in an arc of circle line the uphill side of the farm:

- The first two huts are in fact one and the same building (presumably a hay store), of a rectangular ground plan with rounded corners; a smaller, circular hut abuts its far end; as all three roofs are connected by a curving ridge, one gets the impression of a single structure with threefold roofing.
- The next two huts are set at right angles to each other, the first one abutting on to the gable wall of the bake house, the second one leaning against the latter's side wall (the bake house is a small building with a two-sided roof clad in stone tiles, standing against the farmhouse's gable wall).

A group of two conjoined huts, whose roofs are attached to each other, stands parallel to the first group a few metres up the hill.

Lastly, further up the slope, two isolated huts, one small, the other bigger, plus a third, smaller one at the entrance to the site.

== Architecture ==
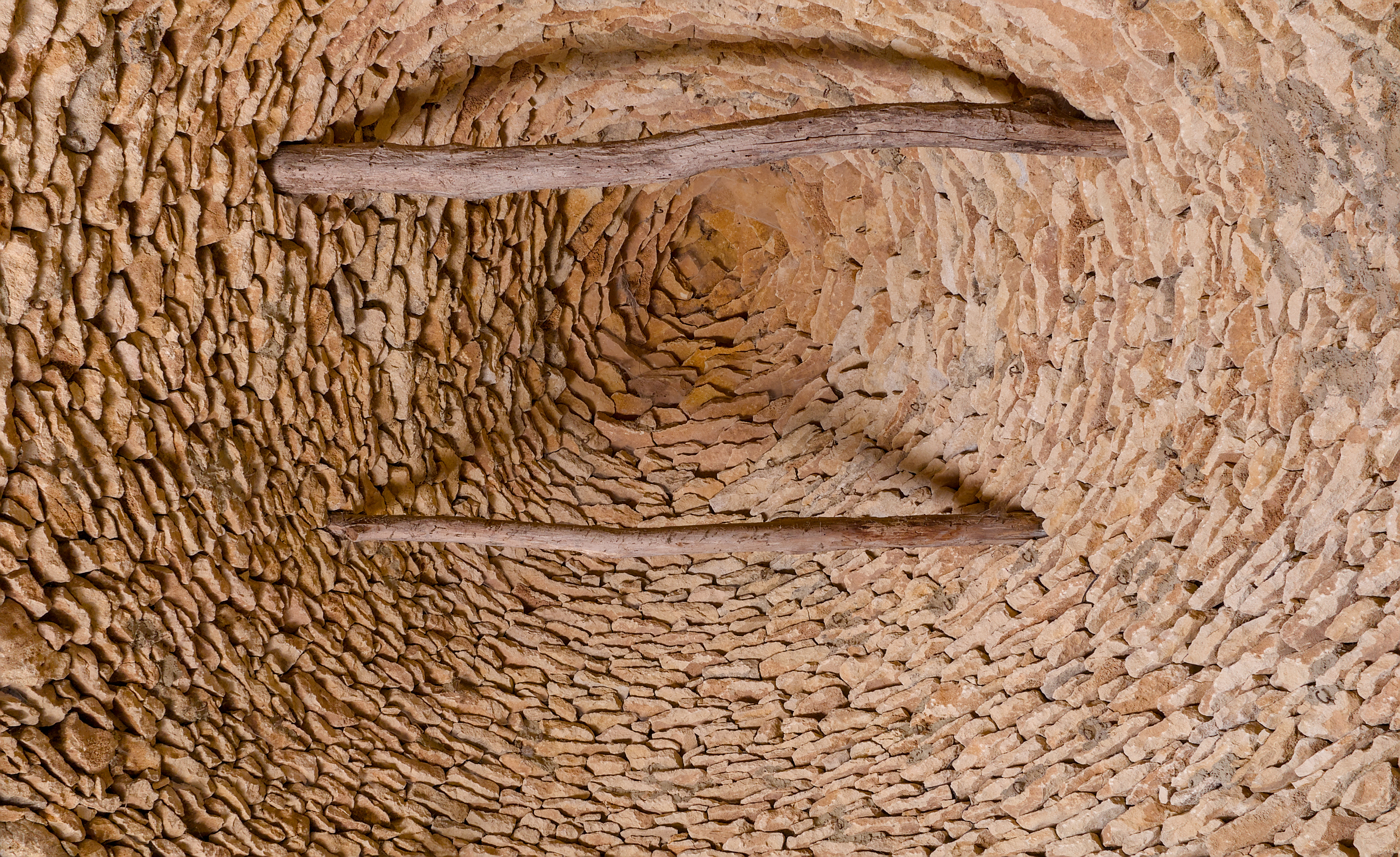
Interior view of a vault.

From an architectural and morphological point of view, each hut consists of three different parts:

- a base of stones laid with earth mortar (not to be confused with dry stone walling);
- a vault of corbelled and outward-inclining stones;
- over the vaulting, a bell-shaped roof of stone tiles with outward-flaring eaves.

Because of the slope, the uphill roof eaves are nearly at ground level.

Entrances look downhill and extend all the way up to the roof eaves. Their uprights are made of dressed stones alternating as headers and stretchers. They are capped by outer and inner wooden lintels, right under the eaves. They are fitted with a wooden door.

Each roof is adorned with a large dormer window (or hay window) with mortared stone jambs and a projecting roof supported by outer and inner wooden lintels. There is a break in the eaves right under each dormer. A number of windows can be accessed (presumably by poultry) through a flight of three or four projecting stones laid into the wall beneath.

Each roof is capped by a large, circularly carved stone slab.

Inside the huts, at the height where corbelling starts, wooden beams serve as a rudimentary upper floor.

In their forms and techniques, the stone huts show an outstanding architectural unity, a likely hint that they belong to one and the same period or are the work of one and the same craftsman. Architecturally speaking, they are similar to the stone huts with conical or bell-shaped roofs that can be seen in other parts of the Sarlat region and hark back to a building campaign extending from the mid 18th century to the late 19th century.

== The Backdrop to Films ==
The place has been made popular not only by postcards but also by films and TV series: it is said to have been a filming location - prior to 1990 - for La Belle au bois dormant (Sleeping Beauty), Jacquou le Croquant (Peasant Jacquou) (Stellio Lorenzi's TV version), D'Artagnan, and Les Misérables (Robert Hossein's film version).

== Visits ==
The place is open to visitors all year round.

== Bibliography ==
- Jean-Pierre Chavent, Les bories du Périgord, in Quercy-Magazine, N. 18, December 1971, pages 25–29.
- René Dechère, Les huttes du Périgord — de la préhistoire à nos jours, l'auteur, Saint-Cyprien, 1981, 88 pages.
- Jean-Claude Carrère, Cabanes du Périgord, mythes et réalités, in Périgord-Magazine, N. 190, November 1981, pages 17–19.
- Des « bories » pour mémoire, in La France agricole, 28 September 1990.
- François Poujardieu, Les cabanes en pierre sèche du Périgord, Editions du Roc de Bourzac, 2002, 107 p., in particular pages 43–44.
- Jean-Marc Caron, Cabanes paysannes en Périgord. Architecture paysanne de pierre sèche au 19th century, La Geste, collection "Beau petit pays", 2022,295 p.
