= Château Saulnier =

Historic monument in Dordogne, Nouvelle-Aquitaine, France

Coordinates: 45°28′16″N 0°43′32″E

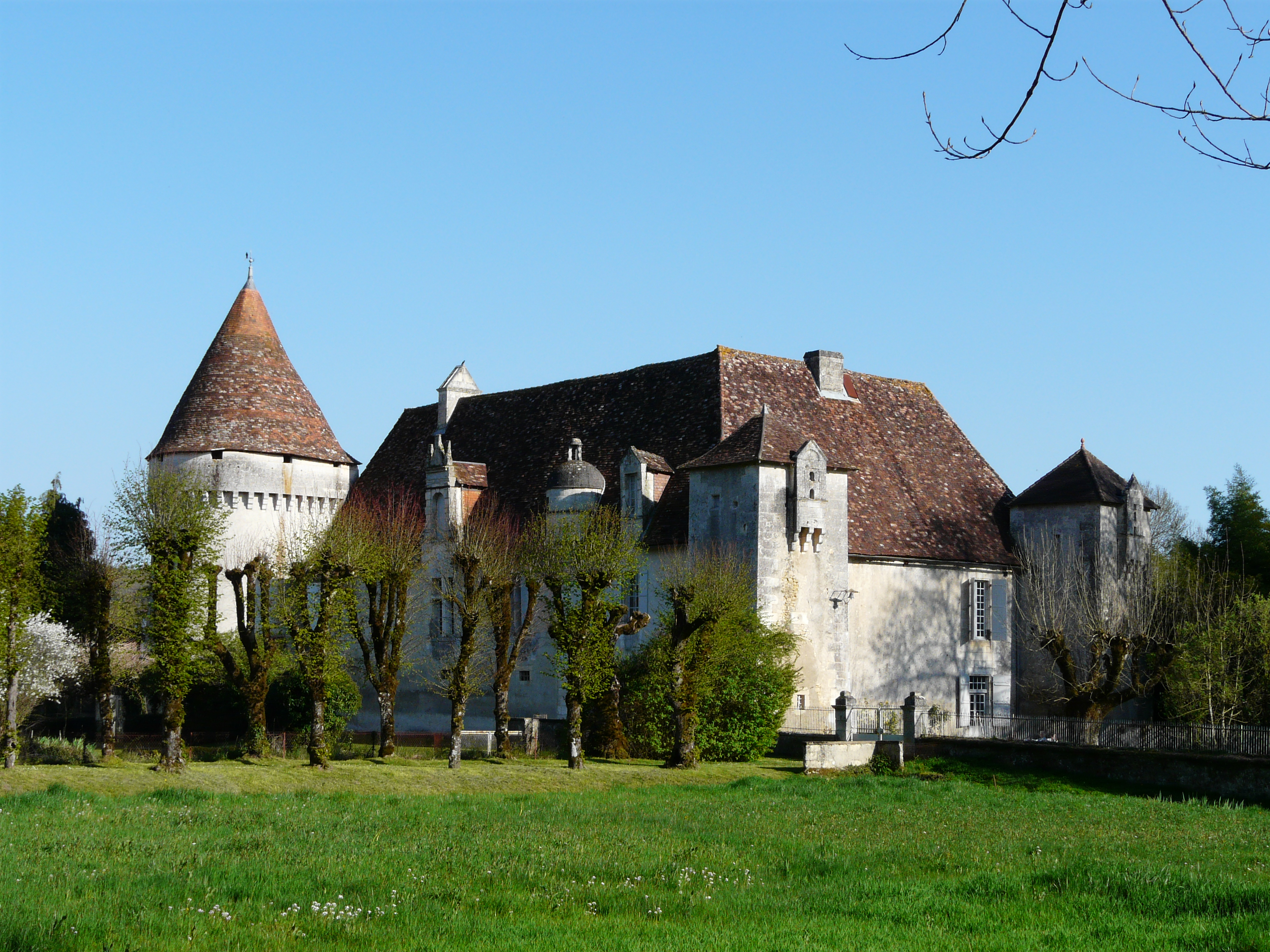

Château Saulnier is a château in Dordogne, Nouvelle-Aquitaine, France. It became a Historic Monument in 1969.
