= Arrondissements of the Dordogne department =

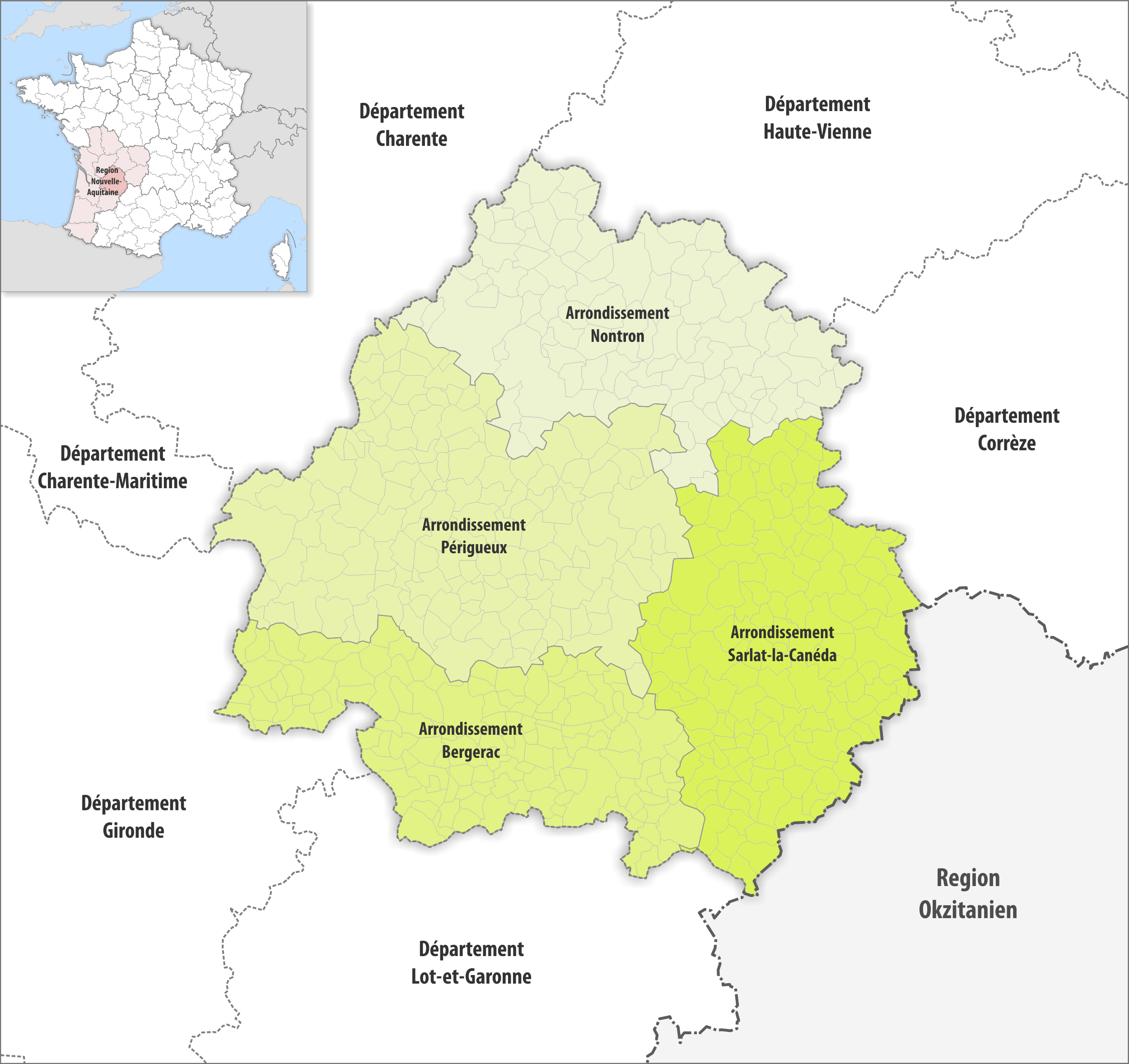
Map of arrondissements of the Dordogne department.

The 4 arrondissements of the Dordogne department are:

1. Arrondissement of Bergerac, (subprefecture: Bergerac) with 130 communes. The population of the arrondissement was 102,530 in 2021.
2. Arrondissement of Nontron, (subprefecture: Nontron) with 94 communes. The population of the arrondissement was 54,127 in 2021.
3. Arrondissement of Périgueux, (prefecture of the Dordogne department: Périgueux) with 143 communes. The population of the arrondissement was 175,870 in 2021.
4. Arrondissement of Sarlat-la-Canéda, (subprefecture: Sarlat-la-Canéda) with 136 communes. The population of the arrondissement was 81,203 in 2021.

== History ==
In 1800 the arrondissements of Périgueux, Bergerac, Nontron, Ribérac and Sarlat were established. The arrondissement of Ribérac was disbanded in 1926.

The borders of the arrondissements of Dordogne were modified in January 2017:

- 21 communes from the arrondissement of Bergerac to the arrondissement of Périgueux
- one commune from the arrondissement of Bergerac to the arrondissement of Sarlat-la-Canéda
- 28 communes from the arrondissement of Périgueux to the arrondissement of Nontron
- 22 communes from the arrondissement of Périgueux to the arrondissement of Sarlat-la-Canéda
