= Manoir de Mitonias =

Château in Nouvelle-Aquitaine, France

Coordinates: 45°24′18″N 0°24′09″E

Manoir de Mitonias is a château in Dordogne, Nouvelle-Aquitaine, France.
