= Château de La Besse =

Château in Nouvelle-Aquitaine, France

Coordinates: 45°07′55″N 0°55′18″E

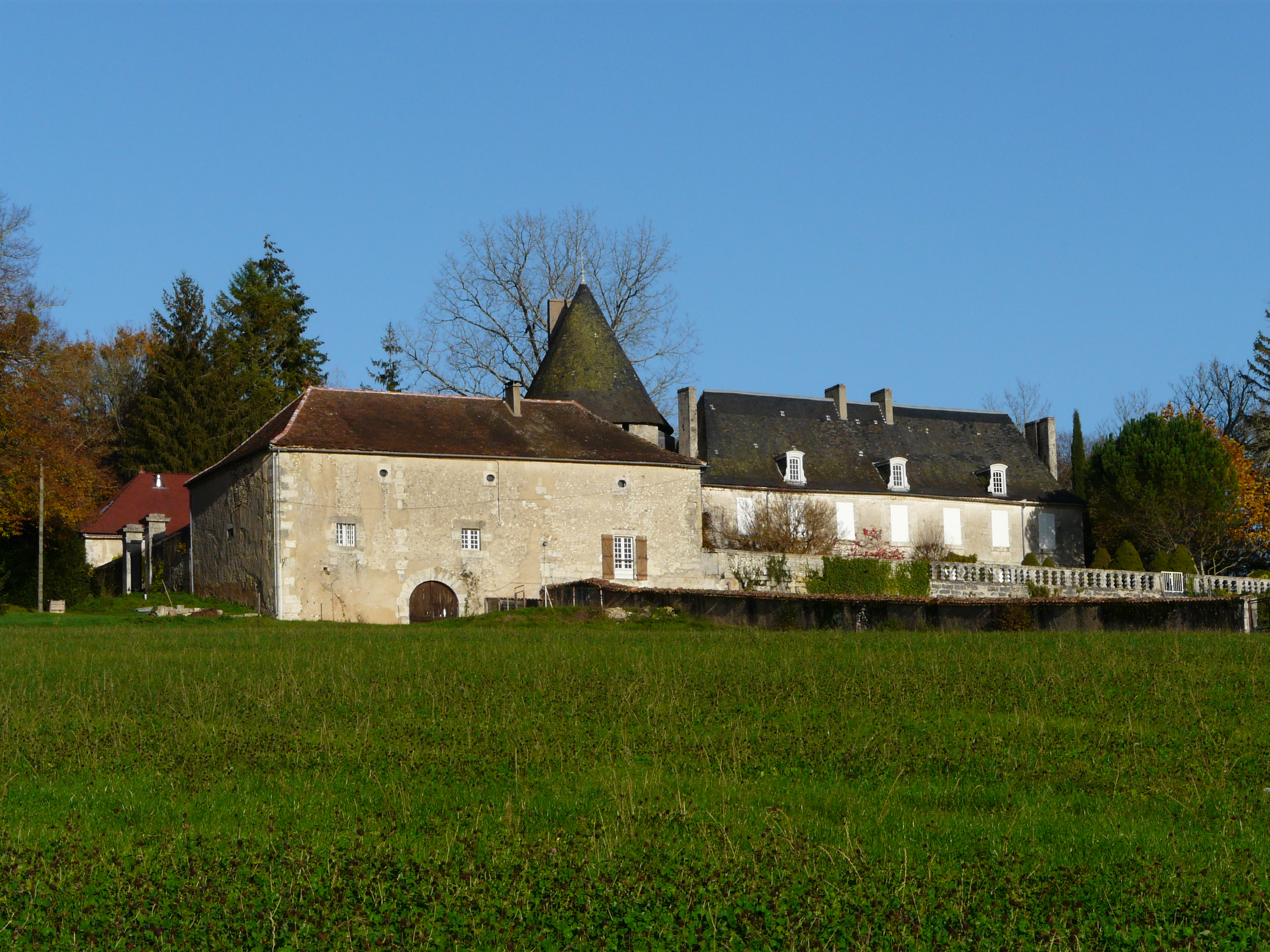
The château

The Château de La Besse is a château in Milhac-d'Auberoche, Dordogne, Nouvelle-Aquitaine, France.
