= Manoir de la Vermondie =

Coordinates: 45°01′46″N 1°05′43″E

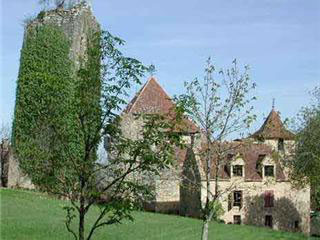

Manoir de la Vermondie is a château in Dordogne, Nouvelle-Aquitaine, France. It became a Historic Monument in 1948.

As of 2014, it was on sale for c£5M.
