= Château de Pécany =

Castle in Nouvelle-Aquitaine, France

Coordinates: 44°47′20″N 0°25′29″E

The Château de Pécany is a castle located in the commune of Pomport, in the Dordogne Valley in France. It was built by the de Courssou family in 1780 and has a history of wine production. As of 2024 it is partially used as a concert venue.

== History ==
The château was built in 1780 on the foundations of an older structure that probably dates to the 16th century. In 1840 it was modified to add two towers and a large central staircase.

Located in one of the oldest wine growing regions in France, Château Pécany had a small vineyard for producing house wine. With excellent terrain, soil, and environment, this vineyard developed a reputation for producing some of the best wines of the region.

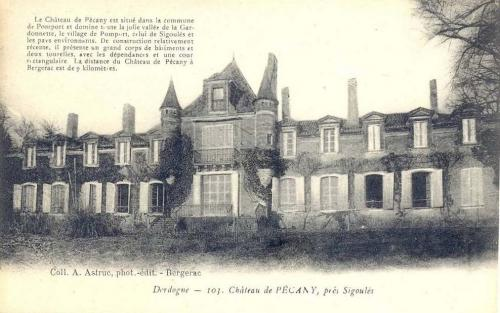
Postcard depicting Château de Pécany

Jean Siegler, a second cousin to the de Courssou family, bought the property in 1926, and, over time, enlarged the vineyard by buying surrounding land and plantation rights. The Pécany wine was first offered for commercial sale during this time.

The château and vineyards remained in the Siegler family until, in the spring of 1973, a local farmer and vintner Jean Saladin bought most of the vineyards for his son Gérard Saladin. Under G. Saladin's relatively poor management and lack of attention, the quality of the vinification gradually decreased until, in 1998, Gérard Saladin opted to convert to the less time-consuming, and less profitable, path of selling bulk wine to the local vintners co-operative. In more recent years, G. Saladin did not vinify any wine, but instead sold the Pécany grapes in bulk.

In 1990, Château Pécany, but not the surrounding vineyards, was brought under the proprietorship of a single owner when Marie-France Siegler purchased the chateau from her siblings.
