= Dordogne =

Department of France in Nouvelle-Aquitaine

Dordogne Dordonha (Occitan)
- Department
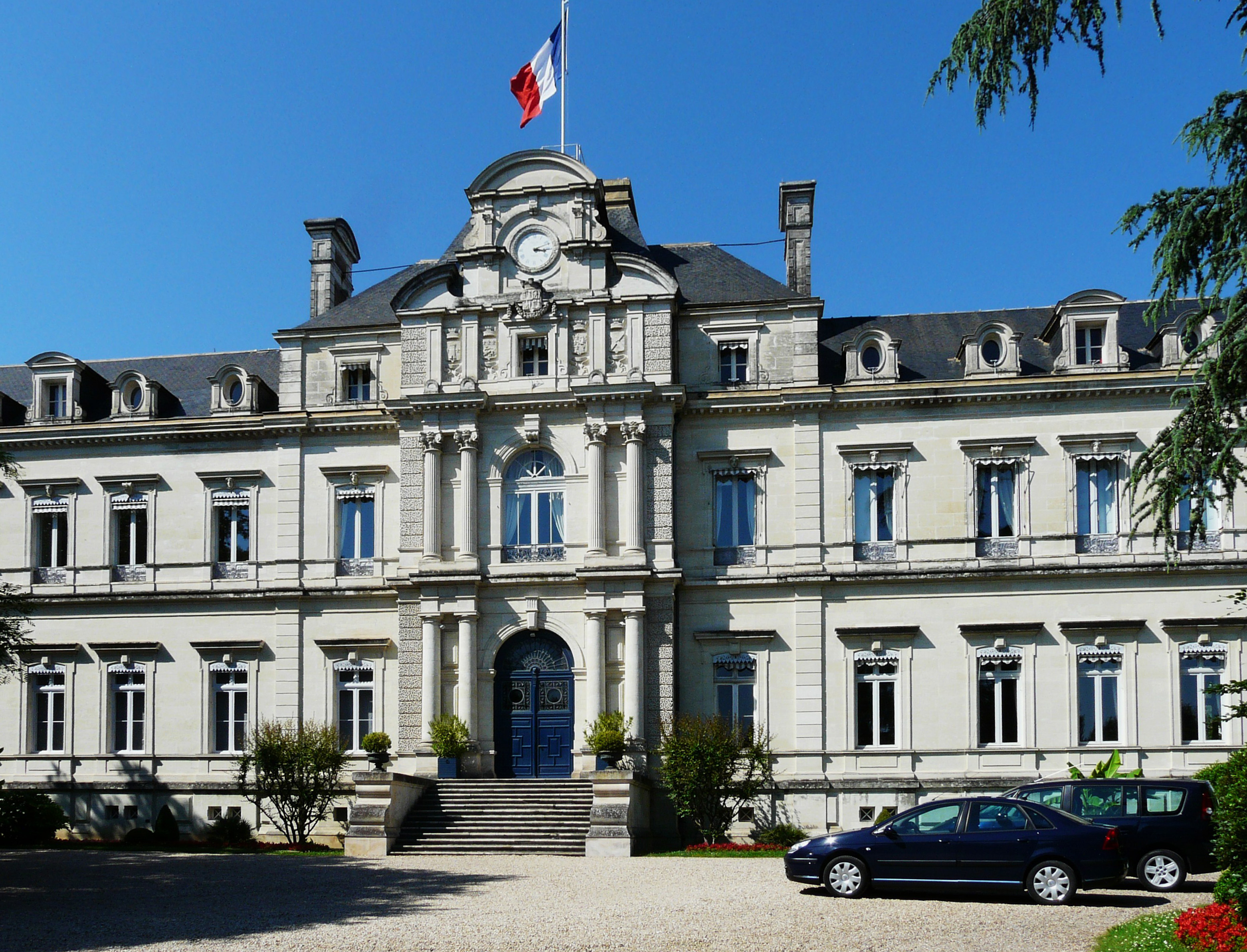
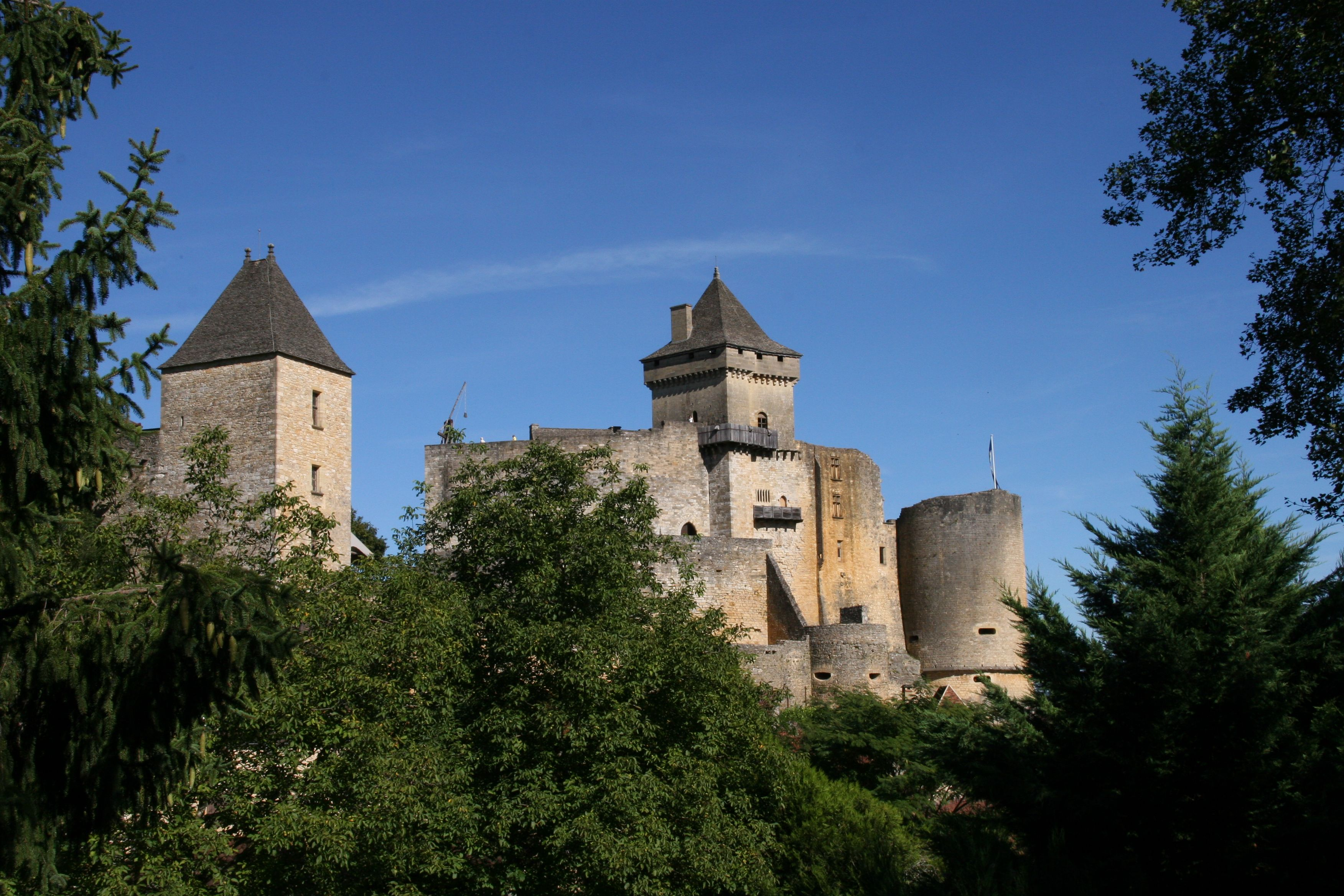
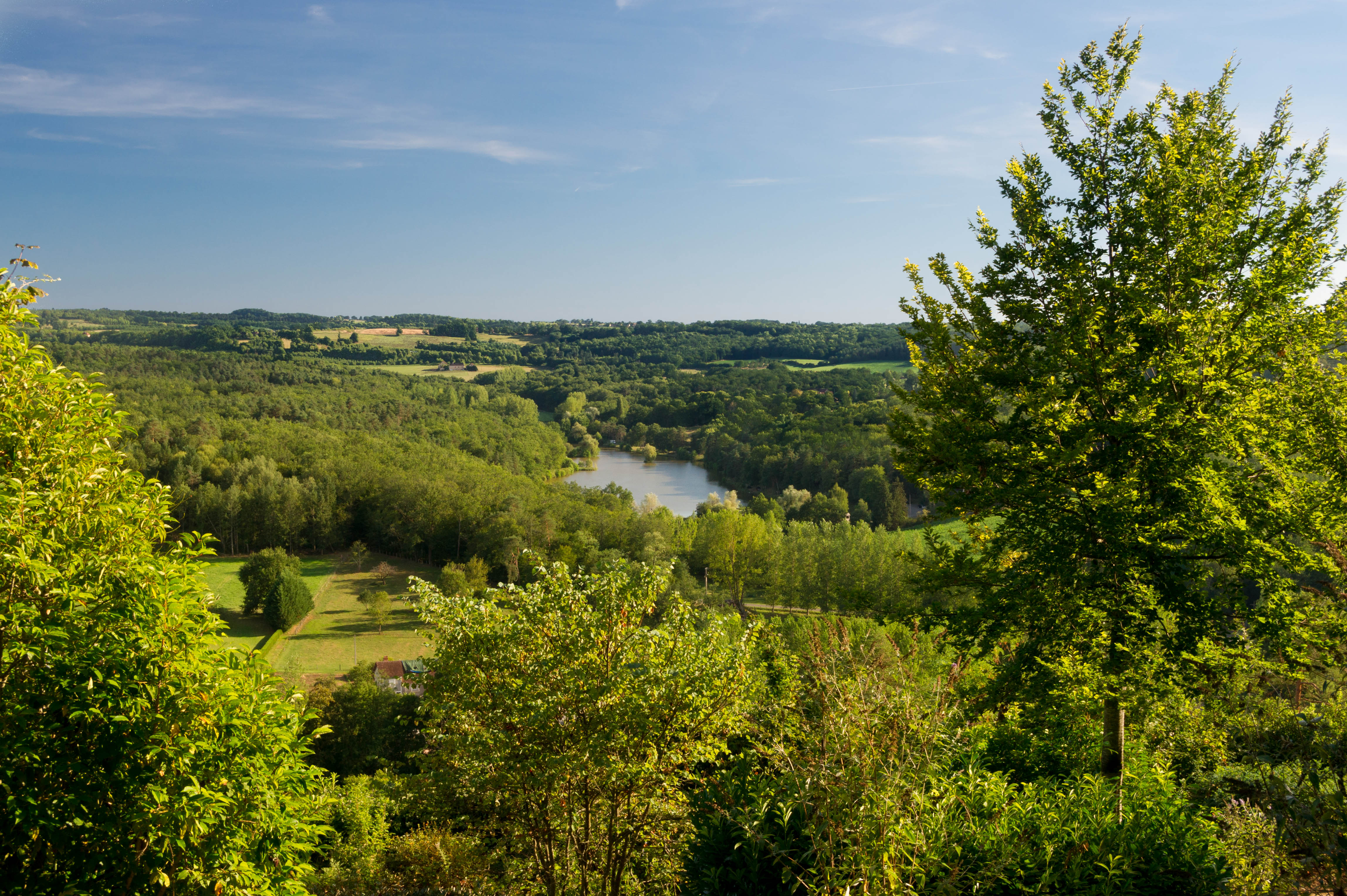
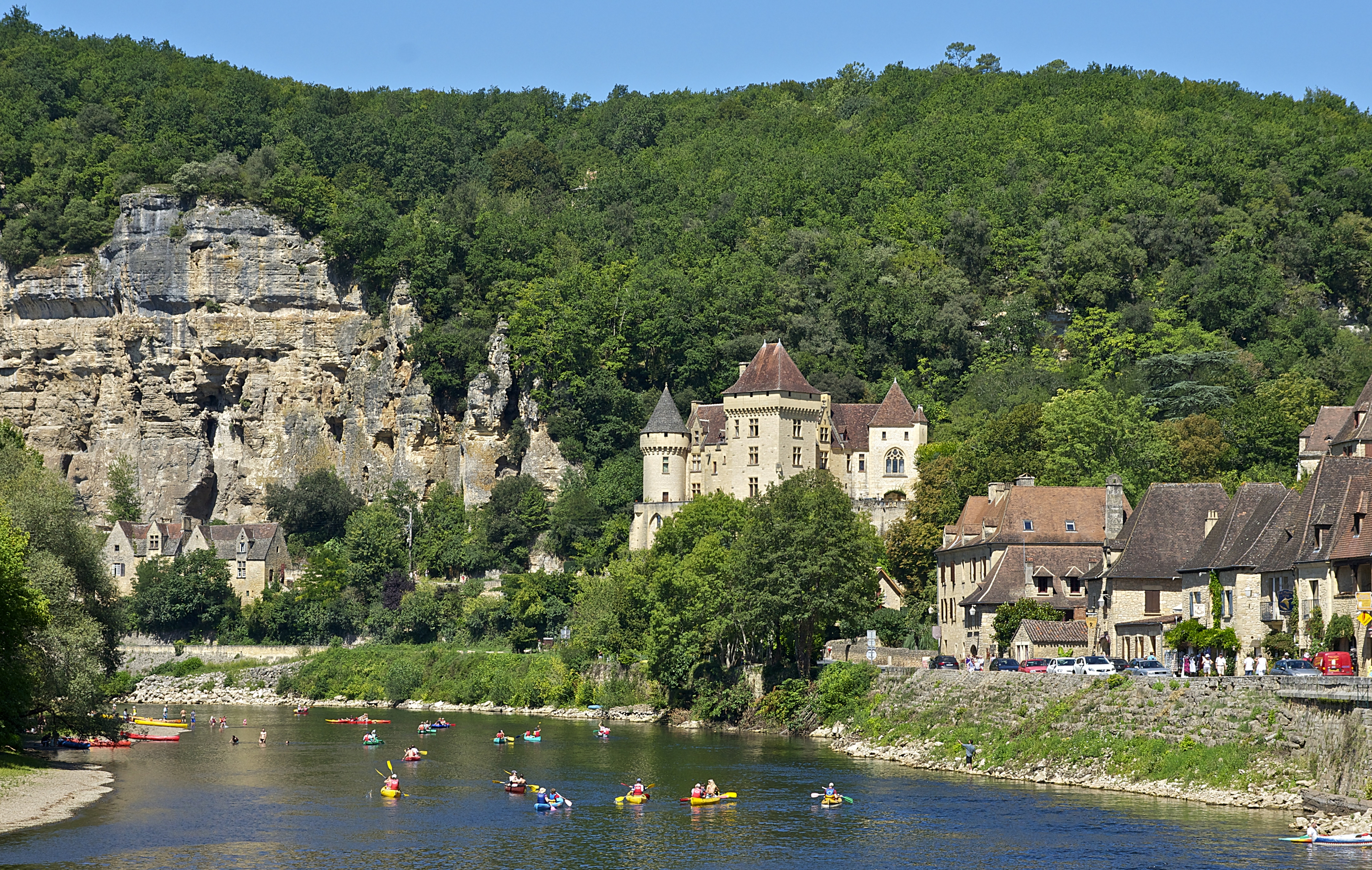
- From top down, left to right: prefecture building in Périgueux, Château de Castelnaud-la-Chapelle, river Lourde and La Roque-Gageac

- Flag Coat of arms

- Location of Dordogne in France
- Coordinates: 45°0′N 0°40′E
- Country: France
- Region: Nouvelle-Aquitaine
- Prefecture: Périgueux
- Subprefectures: Bergerac; Nontron; Sarlat-la-Canéda

Government
  - President of the Departmental Council: Germinal Peiro (PS)

Area^{1}
  - Total: 9,060 km^{2} (3,500 sq mi)

Population (2023)
  - Total: 417,614
  - Rank: 60th
  - Density: 46.1/km^{2} (119/sq mi)
- Time zone: UTC+1 (CET)
  - Summer (DST): UTC+2 (CEST)
- ISO 3166 code: FR-24
- Department number: 24
- Arrondissements: 4
- Cantons: 25
- Communes: 503
- ^1 French Land Register data, which exclude estuaries and lakes, ponds and glaciers larger than 1 km^{2}

Dordogne (UK: /dɔːrˈdɔɪn/ dor-DOYN, US: /dɔːrˈdoʊn/ dor-DOHN or /dɔːrˈdɔːnjə/ dor-DAWN-yə; French: [dɔʁdɔɲ]; Occitan: Dordonha [duɾˈduɲɔ]) is a large rural department in southwest France, with its prefecture in Périgueux. Located in the Nouvelle-Aquitaine region roughly half-way between the Loire Valley and the Pyrenees, it is named after the river Dordogne, which runs through it. It corresponds roughly to the ancient county of Périgord. In January 2023, Dordogne had a population of 417,614.

== History ==
The county of Périgord dates back to when the area was inhabited by ancient Celtic Gaulish tribes. It was originally home to four tribes, and since "four tribes" in the Gaulish language is "Petrocore", the area eventually became known as the county of Le Périgord. Its inhabitants became known as the Périgordins (or Périgourdins), and there are four Périgords in the Dordogne.

- Périgord Vert (Green Périgord), with its main town of Nontron, consists of verdant valleys in a region crossed by many rivers and streams.
- Périgord Blanc (White Périgord), situated around the department's capital of Périgueux, is a region of limestone plateaux, wide valleys, and meadows.
- Périgord Pourpre (Purple Périgord) with its capital of Bergerac, is a wine region.
- Périgord Noir (Black Périgord) surrounding the administrative centre of Sarlat, overlooks the valleys of the Vézère and the Dordogne, and takes its name from the nearby oak and pine forests.

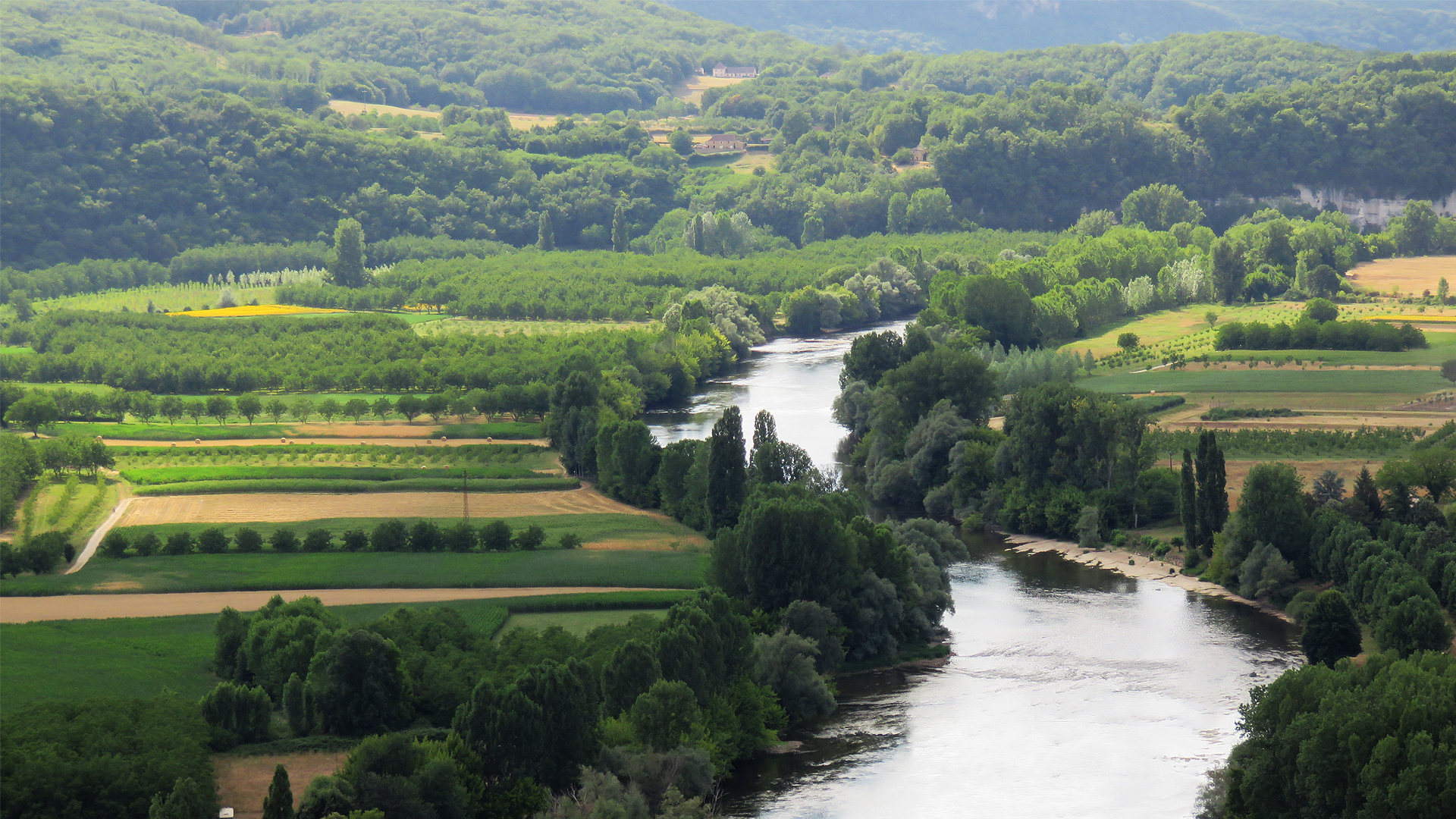

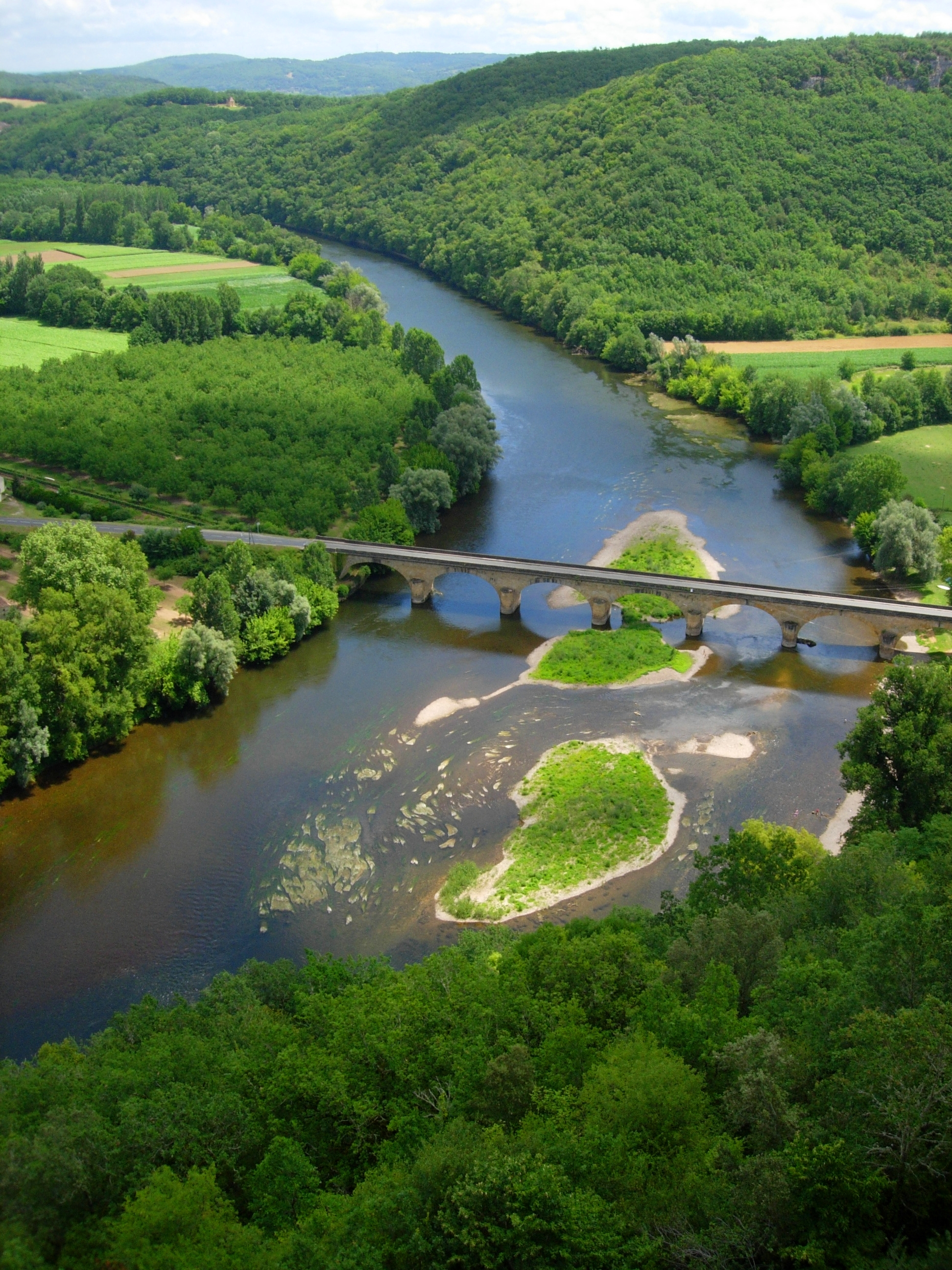
The river Dordogne near Castelnaud-la-Chapelle

The Petrocores took part in the resistance against the Roman occupation of Gaul. Concentrated in a few major sites are the vestiges of the Gallo-Roman period – the gigantic ruined tower and arenas in Périgueux (formerly Vesone), the Périgord museum's archaeological collections, villa remains in Montcaret, and the Roman tower of La Rigale Castle in Villetoureix. The earliest cluzeaux (artificial caves either above or below ground) can be found throughout the Dordogne. These subterranean refuges and lookout huts were large enough to shelter entire local populations. According to Julius Caesar, the Gauls took refuge in these caves during the resistance.

After Guienne province was transferred to the English Crown under the Plantagenets following the remarriage of Eleanor of Aquitaine in 1152, Perigord was transferred to English suzerainty. Being situated at the boundaries of influence of the monarchies of France and England, it oscillated between the two dynasties for more than three hundred years of struggle until the end of the Hundred Years' War in 1453. The county was torn apart, which modelled its physiognomy.

During the calmer periods of the late 15th and early 16th centuries, the Castillon plain on the banks of the Dordogne saw developments in urban architecture. Fine Gothic and Renaissance residences were constructed in Périgueux, Bergerac, and Sarlat. In the countryside, the nobility erected the majority of more than 1200 châteaux, manors and country houses. In the second half of the 16th century, however, as war waged in the region, attacks, pillaging, and fires of the Wars of Religion reached a pinnacle of violence, which was partly focused on Périgord. At the time, Bergerac was one of the most powerful Huguenot strongholds, along with La Rochelle. Following these wars, Périgord, fief of Henry of Navarre, was to return to the Crown for good and would continue to suffer from the various political changes of the French nation, from the Revolution to the dark days of the French Resistance.

Associated with the region are several important literary figures: Arnaut Daniel, Bertran de Born, Michel de Montaigne, Étienne de La Boétie, Brantôme, Fénelon, Maine de Biran, Eugene Le Roy, and André Maurois; as well as Talleyrand, Saint-Exupéry and Biron.

In addition to its castles, châteaux, churches, bastides, and cave fortresses, the Périgord region has preserved a number of ancient villages which retain their market halls, dovecotes, bories (stone huts), and abbeys. Saint-Léon-sur-Vézère, Connezac, Saint-Jean-de-Côle, La Roque-Gageac, and many others contain important and visually interesting architectural examples. The old quarters of Périgueux or Bergerac have been restored and developed into pedestrian areas. A number of small towns, such as Brantôme, Issigeac, Eymet and Mareuil, have withstood the changes of modern times. A special mention should be made in this respect to Sarlat and its Black Périgord area.

Dordogne is one of the original 83 departments created on 4 March 1790 during the French Revolution. It was created from the former province of Périgord, the county of Périgord. Its borders continued to change over subsequent decades.

In 1793 the communes of Boisseuilh, Coubjours, Génis, Payzac, Saint-Cyr-les-Champagnes, Saint-Mesmin, Salagnac, Savignac, Saint-Trié and Teillots were transferred from Corrèze to Dordogne.

In 1794 Dordogne ceded Cavarc to Lot-et-Garonne. Later in 1794 (albeit during the subsequent year under the Republican Calendar in use at the time), Dordogne gained Parcoul from Charente-Inférieure.

Following the restoration, in 1819, the commune of Bonrepos was suppressed and merged with the adjacent commune of Souillac in Lot.

In 1870, the region was witness to the tragic Hautefaye incident, which occurred shortly after France's declaration of war against Prussia. A young aristocrat named Alain de Monéys was brutally tortured and then burned alive by a crowd of between 300 and 800 people on 16 August in a public square in the village of Hautefaye in the north-west region of the department. Details of the incident are gruesome, but remain unclear: the leading participants appear to have been drunk. Additionally, since the incident occurred prior to the introduction of mass education, most of the witnesses would have been unable (and possibly unwilling) to write down what they had seen. But at some stage the victim died, and following a trial four individuals identified as culpable were in turn condemned to die by guillotine. The sentence was carried out in the same public square on 13 February 1871.

It was suggested that the victim had reported some (bad) news regarding the ongoing war in a way that implied support for the enemy, although subsequently it became clear that his patriotic credentials were beyond reproach. It was also suggested that the mob had been antagonised when he called out, "Vive la République!" (Long live the republic) at a time when the patriotic villagers valued the imperial regime, which Parisian revolutionaries were in the process of destroying. This incident has been studied by historian Alain Corbin, among others.

== Geography ==
The department is part of the region of Nouvelle-Aquitaine and is surrounded by the six départements of Haute-Vienne, Corrèze, Lot, Lot-et-Garonne, Gironde, Charente-Maritime, and Charente. Dordogne is the third-largest department of metropolitan France, as well as the largest landlocked department in the country. In total area, it is larger than Cyprus and smaller than Cape Verde.

=== Principal towns ===
The most populous commune is Périgueux, the prefecture. As of 2023, there are nine communes with more than 5,000 inhabitants:

Commune	Population (2023)
Périgueux	29,055
Bergerac	27,110
Boulazac Isle Manoire	10,759
Sarlat-la-Canéda	8,763
Coulounieix-Chamiers	7,832
Trélissac	7,372
Terrasson-Lavilledieu	6,218
Montpon-Ménestérol	5,866
Saint-Astier	5,376

== Demographics ==
Historical population

Year	Pop.	±% p.a.
1791	433,343	—
1801	409,475	−0.56%
1806	424,113	+0.70%
1821	453,136	+0.44%
1831	482,750	+0.64%
1841	490,263	+0.15%
1851	505,789	+0.31%
1861	501,687	−0.08%
1872	480,141	−0.40%
1881	495,037	+0.34%
1891	478,471	−0.34%
1901	452,951	−0.55%
1911	437,432	−0.35%
1921	396,742	−0.97%

Year	Pop.	±% p.a.
1931	383,720	−0.33%
1936	386,963	+0.17%
1946	387,643	+0.02%
1954	377,870	−0.32%
1962	375,455	−0.08%
1968	374,073	−0.06%
1975	373,179	−0.03%
1982	377,356	+0.16%
1990	386,365	+0.30%
1999	388,293	+0.06%
2007	406,793	+0.58%
2012	416,384	+0.47%
2017	413,606	−0.13%
2023	417,614	+0.16%

The population peaked at 505,789 in 1851 according to that year's census. After that, the population declined to 373,000 by 1975. This reflected the long term population decline observed in many of the rural departments resulting from changes in agriculture and the lure of higher industrial wages available in more urbanised regions. After 1975, the population increased again, reaching 417,000 by 2023.

Dordogne has a British immigrant community. In 2022, the Dordogne department had 7,429 British residents. According to INSEE, in 2022, 405 people residing in the Dordogne were born in the United States. Furthermore, the number of American residents in the Dordogne has increased by 22.4% since 2016. Americans and Britons are drawn to the area by the French lifestyle, nature, safety, heritage, gastronomy, and "a more relaxed pace of life", with Périgord being the most sought-after region. The village of Eymet is at the heart of the trend, with 200 British families among 2,600 inhabitants in 2008. In 2022, 20% of Eymet's 2,700 inhabitants were British.

== Politics ==
The President of the Departmental Council is Germinal Peiro of the Socialist Party.

Party		Seats
•	Socialist Party	25
•	French Communist Party	2
	Miscellaneous right	7
	The Republicans	5
•	Sans étiquette	4

=== Current National Assembly Representatives ===
Constituency	Member	Party
Dordogne's 1st constituency	Nadine Lechon	National Rally
Dordogne's 2nd constituency	Serge Muller	National Rally
Dordogne's 3rd constituency	Florence Joubert	National Rally
Dordogne's 4th constituency	Jacqueline Dubois	The Ecologists

== Tourism ==
- Château de Mauriac (Douzillac)
- Maison forte de Reignac
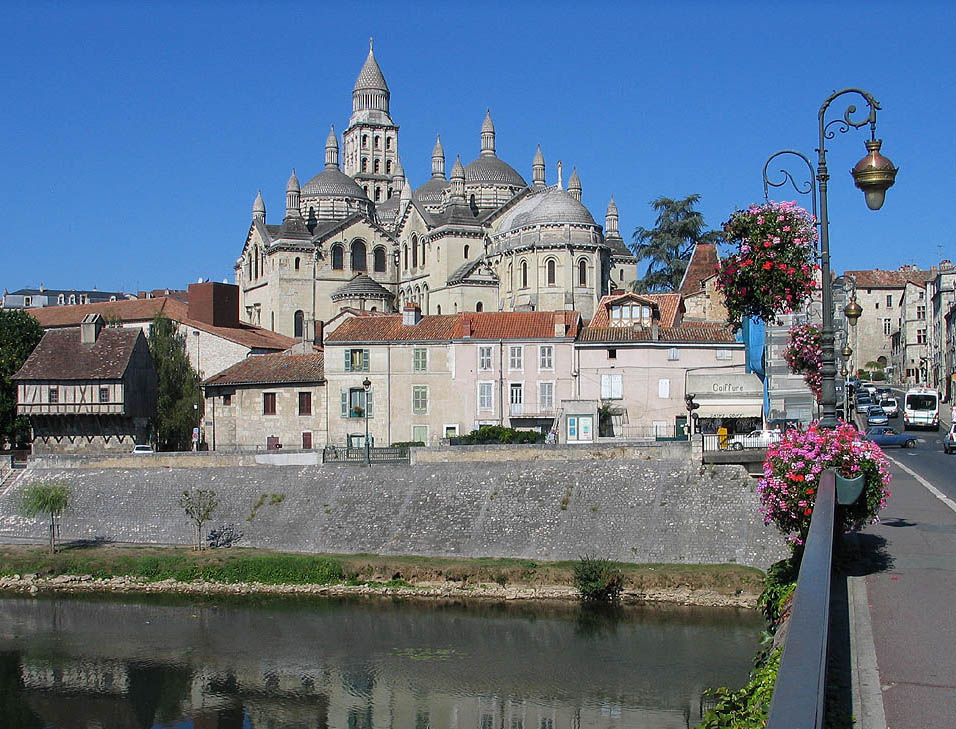
Périgueux

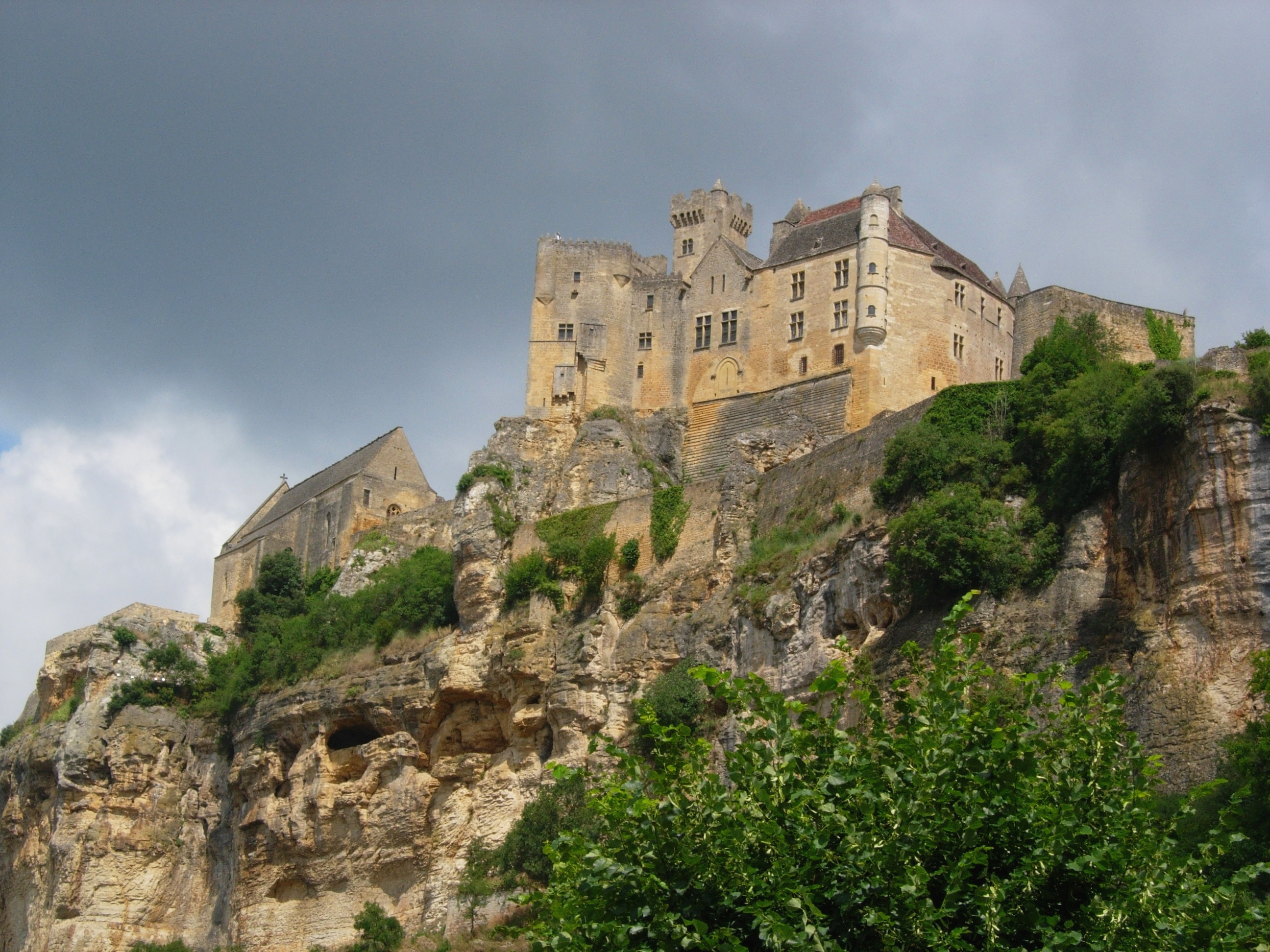
Château de Beynac

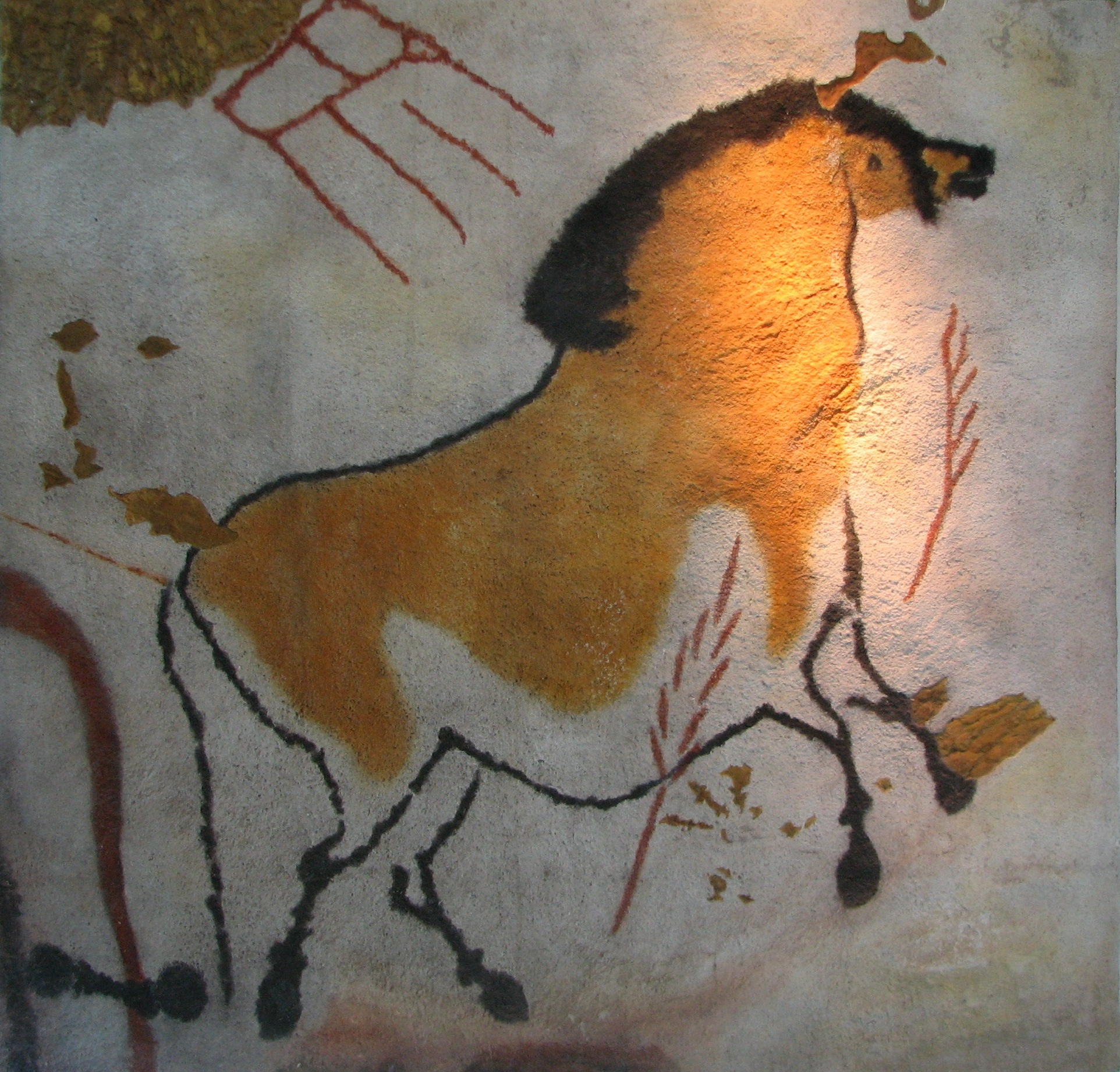
Lascaux

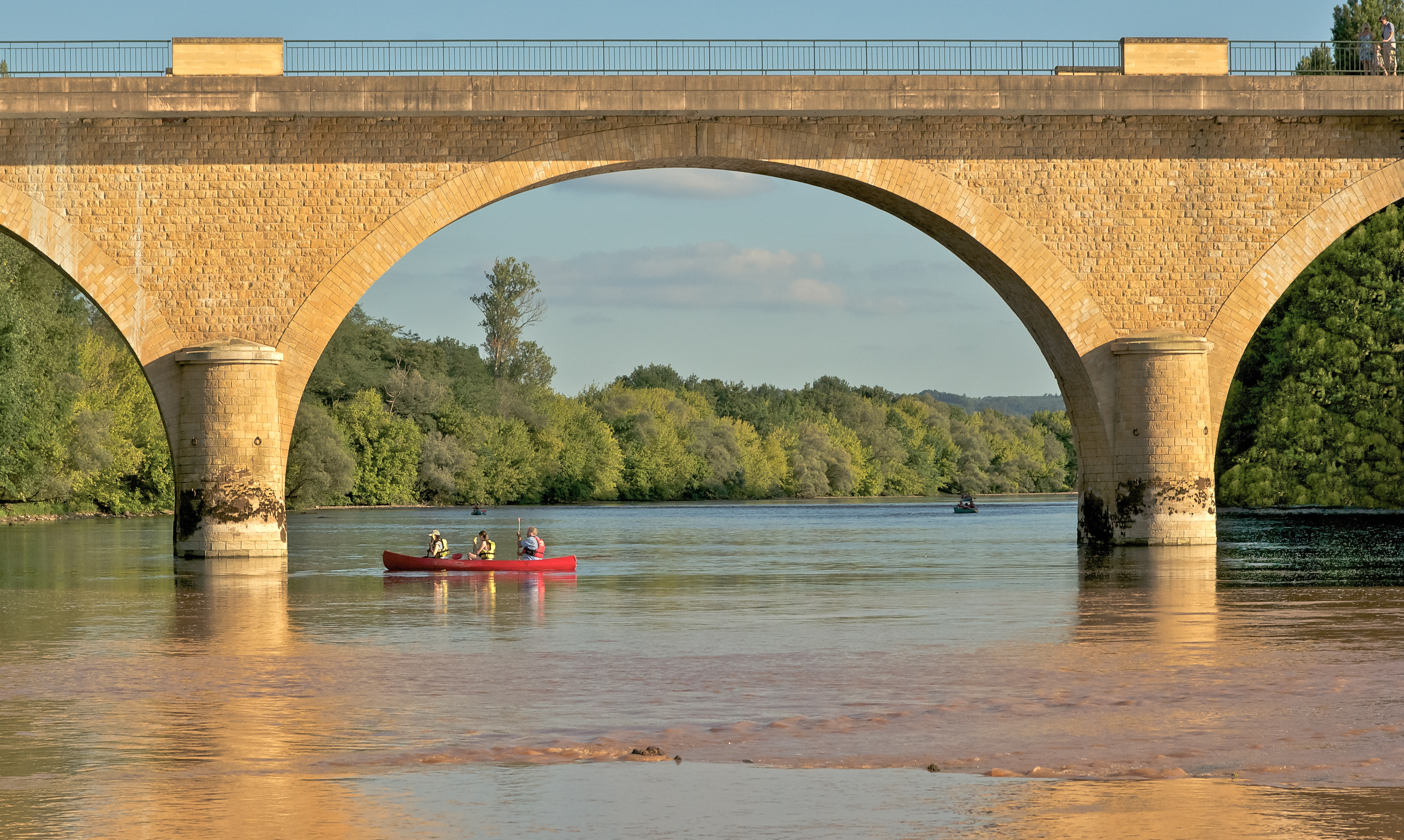
Canoeing on the Dordogne River

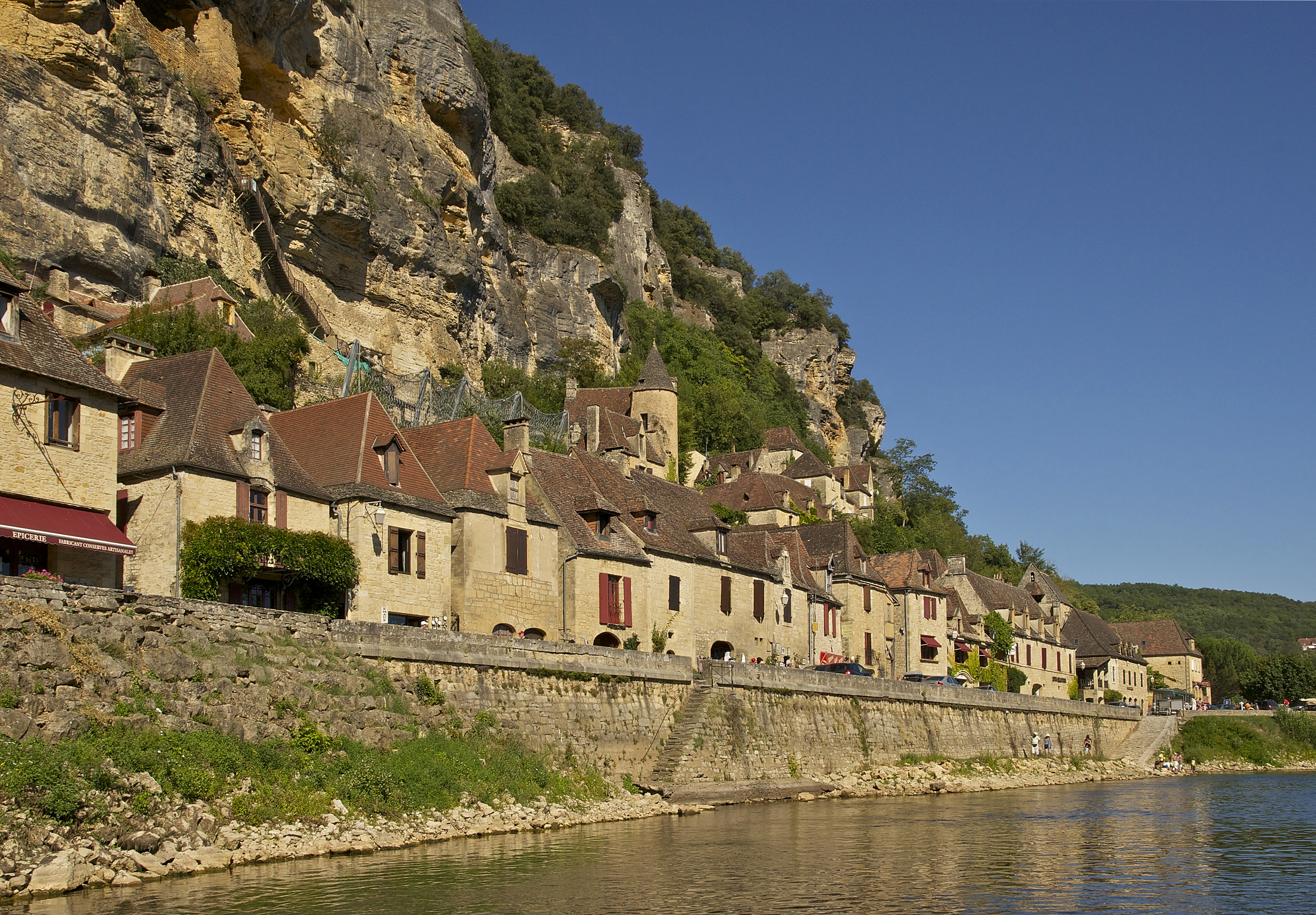
La Roque-Gageac

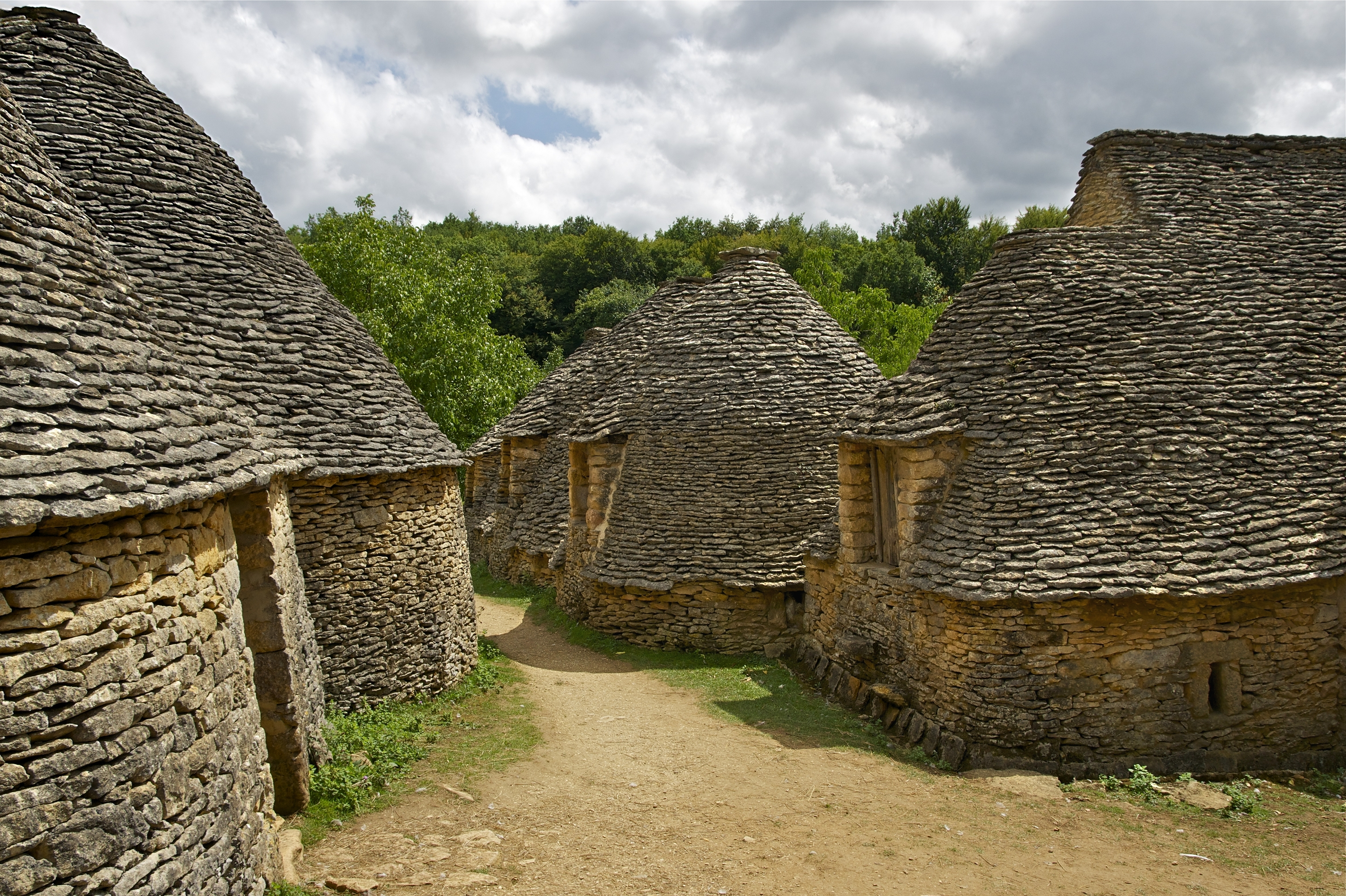
Cabanes du Breuil

There are more than 1,500 castles in Dordogne, making it "The Other Chateau Country", including:

- Beynac
- Biron
- Manoir de la Borie-Fricart
- Bourdeilles
- Castelnaud-la-Chapelle
- Chantérac
- Chatenet
- Commarque
- Hautefort
- Manoir de Jaillac
- Jaurias
- La Besse
- La Mothe
- La Petite Filolie
- La Renaudie
- La Roche
- La Roque
- Manoir de Mitonias
- Milandes
- Monbazillac
- Manoir de Grézignac
- Manoir de la Vermondie
- Manoir des Pautis
- Pécany
- Puymartin
- Saulnier

The famous caves of Lascaux have been closed to the public, but a replica of Lascaux II is open to visitors and is a major tourist attraction. Périgueux has important Roman ruins, including an arena which is still visible inside a public park located near the town centre.

Dordogne is particularly popular with Britons as well as people from a variety of other countries, as a location for second homes.

== See also ==
- Arrondissements of the Dordogne department
- Cantons of the Dordogne department
- Communes of the Dordogne department
- Coderc Plaza
- Le Monument vivant de Biron
