= Chestnut Valley =

Area of St. Louis in Missouri, US

Coordinates: 38.631°N 90.215°W

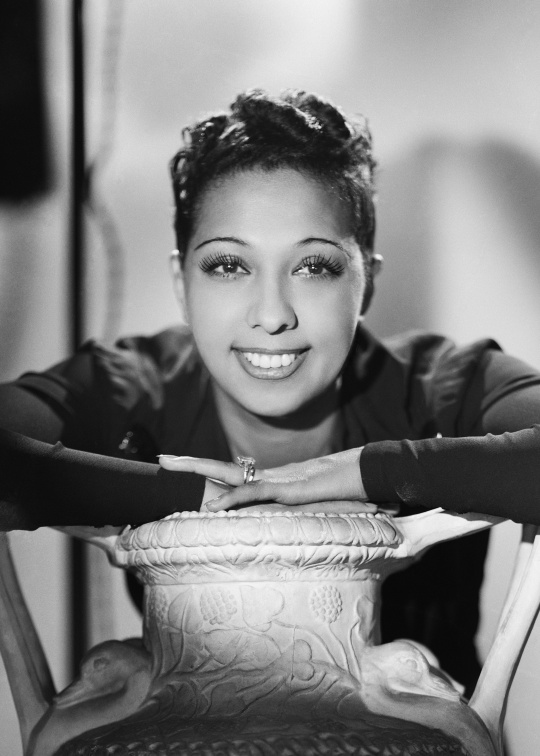
Joséphine Baker, 1940

Chestnut Valley was an African American section of St. Louis centered on Market Street, Targee Street (named for Thomas Targee who was killed fighting the 1849 St. Louis fire), and Chestnut Street. It existed from the late 19th century serving steamship workers plying their trade on the Mississippi on into the 20th century. These were segregated eras. Chestnut Valley was a font of ragtime music development with Tom Turpin's Rosbud Café from 1900 to 1906 succeeding venues and later his brother Charles H. Turpin's Booker T. Washington Theatre. Mill Creek Valley, home to Scott Joplin and Josephine Baker, was adjacent. Union Station was nearby.

The theater closed in 1930 and the area, also known for gambling, bars, and brothels, was demolished in mayor Joseph Darst slum clearance urban renewal program. Missouri Governor Forrest Smith signed the Municipal Land Clearance for Redevelopment Law in 1951, providing state aid for urban renewal programs in Missouri cities. Expressways replaced the Pine Street Hotel, Peoples Finance Building, and other area buildings.

Near a train station the area was home to the Calumet Hotel.

Trebnor Tichenor wrote the "Chestnut Valley Rag" in 1963 in commemoration of the area.
