= Jo Bouillon =

French composer, conductor and violinist (1908–1984)

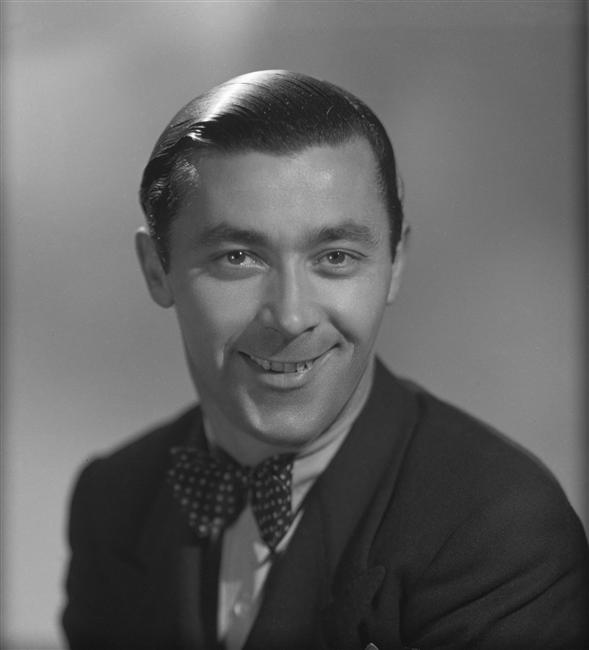
- Bouillon in 1939
- Born: Joseph Bouillon; 3 May 1908; Montpellier, Occitania, France
- Died: 9 July 1984 (aged 76); Buenos Aires, Argentina
- Burial place: Monaco Cemetery
- Occupations: Composer; conductor; violinist
- Spouse: Josephine Baker (m. 1947; div. 1961)
- Relatives: Gabriel Bouillon (brother)

Joseph Bouillon (3 May 1908 – 9 July 1984) was a French composer, conductor and violinist. As Josephine Baker's fourth husband, he enjoyed prominence in the 1950s.

== Biography ==
Bouillon's father and brother Gabriel were musicologists in Montpellier and Paris, respectively. From 1936 to 1947, he directed "Jo Bouillon et son orchestre" (Jo Bouillon and His Orchestra) then devoted himself to accompanying Josephine Baker.

Baker made many recordings with Bouillon, who accompanied her on her tours, as he had accompanied Mistinguett and Maurice Chevalier. Bouillon married Baker in 1947, and together they bought the Château des Milandes in Dordogne. There, they carried out their project to adopt children of different nationalities in order to prove that the cohabitation of different "races" could work admirably. Finally, they adopted twelve children. All the children that the couple adopted bear the name "Bouillon".

Baker and Bouillon separated in 1957 and divorced in 1961. Bouillon retired to Buenos Aires, where he opened a French restaurant, Le Bistro. He died in 1984, at the age of 76, and is buried in the Monaco Cemetery, his coffin resting above Baker's in the black granite vault of Africa offered by Princess Grace.

== Bibliography ==
- Joséphine, with Josephine Baker (and the collaboration of Jacqueline Cartier), Éditions Robert Laffont, 1976
- La véritable Joséphine Baker, ISBN 2857046162 by Emmanuel Bonini, éditions Pygmalion, 2000
