= Gabriel Bouillon =

French musician (1898–1984)

Gabriel Charles Bouillon (5 March 1898 – 1984) was a French classical violinist and music pedagogue.

== Biography ==
Gabriel Charles Bouillon was born March 5, 1898, in Montpellier, France.

Bouillon comes from a family of musicians. His brother Jo Bouillon was Josephine Baker's fourth husband. He studied in his hometown and with Jacques Thibaud in Paris. After that he taught violin at the Conservatoire de Paris. Among his pupils were Henryk Szeryng, Erkki Kantola, Horst Sannemüller, Charles Chaynes, Jean-Pierre Wallez and Suna Kan.

He visited the retired composer Manuel de Falla three weeks before his death in Argentina and reported to the weekly newspaper Le Littéraire after his return to France about the unfinished oratorio Atlántida. The manuscript was later completed by the Spanish composer Ernesto Halffter.

Bouillon established his own string quartet in the 1930s. He died in Montpellier in 1984.

== Bibliography ==
- Ludvig Ernst Bramsen: Musikkens hvem hvad hvor. Biografier, Vol 1, Politikens håndbøger - Politikens musikbibliotek, Politikens forlag, 1961
- Angela Hughes: Pierre Fournier: Cellist in a Landscape with Figures, p. 24, Ashgate, 1998 ISBN 1-85928-422-1
