= Charles H. Turpin =

American constable, filmmaker, and theater owner

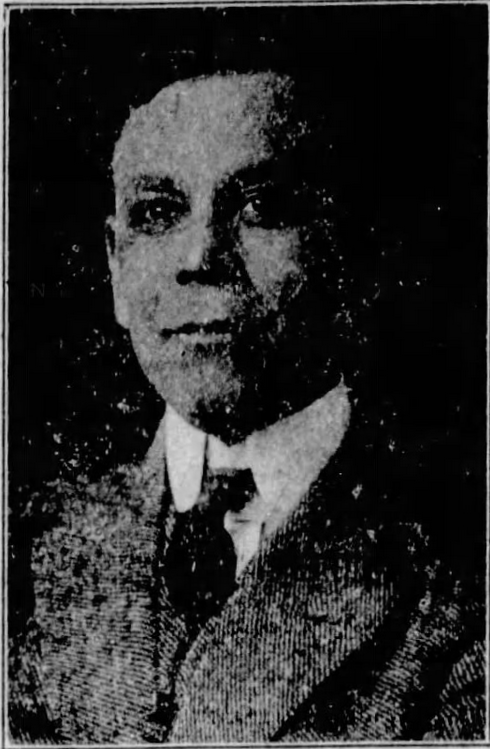
Charles H. Turpin

Charles H. Turpin (died 1935) was a constable filmmaker, theater owner, and judge in St. Louis, Missouri. In 1910, he became the first African American elected to city-wide office in St. Louis. A legal dispute contested his estate.

He was born in Ohio and moved with his family to Mississippi for a few years as a child. Tom Turpin, a musician and ragtime composer, was his brother. Saloon owner and businessman John L. Turpin, proprietor of the Silver Dollar Saloon in St. Louis was their father.

In 1913 he arranged to build a 1-story theater building in St. Louis. He served as a constable in St. Louis Fourth District. The St. Louis Post-Dispatch advised readers not to re-elect him as constable.

In 1937, Time magazine referred to him as a "taffy-colored Republican".

Turpin was also involved in filmmaking. He produced short documentary films.

Thomas Million John Turpin Jr. was his brother.

He owned the Booker T. Washington theater in St. Louis.

Charles Udell Turpin was his son. He was noted as a successful Remington salesman.

He died December 25, 1935 in Miami Beach, Florida aged 60 and was buried at St. Peter’s Cemetery in St. Louis.

== Booker T. Washington Theatre ==
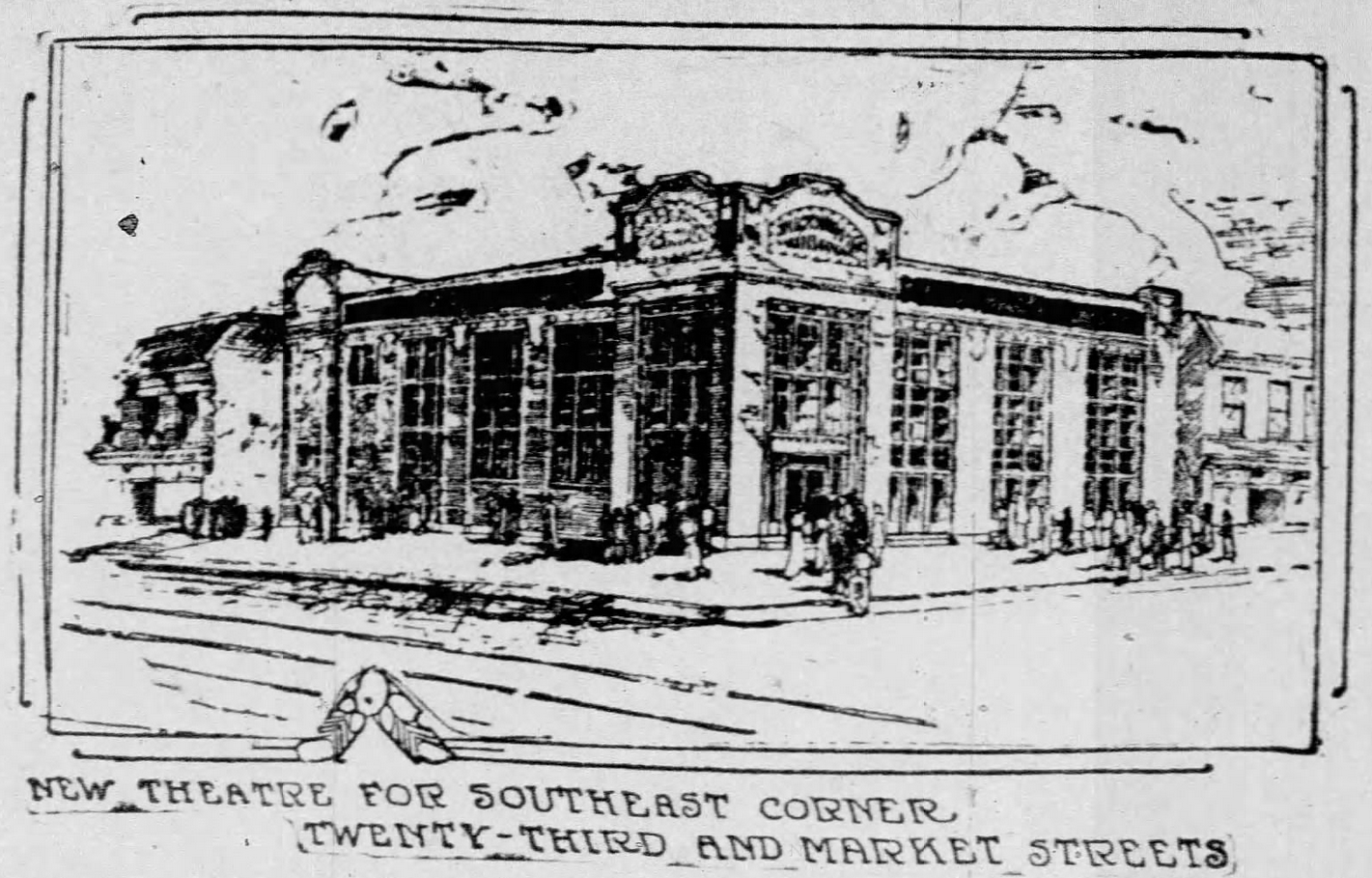
Booker T. Washington Theatre

The Booker T. Washington Theatre was preceded by John L. Turpin's Silver Dollar saloon and then the Rosebud Café from 1800 to 1906 where his brother performed. It became an important venue in St. Louis. The theater building, designed by J. M. Hirschtein, succeeded an Airdome theater Turpin operated on the site for several years.

The theater hosted vaudeville, motion pictures, and musical acts including Clara Smith, Bessie Smith, Ethel Waters and Bill Robinson. A young Josephine Baker performed with her children outside the theater seeking notice. It closed around 1930.
