= Betty: A Glad Awakening =

1987 memoir

- Title page for Betty: A Glad Awakening (1987)
- Author: Betty Ford, Chris Chase
- Language: English
- Genre: Memoir
- Publisher: Doubleday
- Publication date: 1987
- Publication place: United States

Betty: A Glad Awakening is a memoir by Betty Ford with Chris Chase. The book was published by Doubleday in 1987. The second autobiographical work from her, the first being Betty Ford: The Times of My Life in 1987, it chronicles her struggle with addiction to alcohol and several drugs.

== Reception ==
In his article on the book in The New York Times, editor Marian Sandmaier writes that they believe it really is a modest book about one woman's capacity for change, able to confront her drug dependence. The article goes on to say is a gentle dare to alcohol and drug abusers in the United States. Writing for the same paper in retrospect close to twenty years later, Jennifer Steinhauer mentions the work against the backdrop of the death of former US President Gerald R. Ford, stressing that when her family intervened, she was able to open a new chapter in her life founding a clinic in California, continuing to head it until she turned 88 in 2005.
