= Le pompier des Folies Bergères =

1928 French film

- Directed by: unknown
- Starring: Josephine Baker
- Release date: 1928
- Running time: 7 1/2 minutes
- Country: France

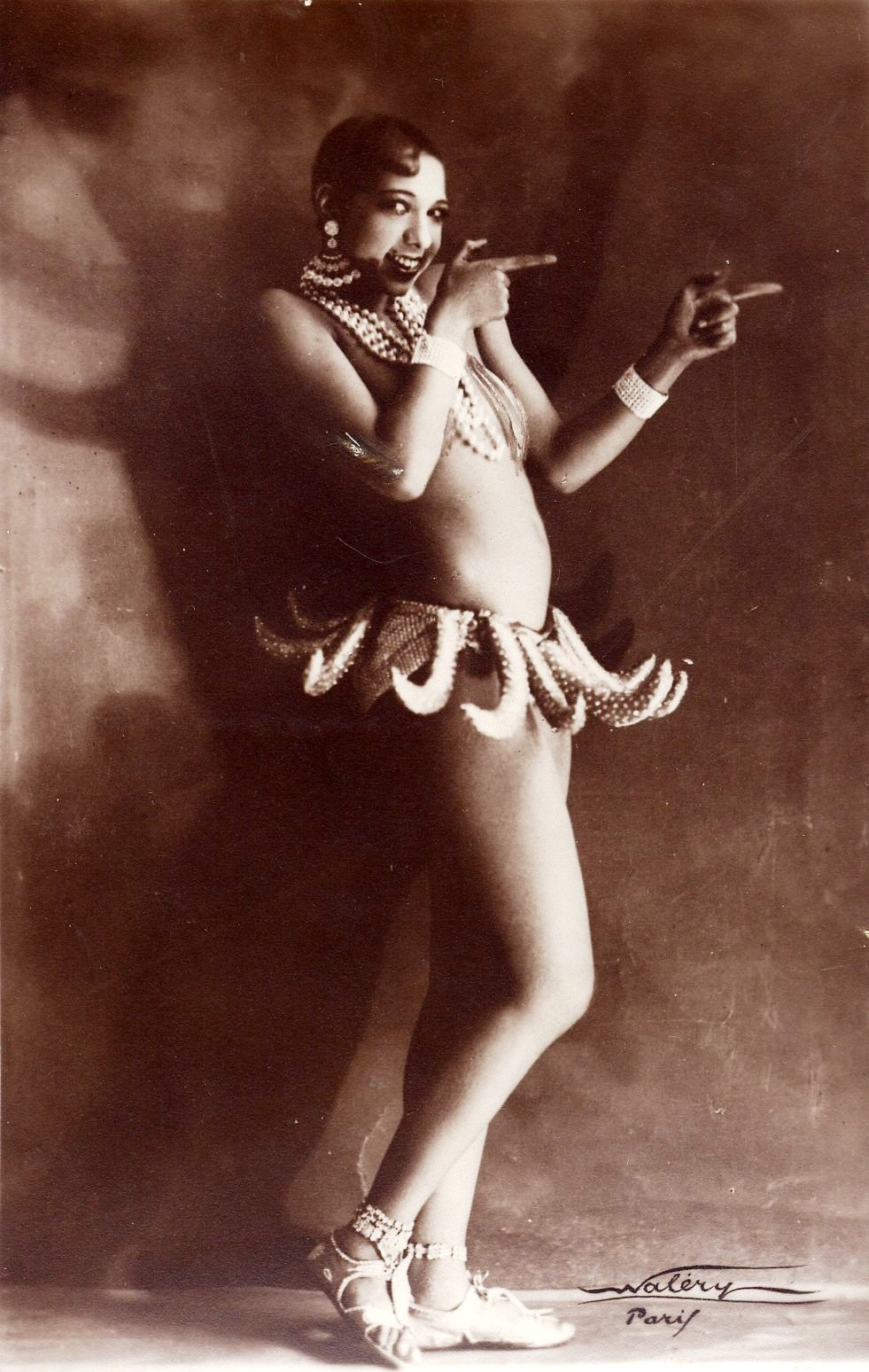
Josephine Baker in her banana skirt, from the Folies Bergère production "Un Vent de Folie", elements of which were repeated in Le pompier des Folies Bergères

Le pompier des Folies Bergères (Note: In some sources, called Le pompier des Folies Bergère) (The fireman of the Folies Bergères), also known as Un pompier qui prend feu (A fireman catches fire) and Les Hallucinations d'un pompier (The hallucinations of a fireman) is a 1928 French silent film featuring Josephine Baker. The director is unknown. The film is about seven-and-a-half minutes long.

The film was produced in 1927 and released in 1928. The storyline involves the erotic fantasies of a fireman, and includes elements from Baker's Folies Bergère performance entitled "Un Vent desfolies at the Folies-Bergere." The fireman, inspired by seeing the Folies Bergère, imagines that people that he encounters are naked women.

Baker appears in two scenes as subway driver who transforms into a "scantily dressed ... unnamed, seductive showgirl" in part of the fireman's fantasies, and dances the Charleston in one scene. Terri Francis, a cinema and media studies academic, notes that there are several contrasts in the film between a number of white women who appear nude, in immobile posed groups, and Baker, who is dressed, dances, and appears individually.

Sociologist Bennetta Jules-Rosette wrote in 2007 that "Although this film would be considered softcore pornography today, it is difficult to determine the extent of its distribution and the responses of its audience when it was released in 1928." The Bibliothèque nationale de France has a video copy of the film.
