= Umberto Bassignani =

Italian sculptor (1878–1944)

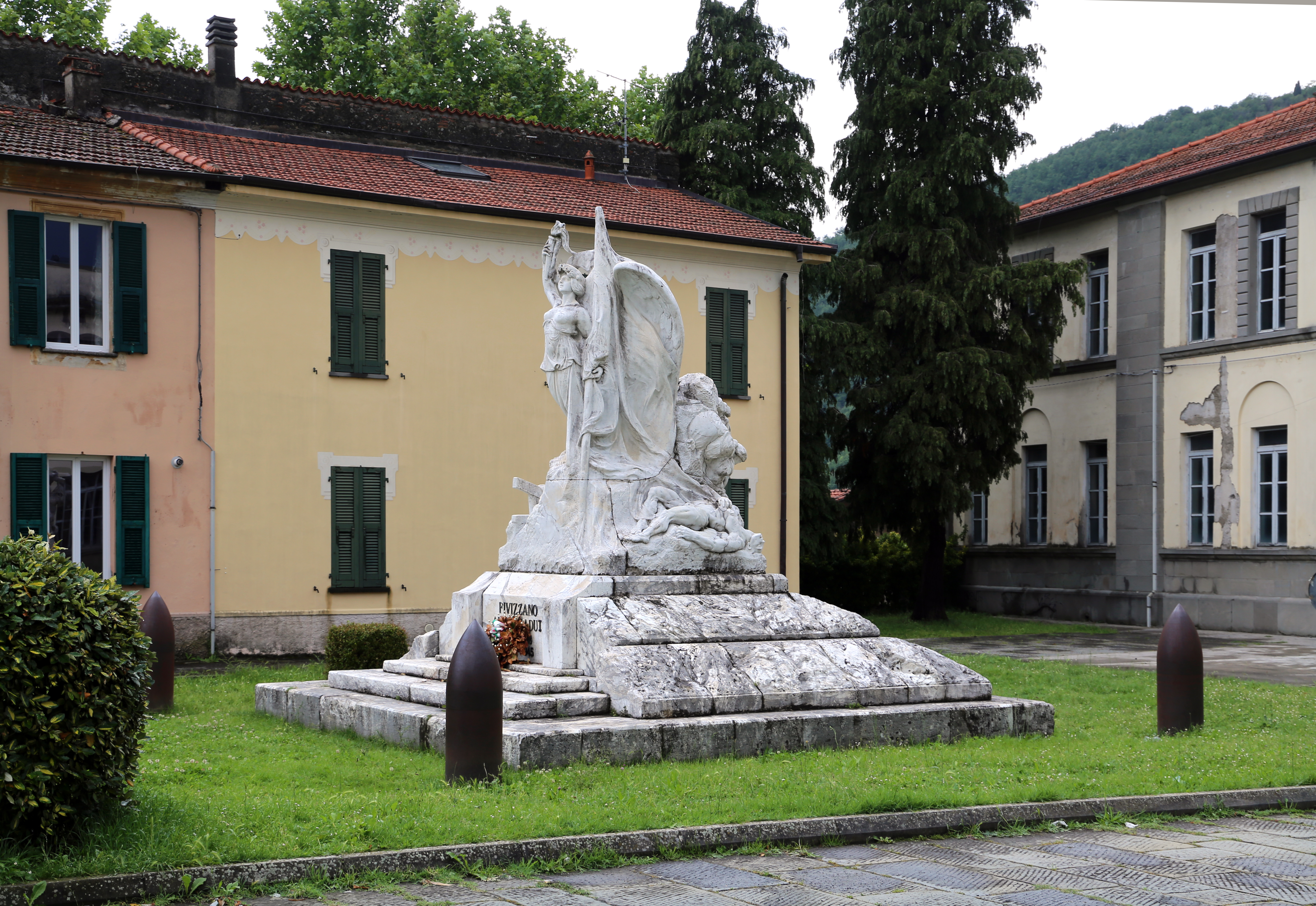
- Sculpture designed by Umberto Bassignani
- Born: 29 August 1878; Fivizzano, Tuscany, Italy
- Died: 21 January 1944 (aged 65); Lerici, Liguria, Italy
- Occupation: Sculptor

Umberto Bassignani (29 August 1878 – 21 January 1944) was an Italian sculptor. He designed public sculptures in Italy, France, Switzerland, Russia and Monaco, where he had an atelier.

== Early life ==
Umberto Bassignani was born on 29 August 1878 in Fivizzano, Tuscany, Italy.

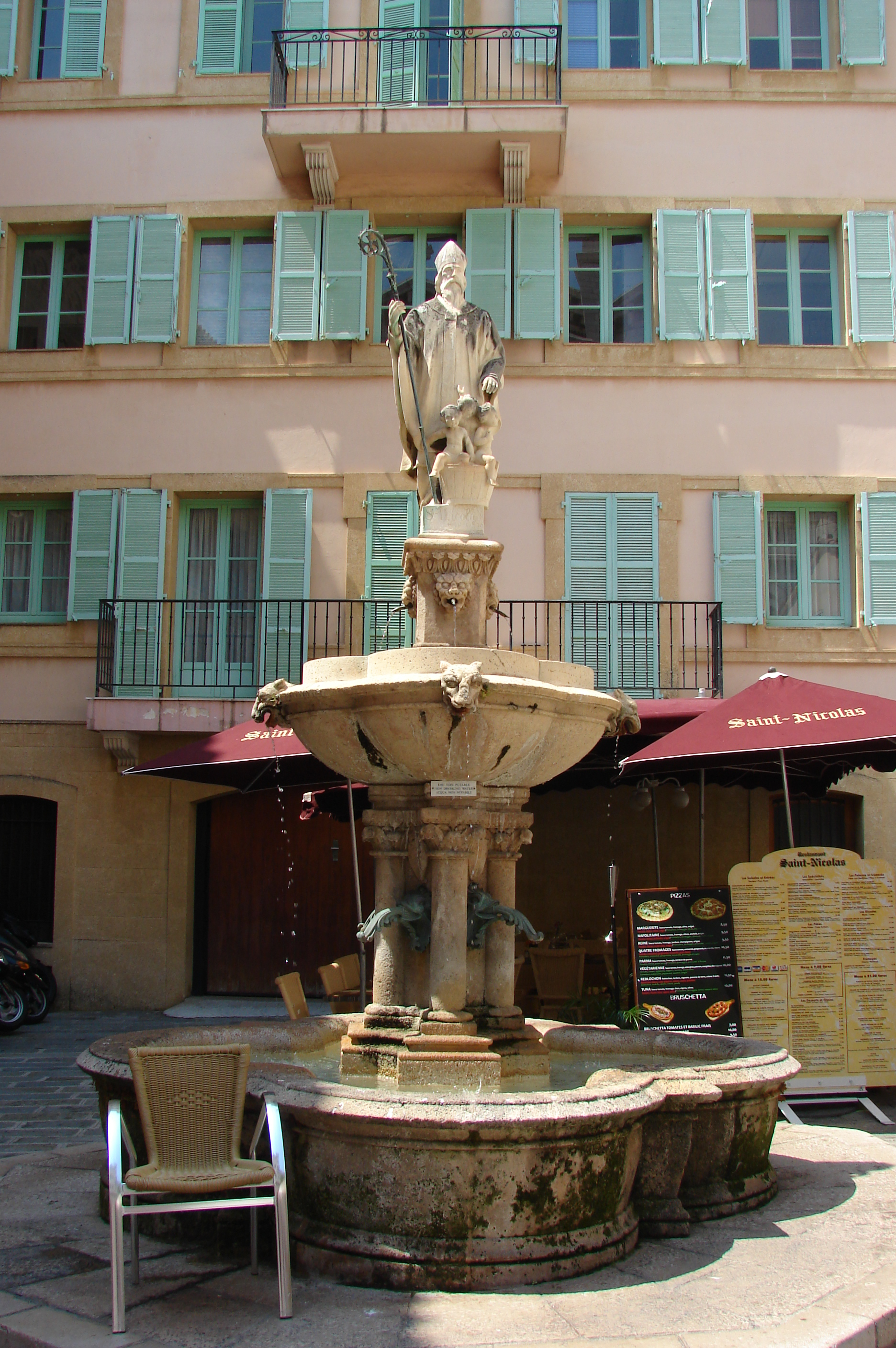
Fountain on the Place Saint Nicolas, designed by Umberto Bassignani in 1930.

== Career ==
Bassignani opened an atelier at 13 boulevard Charles III in Monaco in 1907. He designed many sculptures in the Monaco Cemetery. He exhibited his work at the Exposition Universelle et Internationale in Brussels in 1910, where he represented Monaco and he won a silver medal for a bust.

Bassignani designed public sculptures in Italy, France, Switzerland, Russia and Monaco. For example, he designed the World War I monuments in his hometown of Fivizzano as well as in Vazzola. In France, he designed sculptures in Paris, Nice, Aurillac and Peille. His public sculptures can also be seen in Rostov, Russia, and in Geneva, Switzerland. He also designed the fountain on the Place Saint Nicolas in Monaco-Ville in 1930.

Bassignani left Monaco in 1939.

== Death and legacy ==
Bassignani died on 21 January 1944 in Lerici, Liguria, Italy. On 2 May 2017, the mayor of Monaco, Georges Marsan, dedicated a commemorative plaque at the bottom of the fountain on the Place Saint Nicolas, with his name and dates.
