= Monaco Cemetery =

Cemetery in Monaco

- Cimetière de Monaco
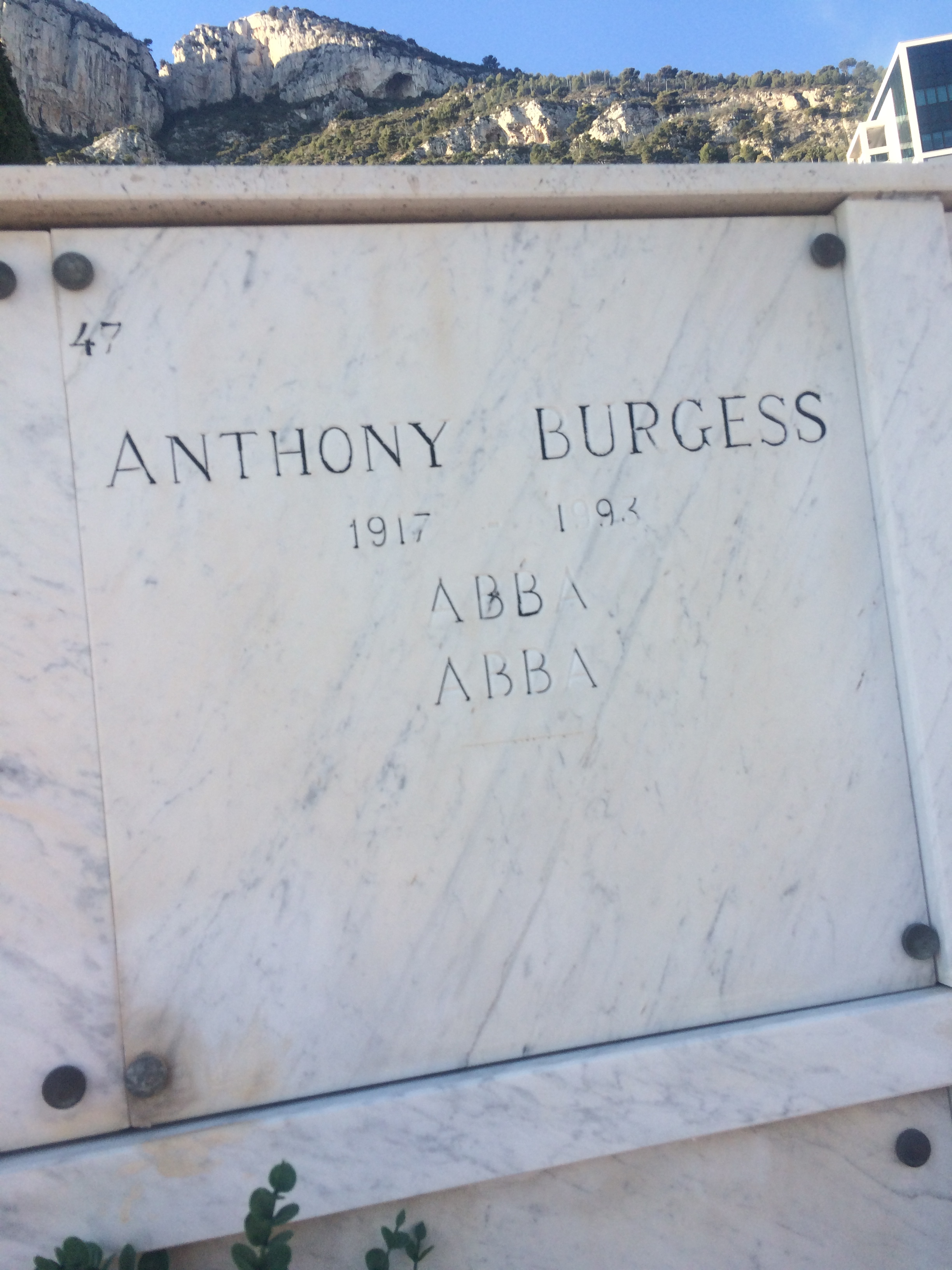
- Interactive map of Monaco Cemetery

Details
- Location: La Colle
- Country: Monaco
- Coordinates: 43.72926°N 7.41163°E
- Type: Public, non-denominational
- Website: www.mairie.mc/poles/pratique/cimetiere/le-cimetiere
- Find a Grave: Monaco Cemetery

The Monaco Cemetery (French: Cimetière de Monaco) is a cemetery in La Colle, Principality of Monaco.

== History ==
In 2015, computer screens were installed throughout the cemetery to help visitors locate specific tombs.

On 27 August 2015 Albert II, Prince of Monaco dedicated a memorial stele in honour of foreign Jews who were taken from Monegasque hotels by the Nazis during the night of 27–28 August 1942.

In 2024, 200 tombs were moved from the lower part of the cemetery to make room for the construction of the new Charles III strip. In 2025, the cemetery started to build a new square containing 200 new spaces, to enhance the capacity of the crematorium, and to build an underground parking area with connecting elevators.

== Description ==
The cemetery contained 2350 tombs until 2014, when 198 more were built. Its columbarium holds 546 boxes. The dispersion of ashes is done in the lower Jardin du Souvenir (Garden of the Memory), in a container that is emptied in the cemetery's underground ossuary when full. It is open to the public from 8am to 7pm in the summer and from 8am to 6pm in the winter.

On-site connected devices enable visitors to easily find a grave by its occupant's name. The concession for a grave lasts 30 years. The cemetery computer system is programmed to ping the municipality when a concession is about to expire.

Many sculptures in the cemetery were designed by Umberto Bassignani.

== Notable burials ==
- Jean-Baptiste Arban, French cornetist, conductor, composer and pedagogue.
- Josephine Baker, American-French entertainer, civil rights activist, and war heroine and her fourth husband, composer Jo Bouillon. While her remains continue to be interred in Monaco, Baker is honoured with a cenotaph in the Panthéon in Paris, into which she was inducted as the first Black woman, in November 2021.
- Marie Bell and her husband Jean Chevrier, actors
- Jules Bianchi, Formula One driver
- Anthony Burgess, writer
- Silas Burroughs, pharmacist
- Cécile Chaminade, composer
- Lady Anne Blanche Alice Coventry (1874–1956) – Third daughter of George William Coventry, 9th Earl of Coventry, and wife of Prince Victor Duleep Singh, known after marriage as Princess Victor Duleep Singh.
- Prince Victor Duleep Singh (1866–1918) – Eldest son of Maharaja Duleep Singh and godson of Queen Victoria.
- Princess Irene Duleep Singh Villemant (1889–1926) – Youngest daughter of Maharaja Duleep Singh and the last-born member of the royal line descending from Maharaja Ranjit Singh, founder of the Sikh Empire and former owner of the Koh-i-Noor diamond.
- Léo Ferré, poet and composer
- Jean-Michel Folon, artist
- Lewis Gilbert, screenwriter and director
- Sir Roger Moore, British actor
- Princess Ashraf Pahlavi, twin sister of Mohammad Reza Pahlavi, the last Shah of Iran, and a member of the Pahlavi dynasty
- Henryk Szeryng, violinist

There are two Commonwealth War Graves Commission graves at the cemetery. They are the graves of two British soldiers of the First World War; Private A. C. V. Dyer of the Royal Army Medical Corps, who died in May 1917 aged 22, and Captain Leo Lucas Ralli (of the Ralli baronets) of the Army Service Corps who died in April 1917 aged 33.
