= Jean-Claude Baker =

French-American restaurateur (1943–2015)

Jean-Claude Julien Léon Tronville, more commonly known as Jean-Claude Baker (April 18, 1943 – January 15, 2015), was a French-American restaurateur.

== Early life and education ==
Jean-Claude Baker was born Jean-Claude Julien Leon Tronville in 1943 in Dijon to Lucien Rouzaud and Constance Luce Tronville, who were not married when he was born, though they married later. At age 14, he struck out on his own, first to Paris where, as a bellhop in the Hôtel Scribe, he met Josephine Baker, an entertainer, activist, and wartime French Resistance agent.

Baker became the legal guardian of Jean-Claude, and he was then an unofficial addition to the 12 adopted children of her orphan "rainbow tribe". He, in turn, took her surname.

== Career ==
In 1968, Jean-Claude Baker founded a popular nightclub, Pimm's Cafe, in West Berlin called "the Berlin equivalent of New York’s Studio 54." He arrived in New York in 1973 and created Telefrance USA in 1976 owing to the lack of French-language programming on cable, in contrast to other languages that already had their programming. He left the channel in 1981 by mutual agreement; the channel ultimately shut down in 1983 due to the financial restructuring of one of its partners.

In 1986 Baker opened the cafe "Chez Josephine" in New York City.

In 1993, he co-authored, with Chris Chase, a biography of Josephine Baker, Josephine: The Hungry Heart, described as a "shocking look into the star's seriously whitewashed past". The Times obituary claimed he "chronicled her every mood and move, constantly seeking to separate the fact from the fiction of her life".

== Personal life and death ==
Baker died by suicide at his home in East Hampton, New York, on January 15, 2015, at age 71.

== Books ==
- Baker, Jean-Claude & Chris Chase. Josephine: The Hungry Heart (2001), Cooper Square Pub; ISBN 0815411723
