= Chris Chase =

American actor and author (1924–2013)

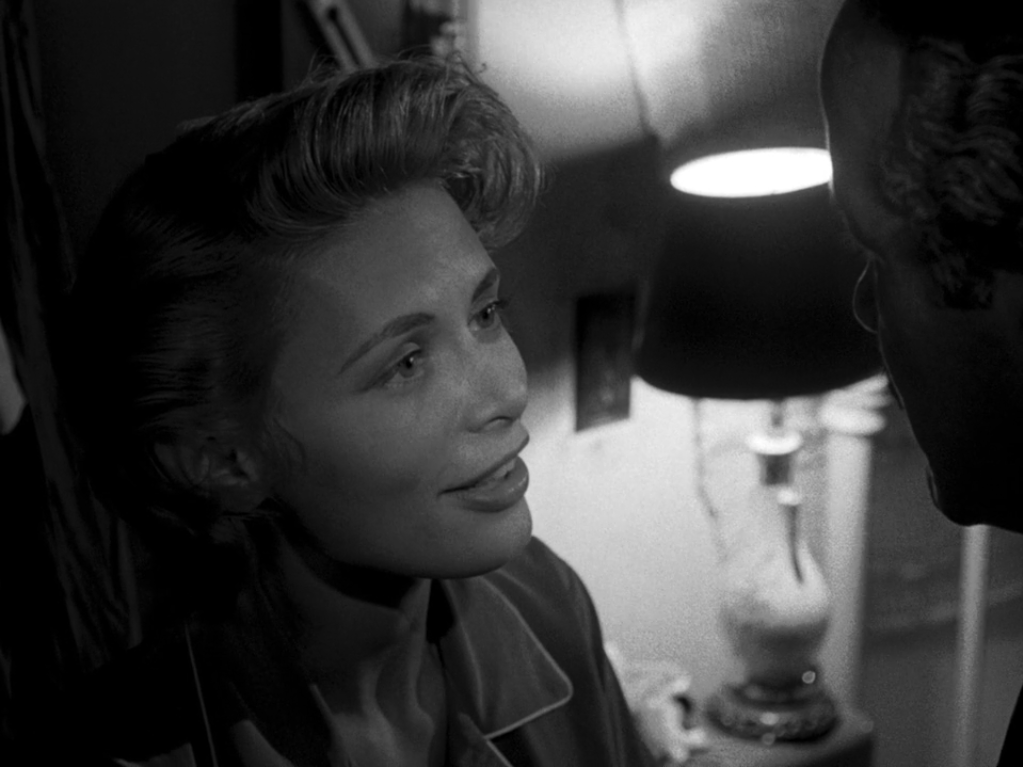
- Chase in Killer's Kiss (1955)
- Born: Irene Greengard; January 12, 1924; New York City, U.S.
- Died: October 31, 2013 (aged 89); New York City, U.S.
- Other name: Irene Kane
- Occupations: Actress, model, writer, journalist
- Spouse: Michael Chase (m. 1961)

Chris Chase (born Irene Greengard; January 12, 1924 – October 31, 2013), also known by the stage name Irene Kane, was an American model, film actress, writer, and journalist. Her best-known role was in Stanley Kubrick's 1955 film Killer's Kiss. She later wrote advice books and co-authored several celebrity autobiographies. She was the sister of Nobel Prize-winning neuroscientist Paul Greengard.

== Early life and career ==
Born to Pearl (née Meister) and Benjamin Greengard in New York City in 1924, Irene Greengard was a model for Vogue. In the mid-1950s, photographer Bert Stern, who had photographed her for that magazine, introduced her to film director Kubrick when he was looking for the female lead for Killer's Kiss. She took the professional name Irene Kane, and went on to appear in other films as well as Broadway theatre productions.

As Chris Chase, she moved into journalism, working at The New York Times, and writing advice books on weight loss and getting into film acting.

After a short stint at CBS Morning News, Chase joined CNN in 1980 and stayed until 1986, serving as the first anchor of Media Watch in 1985. She co-authored several celebrity autobiographies, including books by Rosalind Russell, Betty Ford, and Alan King, and co-authored a biography of Josephine Baker with Baker's adopted son Jean-Claude.

== Marriage ==
On June 3, 1961, Kane married Michael Chase (born 1932), an educational television producer, and the son of playwright Mary Chase. She took her husband's surname professionally as well as legally. Chase and her husband were seriously injured in a car accident near Poughkeepsie, New York, in March 1975.

== Death ==
Chase died of pancreatic cancer on October 31, 2013, at her home in New York City, aged 89.

== Acting ==
=== Films and television ===
- Killer's Kiss (1955)
- Naked City (1958, 1963)
- Love of Life (1962–65)
- All That Jazz (1979; as Chris Chase)
- Stanley Kubrick: A Life in Pictures (2001; as Chris Chase)

=== Stage ===
- Threepenny Opera (1955)
- The Ponder Heart (1956)
- Tenderloin (1960)

== Books ==
- How to Be a Movie Star, or A Terrible Beauty Is Born (1974), ISBN 9780060107260, ISBN 978-0425041949
- Life Is a Banquet (1977) with Rosalind Russell, ISBN 978-0394421346
- Times of My Life (1978) with Betty Ford, ISBN 978-0-06-011298-1
- The Great American Waistline (1981), ISBN 978-0698110694
- Betty: A Glad Awakening (1987) with Betty Ford, ISBN 978-0-385-23502-0
- Josephine: The Josephine Baker Story (1993) with Jean-Claude Baker, ISBN 978-1558504721
- Name Dropping (1996) with Alan King, ISBN 978-1439143438
