= Château des Milandes =

Castle in Dordogne, France

Coordinates: 44°49′25″N 1°06′48″E

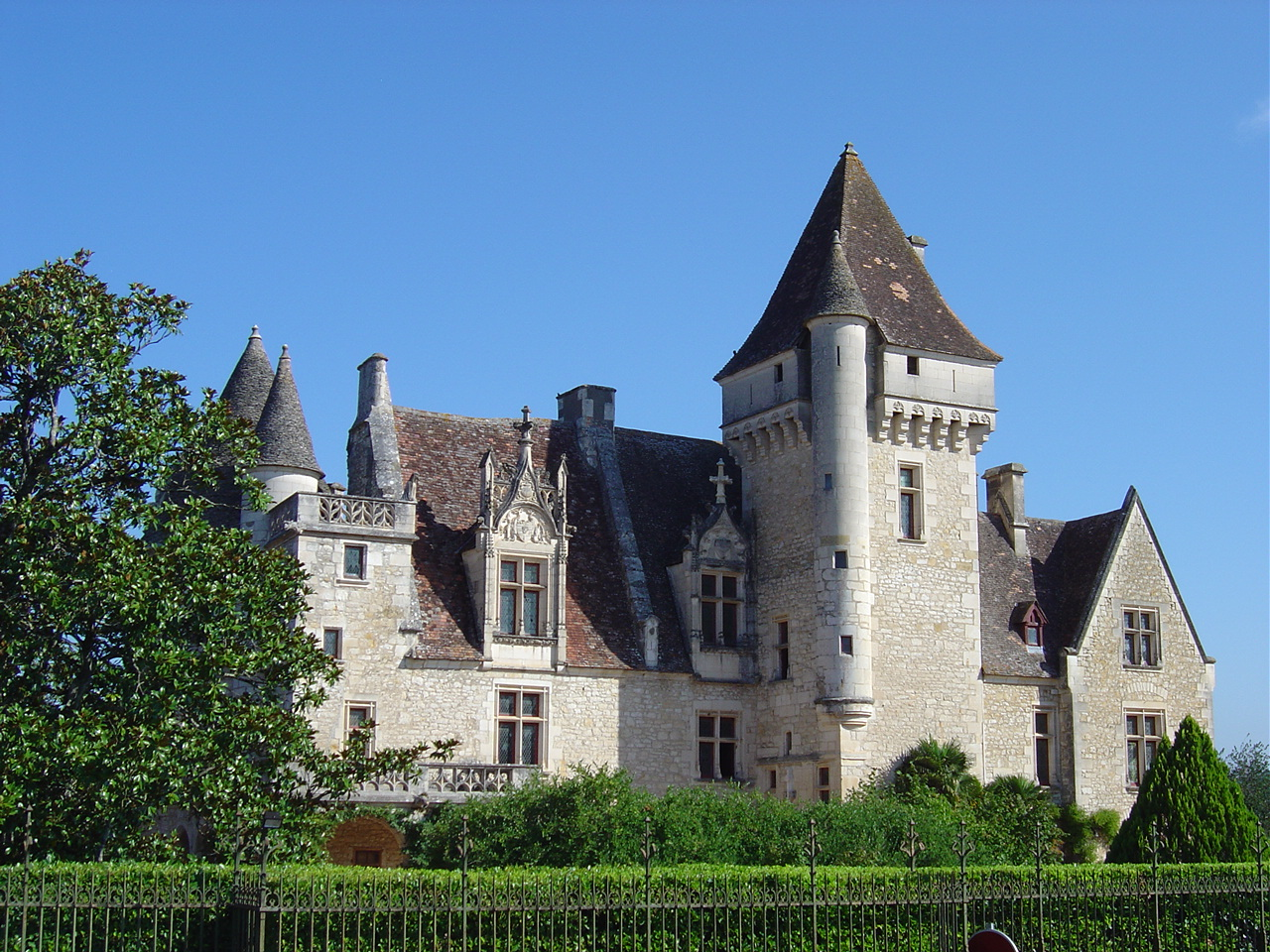
Château des Milandes

The Château des Milandes is a manor house in the commune of Castelnaud-la-Chapelle in the Dordogne département of France. Built by François de Caumont around 1489, it was, until 1535, the main house of the lords of Caumont, who preferred to live in this manor house instead of the large, uncomfortable medieval castle of Château de Castelnaud-la-Chapelle.

In 1940, the entertainer Josephine Baker rented the château, and moved there after the German invasion of Paris in 1941, using it as a centre for resistance activity. In 1947 she bought the château.

It has been listed as a monument historique by the French Ministry of Culture since 1986.

== See also ==
- List of castles in France
