= Josephine Baker =

American-born French entertainer (1906–1975)

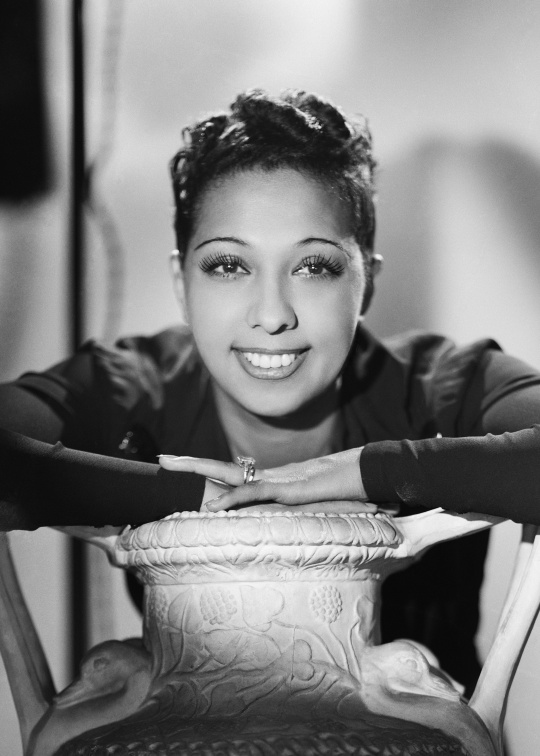
- Baker in 1940
- Born: Freda Josephine McDonald; June 3, 1906; St. Louis, Missouri, U.S.
- Died: April 12, 1975 (aged 68); Paris, France
- Resting place: Monaco Cemetery
- Citizenship: United States (until 1937); France (from 1937)
- Occupations: Vedette; singer; dancer; actress; civil rights activist; French Resistance agent
- Years active: 1921–1975
- Spouses: Willie Wells (m. 1919; div. 1919) William Baker (m. 1921; div. 1925) Jean Lion (m. 1937; div. 1940) Jo Bouillon (m. 1947; div. 1961)
- Partner: Robert Brady (1973–1975)
- Children: 12 (Note: Jean-Claude Baker presented himself as her foster son, however his claim had been contested by Baker’s children.)
- Musical career
- Genres: Cabaret; music hall; French pop; French jazz
- Instrument: Vocals
- Labels: Columbia; Mercury; RCA Victor

Freda Josephine Baker (née McDonald; June 3, 1906 – April 12, 1975), spelled Joséphine Baker in French, was an American-born French dancer, singer, and actress, and a spy for the French Resistance. Her career was centered primarily in Europe, mostly in France. She was the first Black woman to star in a major motion picture, the 1927 French silent film Siren of the Tropics, directed by Mario Nalpas and Henri Étiévant.

During her early career, Baker was among the most celebrated performers to headline the revues of the Folies Bergère in Paris. Her performance in its 1927 revue Un vent de folie caused a sensation in the city. Her costume, consisting only of a short skirt of artificial bananas and a beaded necklace, became an iconic image and a symbol both of the Jazz Age and the Roaring Twenties. Baker was celebrated by artists and intellectuals of the era, who variously dubbed her the "Black Venus", the "Black Pearl", the "Bronze Venus", and the "Creole Goddess". Born in St. Louis, Missouri, she became a French national after her marriage to the French industrialist Jean Lion in 1937. She adopted 12 children, whom she referred to as the Rainbow Tribe, and raised them in France.

Baker aided the French Resistance during World War II and also worked with the British Secret Intelligence Service and the United States Office of Strategic Services, to an extent which was not publicized until 2020, when French documents were declassified. After the war, she was awarded the Resistance Medal by the French Committee of National Liberation and the Croix de Guerre by the French military, and was named a Knight of the Legion of Honour by General Charles de Gaulle. Baker sang "J'ai deux amours" (English: "I Have Two Loves").

She refused to perform for segregated audiences in the United States and is also noted for her contributions to the civil rights movement. In 1968, she was offered unofficial leadership in the movement following the assassination of Martin Luther King Jr., but declined due to concerns for the welfare of her children. On November 30, 2021, Baker was inducted into the Panthéon in Paris, the first black woman to receive one of the highest honors in France. As her resting place remains in Monaco Cemetery, a cenotaph was installed in vault 13 of the crypt in the Panthéon.

== Early life ==
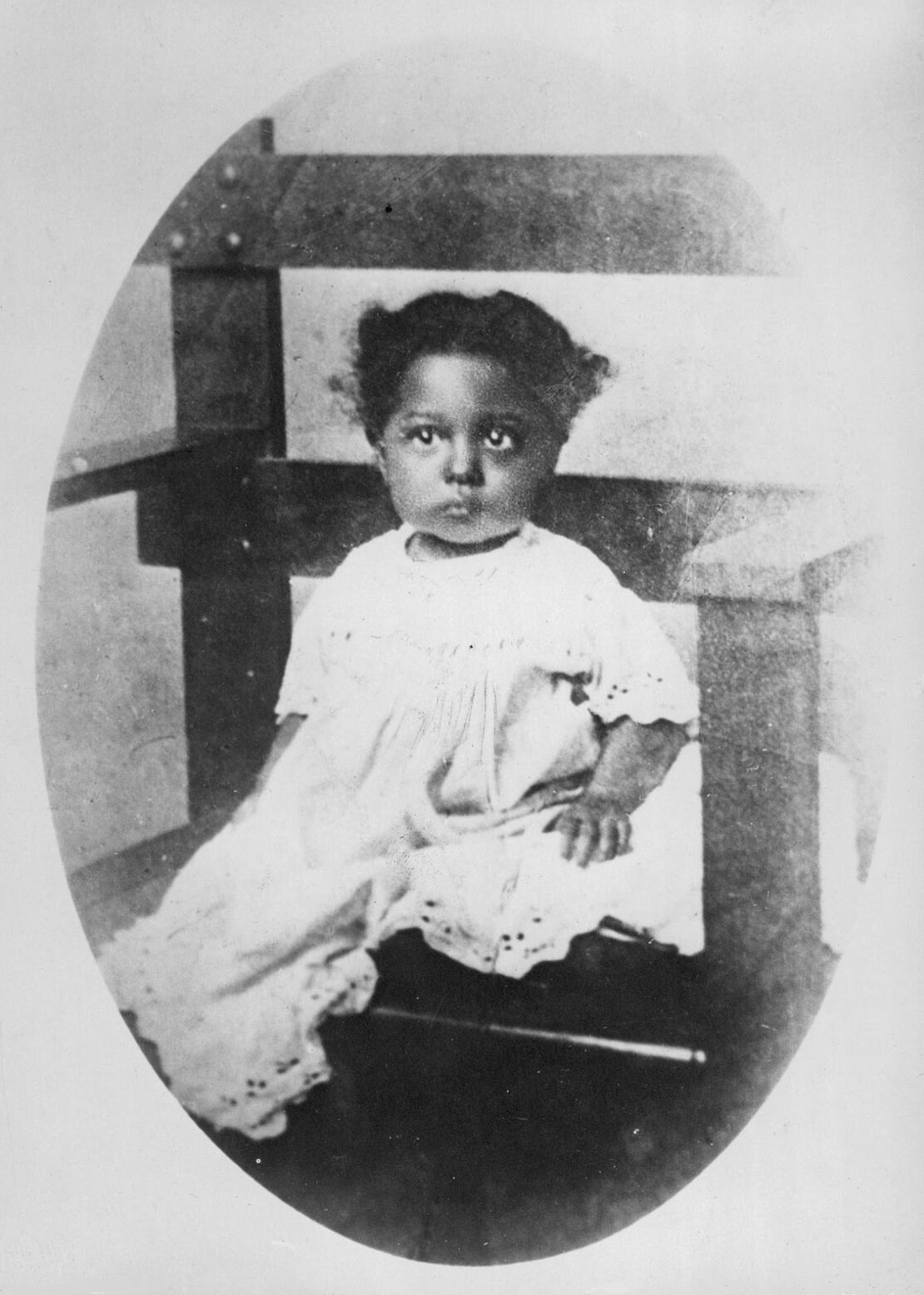
Unconfirmed photo of Baker, c. 1908

Josephine Baker was born Freda Josephine McDonald in St. Louis, Missouri. Her mother, Carrie, was adopted in Little Rock, Arkansas, in 1886, by Richard and Elvira McDonald, the latter of whom was a former slave, and both of African descent. Carrie McDonald was of African-American and Native-American heritage. Baker's official website identifies the vaudeville drummer Eddie Carson as her biological father; both Carson and Carrie McDonald were vaudeville performers. However, in his 1993 biography entitled Josephine: The Hungry Heart, Baker's foster son, Jean-Claude Baker, stated otherwise. Following decades of exhaustive research into Baker's life and career, Jean-Claude Baker's book described the circumstances of Baker's birth as follows:

The records of the city of St. Louis tell an almost unbelievable story. They show that (Baker's mother) Carrie McDonald ... was admitted to the (exclusively white) Female Hospital on May 3, 1906, diagnosed as pregnant. She was discharged on June 17, her baby, Freda J. McDonald having been born two weeks earlier. Why six weeks in the hospital? Especially for a black woman (of that time) who would customarily have had her baby at home with the help of a midwife? ... The father was identified (on the birth certificate) simply as "Edw".

Jean-Claude Baker failed to unearth the identity of Baker's biological father (which he described as "the most painful mystery of her life"), but that he, Baker, and others believed her father to have been a white man. He added that Eddie Carson "played along" with the assertion that he was Baker's father. Khalid Elhassan, the author of "40 Fascinating Facts About the Fabulous Josephine Baker", noted that it was "almost unheard of" for a person of color to be treated in a white hospital during segregation; he opined that "the likeliest explanation is that Josephine's mother, who worked for a wealthy German family, had been impregnated by her employer, who then pulled strings to get [her] admitted into the city's best hospital".

Josephine McDonald spent her early life on 212 Targee Street (known by some St. Louis residents as Johnson Street) in the Chestnut Valley neighborhood of St. Louis, a racially-mixed low-income area near Union Station, consisting mainly of rooming houses, brothels, and apartments without indoor plumbing. She was poorly dressed and hungry, and she developed street smarts playing in the railroad yards of Union Station.

Her mother married Arthur Martin, "a kind but perpetually unemployed man", with whom she had a son and two more daughters. She worked in a laundry; her mother placed her there due to her family being impoverished; she worked there in order to increase the income of her family and, at eight years old, Josephine began working as a live-in domestic for white families in St. Louis. One woman abused her, burning Josephine's hands when the young girl put too much soap in the laundry.

In 1917, when she was 11, a terrified Josephine McDonald witnessed racial violence in East St. Louis. In a speech years later, she recalled what she had seen:

I can still see myself standing on the west bank of the Mississippi looking over into East St. Louis and watching the glow of the burning of Negro homes lighting the sky. We children stood huddled together in bewilderment ... frightened to death with the screams of the Negro families running across this bridge with nothing but what they had on their backs as their worldly belongings... So with this vision I ran and ran and ran...

By age 12, she had dropped out of school. At 13, she worked as a waitress at the Old Chauffeur's Club at 3133 Pine Street. She also lived as a street child in the slums of St. Louis, sleeping in cardboard shelters, scavenging for food in garbage cans, making a living with street-corner dancing. It was at the Old Chauffeur's Club that Josephine met Willie Wells, whom she married at age 13, but the marriage lasted less than a year. Following her divorce from Wells, (Note: According to Jean-Claude Baker's biography of her, Josephine's marriage to Willie Wells was not legal, they soon parted, and a divorce was not needed. Her marriage to Billy Baker (1998-1950) was her only legal marriage, she began divorce proceedings in 1925 but a decree was never granted, the case was dismissed in 1928 for no progress, and hence the marriage was never legally terminated. She "married" Jean Lion in 1937, and they separated soon afterwards and were divorced in 1941, but she was still legally married to Billy Baker at the time, and so her "marriage" to Lion did not automaticaally confer on her the French nationality that she proudly claimed thereafter; however, she was granted a French passport four days after the marriage. Her "marriage" to Jo Bouillon in 1947, while Billy Baker was still alive, was similarly not legal.) she found work with a street performance group called the Jones Family Band.

In her teens, she struggled to have a healthy relationship with her mother, who opposed her becoming an entertainer and scolded her for not tending to her second husband, William Howard (Billy) Baker, whom she had married in 1921, at age 15. She soon left him when her vaudeville troupe was booked into a New York City venue. They divorced in 1925, during a period when her career success was beginning. Still, she continued to use his last name professionally for the rest of her life. Though Baker was often on the road, returning with gifts and money for her mother and younger half-sister, larger career opportunities drew her farther afield, to France.

== Career ==
=== Early career ===
Baker's unrelenting badgering of a local show manager led to her recruitment for the St. Louis Chorus vaudeville act. At the age of 13, she headed to New York City during the Harlem Renaissance and performed at the Plantation Club, Florence Mills's old stomping ground. After several auditions, she secured a role in the chorus line of a touring production of the groundbreaking and hugely successful Broadway revue Shuffle Along (1921) that helped bring public attention to Florence Mills, Paul Robeson, and Adelaide Hall.

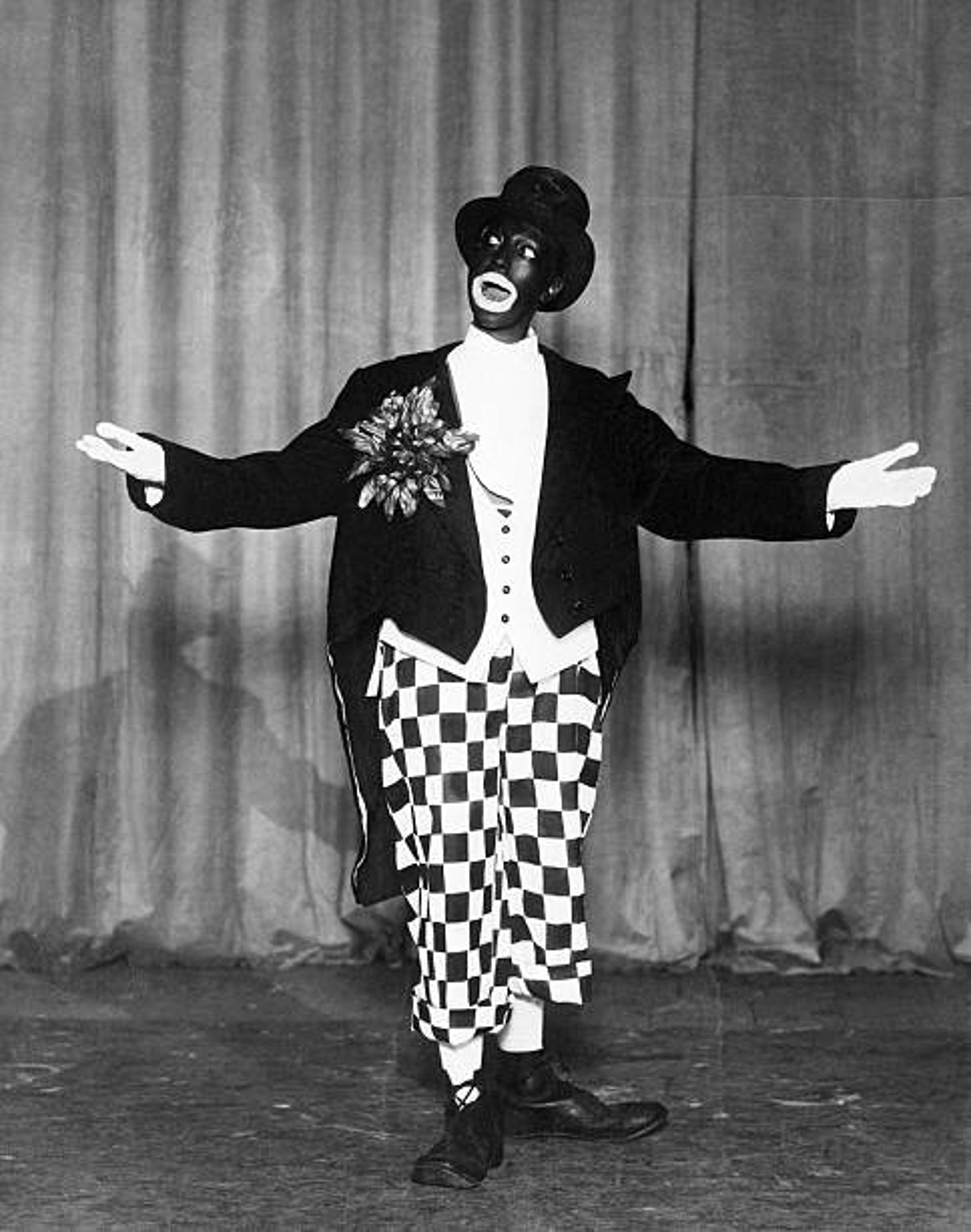
Baker impersonating Johnny Hudgins at the Folies Bergère in 1927

In Shuffle Along, Baker was a dancer at the end of a chorus line. Fearing she might be overshadowed by the others, she used her position to ad-lib, introducing a hint of comedy into her routine, making her stand out from her fellow dancers, thus going off-script, yet engaging audiences. She began in Shuffle Along with one of the U.S. touring companies, but, once she came of age, she was transferred to the Broadway production, where she remained for several months, until the show closed in 1923. Next, Baker was cast in The Chocolate Dandies, a revue that opened on September 1, 1924. Again, she was relegated to the chorus line. The show ran for 96 performances, finally closing on November 22, 1924.

One of the top attractions in The Chocolate Dandies was the mime dancer Johnny Hudgins. Hudgins found out that Baker was stealing his routines: "I used to go up to the balcony and I'd watch her," he later recalled, "and it was like seeing myself in a mirror. So the next night, I'd put in something new, and sure enough, she'd be doing the new thing the day after." (After having risen to stardom in Paris, she would impersonate Hudgins in her show at the Folies Bergère.)

=== Pre-war Paris and rise to fame ===
A 1936 interview with Baker in The New York Times reported that:

After the Plantation Club there was a Mrs. Caroline Dudley. "She was interested in art and she got up a Negro revue and took us to Europe." The "Revue Nègre" that was, bound for a tour of European capitals.

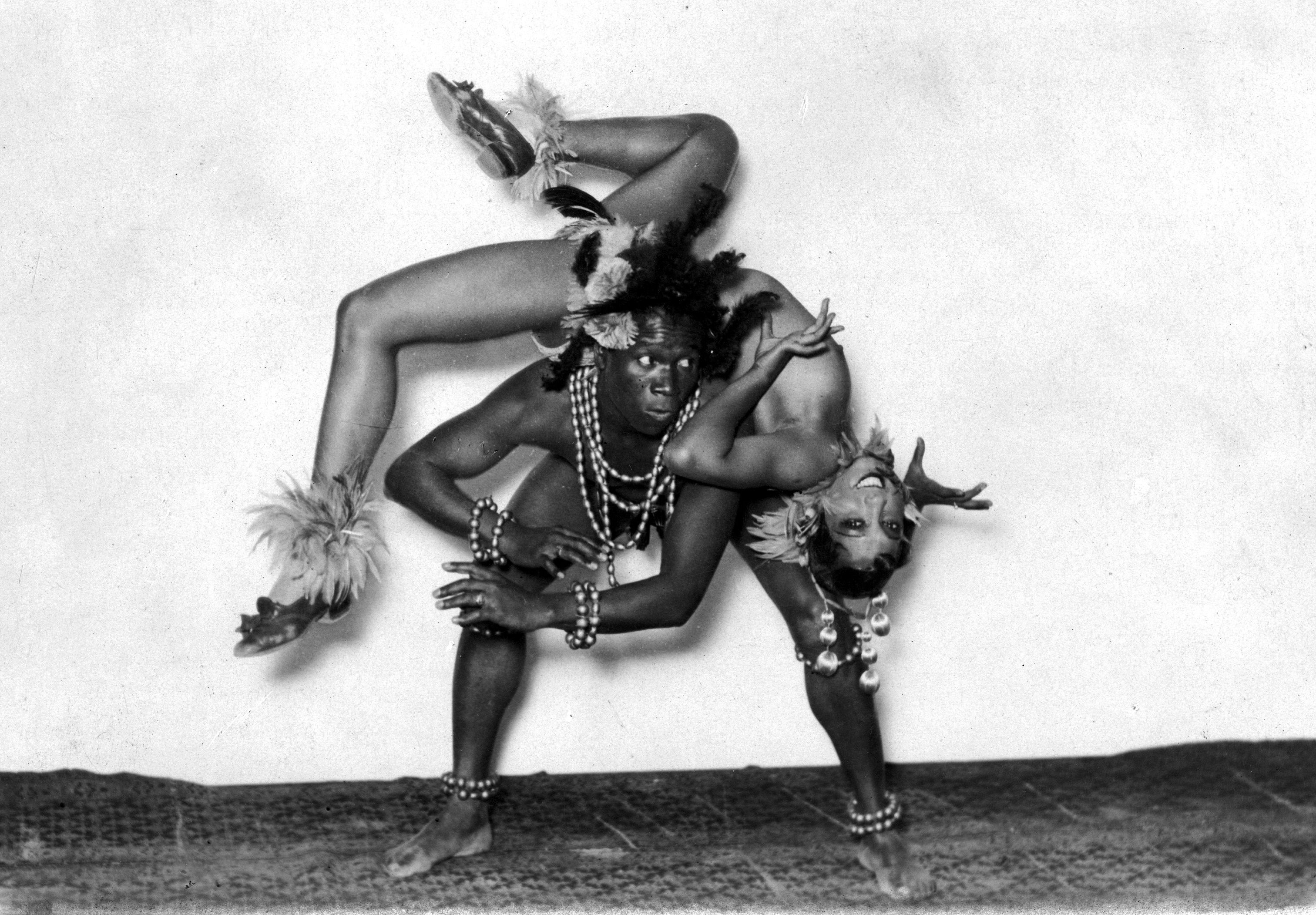
Baker, wearing only a feathered skirt and anklets, shoes, and a headdress, arches back over the forward-bent [[:fr:Joe Alex|Joe Alex]] in Danse sauvage.

- external image
- Josephine Baker, sitting on a tiger rug, circa 1925

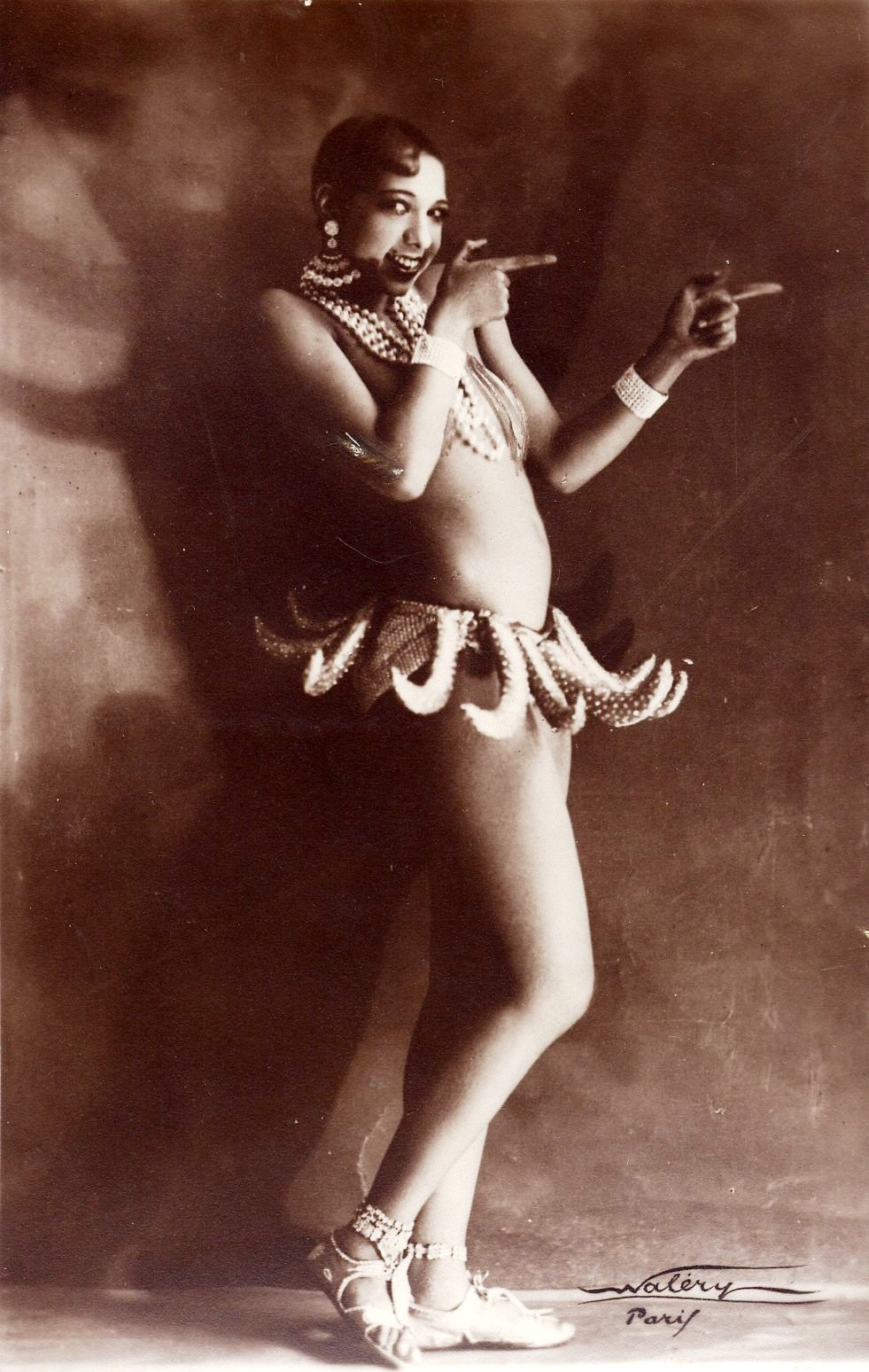
Baker in her banana costume, wearing little more than "strings of pearls, wrist cuffs, and a skirt with 16 rubber bananas", Folies Bergère revue Un vent de folie, 1927, photo by Lucien Waléry

Baker sailed to Paris in 1925 and opened on October 2 in La Revue Nègre at the Théâtre des Champs-Élysées, performing Danse sauvage with Joe Alex, wearing only a feathered skirt. She was 19 at the time. In a 1974 interview with The Guardian, she explained that her first big break came in this bustling European city:

No, I didn't get my first break on Broadway. I was only in the chorus in Shuffle Along and Chocolate Dandies. I became famous first in France in the twenties. I just couldn't stand America and I was one of the first coloured Americans to move to Paris. Oh yes, Bricktop was there as well. Me and her were the only two, and we had a marvellous time. Of course, everyone who was anyone knew Bricky. And they got to know Miss Baker as well.

In Paris, she became an instant success for her erotic dancing and for appearing practically nude onstage. After a successful tour of Europe, she broke her contract and returned to France in 1926 to star at the Folies Bergère, setting the standard for her future acts. In a 1926 performance in the revue La Folie du jour at the popular concert hall Folies Bergère, Baker first wore her iconic banana skirt costume.

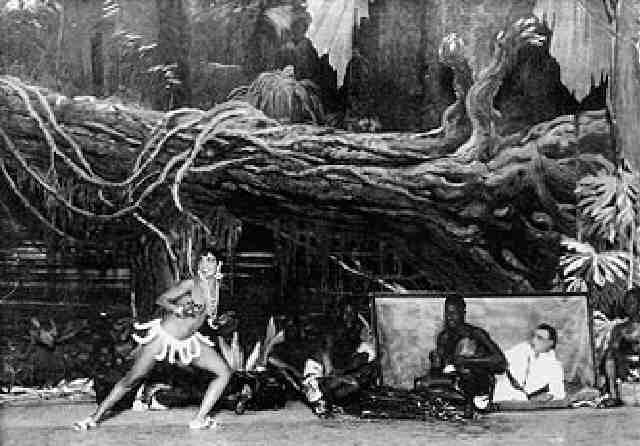
Baker performing Banana Dance, circa 1928

Baker's success coincided with the 1925 Exposition des Arts Décoratifs, which gave birth to the term "Art Deco", as well as a renewed interest in non-Western art forms, including those of African origin, which Baker would represent. In later shows in Paris, she was often accompanied on stage by her pet cheetah, "Chiquita", donning a diamond collar. Chiquita frequently escaped into the orchestra pit, terrorizing the musicians and adding another element of excitement to the show.

After a while, Baker became the most successful American entertainer in France. Ernest Hemingway called her "the most sensational woman anyone ever saw." The author spent hours talking with her in Parisian bars, Picasso depicted her alluring beauty, and Jean Cocteau became friendly with her. Baker endorsed a "Bakerfix" hair gel, as well as bananas, shoes, and cosmetics, among other products.

Arrival of Baker in The Hague, 1928

In 1929, Baker became the first African-American star to visit Yugoslavia, which she included on a tour through Central Europe via the Orient Express. In Belgrade, she performed at Luxor Balkanska, then the city's most luxurious venue. In a nod to local culture, she included a Pirot kilim in her routine and donated some of the show's proceeds to poor children of Serbia. In Zagreb, adoring crowds greeted her at the train station, but opposition from local clergy and morality police led to the cancellation of some of her shows.

During her travels in Yugoslavia, Baker was accompanied by "Count" Giuseppe "Pepito" Abatino. At the start of her career in France, Abatino, a Sicilian former stonemason who passed himself off as a count, persuaded her to let him manage her. He became not only Baker's manager, but her lover as well. The two could not marry because she was not yet divorced from her second husband, Billy Baker. In 1926, Abatino established the first Chez Josephine cabaret at 40 Rue Fontaine, in Montmartre, Paris, as a gift to Baker.

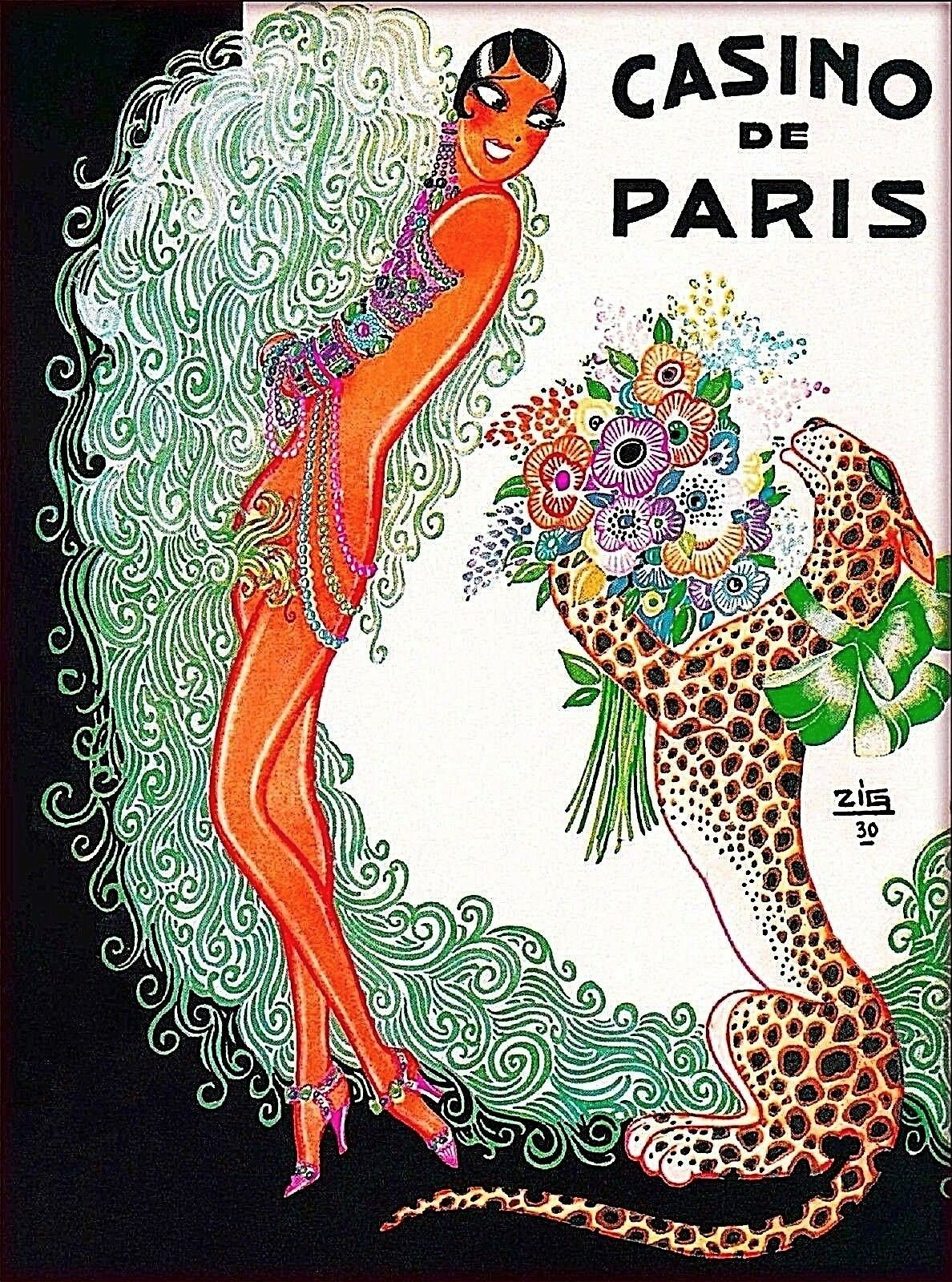
1930 drawing by Louis Gaudin, depicting Baker being presented a flower bouquet by a cheetah

In 1930, Baker sang professionally for the first time. During this period, she released her most successful song, "J'ai deux amours" (1930, "I have two loves: my country and Paris."). In a 2007 book, Tim Bergfelder, Sue Harris, and Sarah Street claimed that "by the 1930's, Baker's assimilation into French popular culture had been completed by her association with the song." She starred in four films, which found success only in Europe: the silent film Siren of the Tropics (1927), and the sound films Zouzou (1934), Princesse Tam Tam (1935), and Fausse alerte (1940). Bergfelder, Harris, and Street wrote that Siren of the Tropics "rehearses the 'primitive-to-Parisienne' narrative that would become the staple of Baker's cinema career, and exploited in particular her comic stage persona based on loose-limbed athleticism and artful clumsiness." Zouzou and Princesse Tam Tam were both star vehicles for Baker.

A stylized depiction of Baker in a poster by Jean Chassaing, from 1931.

Under the management of Abatino, Baker's stage and public persona, as well as her singing voice, were transformed. In 1934, she took the lead in a revival of Jacques Offenbach's opera La créole, which premiered in December of that year for a six-month run at the Théâtre Marigny on the Champs-Élysées of Paris. In preparation for her performances, she went through months of training with a vocal coach. In the words of Shirley Bassey, who has cited Baker as her primary influence, "... she went from a petite danseuse sauvage with a decent voice to la grande diva magnifique... I swear in all my life I have never seen, and probably never shall see again, such a spectacular singer and performer."

Despite her popularity in France, Baker never attained the equivalent reputation in America. Her star turn in a 1936 revival of "Ziegfeld Follies" on Broadway was not commercially successful, and later in the run she was replaced by Gypsy Rose Lee. Time magazine referred to her as a "Negro wench ... whose dancing and singing might be topped anywhere outside of Paris", while other critics said her voice was "too thin" and "dwarf-like" to fill the Winter Garden Theatre. She returned to Europe heartbroken. This contributed to Baker's becoming a legal citizen of France and giving up her American citizenship.

In 1936, Paul Derval (1880–1966) brought Baker from New York City to Paris to lead the revue En Super Folies, opening in October 1936. The show starred Baker in 1936, and continued in 1937. A film of En Super Folies was released.

In 1936, she established a second "Chez Josephine" cabaret in New York City, the first of which Baker had invested her own money. "Josephine Baker, the famous colored star who faintly shocked Paris with her daring stage appearances, is the owner of a supper-club in New York. It is called 'Chez Josephine Baker,' and on the opening night (25 February 1936), complete with paper snowballs, serpentine, and all the other weapons of all-night-club warfare, Josephine was handed a beribboned parcel that revealed a tiny snorting piglet in a crate" (November 2, 1936). On December 17, 1948, a Chez Josephine cabaret opened in Paris. In 1986, Jean-Claude Baker opened Chez Josephine in New York City.

In 1937, Baker married the French industrialist Jean Lion, thus becoming a French citizen. They were married in the French town of Crèvecœur-le-Grand, in a wedding presided over by the mayor, Jammy Schmidt.

Between 1933 and 1937, Baker was a guest at the start of the Tour de France on four occasions. After enduring severe hostility in Germany and Eastern Europe during the late 1920s—where she was targeted by storm troopers with ammonia bombs and told to "Go back to Africa"—she was spurred to actively participate in the French Resistance against the Nazis.

=== World War II ===
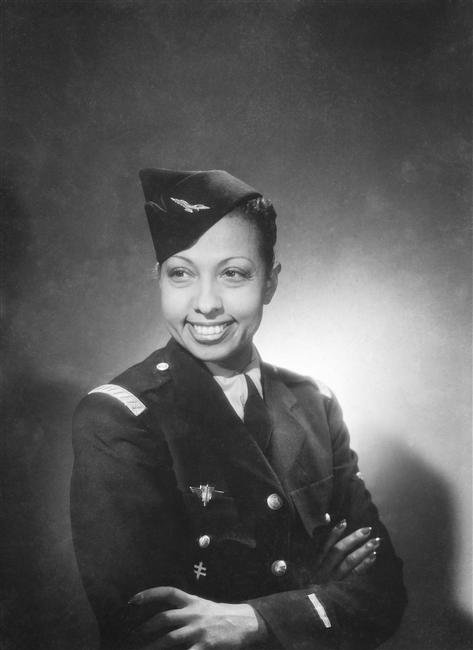
Baker in French Air Force uniform, 1948

In September 1939, when France declared war on Germany in response to the invasion of Poland, Baker was recruited by the Deuxième Bureau, the French military intelligence agency, as an "honorable correspondent". She worked with Jacques Abtey, the head of French counterintelligence in Paris. She socialized with the Germans at embassies, ministries, night clubs, charming them while secretly gathering information. Her café-society fame enabled her to rub shoulders with those in the know, from high-ranking Japanese officials to Italian and Vichy bureaucrats, reporting to Abtey what she heard. She attended parties and gathered information at the Italian embassy without raising suspicion. The Deuxième Bureau shared information with Wilfred Dunderdale at the Secret Intelligence Service (MI6) in London, and when it had to go underground, Baker reported to London directly; in North Africa she reported via the American diplomat spies to London. Baker's espionage work went beyond merely gathering information at social events. She had a pilot's license and during the Phoney War she flew missions. She collected detailed intelligence on German troop movements, as well as the locations and activities of airfields and harbors. Confident in her celebrity status and the protections it afforded, Baker believed she could operate without raising suspicion. To covertly transport sensitive information, she used methods such as writing notes on her hands and arms, pinning them inside her clothing, and using invisible ink. Her boldness paid off, allowing her to smuggle intelligence across borders and deliver critical reports to the French Resistance.

When the Germans invaded France in 1940, Baker left Paris and went to the Château des Milandes, her home in the Dordogne département in the south of France. The Château des Milandes became, especially in World War II, one of the most important hideaways; she would shelter resistance fighters and Jewish refugees, providing them with documents and even money for food, clothes, and forged documents she usually financed herself. Her estate also provided the center of French Resistance activities, including the installation of a radio transmitter in order to be in touch with the Allied forces and storing weapons in its cellar. As an entertainer, Baker had an excuse for moving around Europe, visiting neutral nations such as Portugal, as well as some in South America. She carried information for transmission to England, about airfields, harbors, and German troop concentrations in the West of France. Notes were written in invisible ink on Baker's sheet music. As described in Jazz Cleopatra, "She specialized in gatherings at embassies and ministries, charming people as she had always done, but at the same time trying to remember interesting items to transmit".

Later in 1941, she and her entourage went to the French colonies in North Africa. The stated reason was Baker's health (since she was recovering from another case of pneumonia), but the real reason was to continue helping the Resistance. From a base in Morocco, she made tours of Spain. She pinned notes with the information she gathered inside her underwear. She met the Pasha of Marrakech, whose support helped her through a miscarriage (the last of several). After the miscarriage, she developed an infection so severe it required a hysterectomy. The infection spread and she developed peritonitis and then sepsis. After her recovery (which she continued to fall in and out of), she started touring to entertain British, French, and American soldiers in North Africa. The Free French had no organized entertainment network for their troops, so Baker and her entourage managed for the most part on their own. They allowed no civilians and charged no admission.

When it was time to leave France, Abtey and Baker traveled to London via Lisbon. After the war, Baker was awarded the Resistance Medal by the French Committee of National Liberation, the Croix de Guerre by the French military, and was named a Chevalier of the Légion d'honneur by General Charles de Gaulle.

=== Post War ===
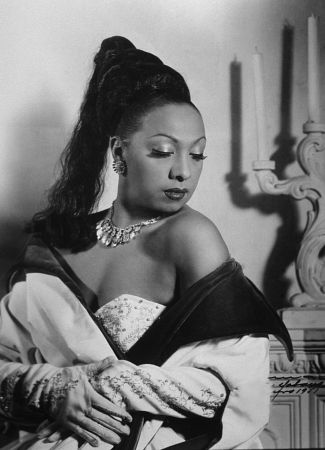
Baker in Havana, Cuba, in 1950

In 1949, a reinvented Baker returned in triumph to the Folies Bergère. Bolstered by recognition of her wartime heroism, Baker the performer assumed a new gravitas, unafraid to take on serious music or subject matter. The engagement was a rousing success and reestablished Baker as one of Paris' pre-eminent entertainers. In 1951, Baker was invited back to the United States for a nightclub engagement in Miami. After winning a public battle over desegregating the club's audience, Baker followed up her sold-out run at the club with a national tour. Rave reviews and enthusiastic audiences accompanied her everywhere, climaxed by a parade in Harlem in honor of her new title: NAACP's "Woman of the Year".

A 1951 incident at the Stork Club in New York in October 1951 interrupted and overturned her plans. Baker criticized the club's unwritten policy of discouraging Black patrons, then scolded columnist Walter Winchell, an old ally, for not rising to her defense. Winchell responded swiftly with a series of harsh public rebukes, including accusations of Communist sympathies (a serious charge at the time). The ensuing publicity caused many venues to cancel Baker's engagements.

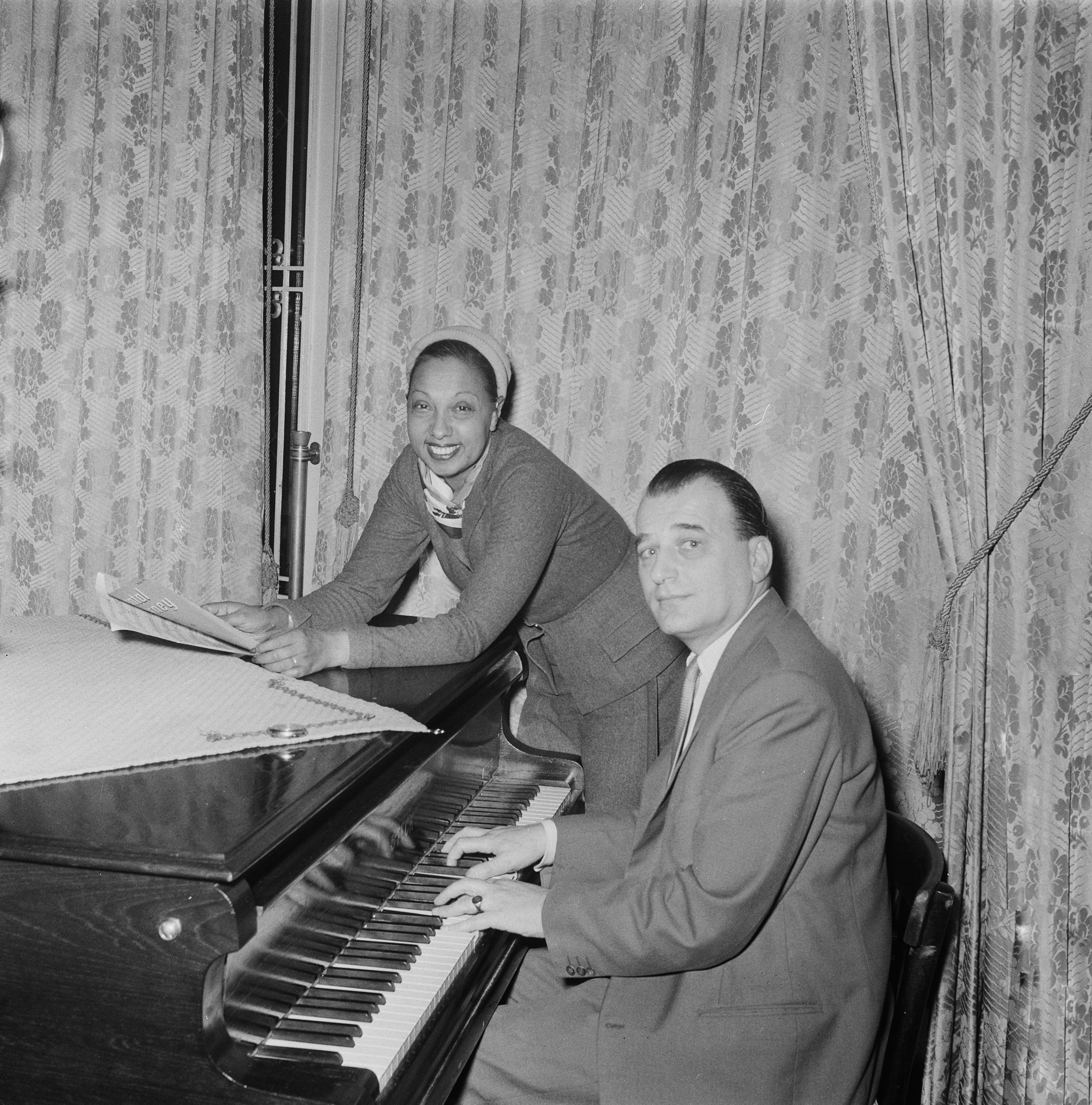
Baker and Jo Bouillon in Amsterdam, 1954

In 1952, Baker was hired to crown the Queen of the Cavalcade of Jazz for the famed eighth Cavalcade of Jazz concert held at Wrigley Field in Los Angeles, which was produced by Leon Hefflin, Sr. on June 1. Also featured to perform that day were Roy Brown and His Mighty Men, Anna Mae Winburn and Her Sweethearts, Toni Harper, Louis Jordan, Jimmy Witherspoon and Jerry Wallace.

In September 1952, Baker began a tour of Argentina. While there, she made statements denouncing the United States as a "false, Nazi-style democracy". In response, the U.S. Department of Immigration declared that if Baker attempted to reenter the United States she "would have to prove her right and worth." She returned to France, and was allowed entry into the U.S. only in 1963, after intervention by Attorney General Robert F. Kennedy.

In January 1966, Fidel Castro invited Baker to perform at the "Teatro Musical de La Habana" in Havana, Cuba, at the seventh-anniversary celebrations of his revolution. Her spectacular show in April broke attendance records. In 1968, Baker visited Yugoslavia and made appearances in Belgrade, Šibenik and Skopje. In her later career, Baker faced financial troubles. She commented, "Nobody wants me, they've forgotten me"; but family members encouraged her to continue performing. In 1973 she performed at Carnegie Hall to a standing ovation.

The following year, she appeared in a Royal Variety Performance at the London Palladium, and then at the Monegasque Red Cross Gala, celebrating her 50 years in French show business. Advancing years and exhaustion began to take their toll; she sometimes had trouble remembering lyrics, and her speeches between songs tended to ramble. However, she still continued to captivate audiences of all ages.

== Civil rights activism ==
Although based in France, Baker supported the American Civil Rights Movement during the 1950s. When she arrived in New York with her husband Jo, they were refused reservations at 36 hotels because of racial discrimination. This led her to write several articles about segregation in the United States. She also traveled in the South, giving a talk at Fisk University, a historically black college in Nashville, Tennessee, on "France, North Africa and the Equality of the Races in France". In the 1950s the FBI tracked everything she did, and opened a file on her. The intent of doing so was to deter other countries from allowing her to take the stage. During her travels to foreign countries, she would leverage her influence to bring light to the racial discrimination in the United States which created a rift between her and her homeland.

She refused to perform for segregated audiences in the United States, although she was offered $10,000 by a Miami club; the club eventually met her demands. Her insistence on mixed audiences helped to integrate live entertainment shows in the Las Vegas Valley. After this incident, she began receiving threatening phone calls from people claiming to be from the Ku Klux Klan but said publicly that she was not afraid of them.

In October 1951, Baker made charges of racism against Sherman Billingsley's Stork Club in Manhattan, where she had been refused service. She criticized the influential journalist Walter Winchell, who had been seated nearby and observed the incident but failed to intervene. In response, Winchell launched a media attack on her. He labeled her as an anti-American communist sympathizer, which turned the public attention away from the discrimination she had to face. Undaunted by such opposition, she continued to use her platform to advocate for civil rights and challenge systemic injustice. Actress Grace Kelly, who was also at the club at the time, rushed over to Baker, took her by the arm and stormed out with her entire party, vowing never to return (although she returned on January 3, 1956, with Prince Rainier of Monaco). The two women became close friends after the incident. When Baker was near bankruptcy, Kelly—by then the princess consort—offered her a villa and financial assistance. (Note: Jean-Claude Baker states that Kelly and Baker had never met before Baker lost her château in 1969 (not 1968), whereupon Kelly paid for a house, Villa Maryvonne, for her in Roquebrune, on the French side of the border between France and Monaco.)

Baker also worked with the NAACP. Her reputation as a crusader grew to such an extent that the NAACP had Sunday, May 20, 1951, declared "Josephine Baker Day". She was presented with life membership with the NAACP by Nobel Peace Prize winner Ralph Bunche. The honor she was paid spurred her to further her crusading efforts with the "Save Willie McGee" rally. McGee was a black man in Mississippi convicted of raping a white woman in 1945 on the basis of dubious evidence, and sentenced to death. Baker attended rallies for McGee and wrote letters to Fielding Wright, the governor of Mississippi, asking him to spare McGee's life. Despite her efforts, McGee was executed in 1951. As the decorated war hero who was bolstered by the racial equality she experienced in Europe, Baker became increasingly regarded as controversial; some black people even began to shun her, fearing that her outspokenness and racy reputation from her earlier years would hurt the cause.

In 1957, Baker gave a speech at the Paulskirche in Frankfurt, criticizing racial discrimination.

In 1963, she spoke at the March on Washington at the side of Rev. Martin Luther King Jr. Baker was the only official female speaker. While wearing her Free French uniform emblazoned with her medal of the Légion d'honneur, she introduced the "Negro Women for Civil Rights". Rosa Parks and Daisy Bates were among those she acknowledged, and both gave brief speeches. Not everyone involved wanted Baker present at the March; some thought her time overseas had made her a woman of France, one who was disconnected from the Civil Rights issues going on in America. In her speech, one of the things Baker said:

I have walked into the palaces of kings and queens, and into the houses of presidents and much more. But I could not walk into a hotel in America and get a cup of coffee, and that made me mad. And when I get mad, you know that I open my big mouth. And then look out, 'cause when Josephine opens her mouth, they hear it all over the world...

After King's assassination, his widow Coretta Scott King approached Baker in the Netherlands to ask if she would take her husband's place as leader of the Civil Rights Movement. After many days of thinking it over, Baker declined, saying her children were "too young to lose their mother."

== Personal life ==
=== Relationships ===
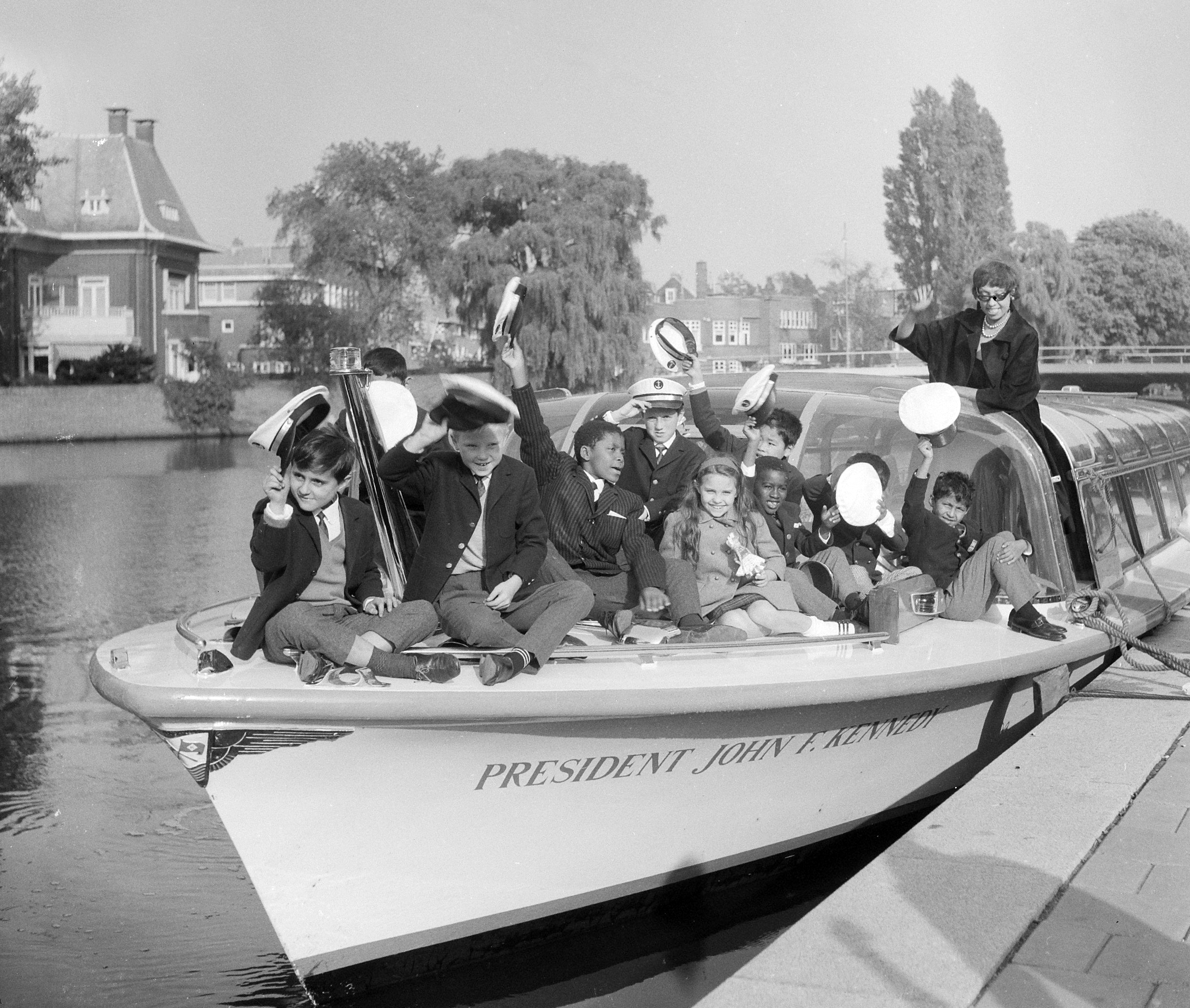
Baker with ten of her adopted children, 1964

Baker's first marriage was to American Pullman porter Willie Wells when she was only 13 years old. The union was reportedly very unhappy, and the couple divorced soon after marrying. Another short-lived marriage followed in 1921, to William Howard Baker. Since her career was already taking off under that last name, she retained it after the divorce. Jean-Claude Baker wrote that Josephine was bisexual and had several relationships with women.

In 1925, she allegedly began an extramarital relationship with the Belgian novelist Georges Simenon. On an ocean liner, in 1929, en route from South America to France, Baker had an affair with the Swiss-French architect Le Corbusier (Charles-Édouard Jeanneret). In 1937, Baker married Frenchman Jean Lion, but they separated in 1940. She married French composer and conductor Jo Bouillon in 1947 around the time she adopted her 11th child; their union lasted 14 years before also ending in divorce. Later, she was involved with the artist Robert Brady for a time, but they never married. Speculation exists that Baker was also involved in sexual liaisons, if not relationships, with blues singer Clara Smith, Ada "Bricktop" Smith, French novelist Colette, and Frida Kahlo.

=== Children ===
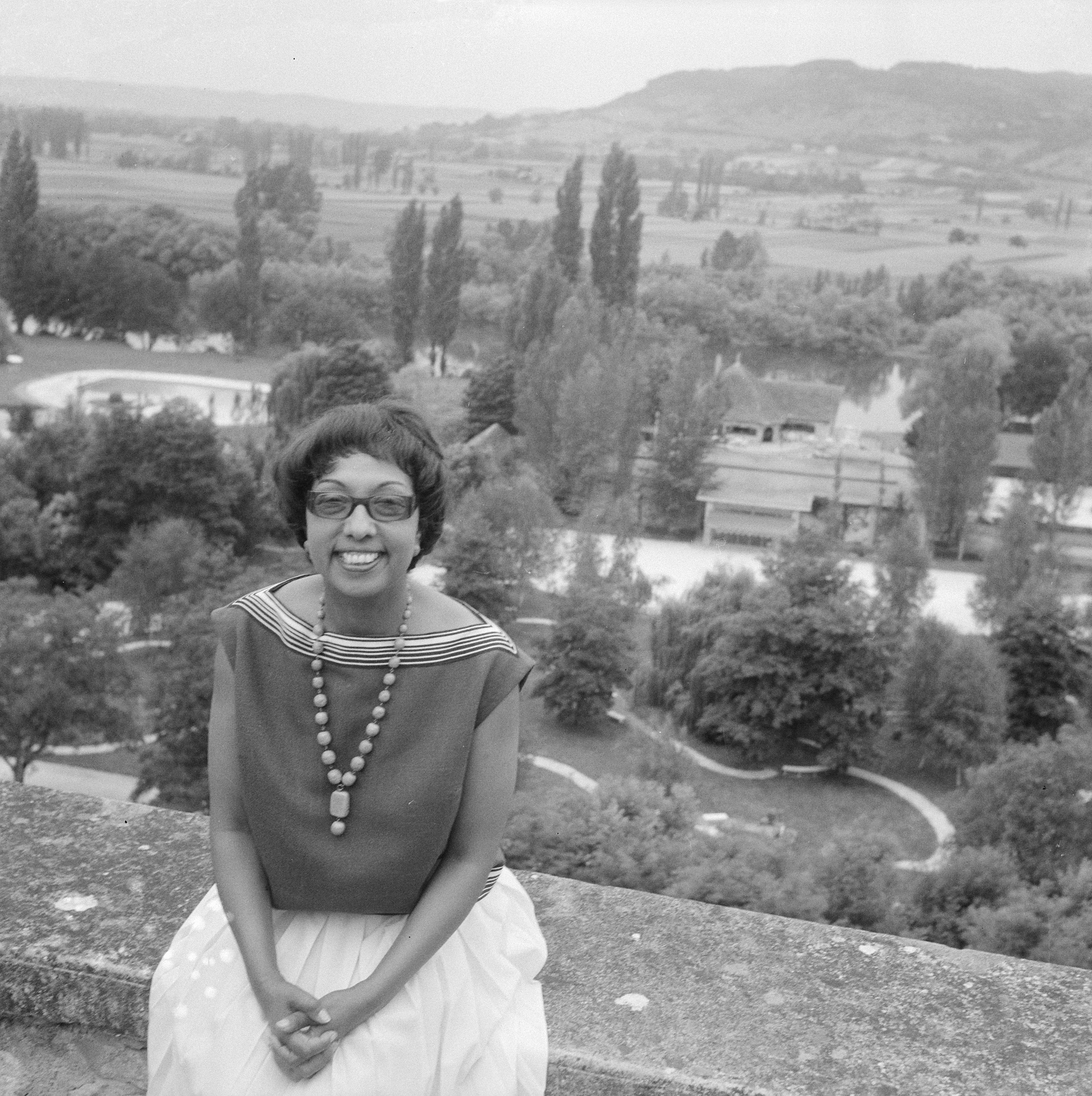
Baker at the Château des Milandes, 1961

During her participation in the civil rights movement, Baker began to adopt children, forming a family which she often referred to as the "Rainbow Tribe". (Note: Jean-Claude Baker writes that, according to the son of a famous gynecologist who examined her, she could not conceive a child due to a congenital malformation of the uterus.) Baker wanted to prove that "children of different ethnicities and religions could still be brothers." She often took the children with her cross-country, and when they were at Château des Milandes, she arranged tours so visitors could walk the grounds and see how natural and happy the children were in the Rainbow Tribe. Her estate featured hotels, a farm, rides, and the children singing and dancing for the audience. She charged an admission fee to visitors who entered and partook in the activities, which included watching the children play.

She created dramatic backstories for them, picking them with clear intent in mind: at one point, she wanted and planned to adopt a Jewish baby, but she settled for a non-Jewish French one. She also raised them in different religions in order to further her model for the world, taking two children from Algeria and raising one child as a Muslim and raising the other child as a Catholic. One member of the Tribe, Jean-Claude Baker, said: "She wanted a doll".

Baker raised two daughters, French-born Marianne and Moroccan-born Stellina, and 10 sons, Japanese-born Janot (born Teruya) and Akio, Colombian-born Luis, Finnish-born Jari (now Jarry), French-born Jean-Claude, Noël, and Moïse, Algerian-born Brahim (later Brian), Ivorian-born Koffi, and Venezuelan-born Mara. Later on, Josephine Baker would become the legal guardian of another boy, also named Jean-Claude, and considered him an unofficial addition to the Rainbow Tribe. For some time, Baker lived with her children and an enormous staff in the château in Dordogne, France, with her fourth husband, Jo Bouillon. Bouillon claimed that Baker bore one child, though it was stillborn in 1941, an incident that precipitated an emergency hysterectomy.

Baker forced Jarry to leave the château and live with his adoptive father, Jo Bouillon, in Argentina, at the age of 15, after discovering that he was gay (though it appears that the two were able to reconcile in later years.) Moïse died of cancer in 1999, and Noël was diagnosed with schizophrenia and was in a psychiatric hospital as of 2009. Jean-Claude Baker, the unofficial addition to the Rainbow Tribe, died by suicide in 2015, aged 71.

== Later years and death ==
Baker was a Freemason, having been initiated into the Women's Grand Lodge of France in 1960.

In her later years Baker converted to Catholicism. In 1968, Baker lost her château owing to unpaid debts; afterwards Princess Grace offered her an apartment in Roquebrune, near Monaco.

Baker was back on stage at the Olympia in Paris in 1968, in Belgrade and at Carnegie Hall in 1973 and at the Royal Variety Performance at the London Palladium and at the "Gala du Cirque" in Paris in 1974. On April 8, 1975, Baker starred in a retrospective revue at the Bobino in Paris, "Joséphine à Bobino 1975" celebrating her 50 years in show business. The revue, financed by Prince Rainier, Princess Grace, and Jacqueline Kennedy Onassis, opened to critical acclaim. The opening-night audience included Sophia Loren, Mick Jagger, Shirley Bassey, Diana Ross and Liza Minnelli.

Four days later, Baker was found in her bed in a coma after suffering a cerebral hemorrhage. She was taken to Pitié-Salpêtrière Hospital, where she died, aged 68, on April 12, 1975.

Baker received a full Catholic funeral at L'Église de la Madeleine, attracting more than 20,000 mourners. The only American-born woman to receive full French military honors at her funeral, which was the occasion of a large procession. After a family service at Saint-Charles Church in Monte Carlo, Baker was interred at the Cimetière de Monaco.

In 2021, Baker's body was interned in the Pantheon in Paris in recognition of her contributions to the French resistance during World War II. A ceremony was held on November 21, 2021

== Legacy ==
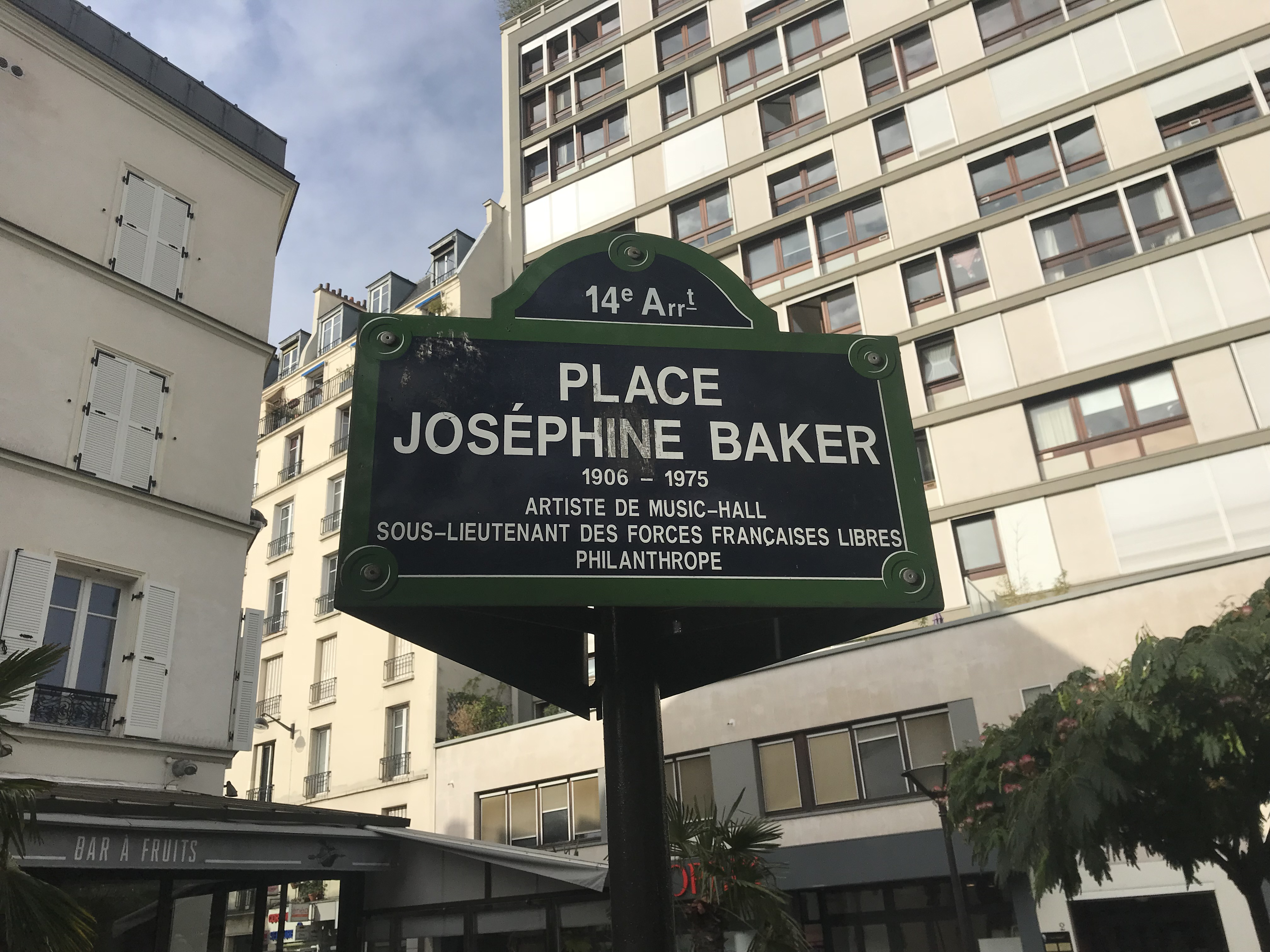
Place Joséphine Baker in Paris 48°50′29″N 2°19′26″E

Place Joséphine Baker in the Montparnasse Quarter of Paris was named in her honor. She has also been inducted into the St. Louis Walk of Fame, and on March 29, 1995, into the Hall of Famous Missourians. St. Louis's Channing Avenue was renamed Josephine Baker Boulevard, and a wax sculpture of Baker is on permanent display at The Griot Museum of Black History.

In 2015, she was inducted into the Legacy Walk in Chicago, Illinois. The Piscine Joséphine Baker is a swimming pool along the banks of the Seine in Paris named after her.

Writing in the online BBC Magazine in late 2014, Darren Royston, historical dance teacher at RADA, credited Baker with being the Beyoncé of her day, and bringing the Charleston to the United Kingdom. Two of Baker's sons, Jean-Claude and Jarry (Jari), grew up to go into business together, running the restaurant Chez Josephine on Theatre Row, 42nd Street, New York City. It celebrates Baker's life and works.

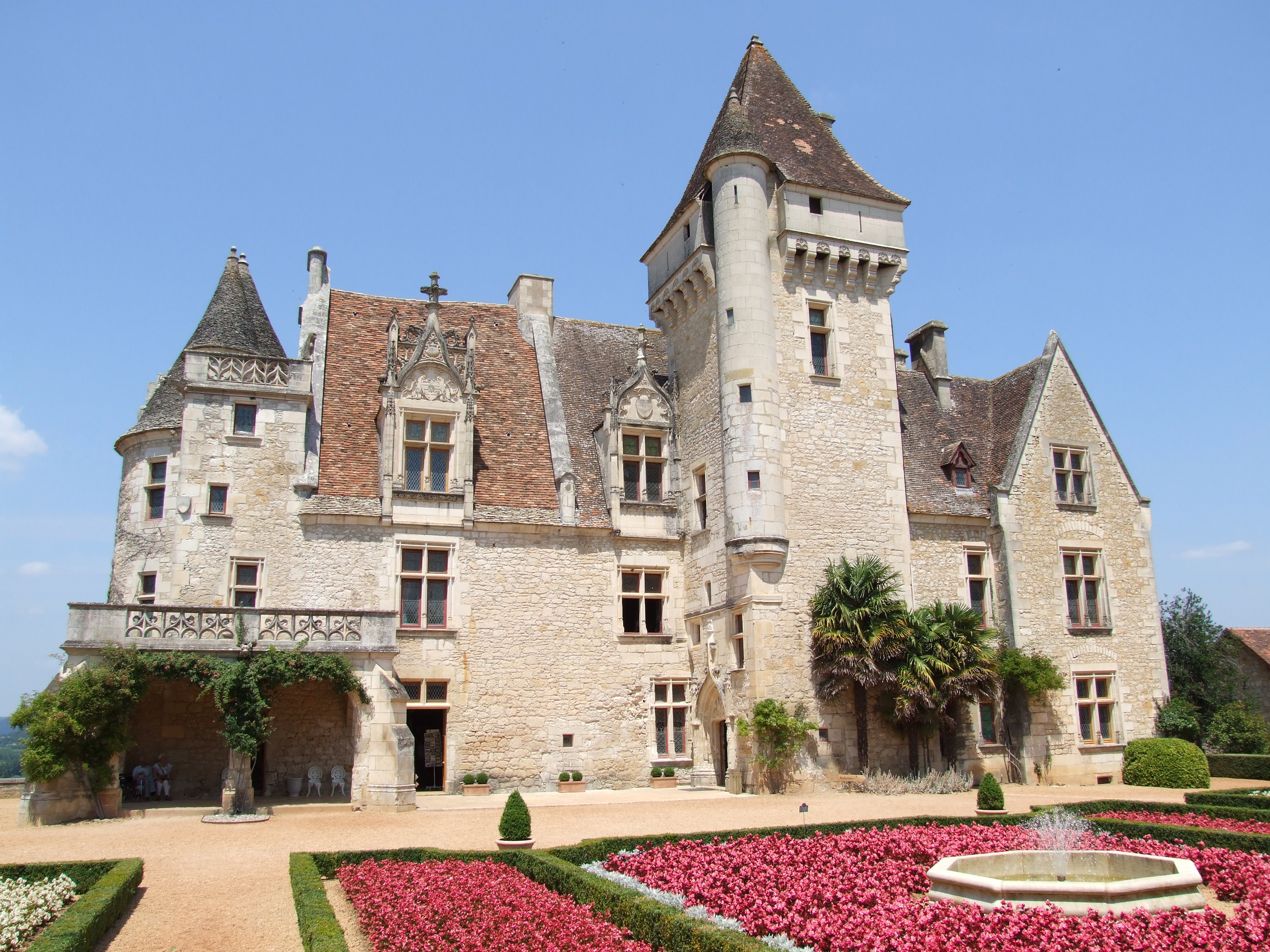
Château des Milandes, which Baker rented from 1940, before purchasing in 1947.

Château des Milandes, a castle near Sarlat in the Dordogne, was Baker's home where she raised her twelve children. It is open to the public and displays her stage outfits including her banana skirt (of which there are apparently several). It also displays many family photographs and documents as well as her Legion of Honour medal. Most rooms are open for the public to walk through including bedrooms with the cots where her children slept, a huge kitchen, and a dining room where she often entertained large groups. The bathrooms were designed in art deco style but most rooms retained the French château style.

Baker continued to influence celebrities more than a century after her birth. In a 2003 interview with USA Today, Angelina Jolie cited Baker as "a model for the multiracial, multinational family she was beginning to create through adoption." Beyoncé performed Baker's banana dance at the Fashion Rocks concert at Radio City Music Hall in September 2006.

As a commemoration of Baker's one hundredth birthday, a multi-media performance was written and shown in 2006. The following year, Josephine Baker: A Life of Le Jazz Hot! was recorded from the Baker inspired production by Imani Winds.

Writing on the 110th anniversary of her birth, Vogue described how her 1926 "danse sauvage" in her famous banana skirt "brilliantly manipulated the white male imagination" and "radically redefined notions of race and gender through style and performance in a way that continues to echo throughout fashion and music today, from Prada to Beyoncé."

On June 3, 2017, the 111th anniversary of her birth, Google released an animated Google Doodle, which consists of a slideshow chronicling her life and achievements.

On Thursday, November 22, 2018, a documentary entitled Josephine Baker: The Story of an Awakening, directed by Ilana Navaro, premiered at the Beirut Art Film Festival. It contains rarely seen archival footage, including some never before discovered, with music and narration.

In August 2019, Baker was one of those inducted in the Rainbow Honor Walk, a walk of fame in San Francisco's Castro District noting LGBTQ people who have "made significant contributions in their fields".

The Staatliche Museen zu Berlin (Berlin State Museums) hosted an exhibition "Josephine Baker: Icon in Motion" from January 26 through April 28, 2024. The show displays photographs, film, and drawings covering her entertainment career through her involvement in civil rights. The exhibit includes Baker inspired works by her contemporaries.

Josephine Baker appears on the French 20-cent euro coins released in March 2024.

=== Panthéon in Paris ===
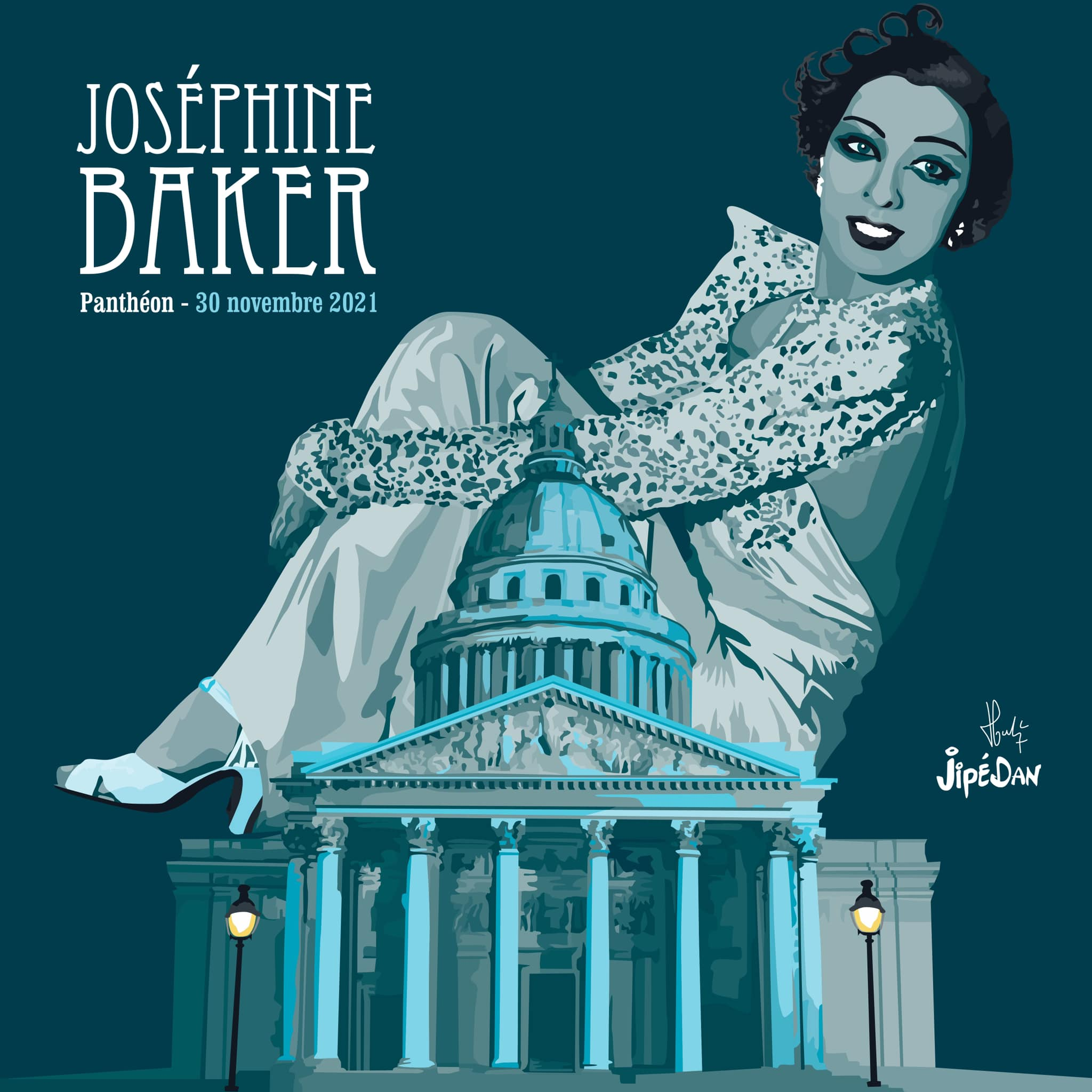
A 2021 illustration by artist JipéDan in support of the effort to reinter Baker in the Panthéon.

In May 2021, an online petition was set up by writer Laurent Kupferman asking that Joséphine Baker be honoured by being reinterred at the Panthéon in Paris or being granted Panthéon honours, which would make her only the sixth woman at the mausoleum alongside Simone Veil, Geneviève de Gaulle-Anthonioz, Marie Curie, Germaine Tillion, and Sophie Berthelot. In August 2021 the French President, Emmanuel Macron, announced that Baker's remains would be reburied at the Panthéon in November 2021, following the petition and continued requests from Baker's family since 2013. Her son Claude Bouillon-Baker, however, told Agence France-Presse that her body would remain in Monaco and only a plaque would be installed at the Panthéon. It was later announced that a symbolic casket containing soil from various locations where Baker had lived, including St. Louis, Paris, the South of France and Monaco, would be carried by the French Air and Space Force in a parade in Paris before a ceremony at the Panthéon where the casket was interred. The ceremony took place on Tuesday, November 30, 2021, and Baker thus became the first black woman to be honored in the secular temple to the "great men" of the French Republic.

== Works by Baker ==
- de la Cámara, Félix Achille; Abatino, Pepito; Baker, Josephine (1931). Mon sang dans tes veines: roman d'après une idée de Joséphine Baker (in French). Paris: Les editions Isis.

== Works portraying or inspired by Baker ==
=== Film and television ===
Diana Ross portrayed Baker in her Tony Award-winning Broadway and television show An Evening with Diana Ross. When the show was made into an NBC television special entitled The Big Event: An Evening with Diana Ross, Ross again portrayed Baker. In the 1981 film Das Boot, a German submariner mimics Baker's Danse banane. In 1991, Baker's life story, The Josephine Baker Story, was broadcast on HBO. Lynn Whitfield portrayed Baker, and won an Emmy Award for Outstanding Lead Actress in a Miniseries or a Special—becoming the first Black actress to win the award in this category. In the 1997 animated musical film Anastasia, Baker appears with her cheetah during the musical number "Paris Holds the Key (to Your Heart)". In 2002, Baker was portrayed by Karine Plantadit in the biopic Frida. A character who is based on Baker (topless, wearing the famous "banana skirt") appears in the opening sequence of the 2003 animated film The Triplets of Belleville (Les Triplettes de Belleville).

Her influence upon and assistance to the careers of the husband and wife dancers Carmen De Lavallade and Geoffrey Holder are discussed and illustrated in rare footage in the 2005 Linda Atkinson/Nick Doob documentary, Carmen and Geoffrey. In 2011, Sonia Rolland portrayed Baker in the film Midnight in Paris. In February 2017, Tiffany Daniels portrayed Baker in the "Timeless" television episode "The Lost Generation". In May 2020, Astrid Jones portrayed Baker in the El ministerio del tiempo television episode "La memoria del tiempo" (The memory of time). Baker is portrayed by actress Carra Patterson in "I Am.", the seventh episode of HBO's television series Lovecraft Country.

A biopic about the life of Josephine Baker was announced in November 2022. It will be directed by French director Maïmouna Doucouré and produced by French production company Studiocanal, with FKA Twigs portraying Baker.

=== Stage ===
In 1986, Helen Gelzer portrayed Baker on the concept album Josephine – "a musical version of the life and times of Josephine Baker" with book, lyrics and music by Michael Wild. The musical director was Paul Maguire. The album was produced in conjunction with Baker's longtime friend Jack Hockett and Premier Box Office. A West End stage production of Josephine was premiered at the Fortune Theatre on June 4, 1989. It was produced by Ian Liston and financed in conjunction with Jack Hockett and Premier Box Office. Jack Hockett died in 1988 before the show was staged. Heather Gillespie played the lead role of Josephine Baker, and Baker's husband Pepito was played by Roland Alexander. Peggy Phango played Bricktop.

In 2006, Jérôme Savary produced a musical, A La Recherche de Josephine – New Orleans for Ever (Looking for Josephine), starring Nicolle Rochelle. The story revolved around the history of jazz and Baker's career. Also in 2006, Deborah Cox starred in the musical Josephine at Florida's Asolo Theatre, directed and choreographed by Joey McKneely, with a book by Ellen Weston and Mark Hampton, music by Steve Dorff and lyrics by John Bettis. In July 2012, Cheryl Howard opened in The Sensational Josephine Baker, written and performed by Howard and directed by Ian Streicher at the Beckett Theatre of Theatre Row on 42nd Street in New York City, just a few doors away from Chez Josephine. In July 2013, Cush Jumbo's debut play Josephine and I premiered at the Bush Theatre, London. It was re-produced in New York City at The Public Theater's Joe's Pub from February 27 to April 5, 2015.

In June 2016, Josephine, a burlesque cabaret dream play starring Tymisha Harris as Josephine Baker premiered at the 2016 San Diego Fringe Festival. The show has since played across North America and had a limited off-Broadway run in January–February 2018 at SoHo Playhouse in New York City. In late February 2017, a new play about Baker's later years, The Last Night of Josephine Baker by playwright Vincent Victoria, opened in Houston, Texas, starring Erica Young as "Past Josephine" and Jasmin Roland as "Present Josephine". Actress DeQuina Moore portrayed Baker in a biographic musical titled Josephine Tonight at The Ensemble Theatre in Houston, Texas, from June 27 to July 28, 2019. In September 2021, Theatre Royal, Bath, in conjunction with Oxford Playhouse and Wales Millennium Centre produced a UK touring production of Josephine co-written by Leona Allen and Jesse Briton who also directed the show. It toured the UK and featured Ebony Feare in the lead role as Josephine Baker.

Since 2016, Dynamite Lunchbox Entertainment of Orlando Florida has been touring Josephine, a burlesque cabaret dream play, co-created by and starring Tymisha Harris, to Fringe Festivals around Canada and the U.S. It played at the Montreal Fringe Festival in 2022. It was part of the 2022–2023 official season at the Segal Centre for the Performing Arts in Montreal (Spring 2023) as Josephine, A Musical Cabaret.

=== Literature ===
Author Sherry Jones portrays Baker's life and times in her 2018 biographical novel Josephine Baker's Last Dance. Baker appears in her role as a member of the French Resistance in Johannes Mario Simmel's 1960 novel, Es muss nicht immer Kaviar sein (C'est pas toujours du caviar). The 2004 erotic novel Scandalous by British author Angela Campion uses Baker as its heroine and is inspired by Baker's sexual exploits and later adventures in the French Resistance. In the novel, Baker, working with a fictional Black Canadian lover named Drummer Thompson, foils a plot by French fascists in 1936 Paris. Baker was heavily featured in the 2012 book Josephine's Incredible Shoe & The Blackpearls by Peggi Eve Anderson-Randolph. In his novel Noire, la neige, Marseille, Editions Parenthèses, ISBN 978-2-86364-648-9, Pascal Rannou evokes the relationship between Valaida Snow and Josephine Baker, who is one of the main characters of this story.

=== Music ===
Actress Phylicia Rashad's 1978 disco concept album Josephine Superstar is a biographical dedication to Baker's legacy. The lyrics detail Baker's life, including her youth, career, and romances in St. Louis, Broadway, and Paris. Arranged by French producers Morali, Belolo, and her then-husband Victor Willis, it was released by Casablanca Records and peaked at #28 on the Billboard disco charts. Backing vocals were sung by The Ritchie Family and Village People. The album cover features Rashad dressed in Baker's banana outfit.

The Italian-Belgian francophone singer composer Salvatore Adamo pays tribute to Baker with the song "Noël Sur Les Milandes" (album Petit Bonheur – EMI 1970). The British band Sailor paid tribute on their 1974 self-titled debut album Sailor with the Georg Kajanus song "Josephine Baker" who "...stunned the world at the Folies Bergère..." The title track of the 1987 Premiata Forneria Marconi album Miss Baker was written in honor of the American dancer Josephine Baker. British singer-songwriter Al Stewart wrote "Josephine Baker" about her, a song which appears on the album Last Days of the Century, from 1988.

Beyoncé Knowles has portrayed Baker on various occasions. During the 2006 Fashion Rocks show, Knowles performed "Dejá Vu" in a revised version of the Danse banane costume. In Knowles's video for "Naughty Girl", she is seen dancing in a huge champagne glass à la Baker. In I Am ... Yours: An Intimate Performance at Wynn Las Vegas, Beyoncé lists Baker as an influence of a section of her live show. In 2010, Keri Hilson portrayed Baker in her single "Pretty Girl Rock". In January 2022, Laquita Mitchell sang the title role in the New Orleans Opera production of Josephine by Tom Cipullo.

=== Artworks ===
In 1927, Alexander Calder created Josephine Baker (III), a wire sculpture of Baker, which is now displayed at the Museum of Modern Art. A nude portrait of Baker by Jean de Botton was the "cynosure for all eyes" when it was shown at the Salon d'Automne in Paris in 1931. When auctioned in Paris in 2021 the painting set a world record (EUR 179,200) for the artist. Henri Matisse created a mural-sized cut paper artwork titled La Négresse (1952–1953), possibly inspired by Baker. Hassan Musa depicted Baker in a 1994 series of paintings called Who needs Bananas? Season 14 of the Duolingo French Podcast is titled The Secret Life of Josephine Baker. The season finale was released in November 2023.

=== Documentaries ===
In 2006, Annette von Wangenheim directed the documentary Joséphine Baker: Black Diva in a White Mans World, about Baker's life and work from a perspective that analyses images of Black people in popular culture.

In 2007, Mark Miller published his biography of Valaida Snow: High Hat, Trumpet and Rhythm: The Life and Music of Valaida Snow (Toronto: The Mercury Press ISBN 9781551281278), in which he evokes Valaida's partnership and rivalry with Joséphine Baker: p. 8, 38, 44–45, 52, 57, 61, 94, 107, 120–121.

In 2018, Josephine Baker: The Story of an Awakening (French: Joséphine Baker, première icône noire), a French documentary directed by Ilana Navaro, premiered at the Beirut Art Film Festival in 2018, later broadcast on, including: PBS, ARTE, and Yle.

In 2022, Damien Lewis published a detailed account of her spying role in World War II in Agent Josephine: American beauty, French hero, British spy, two years after the French government released the secret files of their WWII espionage activity.

== Film credits ==
Film credits for Josephine Baker
Year	Title	Role	Notes	Ref.
1927	La Sirène des Tropiques (Siren of the Tropics)	Papitou	silent film	
1927	Die Frauen von Folies Bergères (The Woman from the Folies Bergères)		silent film	
1927	La revue des revues (Parisian Pleasures)	herself		
1928	Le pompier des Folies Bergères	unnamed	erotic short	
1934	Zouzou	Zouzou		
1935	Princesse Tam Tam	Aouina		
1945	False Alarm	Zazu Clairon		
1941	Moulin Rouge			
1954	An jedem Finger zehn (Ten on Every Finger)			
1955	Carosello del varietà (Carousel of Variety)			

== Bibliography ==
- "The Josephine Baker collection, 1926–2001". Stanford University Libraries. Archived from the original on April 27, 2011.
- Atwood, Kathryn J. & Olson, Sarah (2011). Women Heroes of World War II: 26 Stories of Espionage, Sabotage, Resistance, and Rescue. Chicago: Chicago Review Press. ISBN 978-1-55652-961-0.
- Baker, Jean-Claude & Chase, Chris (1993). Josephine: The Hungry Heart. New York: Cooper Square Press. ISBN 9780815411727.
- Baker, Jean-Claude & Chase, Chris (1995). Josephine: The Josephine Baker Story. Adams Media Corp. ISBN 978-1-55850-472-1.
- Baker, Josephine & Bouillon, Jo (1995). Josephine. Marlowe & Co. ISBN 978-1-56924-978-9.
- Bergfelder, Tim; Harris, Sue & Street, Sarah (2007). "French Cinema in the 1930s: Space, Place, and National Identity". Film Architecture and the Transnational Imagination: Set Design in 1930s European Cinema. Amsterdam University Press. JSTOR j.ctt46mscn.7.
- Bonini, Emmanuel (2000). La veritable Josephine Baker. Paris: Pigmalean Gerard Watelet. ISBN 978-2-85704-616-5.
- Dittmer, John (1994). Local People: The Struggle for Civil Rights in Mississippi. Champaign: University of Illinois Press. ISBN 978-0-252-06507-1.
- Francis, Terri Simone (2021). Josephine Baker's Cinematic Prism. Indiana University Press. doi:10.2307/j.ctv1dc9k61. ISBN 978-0-253-22338-8. S2CID 243157615.
- Guterl, Matthew (2014). Josephine Baker and the Rainbow Tribe. Cambridge, Massachusetts: Belknap Press. ISBN 978-0-674-04755-6.
- Hammond O'Connor, Patrick (1988). Josephine Baker. Jonathan Cape. ISBN 978-0-224-02441-9.
- Haney, Lynn (2002) [1995]. Naked at the Feast: A Biography of Josephine Baker. London: Robson Books. ISBN 978-1-86105-507-1.
- Jules-Rosette, Bennetta (2006). Josephine Baker: Image and Icon. Reedy Press. ISBN 978-1-933370-02-6.
- Jules-Rosette, Bennetta (2007). Josephine Baker in Art and Life. Urbana and Chicago, Ill.: University of Illinois Press. ISBN 978-0-252-07412-7.
- Kraut, Anthea (October 17, 2003). "Between Primitivism and Diaspora: The Dance Performances of Josephine Baker, Zora Neale Hurston, and Katherine Dunham". Theatre Journal. 55 (3): 433–450. doi:10.1353/tj.2003.0125. S2CID 194074254.
- Lewis, Damien (2022). Agent Josephine: American Beauty, French Hero, British Spy (hardback). New York: PublicAffairs. ISBN 978-1-5417-0066-6.
- Mackrell, Judith (2013). Flappers: Six Women of a Dangerous Generation. Pan Books. ISBN 978-0-330-52952-5.
- Mahon, Elizabeth Kerri (2011). Scandalous Women: The Lives and Loves of History's Most Notorious Women. Perigee Trade. ISBN 978-0-399-53645-8.
- Miller, Mark (2007). High Hat, Trumpet and Rhythm: The Life and Music of Valaida Snow. Toronto: The Mercury Press. ISBN 978-1-55128-127-8.
- Rose, Phyllis (1989). Jazz Cleopatra: Josephine Baker in her time. New York: Doubleday. ISBN 978-0-385-24891-4.
- Schroeder, Alan (1989). Ragtime Tumpie. Boston: Little, Brown. ISBN 9780316774970.
- Schroeder, Alan (1990). Josephine Baker. Chelsea House. ISBN 978-0-7910-1116-4.
- Theile, Merlind (October 2, 2009). "Adopting the World: Josephine Baker's Rainbow Tribe". Spiegel Online International. Archived from the original on October 4, 2009.
- Williams, Iain Cameron (2002). Underneath a Harlem Moon: The Harlem to Paris Years of Adelaide Hall. Bloomsbury Publishers. ISBN 978-0-8264-5893-3.
- Wood, Ean (2002). The Josephine Baker Story. Sanctuary Publishing. ISBN 978-1-86074-394-8.
