= Gérard Fayolle =

French politician (1937–2025)

Member of the French Senate for Dordogne
- In office 13 January 1997 – 30 September 1998
- Preceded by: Yves Guéna
- Succeeded by: Xavier Darcos

President of the General Council of Dordogne
- In office 1992–1994
- Preceded by: Bernard Bioulac
- Succeeded by: Bernard Cazeau

Mayor of Le Bugue
- In office 1983–2008
- Preceded by: Élie Leymonerie
- Succeeded by: Gérard Labrousse

Personal details
- Born: 11 October 1937; Le Bugue, France
- Died: 8 August 2025 (aged 87)
- Political party: RPR; UMP
- Occupation: Schoolteacher

Gérard Fayolle (French: [ʒeʁaʁ fajɔl]; 11 October 1937 – 8 August 2025) was a French politician of the Rally for the Republic (RPR) and the Union for a Popular Movement (UMP).

== Life and career ==
Born in Le Bugue on 11 October 1937, Fayolle taught at Laure-Gatet High School in Périgueux and subsequently worked for the Ministry of National Education and the Organisation internationale de la Francophonie.

Fayolle joined the RPR and was elected to the General Council of Dordogne in 1979, representing the Canton of Le Bugue. He was then mayor of Le Bugue in 1983. From 1992 to 1994, he was president of the General Council of Dordogne. On 13 January 1997, he replaced Yves Guéna in the Senate, who had been appointed to the Constitutional Council. He served in this role until 30 September 1998.

Fayolle died on 8 August 2025, at the age of 87.

== Decorations ==
- Knight of the Legion of Honour
- Officer of the Ordre national du Mérite
- Knight of the Ordre des Arts et des Lettres

== Works ==
- La Vie quotidienne en Périgord au temps de Jacquou le Croquant (1977)
- Histoire du Périgord (1983, 1984)
- La vie quotidienne des élus locaux sous la Ve République (1989)
- 50 ans de batailles politiques en Dordogne, 1945-1995 (1997)
- Le pays du Périgord noir (2000)
- La vallée de la Dordogne (2000)
- La vallée de la Vézère (2000)
- Les nouvelles ruralités - Les villages et la mondialisation (2001)
- Le monde des Causses, du Périgord aux Cévennes (2002)
- Le Périgord de Jacquou le croquant (2002)
- L'Aquitaine au temps de François Mauriac 1885-1970 (2004)
- L'Aquitaine au temps de François Mauriac 1885-1970 (2004)
- Le Bugue, trente ans d’histoire 1977-2007 (2007)
- Le clan des Ferral - un conte du Périgord (2009)
- Le Périgord des Trente Glorieuses 1945-1975 (2015)
- Le Bugue - Un village et ses historiens (2023)
