= Laure-Gatet High School =

High school in Périgueux, Dordogne, France

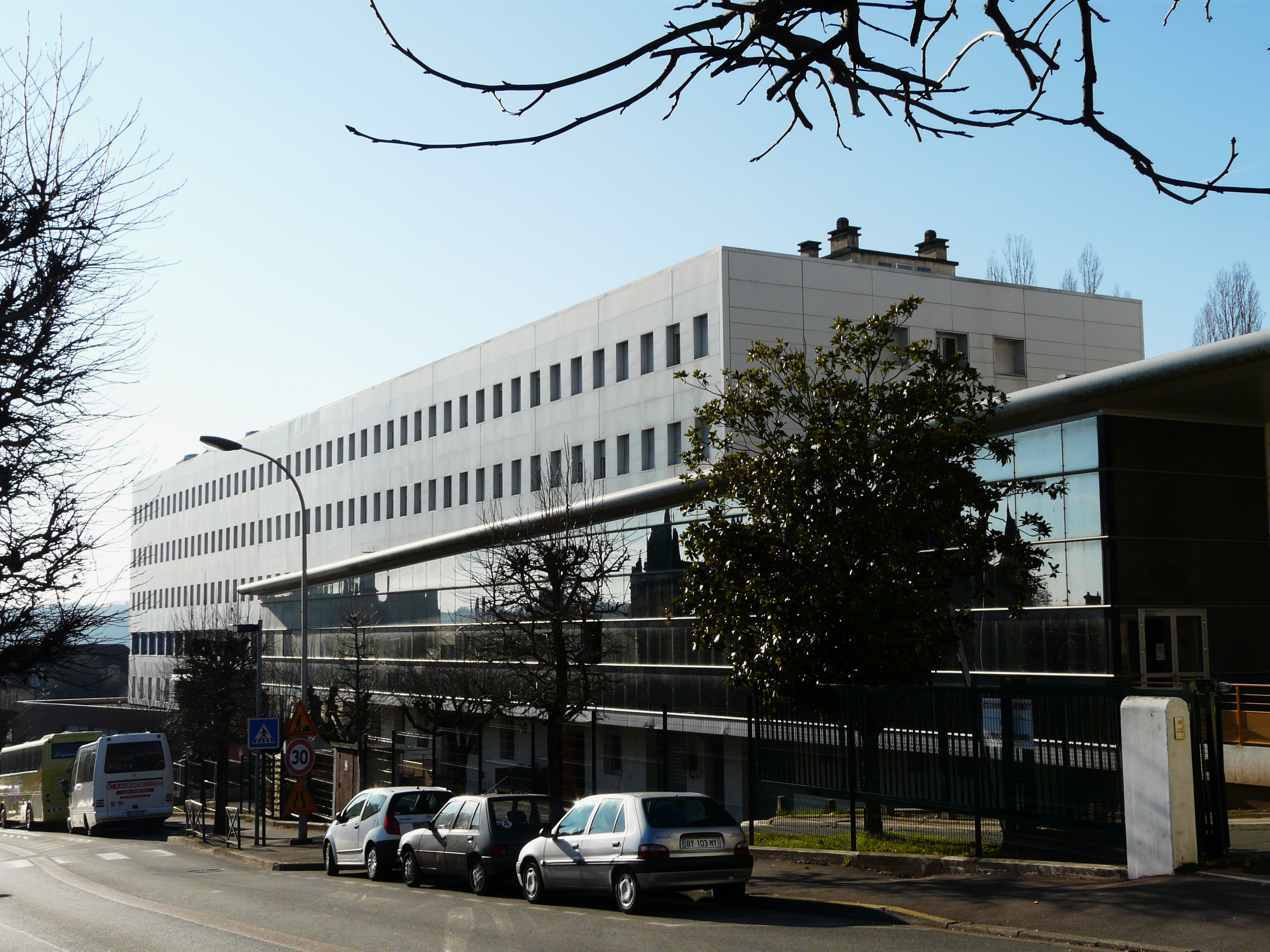
- Laure-Gatet High School in January 2012.

Location
- Périgueux, France; 45°11′23″N 0°43′25″E

Information
- School type: Local public educational establishment High school
- Founded: August 18, 1906
- Principal: Jean-Guillaume Desmoulin
- Teaching staff: 120 (2013)
- Enrollment: 919 (2014)
- Classes: Theatre, Portuguese, Chinese, Italian, Ancient Greek, Latin, football, optional sports (steps and badminton), fencing, martial arts, poetry, plastic arts
- Language: French, English, Spanish, German, Portuguese, Chinese, Italian, Ancient Greek, Latin
- Colors: Orange and green
- Slogan: « Apprendre pour connaître, connaître pour comprendre, comprendre pour choisir. » (Learn to know, know to understand, understand to choose)
- Website: www.lauregatet.fr

The Laure-Gatet High School (Lycée Laure-Gatet) is a French general and technological high school in Périgueux, in Dordogne.

Established in the city center on August 18, 1906, Laure-Gatet underwent a restructuring project that started in 2009 but faced delays, leading to a resumption in 2014. The high school achieved an 86% success rate in the baccalaureate in 2015. Recognized as a "Vocational school," Laure-Gatet provides a wide range of general and technological training programs, along with Higher Technician Certificates (BTS).

== Academic situation ==
The School is in Périgueux, within the educational district of the same name. It is one of the sixteen high schools in the Dordogne department, with ten of them being public institutions.

Laure-Gatet is a general and technological high school that has been awarded the "Vocational school" label by the Ministry of National Education. It is registered under number 0240025X and has the SIRET code 192 400 257 00015.

The high school has had a partnership with the Institute of Political Studies of Bordeaux since 2006. As a result, high school teachers provide training to voluntary candidates preparing for the entrance exam.

== History ==
=== Secondary education for girls and middle school ===
In 1867 Victor Duruy, minister of national education, established secondary education for girls in Périgueux with a program that commenced in January of the following year. However, this was discontinued shortly thereafter. (Note: p. 195.)

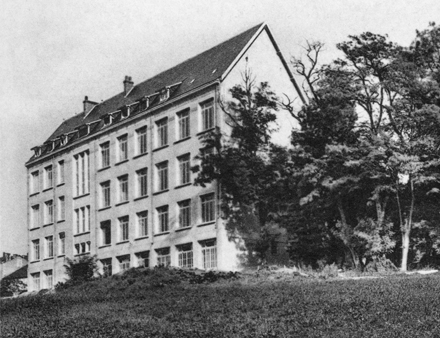
The girls' high school in the 1930s.

In 1879, an association of teachers from the high school for boys in Périgueux started offering secondary education courses for young girls. The location of the premises changed in 1883, 1885, and finally settled at 11 rue Ernest-Guillier in 1892. In 1901, the Departmental Council of Dordogne requested the official establishment of these lessons. The corresponding discussions initiated in 1904 concluded in a formal agreement on August 18, 1906, between the city and the Ministry of National Education and Fine Arts. This agreement led to the creation of the municipal middle school for young girls in Périgueux at the existing premises on rue Ernest-Guillier. The school was later relocated to the Bellussières area on the road to Paris (renamed Avenue de Paris in November 1906 (Note: p. 380.) and then Avenue Georges-Pompidou in July 1977), (Note: p. 236.) as approved by the municipality in its resolutions of December 1905 and June 1906. The land and buildings were acquired in two phases in July 1907; and the new middle school, including a boarding school, commenced operations during the Easter school holidays in 1908. (Note: pp. 289–290.) During this period, the teaching staff was predominantly female. In 1912, preparation for the baccalaureate was introduced alongside the traditional middle school classes, and the first two bachelorettes in "Latin-Languages" were awarded in 1913.

When France-Aimée Galandy took office as director in 1921, she found the school in disrepair. It was not until a few years later that the town hall of Périgueux renovated it. By 1925, the middle school had 85 boarders and 201-day students. In 1929, a school cooperative was established. A serious fire in late 1929 led to extensive renovations from 1931 to 1933, following architect Paul Cocula's plans, that included extending a wing to accommodate a future high school. However, the second phase of work was postponed due to insufficient funds.

=== From middle school to high school ===
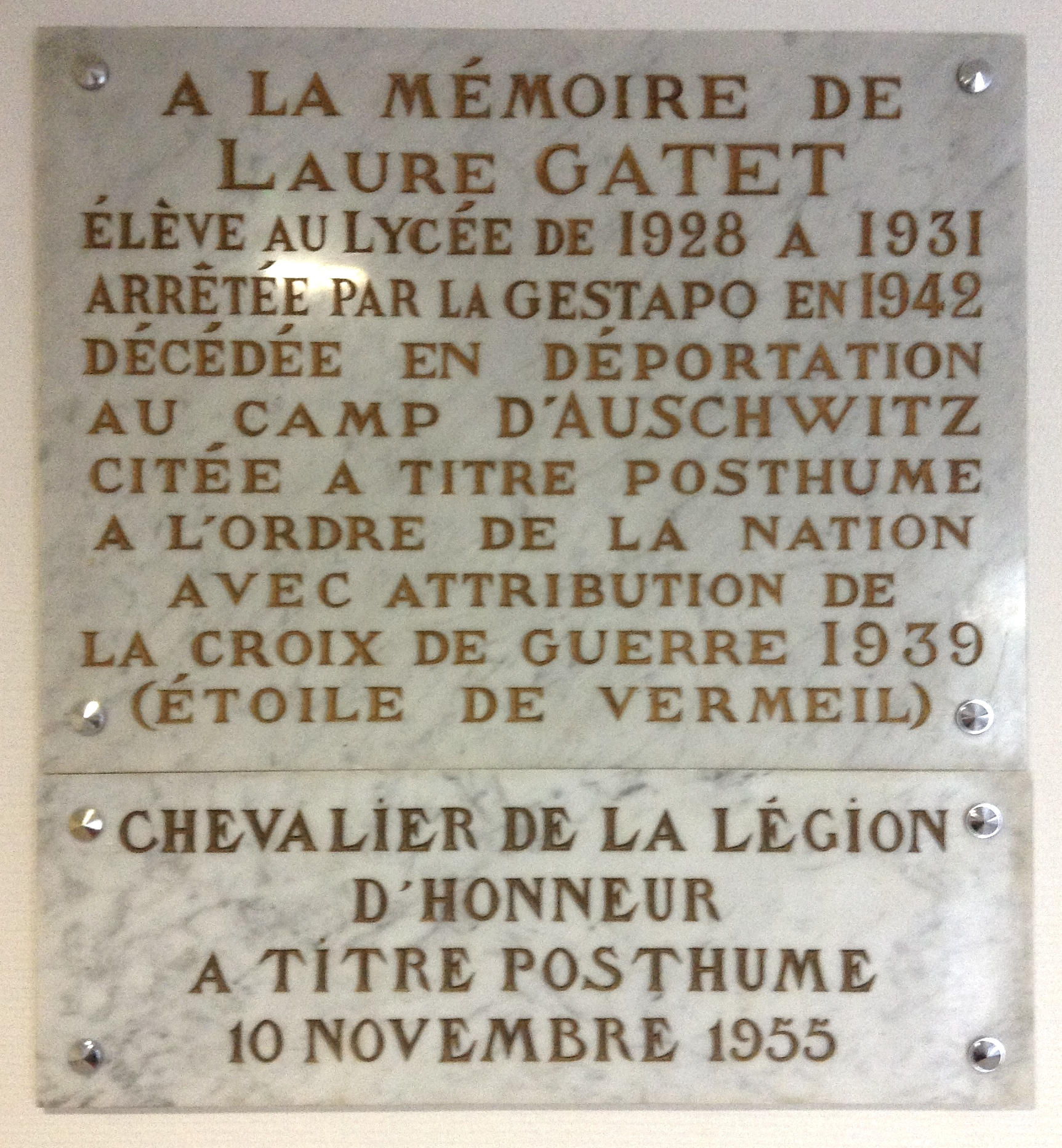
Plaque commemorating Laure Gatet, located in the High School of the same name.

On October 1, 1937 the establishment became a high school for girls in Périgueux.

During World War II, patronages were organized on the premises of the middle school for girls.

From June 1950 to November 1954 the high school underwent renovations and expansions based on the designs of a new architect, Mr. Legendre. The project included extending the wing constructed in 1933, adding conference rooms, study rooms, gymnasiums, music rooms, and dormitories. However, limited funding halted the construction until July, 1958.

On July 16, 1963 the municipal council of Périgueux proposed naming the establishment "Joseph-Joubert High School," after a local philosopher. However, conflicts arose with parents and the Alumni Association who advocated for "Laure-Gatet High School," in honor of a former student and resistance fighter who attended the school from 1928 to 1931. A plaque in the hall had already been dedicated to her memory since July 1947. In an attempt to reach an agreement, the academy inspector suggested naming the school after Joseph Joubert and dedicating a classroom to Laure Gatet. Nevertheless the school board strongly opposed and on January 19, 1967 it was decided the name of the school would be Laure-Gatet. Mayor Lucien Barrière of Périgueux reluctantly accepted this decision on February 8 of the same year, and the municipal council eventually approved it. By ministerial decree of June 11, 1969, the high school for girl in Périgueux was officially named Lycée Laure-Gatet.

In November 1972 a statue titled La matière et l'esprit (Matter and Spirit) was installed in the school's park. By the early 1980s, the high school had the highest number of employees among all high schools in the department, totaling 234 individuals.

In 1982 Xavier Darcos, a teacher at Laure-Gatet High School, was a member of the academic commission responsible for selecting topics for the baccalaureate exams. A few days before the exam, he provided his students with a subject similar to one of the proposed exam topics. As a result, the exam was canceled for all candidates in the city. Subsequently, the teacher was charged and summoned to appear before the Périgueux High Court on May 30, 1983. Xavier Darcos was acquitted and the court ruling that the choice of subject was uncertain.

=== Since the 2000s ===
On October 19, 2010 students from Laure-Gatet High School blocked the school entrance in protest against the 2010 pension reform. They had made this decision four days earlier at Gamenson Park in Périgueux.

From March 18 to April 28, 2013 an exhibition showcasing the history and life of the resistor Laure Gatet was held on the high school premises to commemorate the centenary of her birth. The exhibition was organized in partnership with the municipal library of Périgueux. The family of Laure Gatet, Mayor Michel Moyrand (Regional Council President Alain Rousset, Deputy Colette Langlade, and Academy Rector Jean-Louis Nembrini) officially inaugurated the exhibition on Friday, April 5.

Located right next to the finish line, the high school warmly welcomed the press and technical teams of the stage 20 of the 2014 Tour de France (individual time trial Bergerac-Périgueux) on July 26, 2014.

== Architecture of the school ==
Map of the Laure-Gatet school complex.

According to the academician Jean-Louis Galet, Laure-Gatet is considered a model of contemporary architecture from the 1970s.

The high school includes a boarding facility and has undergone extensive construction work as part of a multi-year investment program (PPI) managed by François Jolly, the head of works in high schools in Aquitaine, since 2009. The program involved the creation of a 450 m^{2} Documentation and Information Center (CDI) with annex rooms, thirty-three computers, (Note: Before the renovation, there were only seven computers. Martinez, Julie (March 8, 2011). "Une rentrée high tech au lycée Laure-Gatet de Périgueux". Sud Ouest (in French).) and a student lounge. Each floor of the renovated Building A is now color-coded, with the ground floor dedicated to BTS classes, the first floor to high school classes, and the top two levels to science courses and laboratories. The science rooms were upgraded during the February–March 2011 school holidays with new equipment such as roller shutters, interactive whiteboards, computers, and optical microscopes, costing 220,000 euros funded by the Aquitaine region. The rooms were also improved with better lighting and soundproofing; while the entrance was completely rebuilt, connecting the high school to a parvise created forecourt owned by the town hall of Périgueux, secured and delimited by barriers. According to Sud Ouest, the total cost of this restructuring was 9,600,000 euros, with a total of 13,300,000 euros spent on renovations since 1998, overseen by architect Paul Segura.

The final phase of restructuring began in 2015. In February 2016, Building B, the oldest of the three structures at the high school, was demolished to make way for a bridge with multiple walkways connecting buildings B and C. Both buildings underwent renovation, with architect Patricia Maitre overseeing the design and supervision of the work. Construction was finished in September 2017, costing 6.7 million euros, fully financed by the region.

== Enrollment ==
In 2014 the school had 919 students and 120 teachers (2013 figures).

Enrollment by class level in 2015
Level and section	Classes number	Student number
2nd GT	9	280
1st ES	2	52
1st L	2	64
1st S	3	82
1st STMG	1	33
3rd ES	2	58
3rd L	2	57
3rd S	3	81
3rd STMG	2	70
BTS CGO	2	65
BTS NRC	2	61
BTS Management of SMEs	2	65

Caption
GT: General and technological; ES: Economics and social sciences; L: Literature; S: Sciences; STMG: Science and Technology in Management; BTS: Higher Technician Certificates; CGO: Accounting and organizational management; NRC: Negotiations and customer relations

== Training ==
Laure-Gatet prepares students for general and technological baccalaureates. The second-year class offers exploration teachings and optional courses such as Literature and Society (LS), Creation and Artistic Activities (CAA), Scientific Methods and Practices (MPS), Fundamental Principles of Economics and Management (PFEG), Economic and Social Sciences (SES), and Science and Laboratory (SL). The high school is one of the eighteen European sections offering German in the Bordeaux Academy. In 2007, seven second and first-year students participated in the Franco-German program "Brigitte Sauzay."

Diploma prepared	Program title
General baccalaureate	Literature
General baccalaureate	Economics and social sciences
General baccalaureate	Sciences
Technological baccalaureate	Science and Technology in Management

The high school has the following three sections of Higher Technician Certificates (BTS):

Diplôme préparé	Intitulé de la formation
Higher Technician Certificates	Accounting and organizational management
Higher Technician Certificates	Negotiations and customer relations
Higher Technician Certificates	BTS Management of SMEs

== Administration ==
From Easter 1908 to the end of September 1921 the establishment was initially managed by Miss Aillien. In early October 1921, (Note: France-Aimée Galandy, also known as "Mademoiselle Galandy" (1882–1974), was appointed as the director of the girls' middle school in Périgueux by decree on July 20, 1921. (Charbonnel & Golfier 2013, p. 14).) the new principal was Miss France-Aimée Gallandy, who became principal on October 1, 1937, when the middle school became a high school. She remained in this position until September 1942. The subsequent principals were Mrs. Lesourd (October 1942 – September 1944), Miss Catherine André (October 1944 – September 1946), Mrs. Bjonson-Langen (October 1946 – September 1953), Mrs. Meteraud (October 1953 – September 1960), Mrs. Martin (September 1960 – September 1966), Mrs. Manceau (September 1966 – September 1976), and Mrs. Belleudy (September 1977 – September 1983). She was succeeded by the first male principal, Mr. Lacoste, who served until September 1986. Following him was Mr. Ferron until September 1996, when he was replaced by Mr. Constant.

The principals who have served since 2008 are Mr. Bertrand Cagniart (September 2008 – August 2013), and Mrs. Chantal Dauriac (September 2013 onwards).

In early 2015 the principal, Mrs. Dauriac, was assisted by Mrs. Mouret as the deputy principal, Mrs. Vételet as the accountant, and Mrs. Meyre as the manager. Later, Marie-Anne Sénéjoux served as the school principal from September 2018 to August 2021, and Jean-Guillaume Desmoulin succeeded her in 2021.

== Ranking and results ==
In 2014 L'Internaute reported that Laure-Gatet High School had a success rate of 85% in the 2013 baccalaureate exams, slightly below the national average of 90.1%. According to Le Figaro, the high school is ranked 3rd in Périgueux out of 9 schools, 63rd out of 68 at the academic level, and 1469th out of 1555 in the national ranking. By 2022, the baccalaureate success rate had improved to 93%.

Baccalaureate success rate, according to L'Internaute
Year	% success
2003	82
2004	78
2005	85
2006	82
2007	86
2008	92
2009	84
2010	86
2011	88
2012	82
2013	85
2014	89
2015	86
2016	87
2017	90
2018	93
2020	96
2021	
2022	94
2023	93

L Exams		ES Exams		S Exams		STMG Exams	
Year	% success	Year	% success	Year	% success	Year	% success
2007	88	2007	93	2007	90	—N/a	—N/a
2008	89	2008	91	2008	96	2008	90
2009	86	2009	89	2009	96	2009	78
2010	87	2010	81	2010	92	2010	81
2011	98	2011	91	2011	87	2011	80
2012	82	2012	94	2012	73	2012	83
2013	92	2013	91	2013	84	2013	75
2014	85	2014	92	2014	92	2014	87
2015	88	2015	93	2015	92	2015	69
2016	89	2016	91	2016	81	2016	87
2017	92	2017	83	2017	91	2017	94
2018	87	2018	96.6	2018	95.9	2018	89.8

== Optional subjects ==
At Laure-Gatet High School there is an optional theater program. In 2012, seventeen second-year students chose this option and participated annually in Didascalies. (Note: Didascalies is an annual week-long cultural event, gathering hundreds of high school students (300 in 2013) from the Aquitaine region and Corsica. Each high school presents its play to the other students. Prudhomme, Marie-Sylvie (February 14, 2013). Les Didascalies, 23ème édition du Festival lycéen (Audio) (in French). France Bleu. Archived from the original on April 27, 2015.)

Furthermore, students learn a variety of languages in addition to French, including English, Spanish, German, Portuguese, (Note: Portuguese classes started at Laure-Gatet High School in 1975. Bernard, Alain (June 30, 2011). "Les cours de portugais en sursis à Laure-Gatet". Sud Ouest (in French).) Mandarin, (Note: Mandarin classes started at Laure-Gatet High School in 2011. Bernard, Alain (March 18, 2011). "Le chinois au tableau". Sud Ouest (in French).) Italian, and the two classical languages commonly taught in France: Ancient Greek and Latin.

In March 2011 Laure-Gatet High School and Trélissac Football Club agreed to establish a football class with modified schedules for students starting the second year to provide continued education after middle school. In the first intake for the 2011 school year, twenty-three candidates applied, and sixteen were selected. The initiative is financially supported by the football club.

There is also an optional sports lessons (which includes steps and badminton). Additionally, there are lessons for fencing, martial arts, poetry, and plastic arts workshops.

== Culture ==
Laure-Gatet High School has a Maison des lycéens (Student Union House).

In 2010 the high school was used as a filming location for the movie Chaos, directed by Étienne Faure and released in 2013.

Every two years 20 students from the school, along with two teachers, participate in an exchange program with South Burlington High School (Vermont, US). As part of the program, they also visit New York City, while American students visit Paris. Additionally, the "South Burlington – Vermont – Périgueux" association was established on February 5, 2009 to support and facilitate ongoing exchanges between the two schools.

== Personalities associated with the school ==
- Former teachers
  - Gérard Fayolle (1937–)
  - Annie Herguido (1943–)
  - Xavier Darcos (1947–)
- Former students
  - Laure Gatet (1913–1943)
  - Florence Chevallier (1955–)
  - Éric Valmir (1968–)
  - Stéphane Jaubertie (1970–)
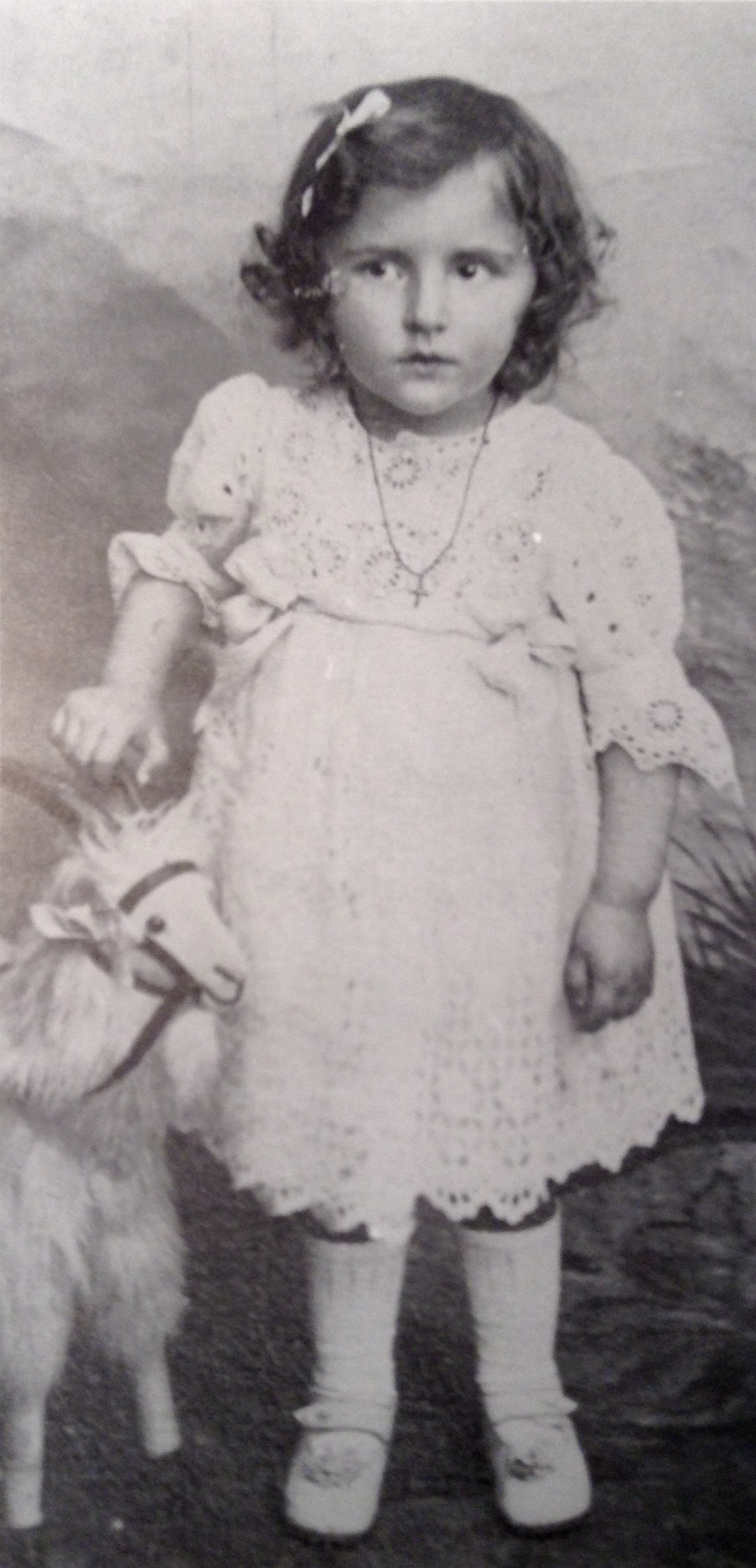
Laure Gatet in 1915.

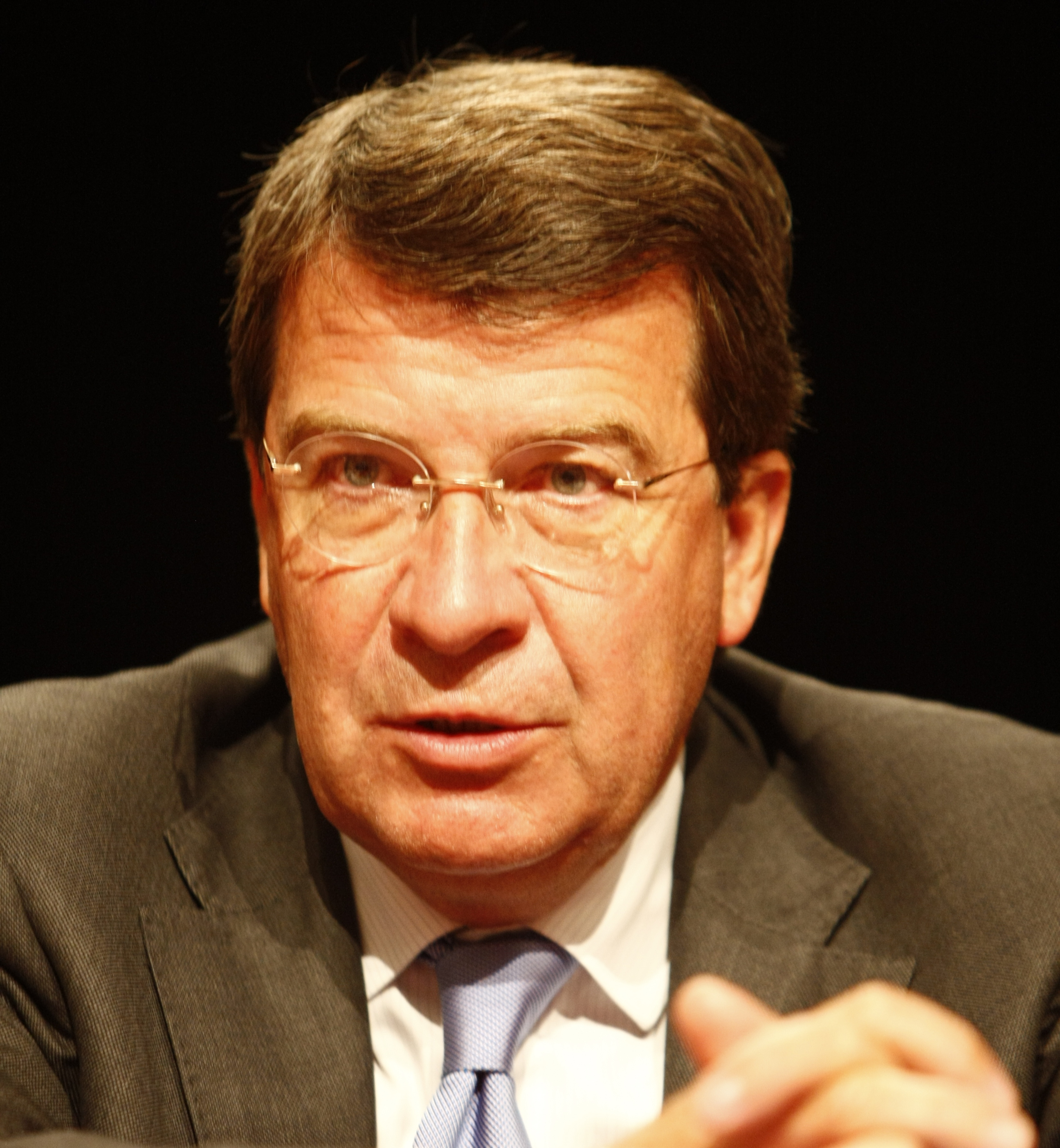
Xavier Darcos in 2008.

== Annexes ==
=== Bibliography ===
- Dugrip, Olivier (2013). Répertoire des établissements publics du second degré 2013/2014 (in French). Illustrated by Olivier Sauvaitre. Bordeaux: Académie de Bordeaux.
- Penaud, Guy (March 2003). Le grand livre de Périgueux (in French). Périgueux: Éditions de la Lauze. ISBN 2-912032-50-4.

== = External links ==
=

- "Official website" (in French).
- Organization resources: SIREN • SIRET
- Authority notes: VIAF • BnF • IdRef
- "Lycée Laure Gatet". Ministry of National Education website (in French).
