= Departmental Council of Dordogne =

Departmental legislature in France

Departmental Council of Dordogne Conseil départemental de la Dordogne
- Logo of the Council

Leadership
- President: Germinal Peiro, PS since 2 April 2015

Meeting place
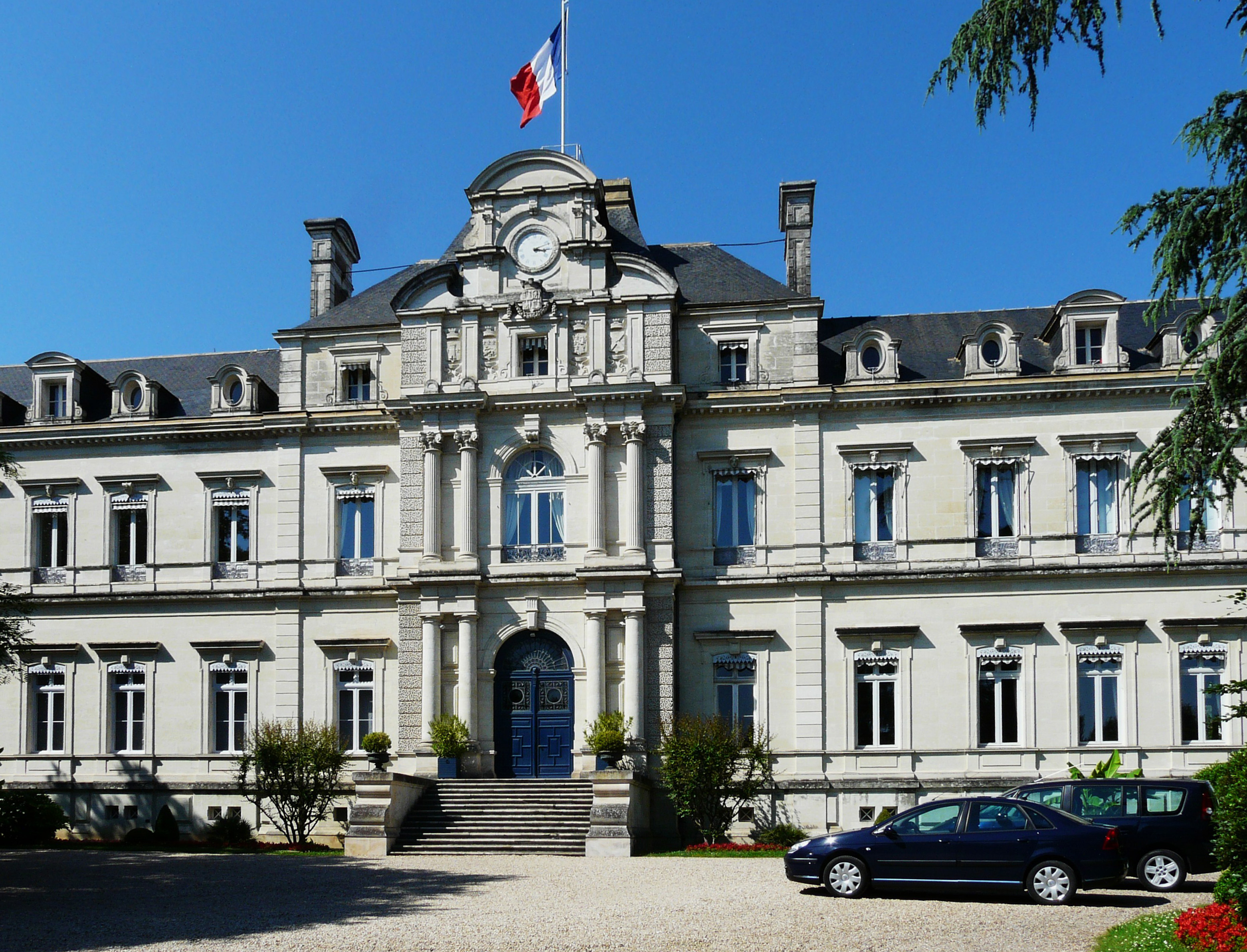
- Hôtel de préfecture de la Dordogne, Périgueux

Website
- www.dordogne.fr

Departmental Council of Dordogne (French: Conseil départemental de la Dordogne) is the deliberative assembly of the French department of Dordogne. It is headquartered in Périgueux. It includes 50 departmental councilors (25 women and 25 men) from the 25 cantons of Dordogne.

It is the co-founder, in partnership with the State and the Regional Council of Nouvelle-Aquitaine, of the Pôle d'Interprétation de la Préhistoire (PIP).

== Executive ==
=== Presidents ===
The president of the departmental council is Germinal Peiro (PS) since 2 April 2015.

List of successive presidents
Period		Name	Party
1928	1940	Léon Sireyjol	PRV
1945	1949	Édouard Dupuy	SFIO
1949	1979	Robert Lacoste	SFIO
1979	1982	Michel Manet	PS
1982	1992	Bernard Bioulac	PS
1992	1994	Gérard Fayolle	RPR
1994	2015	Bernard Cazeau	PS
2015	Incumbent	Germinal Peiro	PS

=== Vice-presidents ===
Alongside President Germinal Peiro, fifteen vice-presidents were also appointed.

List of vice-presidents of the departmental council (as of 2021)
Order	Name	Party	Canton (constituency)	Delegation
1st	Bruno Lamonerie	PS	Isle-Loue-Auvézère	General administration, finance, public order and budget
2nd	Christelle Druillole	PS	Trélissac	Youth and sports
3rd	Benoît Secrestat	PS	Sarlat-la-Canéda	Economic attractiveness and employment
4th	Sylvie Chevallier	PS	Sud-Bergeracois	Tourism and promotion of Périgord
5th	Didier Bazinet	PS	Ribérac	Agriculture, forestry and rural planning
6th	Marie-Lise Marsat	PS	Lalinde	People with disabilities
7th	Michel Lajugie	PS	Terrasson-Lavilledieu	Elderly people
8th	Mireille Volpato	PS	Périgueux-2	Children and families, integration, and social and solidarity economy
9th	Frédéric Delmarès	PS	Bergerac-2	Health and medical demography
10th	Régine Anglard	PS	Terrasson-Lavilledieu	Culture, language and Occitan culture
11th	Christian Teillac	PS	Vallée de l'Homme	Education
12th	Cécile Labarthe	PS	Bergerac-2	Territorial solidarity and local development
13th	Jean-Michel Magne	PS	Vallée de l'Isle	Roads and mobility
14th	Juliette Nevers	PS	Périgord Vert Nontronnais	Management of habitation
15th	Pascal Bourdeau	PS	Périgord Vert Nontronnais	Ecological transition

== Composition ==
Electoral map of Dordogne in the 2021 departmental elections

Distribution of seats (as of 2021)
Party	Acronym	Seats
Majority (34 seats)
Socialist Party	PS	25
Miscellaneous left	DVG	7
French Communist Party	PCF	2
Opposition (16 seats)
Miscellaneous right	DVD	7
The Republicans	LR	5
Sans étiquette	SE	4
