= Jacqueline Dubois =

French politician (born 1957)

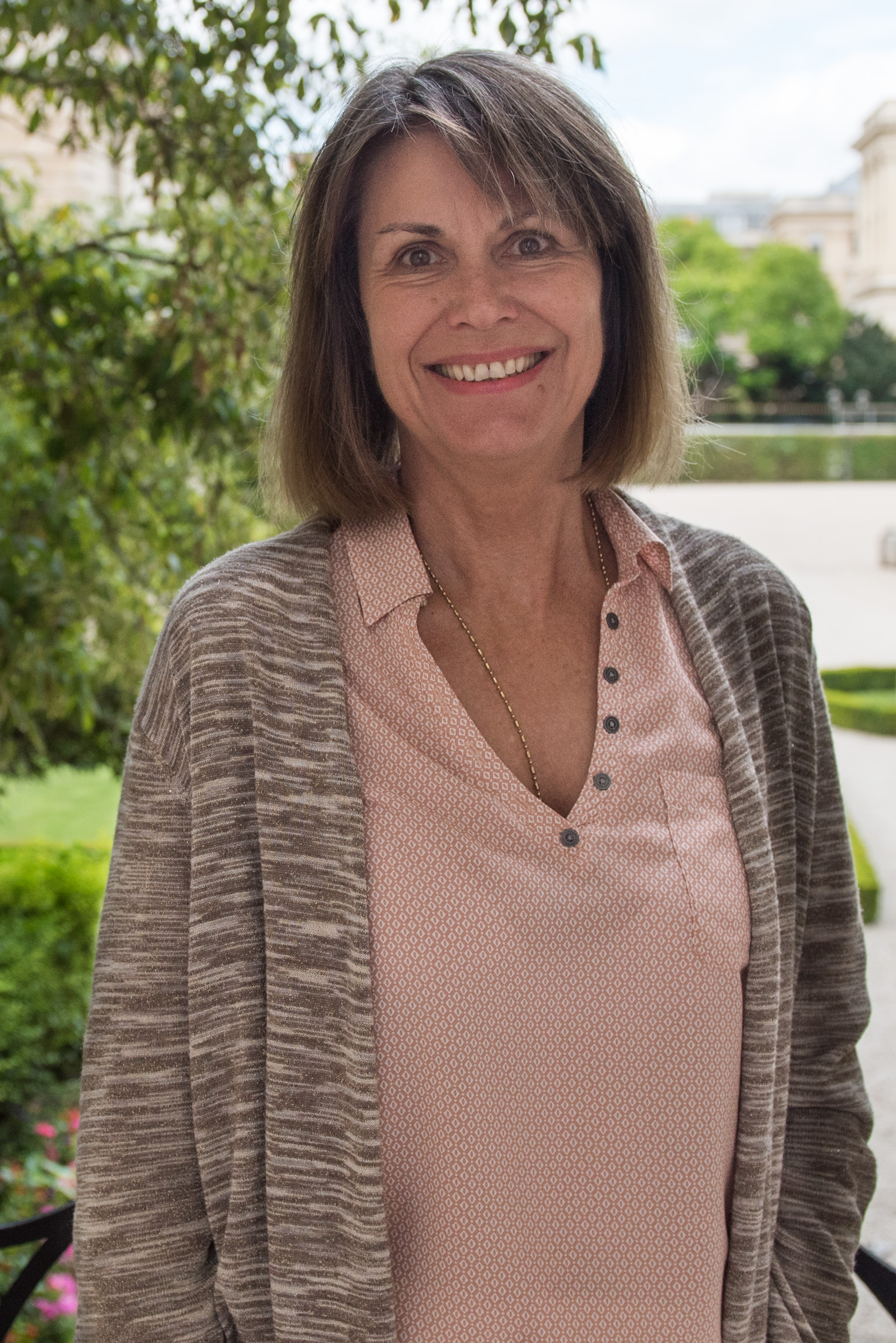
- Dubois in June 2017

Member of the National Assembly for Dordogne's 4th constituency
- In office 21 June 2017 – 21 June 2022
- Preceded by: Germinal Peiro
- Succeeded by: Sébastien Peytavie

Personal details
- Born: Jacqueline Sakwinski; 28 May 1957 (age 69) Fréjus, France
- Party: La République En Marche!

Jacqueline Dubois (French pronunciation: [ʒaklin dybwa]; née Sakwinski; born 28 May 1957) is a French politician of La République En Marche! (LREM) who represented the 4th constituency of the Dordogne department in the National Assembly from 2017 to 2022.

== Early life ==
Jacqueline Sakwinski was born in 1957 in Fréjus, France. Her mother was a housewife, while her father was a carpenter. She is of Polish origin through her Polish grandparents who moved to France after World War I.

She first entered politics in 2013, joining Nous Citoyens alongside her husband and afterwards Génération Citoyens. In 2014 she was on the list of candidates in the 2014 European Elections, and she ran again in 2015 in the 2015 French departmental elections in Sarlat as a substitute which she also list. By 2016, she had created the local movement in her area for Génération Citoyens.

== Career ==
In Parliament, Dubois served on the Committee on Cultural Affairs and Education. She was the president of a commission for an inquiry into the educational inclusion of disabled students, which led to a report in 2019 with various proposals for creating more inclusive schooling. In addition to her committee assignments, she was a member of the French-British Parliamentary Friendship Group and the French-Irish Parliamentary Friendship Group.

In January 2019, the cars of Dubois and her husband were set on fire outside their Dordogne residence after threats broadcast online from the yellow vests movement. In July 2019, Dubois voted in favor of the French ratification of the European Union’s Comprehensive Economic and Trade Agreement (CETA) with Canada.

She lost her seat in the 2022 French legislative election to Sébastien Peytavie of Génération.s.

== See also ==
- 2017 French legislative election
