= Dordogne's 4th constituency =

Constituency of the National Assembly of France

- Constituency for the National Assembly
- Boundary of Dordogne's 4th constituency in Dordogne

- Location of Dordogne within France
- Department: Dordogne
- Region: Nouvelle-Aquitaine
- Population: 113,211 (2013)
- Electorate: 87,718 (2017)

Current constituency
- Deputy: Sébastien Peytavie
- Political party: LE
- Parliamentary group: ECO

Dordogne's 4th constituency is one of four French legislative constituencies in the department of Dordogne. It is currently represented by Sébastien Peytavie of Génération.s (G.s).

== Historic representation ==
Legislature	Start of mandate	End of mandate	Deputy	Party
1st	9 December 1958	9 October 1962	Michel Diéras	DIV
2nd	6 December 1962	2 April 1967	Robert Lacoste	SFIO
3rd	3 April 1967	30 May 1968	Robert Lacoste	SFIO
4th	11 July 1968	1 April 1973	Pierre Janot	UDR
5th	2 April 1973	2 April 1978	Lucien Dutard	PCF
6th	3 April 1978	22 May 1981	Lucien Dutard	PCF
7th	2 July 1981	1 April 1986	Lucien Dutard	PCF
8th	2 April 1986	14 May 1988	Proportional representation	
9th	23 June 1988	28 July 1988	Roland Dumas	PS
9th	29 July 1988	1 April 1993	Paul Duvaleix	PS
10th	2 April 1993	18 June 1995	Jean-Jacques de Peretti	RPR
10th	19 June 1995	21 April 1997	Dominique Bousquet	RPR
11th	12 June 1997	18 June 2002	Germinal Peiro	PS
12th	19 June 2002	19 June 2007	Germinal Peiro	PS
13th	20 June 2007	19 June 2012	Germinal Peiro	PS
14th	20 June 2012	20 June 2017	Germinal Peiro	PS
15th	21 June 2017	21 June 2022	Jacqueline Dubois	LREM
16th	22 June 2022	9 June 2024	Sébastien Peytavie	G.s
17th	7 July 2024	ongoing	Sébastien Peytavie	LE

== Elections ==
=== 2024 ===
Candidate	Party	Alliance	First round			Second round		
Candidate	Party	Alliance	Votes	%	+/–	Votes	%	+/–
Dominique-Louise Marchaudon	RN		22,767	36.01	+18.42	27,184	45.36	new
Sébastien Peytavie	LÉ	NFP	21,801	34.49	+8.41	32,750	54.64	-0.84
Jérôme Peyrat	DIV		10,521	16.64	new			
Anne-Catherine Balland	LR		4,836	7.65	-4.80			
François Tourne	RE	ENS	1,904	3.01	new			
Nathalie Ballerand	REC		730	1.15	-1.93			
Christophe Green-Madeo	LO		657	1.04	+0.29			
Votes			63,216	100.00		59,934	100.00	
Valid votes			63,216	96.12	-1.10	59,934	90.66	+1.58
Blank votes			1,483	2.25	+0.59	4,215	6.38	-0.21
Null votes			1,071	1.63	+0.51	1,960	2.96	-1.38
Turnout			65,770	73.13	+16.97	66,109	73.49	+18.88
Abstentions			24,171	26.87	-16.97	23,842	26.51	-18.88
Registered voters			89,941			89,951		
Result						LE GAIN FROM G.s		

=== 2022 ===
Legislative Election 2022: Dordogne's 4th constituency
Party	Candidate	Votes	%	±%
G.s (NUPÉS)	Sébastien Peytavie	12,787	26.08	-4.08
LREM	Jacqueline Dubois*	9,958	20.31	N/A
RN	Ludivine Le Berre	8,624	17.59	+6.97
PS	Christian Teillac**	6,671	13.61	N/A
LR (UDC)	Basile Fanier	6,102	12.45	+0.58
REC	Anne-Laure Maleyre	1,511	3.08	N/A
REG	Stéphane Roudier	1,254	2.56	N/A
Others	N/A	2,114	4.31	
Turnout		49,021	56.16	−0.55
2nd round result
G.s (NUPÉS)	Sébastien Peytavie	24,233	55.48	+11.68
LREM	Jacqueline Dubois*	19,445	44.52	N/A
Turnout		43,678	54.61	+4.18
G.s gain from LREM				

* LREM dissident
** PS dissident

=== 2017 ===
Candidate	Label	First round		Second round	
Candidate	Label	Votes	%	Votes	%
Jacqueline Dubois	REM	14,955	30.92	21,990	56.20
Émilie Chalard	FI	6,388	13.21	17,136	43.80
Jérôme Peyrat	LR	5,743	11.87		
Florence Joubert	FN	5,138	10.62		
Benjamin Delrieux	PS	5,104	10.55		
Jean-Jacques de Peretti	DVD	3,342	6.91		
Nathalie Manet-Carbonnière	DVG	1,754	3.63		
Joëlle Montupet	PCF	1,605	3.32		
François Coq	ECO	1,488	3.08		
Stéphane Roudier	REG	978	2.02		
Thomas Michel	DVG	937	1.94		
Cécile Faucher	DIV	337	0.70		
Chrystelle Chambon	ECO	246	0.51		
Nécati Yildirim	EXG	185	0.38		
Marc Jutier	DVD	108	0.22		
Jean-Michel Toulouse	DVG	60	0.12		
Edwige Gorisse	UDI	0	0.00		
Votes		48,368	100.00	39,126	100.00
Valid votes		48,368	97.18	39,126	88.44
Blank votes		968	1.94	3,236	7.31
Null votes		437	0.88	1,877	4.24
Turnout		49,773	56.71	44,239	50.43
Abstentions		37,994	43.29	43,479	49.57
Registered voters		87,767		87,718	
Source: Ministry of the Interior

=== 2012 ===
Germinal Peiro obtained over 50% of the vote in the first round, with a vote that was more than 25% of the eligible voters in the constituency, so was elected in the first round.

2012 legislative election in Dordogne's 4th constituency
Candidate	Party	First round	
Candidate	Party	Votes	%
Germinal Peiro	PS	28,617	51.26%
Nathalie Fontaliran	UMP	13,365	23.94%
Emmanuelle Pujol	FN	5,975	10.70%
Catherine Dupuy	FG	4,403	7.89%
Jean-Paul Quentin	EELV	1,319	2.36%
Emmanuelle Fresne	??	589	1.06%
Edwige Gorisse	NC	470	0.84%
Michel Chretien	AEI	457	0.82%
Irène Leguay		380	0.68%
Serge Mercier	LO	251	0.45%
Valid votes		55,826	97.98%
Spoilt and null votes		1,149	2.02%
Votes cast / turnout		56,975	65.72%
Abstentions		29,712	34.28%
Registered voters		86,687	100.00%
