= Economic effects of Brexit =

The economic effects of Brexit were a major area of debate during and after the referendum on UK membership of the European Union. The majority of economists believe that Brexit has harmed the UK's economy and reduced its real per capita income in the long term, and the referendum itself damaged the economy. It is likely to produce a large decline in immigration from countries in the European Economic Area (EEA) to the UK, and poses challenges for British higher education and academic research.

== Immediate impact on the UK economy ==
=== Immediate impact of the referendum ===
According to one study, the referendum result had pushed up UK inflation by 1.7 percentage points in 2017, leading to an annual cost of £404 for the average British household. Studies published in 2018 estimated that the economic costs of the Brexit vote were 2% of GDP, or 2.5% of GDP. According to a December 2017 Financial Times analysis, the Brexit referendum results had reduced national British income by 0.6% and 1.3%. A 2018 analysis by Stanford University and Nottingham University economists estimated that uncertainty around Brexit reduced investment by businesses by approximately 6 percentage points and caused an employment reduction by 1.5 percentage points. A number of studies found that Brexit-induced uncertainty about the UK's future trade policy reduced British international trade from June 2016 onwards. A 2019 analysis found that British firms substantially increased offshoring to the European Union after the Brexit referendum, whereas European firms reduced new investments in the UK.

Short-term macroeconomic forecasts by the Bank of England and other banks of what would happen immediately after the Brexit referendum were too pessimistic. The assessments assumed that the referendum results would create greater uncertainty in markets and reduce consumer confidence more than it did. A number of economists noted that short-term macroeconomic forecasts are generally considered unreliable, as they are something that academic economists do not do, but rather banks do. Economists have compared short-term economic forecasts to weather forecasts whereas the long-term economic forecasts are akin to climate forecasts: the methodologies used in long-term forecasts are "well-established and robust".

=== Immediate impact of the end of the transition period ===
At the end of transition period, a trade agreement was enacted between the EU and the UK. Its implementation was rife with bureaucracy and uncertainty.

== Long-term impact on the UK economy ==
Many economists believe that leaving the European Union would adversely affect the British economy in the medium- and long-term. (Note: See:) Surveys of economists in 2016 showed overwhelming agreement that Brexit would likely reduce the UK's real per-capita income level. Surveys in 2017 and 2019 of existing academic research found that the credible estimates ranged between GDP losses of 1.2–4.5% for the UK, and a cost of between 1 and 10% of the UK's income per capita. These estimates varied depending on whether the UK left via a 'hard' or 'soft' Brexit. In January 2018, the UK government's own Brexit analysis was leaked; it showed that UK economic growth would be stunted by 2–8% for at least 15 years following Brexit, depending on the leave scenario. However, the doppelganger model much of this analysis has been based on has been challenged, as being fundamentally flawed. It has been suggested the model better tracks the impact of the Conservative-Liberal Democrat coalition government's austerity programme and its long term impacts than Brexit.

According to most economists, EU membership has a strong, positive effect on trade and, as a result, the UK's trade would be worse off when it left the EU. According to a study by University of Cambridge economists, under a hard Brexit, whereby the UK reverts to WTO rules, one-third of UK exports to the EU would be tariff-free, one-quarter would face high trade barriers and other exports risk tariffs in the range of 1–10%. A 2017 study found that "almost all UK regions are systematically more vulnerable to Brexit than regions in any other country." A 2017 study examining the economic impact of Brexit-induced reductions in migration found that there would likely be "a significant negative impact on UK GDP per capita (and GDP), with marginal positive impacts on wages in the low-skill service sector." It is unclear how changes in trade and foreign investment will interact with immigration, but these changes are likely to be important.

In October 2021, the UK government's Office of Budget Responsibility calculated that Brexit would cost 4% of GDP per annum over the long term. a 4% GDP hit could translate into a £32 billion cost per annum to the UK taxpayer. After rebates, the UK's EU membership fee in 2018 was £13.2 billion.

CIPS has reported think tank Campaign for European Reform's research, which found that UK goods trade was 11.2%, or £8.5 billion, lower in September 2021 than it would have been according to the Office for Budget Responsibility's forecast in March 2016.

A 2022 study from research firm Resolution Foundation found that Brexit had reduced the openness and competitiveness of the British economy.

On January 11, 2024, the London Mayor's Office released the "Mayor highlights Brexit damage to London economy". The release cites the independent report by Cambridge Econometrics that London has almost 300,000 fewer jobs, and nationwide two million fewer jobs as a direct consequence of Brexit. Brexit is recognized as a key contributor to the 2023 cost-of-living crisis with the average citizen being nearly £2,000 worse off, and the average Londoner nearly £3,400 worse off, in 2023 as a result of Brexit. In addition, UK real Gross Value Added was approximately £140bn less in 2023 than it would have been had the UK remained in the Single Market.

Economists and analysts at Cambridge Econometrics found that, by 2035, the UK is anticipated to have three million fewer jobs, 32% lower investment, 5% lower exports and 16% lower imports, than it would have had been. The report states that the UK will be £311bn worse off by 2035 due to leaving the EU.

A 2024 study by Alabrese et al finds that the vast majority of UK regions experienced significant output losses as a result of Brexit, estimated at 5–10 percentage points of GDP relative to synthetic counterfactuals. The paper concludes that while Brexit reduced regional inequalities, it did so by “levelling up through levelling down,” meaning that previously more prosperous regions, such as London and the Midlands, were disproportionately hit, resulting in a poorer UK overall.

Based on 2025/2026 Bloomberg Economics research, Brexit has caused a significant, persistent, and worsening drag on the UK economy, costing an estimated £100 billion to over £200 billion annually. For instance, a 2025 working paper estimated that by 2025 Brexit had reduced UK GDP by 6% to 8%, using macro data and micro estimates from the Decision Maker Panel survey.Bloom, Nicholas; Dhingra, Swati; Van Reenen, John (April 2024). "The Economic Impact of Brexit". NBER Working Paper Series. 32345. This estimate was cited in an October 2025 Bank of England speech, which also noted declines in investment, employment, and productivity due to the Brexit process.Dhingra, Swati (October 2025). Tariffed with the same brush: confronting today’s challenges to trade (Speech). Bank of England. Overall, recent studies suggest the long-term, per-person damage to GDP is roughly 6% to 8%, roughly double the 4% hit initially estimated by the Office for Budget Responsibility.

== The "divorce bill" ==
Since fiscal impacts will play a major role in the outcome of Brexit, former prime minister Theresa May stated that money would be taking first place as the key importance surrounding Brexit, the others being borders and laws. The Brexit divorce bill was essentially a financial settlement in which the United Kingdom must pay off their liabilities to the EU. This includes, for example, unpaid contributions to the EU's multi-year finances. There is no current set figure for the bill but estimates have shown it to be at least £39 billion. First year costs (2018–2019) were expected to be close to £14 billion and decreasing to £7 billion by 2022–2023.

== Movement of companies ==
Following the Brexit referendum, many companies shifted assets, offices, or businesses operations out of Britain and to continental Europe and Ireland. By the beginning of April 2019, banks had transferred more than US$1 trillion out of Britain, and asset management and insurance companies transferred US$130 billion out of Britain.

A March 2019 report from the independent research institute New Financial identified 269 companies in the banking or financial services sector that had relocated portions of their businesses or staff following Brexit; of these moves, 239 were confirmed as Brexit-related. The greatest number of moves were to Dublin (30%), followed by Luxembourg (18%), Frankfurt (12%), Paris (12%), and Amsterdam (10%).

== Contributions to the EU ==
Supporters of withdrawal argued that ending net contributions to the EU would allow for tax cuts or government spending increases. On the basis of Treasury figures, in 2014 the United Kingdom's gross national contribution (ignoring the rebate) was £18.8 billion, about 1% of GDP, or £350 million a week. Because the UK receives (per capita) less EU spending than other member states, a rebate was negotiated; net of this rebate, the contribution was £14.4 billion, approximately 0.8% of GDP, or £275 million a week. If EU spending in Britain is also taken into account, the average net contribution for the next five years is estimated at about £8 billion a year, which is about 0.4% of national income, or £150 million per week. The Institute for Fiscal Studies have said that the majority of forecasts of the impact of Brexit on the UK economy indicated that the government would have less money to spend even if it no longer had to pay into the EU.

== Single market ==
According to economist Paul Krugman, Brexit supporters' assertions that leaving the single market and customs union might increase UK exports to the rest of the world are wrong. He considers the costs of Brexit might be around 2 percent of GDP.

== Foreign direct investment ==
European experts from the World Pensions Council (WPC) and the University of Bath have argued that, beyond short-lived market volatility, the long-term economic prospects of Britain remain high, notably in terms of country attractiveness and foreign direct investment (FDI): "Country risk experts we spoke to are confident the UK's economy will remain robust in the event of an exit from the EU. 'The economic attractiveness of Britain will not go down and a trade war with London is in no one's interest,' says M Nicolas Firzli, director-general of the World Pensions Council (WPC) and advisory board member for the World Bank Global Infrastructure Facility [...] Bruce Morley, lecturer in economics at the University of Bath, goes further to suggest that the long-term benefits to the UK of leaving the Union, such as less regulation and more control over Britain's trade policy, could outweigh the short-term uncertainty observed in the [country risk] scores."

The mooted importance of the UK's membership of the EU as a lure for FDI has long been stressed by supporters of the UK's continued involvement in the EU. In this view, foreign firms see the UK as a gateway to other EU markets, with the UK economy benefiting from its resulting attractiveness as a location for activity. The UK is certainly a major recipient of FDI. In 2014, it held the second largest stock of inward investment in the world, amounting to just over £1 trillion or almost 7% of the global total. This was more than double the 3% accounted for by Germany and France. On a per capita basis, the UK is the clear front-runner among major economies with a stock of FDI around three times larger than the level in other major European economies and 50% larger than in the US.

== Property market ==
The BBC reported on 28 April 2017 that property investment firm JLL data shows Asian investors accounted for 28% of the transactions in the UK property market in 2016, up from the 17% the year before – indicating that Brexit is not dissuading Asian property investors. The BBC also cited Chinese international property portal Juwai.com, which reported a 60% increase in enquiries into UK property in the prior 12 months. Property firm CBRE Group said in January 2017 that Brexit has increased risk in UK property markets by creating new uncertainties.

== Roaming ==
With Brexit, EU law is no longer applicable in the UK. This means British mobile network operators — like EE Limited — will be free to charge users for roaming service.

== Stock markets and currencies ==
When the London Stock Exchange opened on Friday 24 June 2016, the FTSE 100 fell from 6338.10 to 5806.13 in the first ten minutes of trading. It recovered to 6091.27 after a further 90 minutes before further recovering to 6162.97 by the end of the day's trading. This equated to a fall of 3% by the close of trading. When the markets reopened the following Monday, the FTSE 100 showed a steady decline, losing over 2% by mid-afternoon. Upon opening later on the Friday after the referendum, the US Dow Jones Industrial Average dropped nearly 450 points or about 2.5% in less than half an hour. The Associated Press called the sudden worldwide stock market decline a stock market crash. Internationally, more than US$2 trillion of wealth in equities markets was wiped out in the highest one-day sell-off in recorded history, in absolute terms. The stock market losses amounted to a total of 3 trillion US dollars by 27 June; up to the same date, the FTSE 100 index had lost £85 billion. Near the close of trading on 27 June, the domestically-focused FTSE 250 Index was down approximately 14% compared to the day before the referendum results were published.

However, by 1 July the FTSE 100 had risen above pre-referendum levels, to a ten-month high. Taking the previous fall into account, this represented the index's largest single-week rise since 2011. On 11 July, it officially entered growing market territory, having risen by more than 20% from its February low. The FTSE 250 moved above its pre-referendum level on 27 July. In the US, the S&P 500, a broader market than the Dow Jones, reached an all-time high on 11 July.

On the morning of 24 June, the pound sterling fell to its lowest level against the US dollar since 1985, marking the pound down 10% against the US dollar and 7% against the euro. The drop from $1.50 to $1.37 was the biggest move for the currency in any two-hour period in history. The pound remained low, and on 8 July became the worst performing currency of the year, against 31 other major currencies, performing worse than the Argentine peso, the previous lowest currency. By contrast, the pound's trade-weighted index is only back at levels seen in the period 2008–2013.

The referendum result also had an immediate economic effect on a number of other countries. The South African rand experienced its largest single-day decline since 2008, dropping in value by over 8% against the US dollar. Other countries negatively affected included Canada, whose stock exchange fell 1.70%, Nigeria, and Kenya. This was partly due to a general global financial shift out of currencies seen as risky and into the US dollar, and partly due to concerns over how the UK's withdrawal from the EU would affect the economies and trade relations of countries with close economic links to the United Kingdom.

On 5 January 2017, Andy Haldane, the Chief Economist and the Executive Director of Monetary Analysis and Statistics at the Bank of England, admitted that forecasts predicting an economic downturn due to the referendum have so far been inaccurate and noted strong market performance since the referendum.

In January 2021, Euronext became Europe's largest stock market, as London lost its dominance for the first time since 1986.

== Economy and business ==
On 27 June 2016, Chancellor of the Exchequer George Osborne attempted to reassure financial markets that the UK economy was not in serious trouble. This came after media reports that a survey by the Institute of Directors suggested that two-thirds of businesses believed that the outcome of the referendum would produce negative results as well as falls in the value of sterling and the FTSE 100. Some British businesses had also predicted that investment cuts, hiring freezes and redundancies would be necessary to cope with the results of the referendum. Osborne indicated that Britain was facing the future "from a position of strength" and there was no current need for an emergency Budget. "No-one should doubt our resolve to maintain the fiscal stability we have delivered for this country .... And to companies, large and small, I would say this: the British economy is fundamentally strong, highly competitive and we are open for business."

On 14 July 2016 Philip Hammond, Osborne's successor as Chancellor, told BBC News the referendum result had caused uncertainty for businesses, and that it was important to send "signals of reassurance" to encourage investment and spending. He also confirmed there would not be an emergency budget: "We will want to work closely with the governor of the Bank of England and others through the summer to prepare for the Autumn Statement, when we will signal and set out the plans for the economy going forward in what are very different circumstances that we now face, and then those plans will be implemented in the Budget in the spring in the usual way."

It was expected that the weaker pound would also benefit aerospace and defence firms, pharmaceutical companies, and professional services companies; the share prices of these companies were boosted after the EU referendum.

On 12 July 2016, the global investment management company BlackRock predicted the UK would experience a recession in late 2016 or early 2017 as a result of the vote to leave the EU, and that economic growth would slow down for at least five years because of a reduction in investment. On 18 July, the UK-based economic forecasting group EY ITEM club suggested the country would experience a "short shallow recession" as the economy suffered "severe confidence effects on spending and business"; it also cut its economic growth forecasts for the UK from 2.6% to 0.4% in 2017, and 2.4% to 1.4% for 2018. The group's chief economic adviser, Peter Soencer, also argued there would be more long-term implications, and that the UK "may have to adjust to a permanent reduction in the size of the economy, compared to the trend that seemed possible prior to the vote". Senior City investor Richard Buxton also argued there would be a "mild recession". On 19 July, the International Monetary Fund (IMF) reduced its 2017 economic growth forecast for the UK from 2.2% to 1.3%, but still expected Britain to be the second fastest growing economy in the G7 during 2016; the IMF also reduced its forecasts for world economic growth by 0.1% to 3.1% in 2016 and 3.4% in 2017, as a result of the referendum, which it said had "thrown a spanner in the works" of global recovery.

On 20 July 2016, a report released by the Bank of England said that although uncertainty had risen "markedly" since the referendum, it was yet to see evidence of a sharp economic decline as a consequence. However, around a third of contacts surveyed for the report expected there to be "some negative impact" over the following year.

In September 2016, following three months of positive economic data after the referendum, commentators suggested that many of the negative statements and predictions promoted from within the "remain" camp had failed to materialise, but by December, analysis began to show that Brexit was having an effect on inflation.

Research by the Centre for European Reform suggests the UK economy is 2.5% smaller than it would have been if Remain had won the referendum. Public finances fell by £26 billion a year. This amounts to £500 million a week and is growing. An estimate suggested Britain's economy is 2.1% smaller than it would have been after the first quarter of 2018. On 23 September 2022, the day of the Truss-Kwarteng mini-budget, Mark Carney summarised the impact of Brexit as follows: "in 2016 the British economy was 90 per cent the size of Germany's. Now it is less than 70 per cent. And that calculation was made before today."

Toyota announced plans for a one-day production pause at its Burnaston factory on 1 November 2019. The car maker cited uncertainty about the actual supply situation on "the first day of Brexit".

=== Imports and exports ===
While import and export looks like increasing in France, French customs considered this masks the "hub effect". Before the Brexit, British products transiting by France and sold in a third EU country were remaining within the EU and were considered an internal import of this third country. After Brexit, those exact same non-EU British products are now considered as imported into the European Union, with France as entry point, making them registered in French import statistics.

In 2024, French customs considered Brexit, in the meantime, has reduced trade between the UK and the EU, but increased trade between China and the United Kingdom: Imports from the EU to the UK have dropped from 52% to 40%, while imports from China and the United-States have increased from 9% to 13% and from 9% to 12% respectively.

== Freight traffic ==
By 2023 there has been a considerable increase of freight shipping which by-passes the Dover-Calais route. The southeast Irish port of Rosslare and the French port of Cherbourg have expanded their capacities to enable direct shipping to and from the European mainland, according to reporting in The Guardian.

== Financial institutions ==
On the day after the referendum, Bank of England Governor Mark Carney told a press conference:

The capital requirements of our largest banks are now 10 times higher than before the financial crisis. The Bank of England has stress-tested those banks against scenarios far more severe than our country currently faces. As a result of these actions UK banks have raised over £130bn of new capital and now have more than £600bn of high quality liquid assets. That substantial capital and huge liquidity gives banks the flexibility they need to continue to lend to UK businesses and households even during challenging times.
Moreover, as a backstop to support the functioning of the markets the Bank of England stands ready to provide more than £250bn of additional funds through its normal market operations. The Bank of England is also able to provide substantial liquidity in foreign currency if required. We expect institutions to draw on this funding if and when appropriate.
It will take some time for the UK to establish a new relationship with Europe and the rest of the world. So some market and economic volatility can be expected as this process unfolds, but we are well prepared for this. Her Majesty's Treasury and the Bank of England have engaged in extensive contingency planning and the chancellor and I have remained in close contact including through the night and this morning. The Bank of England will not hesitate to take additional measure as required, as markets adjust.

Nonetheless, share prices of the five largest British banks fell an average of 21% on the morning after the referendum. Shares in many other non-UK banks also fell by more than 10%. By the end of Friday's trading, both HSBC and Standard Chartered had fully recovered, while Lloyds, RBS Group and Barclays remained more than 10% down. All of the Big Three credit rating agencies reacted negatively to the vote: Standard & Poor's cut the UK credit rating from AAA to AA, Fitch Group cut from AA+ to AA, and Moody's cut the UK's outlook to "negative".

To increase financial stability, on 5 July the Bank of England released £150 billion in lending by reducing the countercyclical capital buffers that banks are required to hold.

Fears of a fall in commercial property values led investors to begin redeeming investments in property funds, prompting Standard Life to bar withdrawals on 4 July, and Aviva followed suit the next day. Other investment companies including Henderson Group and M&G Investments cut the amount that investors cashing in their funds would receive. In the following weeks, the suspension of redemptions by several companies was lifted, replaced by exit penalties, and the exit penalties were successively reduced.

On 4 October 2016, the Financial Times assessed the potential effect of Brexit on banking. The City of London is world leading in financial services, especially in foreign exchange currency transactions, including euros. This position is enabled by the EU-wide "passporting" agreement for financial products. Should the passporting agreement expire in the event of a Brexit, the British financial service industry might lose up to 35,000 of its 1 million jobs, and the Treasury might lose 5 billion pounds annually in tax revenue. Indirect effects could increase these numbers to 71,000 job losses and 10 billion pounds of tax annually. The latter would correspond to about 2% of annual British tax revenue.

By July 2016 the Senate of Berlin had sent invitation letters encouraging UK-based start-ups to re-locate to Berlin. According to Anthony Browne of the British Banking Association, many major and minor banks may relocate outside the UK.

Economists have warned that London's future as an international financial centre depends on whether the UK will obtain passporting rights for British banks from the European Union. If banks located in the UK cannot obtain passporting rights, they have strong incentives to relocate to financial centres within the EU. According to John Armour, Professor of Law and Finance at Oxford University, "a 'soft' Brexit, whereby the UK leaves the EU but remains in the single market, would be a lower-risk option for the British financial industry than other Brexit options, because it would enable financial services firms to continue to rely on regulatory passporting rights."

=== Asset management companies ===
But the situation may be different when it comes to the fund management industry, as British asset owners, notably UK pension funds, often constitute an incommensurate share of total turnover for German, French, Dutch and other Continental European asset managers.

This imbalance could potentially give Britain some negotiating leverage e.g. power of retorsion in case the EU attempts to impose an abrupt cancellation of the mutually-binding obligations and advantages pertaining to the Markets in Financial Instruments Directive 2004 ("fund passporting"). Research conducted by the World Pensions Council (WPC) shows that

"Assets owned by UK pension funds are more than 11 times bigger than those of all German and French pension funds put together […] If need be, at the first hint of threat to the City of London, Her Majesty's Government should be in a position to respond very forcefully."

== International Monetary Fund ==
In July 2016, the IMF released a report warning that "'Brexit' marks the materialisation of an important downside risk to global growth", and that considering the current uncertainty as to how the UK would leave the EU, there was "still very much unfolding, more negative outcomes are a distinct possibility". In September 2018 the IMF stated that Brexit would probably, "entail costs", but a disorderly leaving could result in, "a significantly worse outcome". Christine Lagarde said, "Any deal will not be as good as the smooth process under which goods, services, people and capital move around between the EU and the UK without impediments and obstacles. Our projections assume a timely agreement with the EU on a broad free-trade pact and a relatively smooth Brexit process after that. A more disruptive departure will have a much worse outcome. Let me be clear: compared with today's smooth single market, all the likely Brexit scenarios will have costs for the UK economy, and to a lesser extent for the EU as well. The larger the impediments to trade in the new relationship, the costlier it will be." Lagarde also said a "disorderly" or "crash" Brexit would have many results, including cuts to growth, a worsened deficit and depreciation of sterling, causing the size of the UK economy to be reduced. Lagarde was asked if she predicted any positives from Brexit, Lagarde said, "I see a lot of negatives. If all the uncertainties were removed it would be better. It is bad for the economy to have this amount of uncertainty."

== G20 finance ministers ==
Held in late July 2016 in Chengdu, China this summit of finance ministers of 20 major economies warned that the UK's planned departure from the European Union was adding to uncertainty in the global economy and urged that the UK should remain close to the European Union to reduce turmoil. While the G20 agreed that other world factors, including terrorist acts, were creating problems, Brexit was at the forefront of their concerns.

In interviews while attending the G20 Summit, Philip Hammond, the UK's recently appointed Chancellor of the Exchequer, said the country would attempt to minimise uncertainty by explaining in the near future "more clearly the kind of arrangement we envisage going forward with the European Union". He emphasised that "the uncertainty will only end when the deal is done" but hoped that the UK and the EU would be able to announce some agreement by late 2016 as to how the exit would be staged. Hammond also reiterated previous Government comments indicating that steps would be taken to stimulate the economy including tax cuts or increased spending, though without specifics. The UK was also planning to increase bilateral trade with China, he told the BBC. According to Hammond, "Once we are out of the European Union then I have no doubt on both sides we will want to cement that relationship into a firmer structure in a bilateral way that's appropriate."

Although he was not addressing only the UK's departure from the EU, Mark Carney, chair of the Financial Stability Board (and Governor of the Bank of England), sent a letter in late July 2016 to Finance Ministers attending the G20 Summit and to Central Bank Governors about the difficulties the global economy had weathered (including the effects of Brexit) and the steps the FSB was taking. The letter indicated that the financial system had "continued to function effectively" in spite of the "spikes in uncertainty and risk aversion", confirming that "this resilience in the face of stress demonstrates the enduring benefits of G20 post-crisis reforms." He emphasised the value of specific reforms that had been implemented by the Financial Stability Board stating that these had "dampened aftershocks from these events [world crises] rather than amplifying them". He expressed confidence in the FSB's strategies as follows: "This resilience in the face of stress demonstrates the enduring benefits of G20 post-crisis reforms."
