= Baccalauréat =

French secondary education diploma

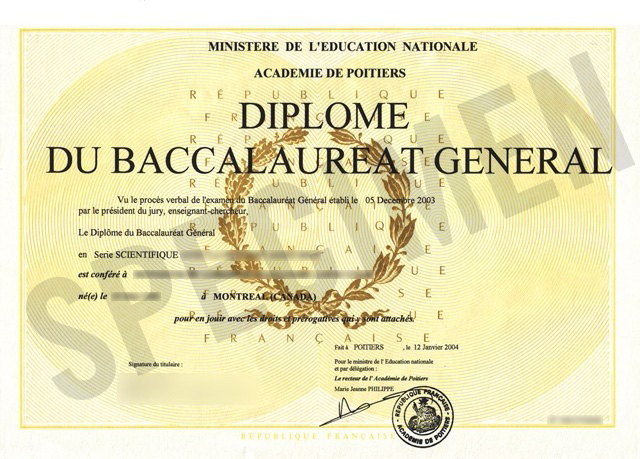
A diploma of baccalauréat général; it is issued by the recteur d'académie by delegation from the Minister of National Education.

The baccalauréat (French pronunciation: [bakaloʁea]; lit. 'baccalaureate'), often known in France colloquially as the bac, is a French national academic qualification that students can obtain at the completion of their secondary education (at the end of the lycée) by meeting certain requirements. Though it has only existed in its present form as a school-leaving examination since Emperor Napoleon Bonaparte's implementation on 17 March 1808, its origins date back to the first medieval French universities. According to French law, the baccalaureate is the first academic degree, though it grants the completion of secondary education. Historically, the baccalaureate is administratively supervised by full professors at universities.

Similar academic qualifications exist elsewhere in Europe, variously known as Abitur in Germany, maturità in Italy, bachillerato in Spain, maturita in Slovakia and Czech Republic. There is also the European Baccalaureate, which students take at the end of the European School education.

In France, there are three main types of baccalauréat, which are very different and obtained in different places: the baccalauréat général (general baccalaureate), the baccalauréat technologique (technological baccalaureate), and the baccalauréat professionnel (professional baccalaureate).

== Overview ==
Much like the European Matura, English A levels, or the North American high school diploma, the baccalauréat allows French and international students to obtain a standardised qualification, typically at the age of 18 (end of the lycée). It qualifies holders to work in certain areas, go on to tertiary education (universités), or acquire some other professional qualification or training. Even though it is not legally required, the vast majority of students in their final year of secondary school take a final exam.

The word bac is also used to refer to one of the end-of-year exams that students must pass to get their baccalauréat diploma: the bac de philo, for example, is the philosophy exam, which all students must take, regardless of their field of study.

Within France, there are three main types of baccalauréat obtained in different places, and which are completely different:

- the baccalauréat général (general baccalaureate), specially made to enter university and continue studies;
- the baccalauréat technologique (technological baccalaureate), specially made to work or continue short technical studies;
- the baccalauréat professionnel (professional baccalaureate), specially made to enter professional life.

For entrance to regular universities within France, however, there are some restrictions as to the type of baccalauréat that can be presented. In some cases, it may be possible to enter a French university without the bac by taking a special exam, the "diploma for entrance to higher education".

Though most students take the bac at the end of secondary school, it is also possible to enter as a candidat libre (literally, "free candidate") without affiliation to a school. Students who did not take the bac upon completion of secondary school (or did not manage to pass it) and would like to attend university, or feel that the bac would help them accomplish professional aspirations, may exercise that option.

== Baccalauréat général (post-2019) ==
From 2019, the S, ES and L streams of the general baccalaureate have been replaced by three specialty streams, taken during the penultimate year (Première), only two of which are kept in the final year (Terminale). There are 13 subjects specific to the three spécialités (majors, litt. "specialities") : arts, history, geography, political science & geopolitics (HGGSP), humanities, languages, literature, mathematics, computer science, physics & chemistry, economic & social sciences (SES), engineering sciences, biology & geology, and Physical education sport practices & cultures (EPPCS ) . These subjects are added to a set common to all : French, philosophy, history & geography, languages (LVB and LVC), sciences and sport. A large part of the tests is now in continuous control but the students also have a final oral test or written exam.

Spécialités (majors)	Weight (total 100)	Format of exam	Duration
Arts	16		3h30 written + 30min oral exam
EPPCS (Physical education, sport practices and cultures)	16		3h30 written + 2 x 15min oral exam
HGGSP (History, geography, geopolitics and political sciences)	16	essay and commentary on text or image	4 hours (written)
HLP (Humanities, literature and philosophy)	16		4 hours (written)
LLCER (Local and foreign languages, literature and cultures)	16		3 hours 30 minutes (written), 20 minutes (oral)
LLCA (Antique literature and cultures)	16		4 hours (written)
Mathematics	16		4 hours (written)
NSI (Digital and computer sciences)	16		3h30 written + practical exam
Physics and chemistry	16		3h30 written + practical exam
SVT (Earth sciences)	16		3h30 written + practical exam
SI (Engineering sciences)	16		3h30 written + practical exam
SES (Economics and social sciences)	16	three-part exam (course-based questions) or essay	4 hours (written)
Biology and ecology	16		3h30 written + practical exam

== Baccalauréat technologique ==
The technological baccalaureate is one of the three tracks of the French baccalaureate. It is obtained in a Lycée technologique. The teaching of the lessons is based on inductive reasoning and experimentation. It allows the student to work or to pursue short and technical studies (laboratory, design and applied arts, hotel and restaurant management, etc.).

It currently has eight sections : STMG (Sciences and Technologies of Management), ST2S (Sciences and Technologies of Healthcare), STI2D (Sciences and Technologies of Industry and Sustainable Development), STD2A (Sciences and Technologies of Design and Applied Art), STHR (Hospitality Industry and Business), STL (Science and Technologies of Laboratory), STAV (Science and Technologies of Agronomy and Living Organisms), S2TMD (Science and Technologies of Theatre, Music and Dance).

== Baccalauréat professionnel ==
The professional baccalaureate allows rapid integration into working life. It is obtained in a Lycée professionnel.

The professional baccalaureate includes nearly 100 specialties like : leather crafts; building technician; maintenance of industrial equipment; cook; road freight transport driver; butcher; etc.

== Format ==
The baccalauréat général examination takes place in the two last years of the lycée: première and terminale. From 2021 a large part of the tests is now in continuous control.

Most examinations are given in essay form. The student is given a substantial block of time (depending on the exam, that is from two to five hours) to complete a multiple-page, well-argued paper. The number of pages varies from exam to exam but is usually substantial considering all answers have to be written down, explained and justified. Mathematics and science exams are problem sets but some science questions also require an essay-type answer. Before the 2019 reform, foreign-language exams often have a short translation section as well. The Mathematics and Earth & Life Sciences examinations may occasionally contain some multiple-choice questions (choix multiples), but this is rare and, when it occurs, does not constitute the majority of the exam.

Students of the baccalauréat général also have to work on an oral research project (travaux personnels encadrés or TPE). It focuses on their specialties, under the supervision of a faculty member. The oral examination takes place in front of a jury of teachers. There are also several oral exams in languages; practical work in science or arts; or physical evaluation in sport.

When taken in mainland France, the baccalauréat material is the same for all students in a given stream. The secrecy surrounding the material is very tight, and the envelopes containing the exams are unsealed by a high-ranking school officer (usually a principal or vice-principal) in front of the examinees only a few minutes prior to the start of the examination. The procedure is the same for each subject, in each stream. Students usually have an identification number and an assigned seat. The number is written on all exam material and the name is hidden by folding and sealing the upper right-hand corner of the examination sheet(s). That way, anonymity is respected. The papers are usually marked by a member of the teaching staff in the same district or, at a larger scale, in the same académie. To avoid conflicts of interest, a teacher who has lectured to a student or group of students cannot grade that exam. Also, to ensure greater objectivity on the part of the examiners, the test is anonymous. The grader sees only an exam paper with a serial number, with all personally identifying material stripped away and forbidden from appearing, thus curbing any favoritism based upon sex, religion, national origin, or ethnicity.

Students generally take the French Language & Literature exam at the end of première since that subject is not taught in terminale, where it is replaced with Philosophy. It also has an oral examination component, along with the written part. The oral exam covers works studied throughout première. However, in L, students do have a literature exam in terminale.

=== Weighting system ===
Each baccalauréat stream has its own set of subjects that each carry a different weighting (coefficient). That allows some subjects to be more important than others. For example, before the 2019 reform, in the ES stream, Economics & Social Sciences carries more weight than the natural sciences and so the former is more important than the latter. Students usually study more for exams that carry heavier weightings since the grades that they obtain in these exams have a bigger impact on their overall grade. Whether or not one passes the bac and/or receives eventual honours is determined by the calculation of that overall grade.

Today, each subject is weighted according to a specific coefficient. Subjects considered as specialties receive a higher coefficient of 16, while core subjects such as French, History-Geography, foreign languages... usually receive a lower coefficient.

=== Le baccalauréat français international ===
The general baccalaureate offers several additional variants. The best-known subset is the baccalauréat français international, BFI (named option internationale du baccalauréat, OIB, until 2022). Sometimes translated as the "French international baccalaureate", it is unrelated to the International Baccalaureate (IB).

The BFI/OIB adds additional subjects to the French national exam. Before the 2019 reform students used to choose one of the L, ES or S streams. It differs, as students take a two-year syllabus in literature, history, and geography in a foreign language. That syllabus and the way that it is examined is modelled on the national exam of the target nation. For instance, the British Section (administered by the University of Cambridge) models the programmes on A-levels in English, History, and Geography. It is therefore necessary to be fully bilingual to complete this qualification. To date there are 16 different sections supporting 14 different languages: American, Arabic, British, (mainland) Chinese, Danish, Dutch, German, Italian, Japanese, Norwegian, Polish, Portuguese, Brazilian, Russian, Spanish and Swedish.

At the end of terminale, BFI/OIB students have extra exams in Literature and History/Geography, with a written and oral component to both exams, and since 2024 (with the BFI reform) an oral on a free research project linked to the country of the section, known as Connaissance du monde. These exams have a high weighting in the final mark of the baccalaureate and do not give extra points to BFI/OIB students. Overall, these students work more (up to an additional 10 hours per week of classes, with a significant amount of required reading and homework attached as well) than the other general baccalaureate students, and many of them tend to go to foreign universities. University admissions tutors often consider reducing the entrance requirements for students taking the BFI compared with those taking the standard French baccalaureate to reflect the additional demands of the BFI.

Since the students that attend these schools make up a fairly small demographic, they tend to be spread over a far larger area than would traditionally be expected of a normal lycée or secondary school. As a consequence, many of these students must commute long distances, with one-hour trips each way being fairly common. The long commutes, longer days, and increased workload that come with the BFI place great demands on students; many cannot handle the workload and transfer to schools offering the standard French baccalaureate. Thus, many consider the BFI qualification to be highly challenging and a sign, not only of academic prowess, but also of tenacity and hard work.

== Baccalauréat général (Pre-2019 reform) ==
The main purpose of the general baccalaureate is to access universities and grandes écoles to pursue higher academic education. It attests to an advanced level in general skills. It is obtained in a Lycée général.

Before 2019, students who would sit for the baccalauréat général chose one of three streams (termed séries) in their penultimate lycée year (S for Sciences; ES for Economics and Social sciences; and L for Literature). Each stream assigned different weights (coefficients) to each subject and resulted in a specialisation.

The streams of the Baccalauréat général before 2021 were as follows:

L Littéraire (Literature)	S Scientifique (Sciences)	ES sciences Économiques et Sociales (Economics and Social sciences)
The bac L (bac littéraire) weighs French literature, philosophy, foreign languages and arts heavily.	The sciences stream (bac S or bac scientifique) requires a high level in mathematics, physics & chemistry, biology & geology and, if available, engineering sciences and computer science.	The bac ES (bac économique et social) requires a high level in economics & social sciences; and also in mathematics, history & geography.

Another terminology is sometimes used that pertains to the curriculum before 1994, which further divided two of the séries. Until then, it was possible to sit for a bac C or D (which comprise the current S), a bac B (currently ES), or a bac A1, A2 or A3 (which comprise the current L). People who passed the baccalauréat before the reform still use that terminology in referring their diploma.

The baccalauréat permits students to sit exams in over forty languages, including French regional languages such as Alsatian, Breton, Catalan or Norman.

=== Baccalauréat général : série Littéraire (L) ===
Students in the L stream prepare for careers in education, linguistics, literature, philosophy, public service, politics, sociology, management, business administration, law, and economics. They also have interests in the arts. The most important subjects in the literary stream are Philosophy, French language, Literature, Arts and other Languages, usually English, German and Spanish.

Subjects	Weight	Format of exam	Duration
Anticipated subjects^{a}
French Language & Literature	3	Written	4 hours
French Language & Literature	2	Oral	30 minutes of preparation plus 20 minutes
Sciences (Physics, Chemistry and Biology) (same school curricula as ES stream)	2	Written	1 1/2 hours
Travaux personnels encadrés (TPE; Supervised Personal Work)	2^{c}	Oral	Ten minutes for each pupil (TPE is an exam generally prepared by groups of 3 pupils)
Terminale subjects
Philosophy	7	Written	4 hours
Literature	4	Written	2 hours
History & Geography (same school curricula as ES stream)	4	Written	4 hours
First Foreign Language (LV1)	4	Written	3 hours
Second Foreign Language (LV2) or Regional Language (LVR)	4	Written	3 hours
Physical Education	2	Year-end average	
Foreign Literature in Foreign Language (LV1 or LV2) (LELE)	1	Oral	10 minutes
Specialisations
Detailed LV1 or LV2	+4	Oral	20 minutes
Third Foreign Language (Chinese, Italian, ...)	4	Oral	20 minutes
Law and Major Issues of the Contemporary World (DGEMC or droit)	4	Oral	20 minutes
Latin or Ancient Greek	4	Written	3 hours
Mathematics	3	Written	3 hours
Arts & Crafts or Cinema & Audiovisual Studies or Art History or Music or Theatre & Dramatic Expression or Dance	6	Written and oral	3½ hours and ½-hour
Supplementary Physical Education	2	Year-end average	
Optional subjects^{c}
Foreign Language	2^{b}	Oral or written (depending on the language)	20 minutes or 2 hours
Regional Language	2^{b}	Oral	20 minutes
Latin	2^{b}	Oral	15 minutes
Ancient Greek	2^{b}	Oral	15 minutes
Physical Education	2^{b}	Year-end average or examination	
Arts (can be Fine Art or Cinema & Audiovisual Studies)	2^{b}	Oral	30–40 minutes
^{a}Exams at the end of première. French is replaced by Philosophy and Literature in terminale.^{b}Only points above 10 out of 20 (50%) are taken into consideration. Multiplied by two for first subject (except Latin and Greek, where the multiplier is three) and by one for the second subject.^{c}Two-subject maximum.

=== Baccalauréat général : série Scientifique (S) ===
The S stream prepares students for work in scientific fields such as medicine, engineering and the natural sciences. Science students must specialise in Mathematics, Physics & Chemistry, Computer Science or Earth & Life Sciences. Students in this stream must generally have a good result in Physics & Chemistry, Mathematics, Earth & Life Sciences and, if available, Engineering Sciences and Computer Science.

Subjects	Weight	Format of exam	Duration
Anticipated subjects^{a}
French Language	2	Written	4 hours
French Language	2	Oral	30 minutes of preparation + 20 minutes
Travaux personnels encadrés (TPE)	2^{c}	Oral and written	Students must choose a science-related subject. They need to sum it up into a file (generally around 30 pages) and present it to several professors who will then assign them an individual rating out of 20. Five minutes are allotted for each pupil. This exam is generally prepared by groups of 3 (or occasionally 4) students. They also have to write a 2-page essay about how they participated in the project. The student's grade is based on the documents they present, their oral presentation, and, where applicable, any practical, relevant experiences they may have gained.
Terminale subjects
History & Geography	3	Written	3 hours
Mathematics	7 or 9	Written	4 hours
Physics & Chemistry	6 or 8	Written and laboratory	3½ hours plus 1 hour
Earth & Life Sciences	6 or 8	Written and laboratory	3½ hours plus 1½ hour
Engineering Sciences	>4 + 5	Written and laboratory	8 hours (1 hour for electronics, 1 hour for mechanics, 4 hours for practical work and 2 hours for TPE or PPE)
Biology-Ecology	5 + 2	Written and laboratory	3½ hours plus 1 hour
First Foreign Language (LV1)	3	Written	3 hours
Second Foreign Language (LV2) or Regional Language (LVR)	2	Written	2 hours
Philosophy	3	Written	4 hours
Physical Education	2	Year-end average	
Specialisations
Mathematics or Physics & Chemistry or Earth & Life Sciences or Computer Science	2^{b}	Oral or laboratory (except for Mathematics)	1 hour (20 minutes for Computer Science)
Supplementary Physical Education	2	Year-end average	
Optional subjects^{d}
Foreign Language	2^{c} or 3^{c}	Oral or written (depending on the language)	20 minutes or 2 hours
Regional Language	2^{c} or 3^{c}	Oral	20 minutes
Latin	2^{c} or 3^{c}	Oral	15 minutes
Ancient Greek	2^{c} or 3^{c}	Oral	15 minutes
Physical Education	2^{c} or 3^{c}	Year-end average or examination	
Arts	2^{c} or 3^{c}	Oral	30–40 minutes
Langue Vivante Européenne (European Foreign Language) : Advanced language + another class (such as History or Biology) in that language	1° (+ special mention on the diploma)	Oral	40 minutes
^{a}Exam at the end of première. French is replaced by Philosophy in terminale.^{b}Added to general subject above, except for Computer Science.^{c}Only points above 10 out of 20 (50%) are taken into consideration. Multiplied by two for first subject (except Latin & Greek, where the multiplier is 3) and by one for the second subject.^{d}Two-subject maximum.

=== Baccalauréat général : série Économique et Sociale (ES) ===
Students of the ES stream prepare for careers in politics, sociology, management, business administration, law, and economics. The main and important subjects of this stream are Economics & Social Sciences, History & Geography, and Mathematics.

Subjects	Weight	Format of exam	Duration
Anticipated subjects^{a}
French Language	2	Written	4 hours
French Language	2	Oral	30 minutes of preparation plus 20 minutes
Sciences (Physics, Chemistry, and Biology) (same school curricula as L stream)	2	Written	1½ hours
Travaux personnels encadrés (TPE)	2^{c}	Oral and written	Research all year long plus a report plus an oral of about 30 minutes
Terminale subjects
History & Geography (same school curricula as L stream)	5	Written	4 hours
Mathematics	5 or 7^{f}	Written	3 hours
Economics & Social Sciences	7 or 9^{f}	Written	4 hours^{b}
First Foreign Language (LV1)	3	Written and oral	3 hours + 10 minutes
Second Foreign Language (LV2) or Regional Language (LVR)	2	Written and oral	2 hours + 10 minutes
Philosophy	4	Written	4 hours
Physical Education	2	Year-end average	
Specialisations
Detailed Economy (Health Economy, Demography, Competition Policy, Monopoly, Financial Regulation) or Applied Mathematics or Social Sciences & Politics (Democracy, Political Participation, Policy in European Union)^{g}	2^{c}	Written	1 hour
Supplementary Physical Education	2	Year-end average	
Optional Subjects^{e}
Foreign Language	2^{d}	Oral or written (depending on the language)	20 minutes or 2 hours
Regional Language	2^{d}	Oral	20 minutes
Latin	2^{d}	Oral	15 minutes
Ancient Greek	2^{d}	Oral	15 minutes
Physical Education	2^{d}	Year-end average or examination	
Arts	2^{d}	Oral	30–40 minutes
^{a} Exams at the end of première. French is replaced by Philosophy in terminale.^{b} The exam is 5 hours long for students in this specialisation. An additional topic with a duration of 1 hour is distributed at the beginning of the test to all students who choose this specialisation.^{c} Added to general subject above.^{d} Only points above 10 out of 20 (50%) are taken into consideration. Multiplied by two for first subject (except Latin & Greek, where the multiplier is three) and by one for the second subject.^{e} Two-subject maximum.^{f} The highest weight is applied to students who choose this specialisation.^{g} The test of economy specialty is included in the compulsory economy test; it is the same for mathematics. The test of English specialty is not included in the compulsory English test.

=== Different languages ===
To test their foreign or regional language students can choose among these different languages (though not at all schools): the foreign languages English, German, Arabic, Armenian, Cambodian, Chinese, Danish, Spanish, Finnish, Modern Greek, Hebrew, Italian, Japanese, Dutch, Norwegian, Polish, Portuguese, Russian, Turkish, Vietnamese; and the regional languages Basque, Breton, Catalan, Corsican, Auvergnat, Gascon, Languedoc, Limousin, Niçard, Provençal, Vivaro-Alpine, regional languages of Alsace, regional languages of Moselle, Tahitian, Albanian, Amharic, Melanesian languages, Bambara, Berber, Bulgarian, Khmer, Korean, Croatian, Hausa, Hindi, Hungarian, Indonesian, Malaysian, Laotian, Lithuanian, Macedonian, Malagasy, Persian, Fulani, Romanian, Serbian, Slovak, Slovenian, Swedish, Swahili, Tamil, Czech.

=== Reforms ===
In 2021, the general baccalaureate underwent a reformation. Since November 2017, an initiative spearheaded by minister Jean-Michel Blanquer has united numerous actors from the field of education to reinvent this system to have less exams (now only four) in conjunction with a large oral examination. The old streams (S, ES and L) equally disappeared and, rather than being entirely decided by final examinations, 40% of the student's final grade will consist of demonstrated success over the course of the school year.

In 2025, the Minister of National Education, Élisabeth Borne, reintroduced mathematics as a compulsory subject in première only for the general and technological streams. This is to reaffirm the importance of mathematics within the French school curriculum.

== Passing and honours ==
The pass mark is 10 out of 20. The 2014 success rate for the baccalauréat in mainland France was 87.9%.

For the baccalauréat, four levels of honours are given:

- A mark between 12 and 13.99 will earn a mention assez bien (honours, lit. "fairly good");
- A mark between 14 and 15.99 will earn a mention bien (high honours, lit. "good");
- A mark above 16 will earn a mention très bien (very high honours, lit. "very good");
- A mark of 18 and above will also earn the candidate a félicitations du jury (highest honours, lit. “congratulations from the [examination] jury”).

Honours are prestigious but not crucial, as admissions to the classes préparatoires (preparatory classes), which prepare students for the grande école examinations, are decided months before the examination.

French educators seldom use the entire grading scale. The same applies when marking the baccalauréat. Therefore, students are very unlikely to get a 20 out of 20 (before 2019 it was actually possible to get more than 20 because of options like Arts, Music, Latin, etc.). It is also very rare to see scores lower than 5.

Grade inflation has become a concern. Between 2005 and 2016 the proportion of students receiving at least an honor in the general baccalauréat increased by 65%.

=== European section ===
A European section is an option in French high schools to teach a subject through a European language other than French. It also gives pupils the opportunity of having more hours in the language studied. It is also an opportunity to learn more about the culture of the country of which the language is being spoken. For example, if learning History in Spanish, the history of Spain and that of Central and South America would be emphasized. Teachers present their lessons in English, German, Italian or Spanish.

At the end, students can receive a "European section" mention on their baccalaureat. To have that mention, they need to get at least 12/20 on their language examination and at least 10/20 at an additional oral examination on the subject in the language.

For example, those who choose History in Spanish as an additional subject would take their Spanish examination like the rest of their classmates, who do not have History in Spanish, and get at least 12/20. They then have to pass an oral examination on history in Spanish and get at least 10/20.

=== Supplemental examination ===
A student who averages between 9.5 and 9.99 is permitted to sit for the épreuve de rattrapage (also called the second groupe), a supplemental oral examination is given in two subjects of the student's choice. A student who does well enough in those examinations to raise the overall weighted grade to a 10 gets the baccalauréat. A student who does poorly in the orals and receives below a 10 may choose to repeat the final year of lycée (terminale).

Students may not redo the entire examination in September; the September examinations may be taken only by those who have not been able to take the June examinations for serious reasons (such as illness).

== See also ==
- Academic grading in France
- Education in France
- Baccalauréat technologique
- International Baccalaureate
- European Baccalaureate
- French-German Baccalaureate
- Laure-Gatet High School
- Literary commentary in the French baccalaureate

== Note ==
1. The formula was taken from the Lycée Claudel website, a French lycée in Ottawa, Canada, and might only be accurate for Canadian—or even Ontarian—percentage grades. In Ontario, an 80% grade is an "A" on the American Scale and the student is awarded an Ontario Scholar Diploma. A 90% grade is an A+ on the American Scale, is considered a grade with honours, and automatically qualifies the student for government-funded scholarships and bursaries. The formula should be used for comparison only.
