= Sébastien Peytavie =

French politician

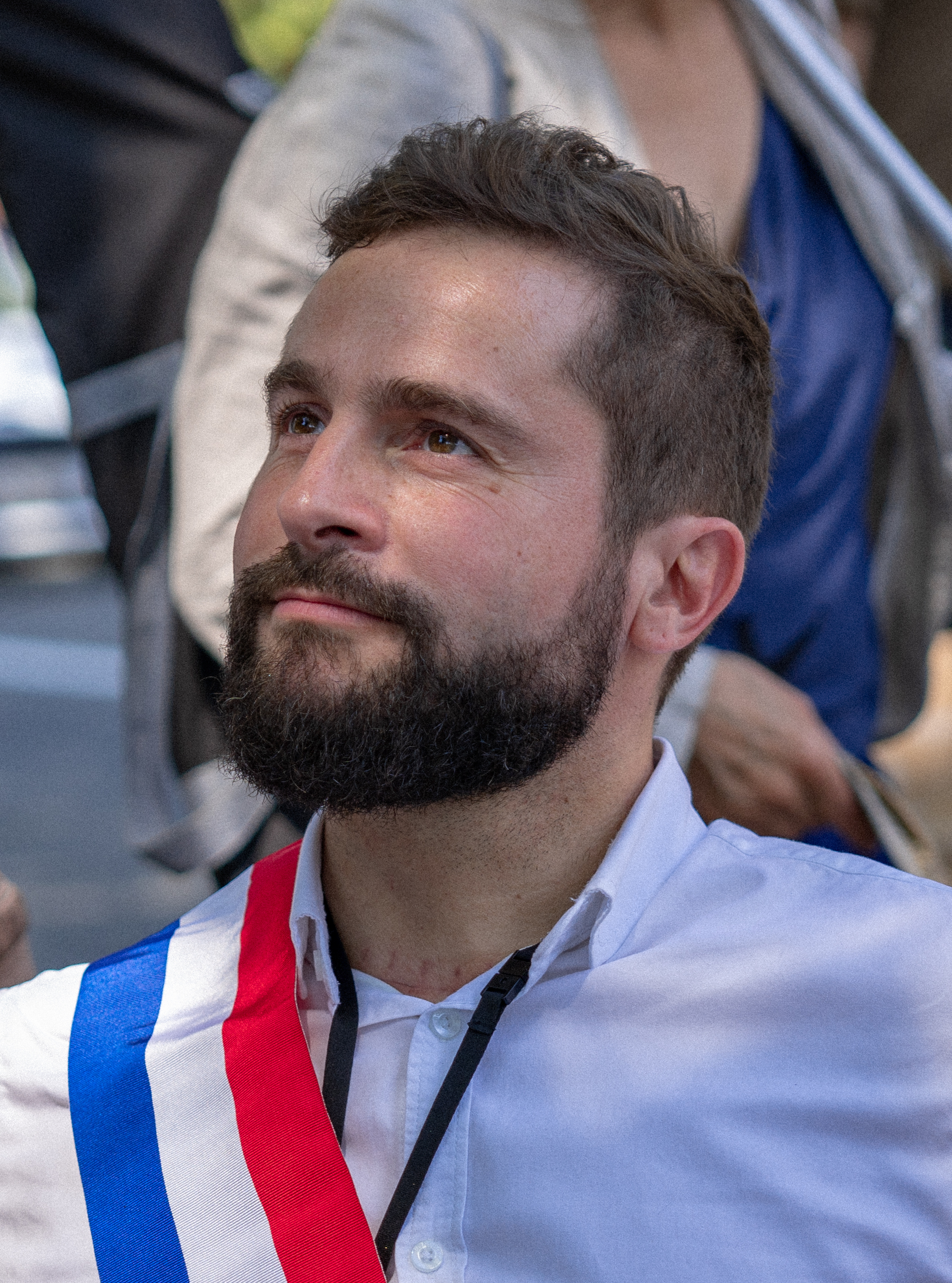

Member of the National Assembly for Dordogne's 4th constituency
- Incumbent
- Assumed office 22 June 2022
- Preceded by: Jacqueline Dubois

Personal details
- Born: 17 April 1982 (age 43) Sarlat-la-Canéda, Dordogne, France
- Party: Génération.s

Sébastien Peytavie (born 17 April 1982) is a French politician from Génération·s who has represented the 4th constituency of Dordogne in the National Assembly since 2022.

Being a wheelchair user, Peytavie coauthored a proposal to remove sitting and standing as a voting method in the National Assembly, which passed on 12 March 2025.

== See also ==
- List of deputies of the 16th National Assembly of France
