= Baccalauréat technologique =

French educational qualification

The baccalauréat technologique (English: technological baccalaureate) currently has eight sections. It is obtained in a Lycée technologique at the age of 18. The teaching of the lessons is based on inductive reasoning and experimentation. It allows students to work or to pursue short and technical studies.

Students can choose from a variety of specialities, such as laboratory science, hotel management, or marketing management.

Within France, there are three main types of baccalauréat degrees:

- the baccalauréat général (general baccalaureate);
- the baccalauréat professionnel (professional baccalaureate);
- the baccalauréat technologique (technological baccalaureate).

== History ==
Technological baccalaureates were created in 1968 and are grouped into three sets:

Series F:

- F1: Mechanical engineering
- F2: Electronics
- F3: Electrical
- F4: Civil engineering
- F5: Physics
- F6: Chemistry laboratory
- F7: Biological sciences (Biochemistry option)
- F7: Biological sciences (Biology option)
- F8: Medical and social sciences,
- F9: Energy equipment,
- F10: Microtechnology (divided into F10A: Micro devices option and F10B: Micro-optics option)
- F11: Techniques of music
- F11: Techniques of dance
- F12: Applied arts (1980)

Series G:

- G1: Business administration
- G2: Quantitative management techniques
- G3: Commercial techniques

Series H: Computer techniques

The 1992 reform put in place the following series:

- Industrial science and technology (ITS);
- Science and technology laboratory (STL);
- Tertiary science and technology (STT);
- Medical social sciences (SMS)
- Hospitality (removing the old patent BT technician and implementing the more general and versatile BTNH built around the various activities of the hotel world, namely applied management, culinary arts, tableware and service and reception / floors and accommodation).

After the renovation of the sector STT (STG in 2005 and MGT in 2012) and SMS (ST2S in 2007), it became industrial science and technology in 2011, which is split into two new sets: science and technology design and applied arts (STD2A) and science and technology industry and sustainable development (STI2D).

== 8 current sections ==
STMG Sciences et technologies du management et de la gestion (Sciences and Technologies of Management)	ST2S Sciences et technologies sanitaires et sociales (Sciences and Technologies of Health Care)	STI2D Sciences et technologies de l'industrie et développement durable (Sciences and Technologies of Industry and Sustainable Development)	STD2A Sciences et technologies du Design et arts appliqués (Sciences and Technologies of Design and Applied Arts)	STHR Sciences et technologies de l’hôtellerie et de la restauration (Hospitality Industry and Business)	STL Sciences et technologies de laboratoire (Sciences and Technologies of Laboratory)	S2TMD Sciences et technologies du théâtre, de la musique et de la danse (Science and Technologies of Theater, Music and Dance)	STAV Sciences et technologies de l'agronomie et du vivant (Science and Technologies of Agronomy and Living Organisms)

== See also ==
- Baccalauréat
- Education in France
- European Baccalaureate
- International Baccalaureate
- Laure-Gatet High School
