= Institut national de la statistique et des études économiques =

France's principal government institution in charge of statistics and census data

National Institute of Statistics and Economic Studies
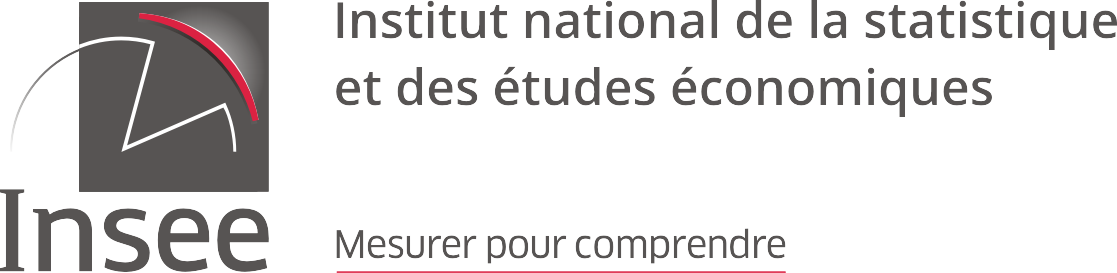

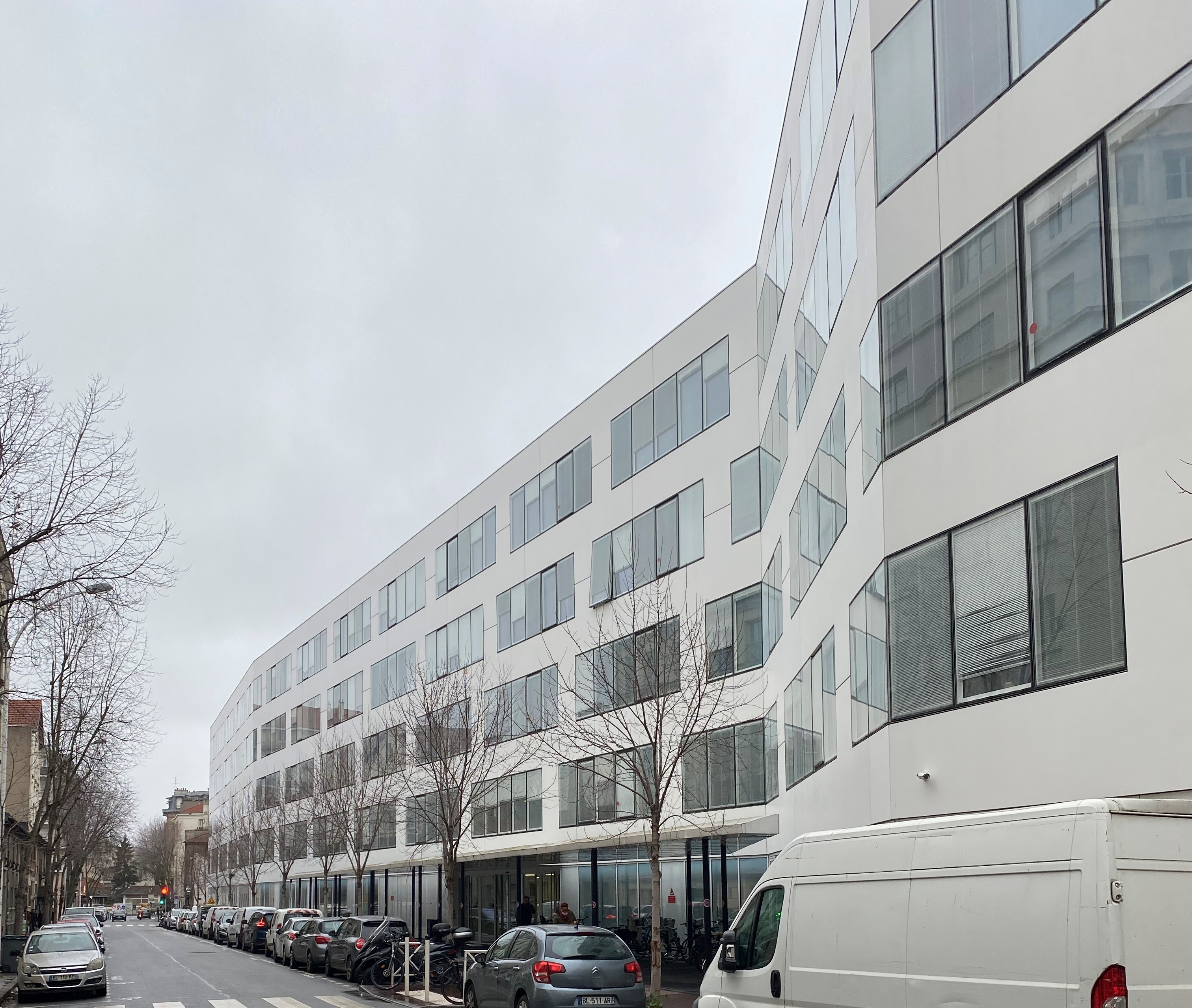
- Headquarters in Montrouge, France

Agency overview
- Formed: 27 April 1946; 80 years ago
- Preceding agency: Service national des statistiques
- Type: Government agency
- Jurisdiction: France
- Headquarters: 88 Avenue Verdier Montrouge France; 48°48′59″N 02°18′26″E
- Minister responsible: Bruno Le Maire, Ministry of Economics and Finance
- Agency executive: Jean-Luc Tavernier, Director general
- Website: insee.fr

The National Institute of Statistics and Economic Studies (French: Institut national de la statistique et des études économiques, pronounced [ɛ̃stity nɑsjɔnal də la statistik e dez‿etyd(z‿)ekɔnɔmik]), abbreviated INSEE or Insee (/ˈɪnseɪ/ in-SAY, French: [inse]), is the national statistics bureau of France. It collects and publishes information about the French economy and people and carries out the periodic national census. Headquartered in Montrouge, a commune in the southern Parisian suburbs, it is the French branch of Eurostat. The INSEE was created in 1946 as a successor to the Vichy regime's National Statistics Service (SNS). It works in close cooperation with the Institut national d'études démographiques (INED).

== Purpose ==
The INSEE is responsible for the production and analysis of official statistics in France. Its best known responsibilities include:

- Organising and publishing the national census
- Producing various indices – which are widely recognised as being of excellent quality – including an inflation index used for determining the rates of rents and the costs associated with construction
- Eurostat uses INSEE statistics in combination with those of other national statistical agencies to compile comparable statistics for the European Union as a whole. It is also widely recognized as representing France on international questions of statistics.

== Organisation ==
The INSEE is the responsibility of MINEFI, the French Ministry of Finance. The current director is Jean-Luc Tavernier. However, Eurostat considers INSEE as an independent body, although its independence is not written in the law.

=== Teaching and research ===
Research and teaching for the INSEE is undertaken by GENES or Group of the National Schools of the Economy and Statistics (French: Groupe des Écoles Nationales d'Économie et Statistique) which includes:

- ENSAE (École nationale de la statistique et de l'administration économique), a grande école which trains INSEE administrators and engineers specialized in statistics, the economy, and finance.
- ENSAI (École nationale de la statistique et de l'analyse de l'information), an engineering school.

== Codes and numbering system ==
INSEE gives numerical indexing codes (French: les Codes INSEE) to various entities in France:

- INSEE codes (known as COG) are given to various administrative units, notably the French communes (they do not coincide with postcodes). The 'complete' code has 8 digits and 3 spaces within, but there is a popular 'simplified' code with 5 digits and no space within:
  - 2 digits (département) and 3 digits (commune) for the 96 départements of Metropolitan France.
  - 3 digits (département or collectivity) and 2 digits (commune) for the Overseas departments, Overseas Territorial Collectivities and Overseas Countries and Territories.
- INSEE numbers (13 digits + a two-digit key) are national identification numbers given to people. The format is as follows: syymmlllllooo kk, where
  - s is 1 for a male, 2 for a female for a permanent number; it is 7 for a male, 8 for a female for a temporary number,
  - yy are the last two digits of the year of birth,
  - mm is the month of birth or a number above 20 if the birthdate is unknown
  - lllll is the COG for the location of birth,
  - ooo is an order number to distinguish people being born at the same place in the same year and month.
  - 'kk' is the "control key", equal to 97-(the rest of the number modulo 97).
    There are exceptions for people in particular situations.
- SIREN codes are given to businesses and nonprofit associations, SIRET codes to their establishments and facilities.

== History ==
Former INSEE headquarters in Malakoff, Hauts-de-Seine

=== Statistics in France before the INSEE ===
The INSEE was preceded by several related statistical agencies in France. In 1833, the Statistics Bureau (French: Bureau de la statistique) was created by Adolphe Thiers. In 1840 it was renamed SGF or General Statistics of France.

Under the direction of Lucien March, the SGF expanded its activities. It began an investigation of consumption habits in 1907, following with periodic investigations on retail prices in 1911.

In 1920 Alfred Sauvy introduced competitive entrance exams for SGF recruitment. However, it was René Carmille, a pioneer of the use of the calculator, who laid the foundations of the modern organization. In 1940, the Demographic Service (Service de la démographie) was created under the Ministry of Finance in order to replace the military recruitment office prohibited by the June 1940 Armistice with Nazi Germany. In order to better conceal its undertakings, the Demographic Service absorbed the SGF on 11 October 1941. The new organization was called the SNS or National Statistics Service. As part of this reorganization, six new offices were created in the Northern (occupied) zone whose regional structure is maintained today in INSEE.

René Carmille created an Applied Sciences School (predecessor of the current ENSAE) to specially train members for the SNS.

Carmille worked for Vichy France but he was actually a double agent for the French underground. From his position in the SNS he sabotaged the Nazi census of France, which saved untold numbers of Jewish people from death camps. He also used his department to help mobilize French resistance in Algeria. He was caught by the Nazis and sent to Dachau where he died in 1945.

=== Creation of the INSEE ===
The SNS was finally transformed into the INSEE by the law of 27 April 1946; the National Institute of Statistics and Economic Surveys for the metropolis and overseas France (L'Institut national de la statistique et des études économiques pour la métropole et la France d'outre-mer).

=== IRIS ===
IRIS is the name for France's unit of division of geographical regions for the purposes of taking a census. In order to prepare for the dissemination of the 1999 French population census, INSEE developed a system for dividing the country into units of equal size, known as IRIS2000, now known simply as 'IRIS'. The acronym stands for 'Ilots Regroupés pour l'Information Statistique' ('aggregated units for statistical information') and the 2000 in the name referred not only to the upcoming millennium year but to the target size of 2,000 residents per basic unit.

Since 1999, IRIS has represented the fundamental unit for dissemination of infra-municipal data in France and its overseas departments and regions. Towns with more than 10,000 inhabitants, and a large proportion of towns with between 5,000 and 10,000 inhabitants, are divided into several IRIS units. France is composed of around 16,100 IRIS in total, of which 650 are in the overseas departments. There are 3 types of IRIS unit in use; residential IRIS (pop. between 1,800 and 5,000), business IRIS (containing more than 1,000 employees) and miscellaneous IRIS (specific large zones which are sparsely inhabited and have large surface areas (leisure parks, ports, forests etc.).

=== List of directors ===
The following is a list of directors of the INSEE since it was founded:

- 1946–1961: Francis-Louis Closon
- 1961–1967: Claude Gruson
- 1967–1974: Jean Ripert
- 1974–1987: Edmond Malinvaud
- 1987–1992: Jean-Claude Milleron
- 1992–2003: Paul Champsaur
- 2003–2007: Jean-Michel Charpin
- 2007–2012: Jean-Philippe Cotis
- 2012–present: Jean-Luc Tavernier

== See also ==
- Observatoire National de la Pauvreté et de l'Exclusion Sociale
- Value added tax
