= SIREN code =

SIREN codes are given to French businesses and nonprofit associations, SIRET codes to their establishments and facilities. SIREN codes are maintained by the French INSEE. This is France-specific, and will not change during the lifetime of the business.

SIREN codes have 9 digits. The first 8 digits are the business reference, the last one is a check digit.

French public organizations have 1 or 2 as the first digit.

The check digit uses the Luhn algorithm.

== See also ==
- SIRET code
