= SIRET code =

Identification number for a company or an establishment in France

The SIRET code (French: Système d’identification du répertoire des établissements), or SIRET number, is an INSEE code which allows the geographic identification of any French establishment or business.

== Construction ==
This 14-figure numerical identifier is split into two parts:

- the first is the SIREN code of the legal unit to which the SIRET unit belongs;
- the second is usually called the NIC (internal ranking number; French: Numéro interne de classement), and is made up of a four-figure number attributed to the establishment and a control figure used to validate the SIRET number as a whole.

For example, 732 829 320 00074 would refer to the seventh establishment (followed by 4 as the check digit) of the business with SIREN number 732 829 320.

== Calculating a valid code ==
The SIRET number's check digit (the last) that verifies the validity of the SIRET number (SIREN + NIC). It is calculated using the Luhn formula.

== See also ==
- INSEE
- SIREN code
