= Jean-Jacques de Peretti =

French politician (born 1946)

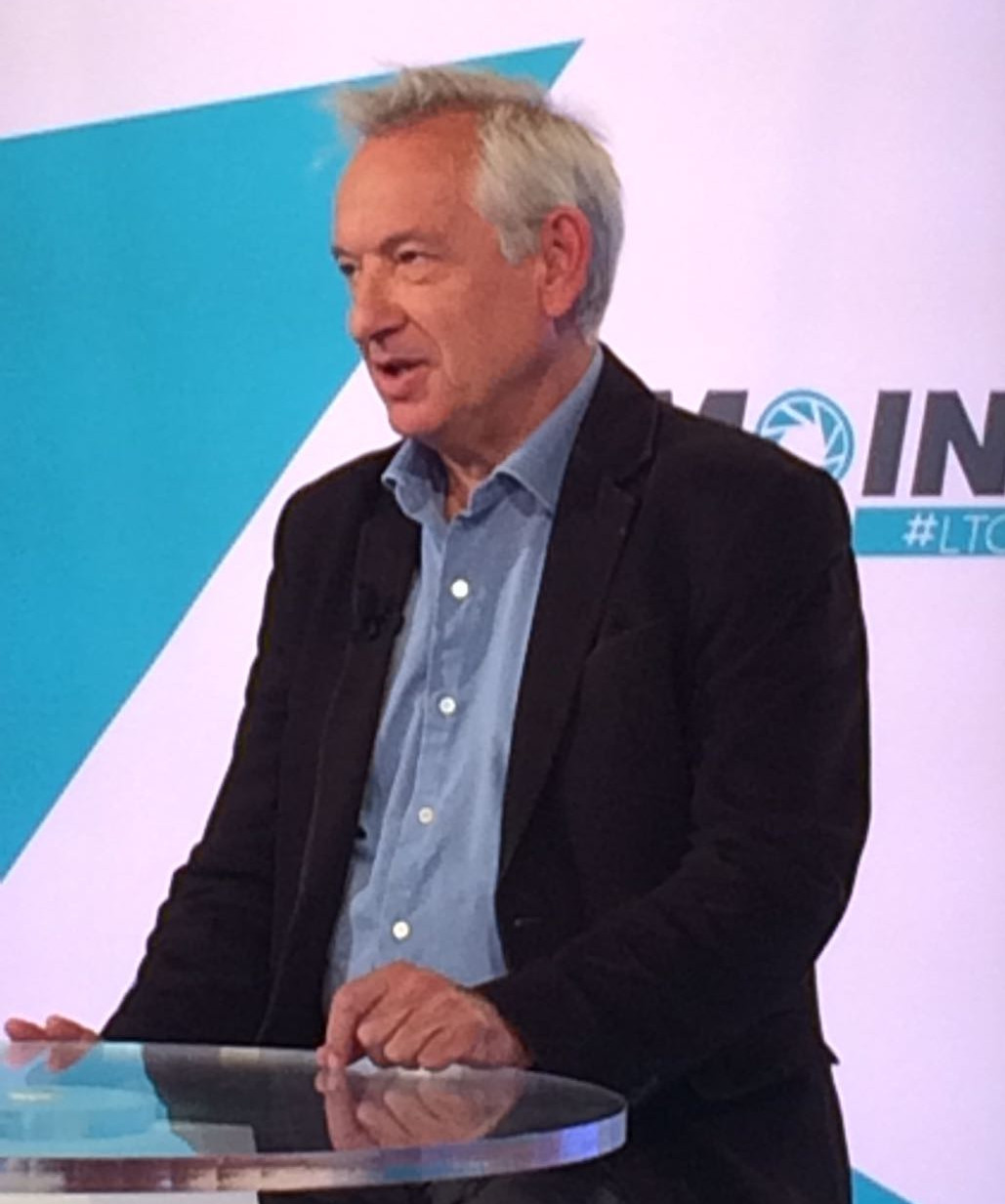

Jean-Jacques de Peretti (born 21 September 1946) is a French politician who has served as mayor of Sarlat-la-Canéda since 1989.
