= Bernard Cazeau =

French politician

Member of the French Senate for Dordogne
- In office 1998–2020

Mayor of Ribérac
- In office 1971–2001

Personal details
- Born: 27 April 1939 (age 86) Bordeaux, France
- Party: Socialist Party; La République En Marche!
- Profession: Physician

Bernard Cazeau (born 27 April 1939 in Bordeaux) is a member of the Senate of France, representing the Dordogne department. He was a member of the Socialist Party, and moved to LREM in 2017.

In addition to his role in the Senate, Cazeau has been serving as member of the Dutch delegation to the Parliamentary Assembly of the Council of Europe since 2017. As member of the Alliance of Liberals and Democrats for Europe, he is currently a member of the Committee on Social Affairs, Health and Sustainable Development and the Sub-Committee on Public Health and Sustainable Development.

== Biography ==
A doctor by profession in Ribérac, Bernard Cazeau became mayor in 1971, a position he held until 2001. In 1976, he became a general councilor for the canton of Ribérac and remained in office until 2015. He then served as president of the Dordogne General Council from 1994 to 2015, after having been its vice-president from 1982 to 1992. From 1977 to 1998, he sat on the Aquitaine Regional Council, serving as vice-president from 1982 to 1985 under the presidency of Philippe Madrelle.

He is a senator for the Dordogne, elected on September 27, 1998, then re-elected on September 21, 2008, and September 28, 2014. In the latter election, both Socialist Party (France), Claude Bérit-Débat and himself, retained their seats with over 55% of the vote in the second round.

He was also president of EPIDOR, the public territorial institution for the Dordogne (river) basin, from 1994 to June 2015.

In 2015, he did not run for re-election as departmental councilor, and Germinal Peiro succeeded him as head of the department.

He endorsed Emmanuel Macron in the 2017 presidential election, then joined his party, Renaissance (French political party), that same year. In the Senate, he left the Socialist group to join La République en Marche.

He will not be running for re-election in the 2020 French Senate election.

== Bibliography ==
- Page on the Senate website
