= Country attractiveness =

Measure of a country's appeal to investors

Country attractiveness is a multidisciplinary concept at the crossroads of development economics, macroeconomics, comparative law and political science: it aims at tracking and contrasting the relative appeal of different territories and jurisdictions competing for “scarce” investment inflows, by scoring them quantitatively and qualitatively across ad hoc series of variables such as GDP growth, tax rates, capital repatriation, etc.

There are multiple factors determining host country attractiveness in the eyes of large foreign direct institutional investors, notably pension funds and sovereign wealth funds. Research conducted by the World Pensions Council (WPC) suggests that perceived legal/political stability over time and medium-term economic growth dynamics constitute the two main determinants

"Some development economists believe that a sizeable part of Western Europe has now fallen behind the most dynamic amongst Asia's emerging markets, notably because the latter adopted policies more propitious to long-term investments: “Successful countries such as Singapore, Indonesia and South Korea still remember the harsh adjustment mechanisms imposed abruptly upon them by the IMF and World Bank during the 1997-1998 ‘Asian Crisis’ [...] What they have achieved in the past 10 years is all the more remarkable: they have quietly abandoned the “Washington consensus” [the dominant Neoclassical perspective] by investing massively in infrastructure projects [...] this pragmatic approach proved to be very successful.”

A Global Attractiveness Index has been developed since 2016 by The European House - Ambrosetti, the Italian think tank known for organizing the yearly Ambrosetti Forum. The Joint Research Centre of the European Commission (a body of the European Union) assessed the methodological choices of the Global Attractiveness Index 2020 (in its 5th edition) confirming that it is accurately designed and built.
