= Germinal Peiro =

French politician

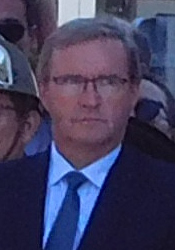
Germinal Peiro

Germinal Peiro (born September 15, 1953 in Lézignan-Corbières, Aude) Is a French politician who was a member of the National Assembly of France. He represented Dordogne's 4th constituency from 1997 to 2017 as a member of the Socialiste, radical, citoyen et divers gauche.

He was Mayor of Castelnaud-la-Chapelle from 14 March 1983 to 4 April 2014.
