= List of SNCF stations in Nouvelle-Aquitaine =

This article contains a list of current SNCF railway stations in the Nouvelle-Aquitaine region of France.

== Charente (16) ==
- Angoulême
- Chabanais
- Chalais
- Chasseneuil-sur-Bonnieure
- Châteauneuf-sur-Charente
- Cognac
- Jarnac-Charente
- Luxé
- Montmoreau
- La Rochefoucauld
- Roumazières-Loubert
- Ruelle
- Ruffec

== Charente-Maritime (17) ==
- Aigrefeuille-Le Thou
- Angoulins-sur-Mer
- Aytré-Plage
- Belliant
- Bords
- Brussac
- Châtelaillon
- La Jarrie
- Jonzac
- Loulay
- Montendre
- Pons
- Rochefort
- La Rochelle
- La Rochelle-Porte Dauphine
- Royan
- Saint-Aigulin-la-Roche-Chalais
- Saintes
- Saint-Hilaire-Brizambourg
- Saint-Jean-d'Angely
- Saint-Laurent-Fouras
- Saint-Savinien
- Saujon
- Surgères
- Tonnay-Charente
- Villeneuve-la-Comtesse

== Corrèze (19) ==
- Allassac
- Aubazine-Saint-Hilaire
- Brive-la-Gaillarde
- Bugeat
- Le Burg
- Cornil
- Corrèze
- Égletons
- Jassonneix
- Lacelle
- Lubersac
- Masseret
- Meymac
- Montaignac-Saint-Hippolyte
- Objat
- Pérols
- Pompadour
- La Rivière-de-Mansac
- Saint-Aulaire
- Tulle
- Turenne
- Ussel
- Uzerche
- Varetz
- Vigeois
- Vignols-Saint-Solve

== Creuse (23) ==
- Aubusson
- Busseau-sur-Creuse
- Felletin
- Guéret
- Lavaufranche
- Lavaveix-les-Mines
- Marsac (Creuse)
- Montaigut
- Parsac-Gouzon
- Saint-Sébastien
- La Souterraine
- Vieilleville

== Deux-Sèvres (79) ==
- Beauvoir-sur-Niort
- Bressuire
- Cerizay
- La Crèche
- Fors
- Marigny
- Mauzé
- La Mothe-Saint-Héray
- Niort
- Pamproux
- Prin-Deyrançon
- Prissé-la-Charrière
- Saint-Maixent
- Thouars

== Dordogne (24) ==
- Agonac
- Belvès
- Bergerac
- Le Bugue
- Le Buisson
- Château-l'Évêque
- Condat-Le Lardin
- La Coquille
- Couze
- Les Eyzies
- Gardonne
- Lalinde
- Lamonzie-Saint-Martin
- Lamothe-Montravel
- Mauzac
- Montpon-Ménestérol
- Mussidan
- Négrondes
- Neuvic (Dordogne)
- Niversac
- Périgueux
- Razac
- Saint-Antoine-de-Breuilh
- Saint-Astier
- Saint-Cyprien
- Saint-Léon-sur-l'Isle
- Saint-Pierre-de-Chignac
- Sarlat-la-Canéda
- Siorac-en-Périgord
- Terrasson
- Thenon
- Thiviers
- Trémolat
- Vélines
- Les Versannes
- Villefranche-du-Périgord

== Gironde (33) ==
- Aloutte-France
- Arbanats
- Arcachon
- Aubie-Saint-Antoine
- Barsac
- Bassens
- Beautiran
- Bègles
- Blanquefort
- Bordeaux-Saint-Jean
- Bruges
- Cadaujac
- Castillon
- Caudéran-Mérignac
- Caudrot
- Cavignac
- Cenon
- Cérons
- Coutras
- Cubzac-les-Ponts
- Les Églisottes
- Facture-Biganos
- Gauriaguet
- Gazinet-Cestas
- Gironde
- La Gorp
- La Grave-d'Ambarès
- Gujan-Mestras
- La Hume
- Lamothe-Landerron
- Langon
- Lesparre
- Libourne
- Ludon
- Macau
- Marcheprime
- Margaux
- Mérignac-Arlac
- Moulis-Listrac
- Parempuyre
- Pauillac
- Pessac
- Podensac
- La Pointe-de-Grave
- Portets
- Preignac
- La Réole
- Saint-André-de-Cubzac
- Saint-Denis-de-Pile
- Sainte-Eulalie-Carbon-Blanc
- Sainte-Foy-la-Grande
- Saint-Émilion
- Saint-Loubès
- Saint-Macaire
- Saint-Mariens-Saint-Yzan
- Saint-Médard-de-Guizières
- Saint-Médard-d'Eyrans
- Saint-Pierre-d'Aurillac
- Saint-Seurin-sur-l'Isle
- Saint-Sulpice-Izon
- Soulac-sur-Mer
- Le Teich
- La Teste
- Vayres
- Le Verdon
- Villenave-d'Ornon

== Haute-Vienne (87) ==
- L'Aiguille
- Aixe-sur-Vienne
- Ambazac
- Les Bardys
- Bellac
- Bersac
- Brignac
- Bussière-Galant
- Châteauneuf-Bujaleuf
- Coussac-Bonneval
- Le Dorat
- Eymoutiers-Vassivière
- Fromental
- La Jonchère
- Lafarge
- Limoges-Bénédictins
- Limoges-Montjovis
- Magnac-Vicq
- La Meyze
- Nantiat
- Nexon
- Nieul
- Peyrilhac-Saint-Jouvent
- Pierre-Buffière
- La Porcherie
- Saillat-Chassenon
- Saint-Brice-sur-Vienne
- Saint-Denis-des-Murs
- Saint-Germain-les-Belles
- Saint-Junien
- Saint-Léonard-de-Noblat
- Saint-Priest-Taurion
- Saint-Sulpice-Laurière
- Saint-Victurnien
- Saint-Yrieix-la-Perche
- Solignac-Le Vigen
- Vaulry
- Verneuil-sur-Vienne

== Landes (40) ==
- Arengosse
- Bénesse-Maremne
- Dax
- Labenne
- Labouheyre
- Mont-de-Marsan
- Morcenx
- Ondres
- Peyrehorade
- Saint-Geours-de-Maremne
- Saint-Martin-d'Oney
- Saint-Vincent-de-Tyrosse
- Saubusse-les-Bains
- Ychoux
- Ygos

== Lot-et-Garonne (47) ==
- Agen
- Aiguillon
- Laroque-Timbaut
- Marmande
- Monsempron-Libos
- Penne-d'Agenais
- Port-Sainte-Marie
- Sainte-Bazeille
- Sauveterre-la-Lémance
- Tonneins

== Pyénées-Atlantiques (64) ==
- Artix
- Assat
- Bayonne
- Bedous
- Biarritz
- Bidarray-Pont-Noblia
- Bidos
- Boucau
- Buzy-en-Béarn
- Cambo-les-Bains
- Coarraze-Nay
- La Croix du Prince
- Les Deux-Jumeaux
- Gan
- Guéthary
- Halsou-Larressore
- Hendaye
- Lurbe-Saint-Christau
- Montaut-Bétharram
- Ogeu-les-Bains
- Oloron-Sainte-Marie
- Orthez
- Ossès-Saint-Martin-d'Arrossa
- Pau
- Puyoô
- Saint-Jean-de-Luz-Ciboure
- Saint-Jean-Pied-de-Port
- Sarrance
- Urt
- Ustaritz
- Villefranque

== Vienne (86) ==
- Anché-Voulon
- Chasseneuil
- Châtellerault
- Dangé
- Dissay
- Épanvilliers
- Futuroscope
- Ingrandes-sur-Vienne
- Iteuil
- Jaunay-Clan
- Lathus
- Ligugé
- Lusignan
- Lussac-les-Châteaux
- Mignaloux-Nouaillé
- Montmorillon
- Naintré-les-Barres
- Nerpuy
- Les Ormes-sur-Vienne
- Poitiers
- Rouillé
- Saint-Saviol
- La Tricherie
- Vivonne

== See also ==
- SNCF
- List of SNCF stations for SNCF stations in other regions
