= Montpon-Ménestérol station =

Railway station in Montpon-Ménestérol, France

Coordinates: 45°00′23″N 0°09′33″E

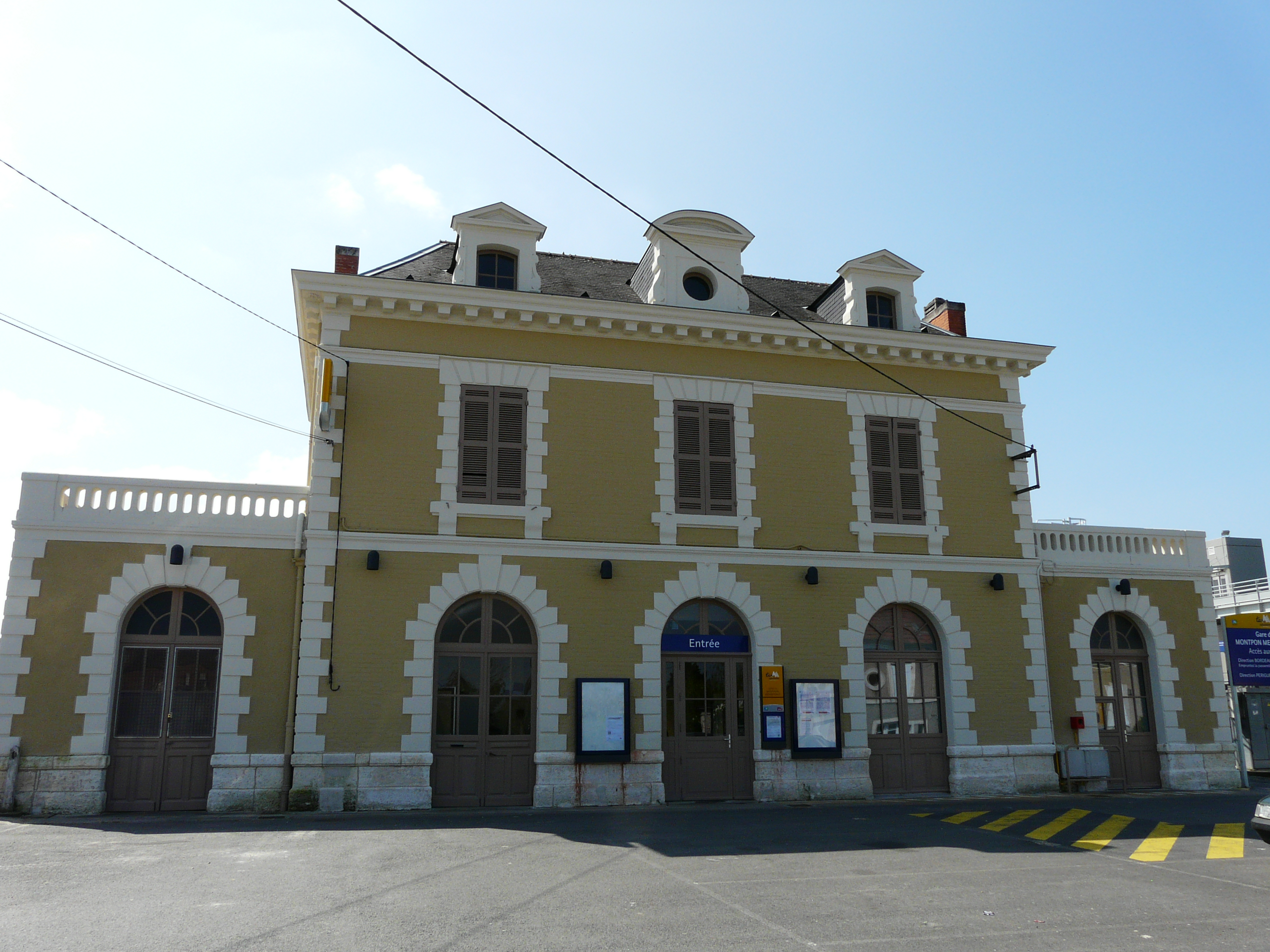
Montpon-Ménestérol station entrance

Montpon-Ménestérol is a railway station in Montpon-Ménestérol, Nouvelle-Aquitaine, France. The station is located on the Coutras - Tulle railway line. The station is served by TER (local) services operated by SNCF.

== Train services ==
The station is served by regional trains to Bordeaux, Périgueux, Limoges and Brive-la-Gaillarde.

Preceding station	TER Nouvelle-Aquitaine	Following station
Saint-Seurin-sur-l'Isle towards Bordeaux	31	Mussidan towards Limoges
Saint-Seurin-sur-l'Isle towards Bordeaux	32	Mussidan towards Ussel
