= Coutras station =

Railway station in Nouvelle-Aquitaine, France

Coordinates: 45°02′12″N 0°07′51″W

Coutras is a railway station in Coutras, Nouvelle-Aquitaine, France. The station is located on the Paris - Bordeaux and Coutras - Tulle railway lines. The station is served by TER (local) services operated by SNCF.

Opening hours: Station:

Monday to Friday: 5:30 a.m. to 10:00 p.m.

Saturday: 6:10 a.m.-1:05 p.m./2:35 p.m.-10:00 p.m.

Sunday: 8:10 a.m.-1:20 p.m./2:35 p.m.-10:00 p.m.

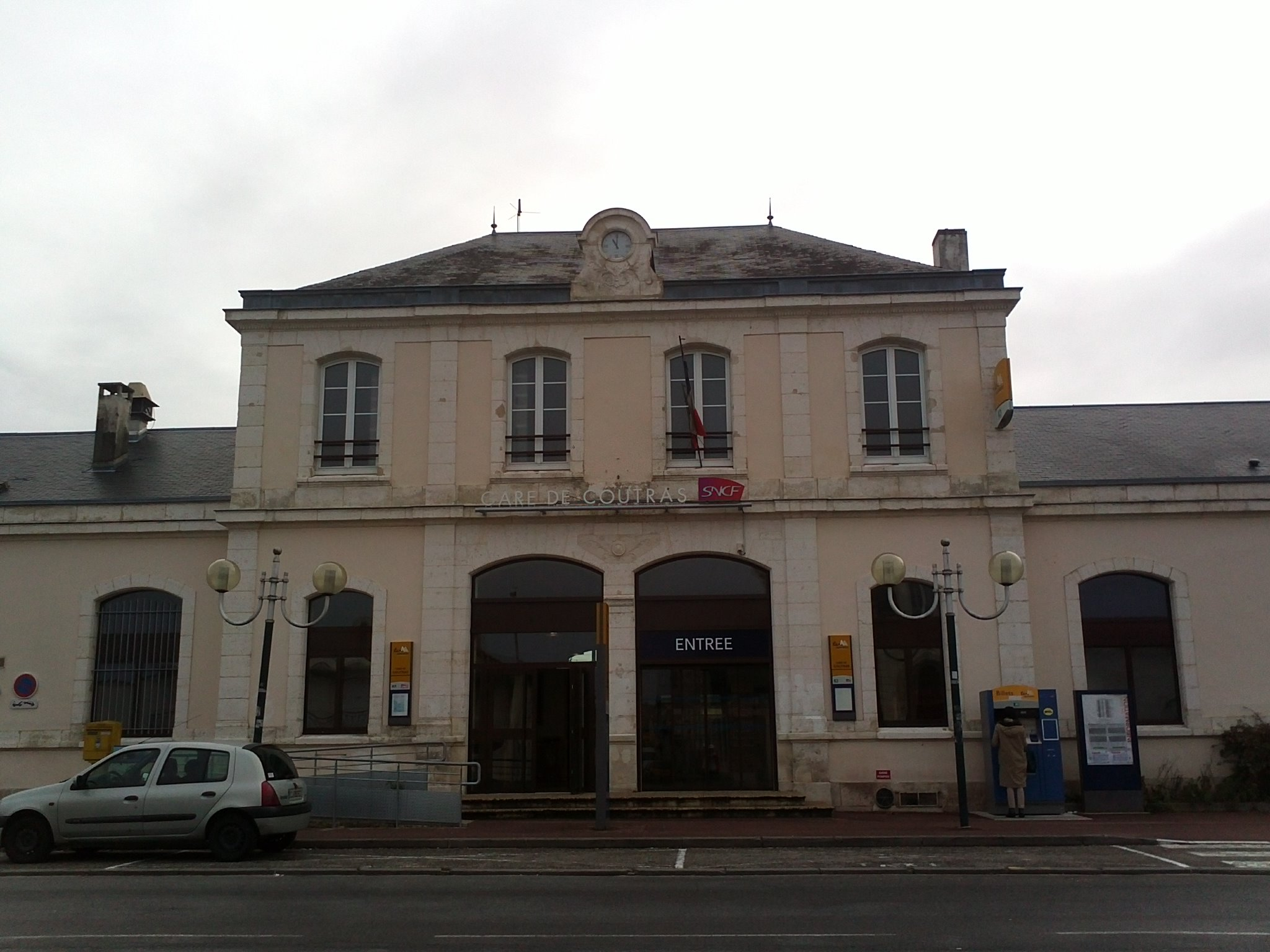
The station

== Train services ==
The station is served by regional trains to Bordeaux, Angoulême, Périgueux, Limoges and Brive-la-Gaillarde.

Preceding station	TER Nouvelle-Aquitaine	Following station
Saint-Denis-de-Pile towards Bordeaux	13	Les Églisottes towards Angoulême
Libourne towards Bordeaux	31	Saint-Médard-de-Guizières towards Limoges
Libourne towards Bordeaux	32	Saint-Médard-de-Guizières towards Ussel
Saint-Denis-de-Pile towards Bordeaux	41.1U	Terminus
