= Saint-Médard-de-Guizières station =

Railway station in Saint-Médard-de-Guizières, France

Coordinates: 45°00′56″N 0°02′54″W

Saint-Médard-de-Guizières is a railway station in Saint-Médard-de-Guizières, Nouvelle-Aquitaine, France. The station is located on the Coutras - Tulle railway line. The station is served by TER (local) services operated by SNCF.

== Train services ==
The station is served by regional trains towards Bordeaux, Périgueux, Limoges and Brive-la-Gaillarde.

Preceding station	TER Nouvelle-Aquitaine	Following station
Coutras towards Bordeaux	31	Saint-Seurin-sur-l'Isle towards Limoges
Coutras towards Bordeaux	32	Saint-Seurin-sur-l'Isle towards Ussel
