= Neuvic station (Dordogne) =

Railway station in Neuvic, France

Coordinates: 45°06′01″N 0°26′42″E

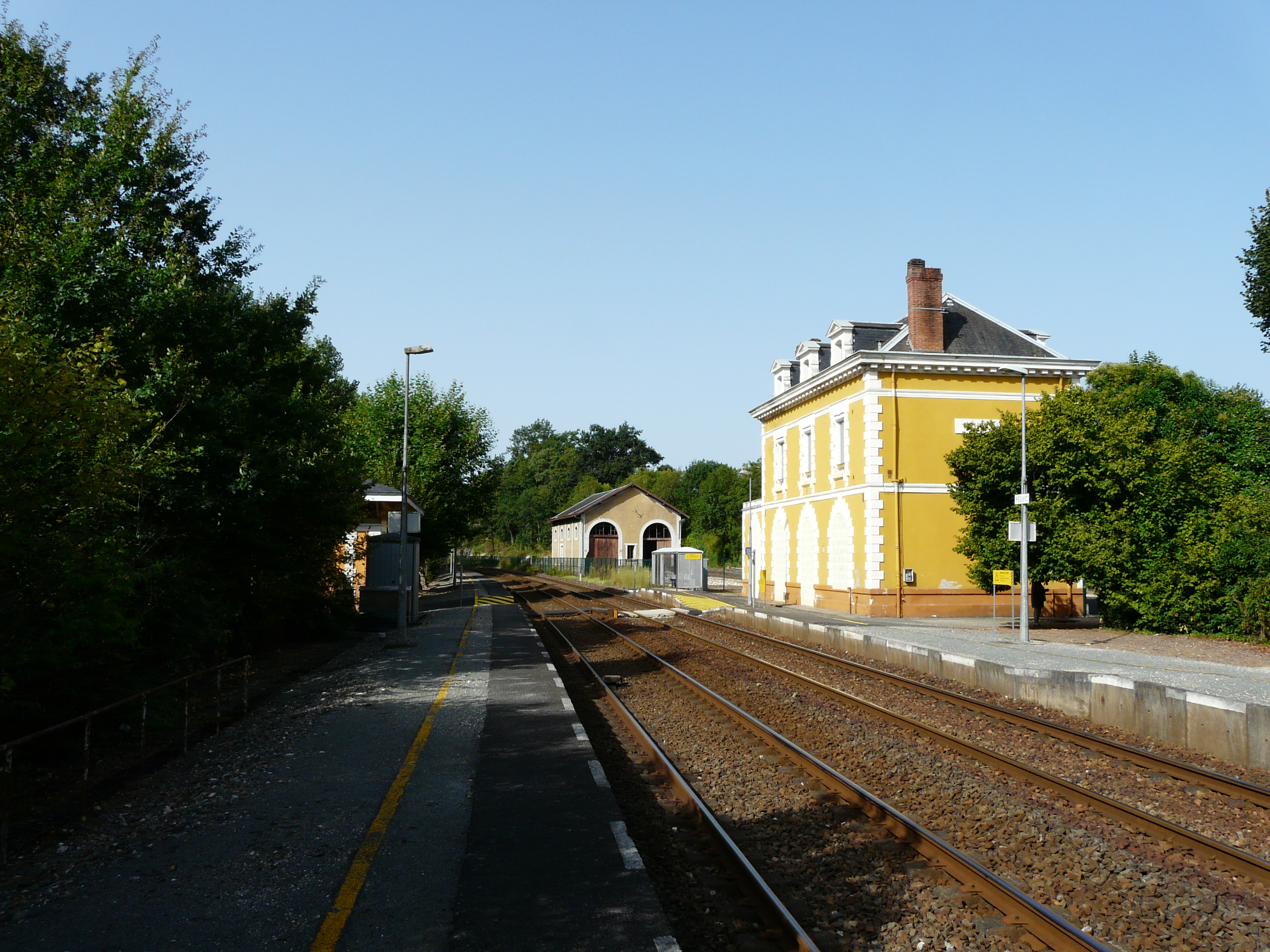
Gare de Neuvic sur l'Isle

Neuvic is a railway station in Neuvic, Nouvelle-Aquitaine, France. The station is located on the Coutras - Tulle railway line. The station is served by TER (local) services operated by SNCF.

== Train services ==
The station is served by regional trains towards Bordeaux, Périgueux, Limoges and Brive-la-Gaillarde.

| Preceding station | TER Nouvelle-Aquitaine | Following station |
|---|---|---|
| Mussidan towards Bordeaux | 31 | Saint-Léon-sur-l'Isle towards Limoges |
| Mussidan towards Bordeaux | 32 | Saint-Léon-sur-l'Isle towards Ussel |
