= Saint-Léon-sur-l'Isle station =

Railway station in Saint-Léon-sur-l'Isle, France

Coordinates: 45°07′25″N 0°29′32″E

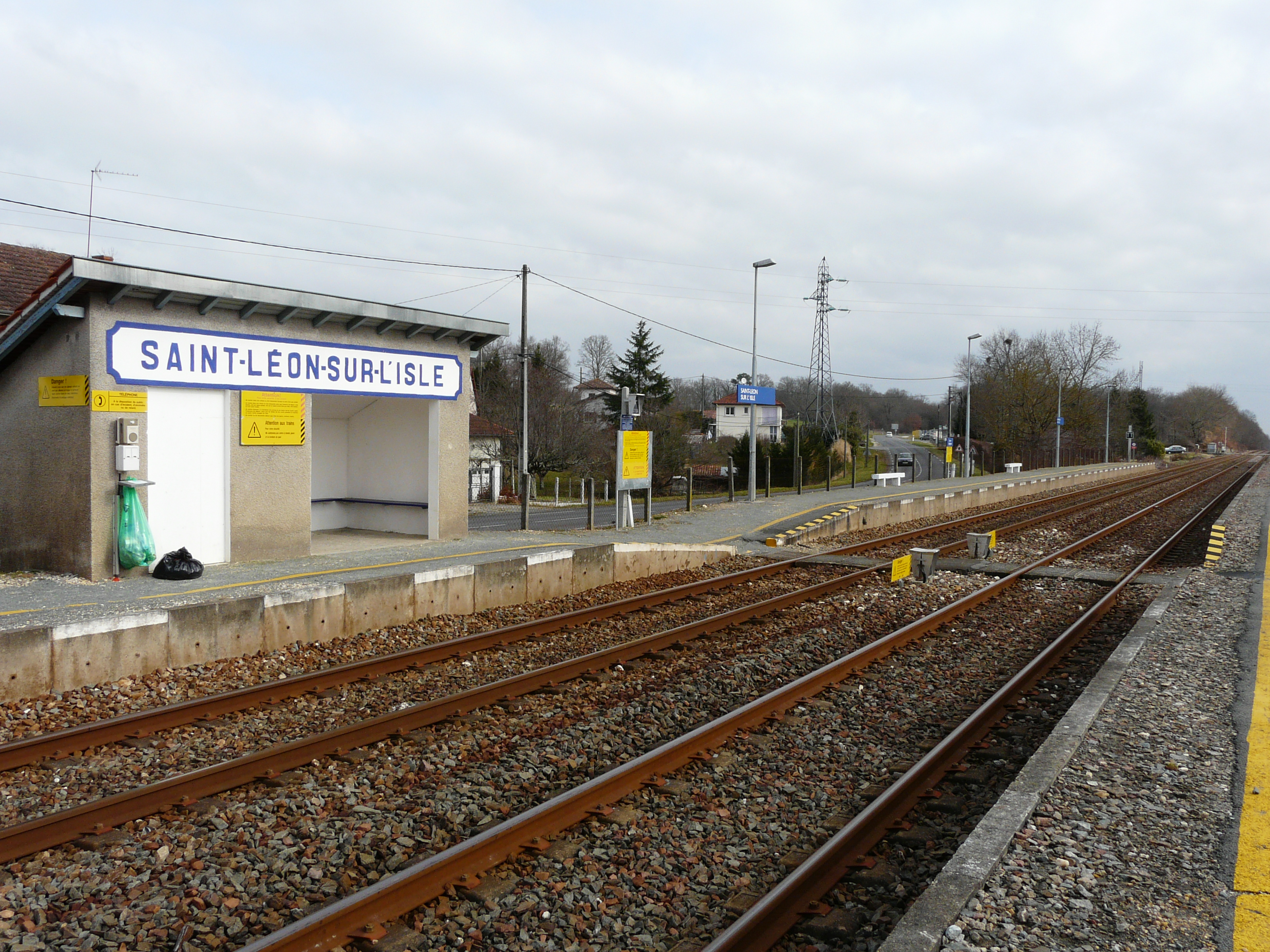
Gare de Saint-Léon

Saint-Léon-sur-l'Isle is a railway station in Saint-Léon-sur-l'Isle, Nouvelle-Aquitaine, France. The station is located on the Coutras - Tulle railway line. The station is served by TER (local) services operated by SNCF.

== Train services ==
The station is served by regional trains towards Bordeaux, Périgueux, Limoges and Brive-la-Gaillarde.

Preceding station	TER Nouvelle-Aquitaine	Following station
Neuvic towards Bordeaux	31	Saint-Astier towards Limoges
Neuvic towards Bordeaux	32	Saint-Astier towards Ussel
