= Saint-Seurin-sur-l'Isle station =

Railway station in Saint-Seurin-sur-l'Isle, France

Coordinates: 45°00′42″N 0°00′10″W

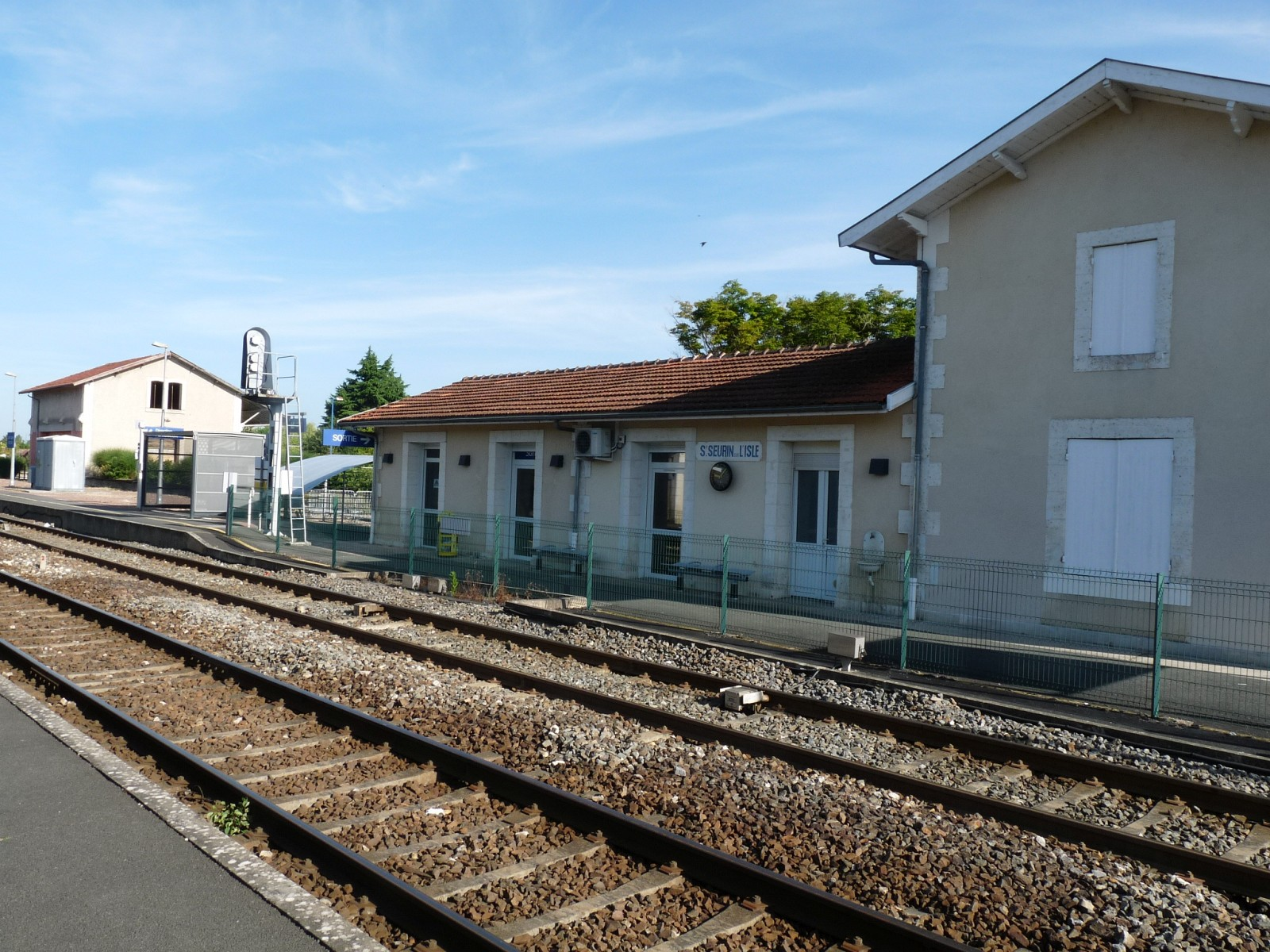
St seurin sur l'lsle station

Saint-Seurin-sur-l'Isle is a railway station in Saint-Seurin-sur-l'Isle, Nouvelle-Aquitaine, France. The station is located on the Coutras - Tulle railway line. The station is served by TER (local) services operated by SNCF.

== Train services ==
The station is served by regional trains towards Bordeaux, Périgueux, Limoges and Brive-la-Gaillarde.

Preceding station	TER Nouvelle-Aquitaine	Following station
Saint-Médard-de-Guizières towards Bordeaux	31	Montpon-Ménestérol towards Limoges
Saint-Médard-de-Guizières towards Bordeaux	32	Montpon-Ménestérol towards Ussel
