= Mussidan station =

Railway station in Mussidan, France

Coordinates: 45°02′05″N 0°21′11″E

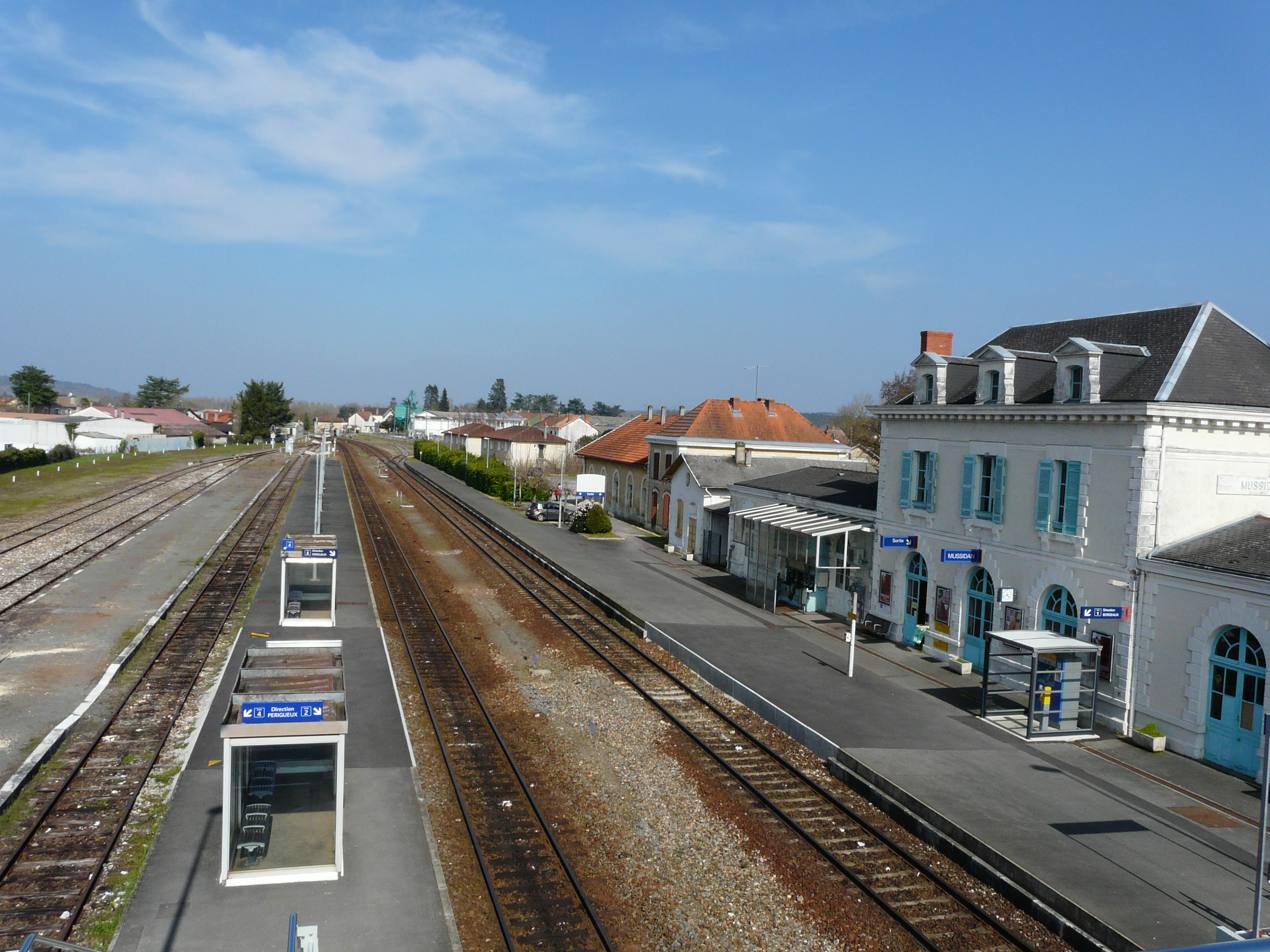
Mussidan station

Mussidan is a railway station in Mussidan, Nouvelle-Aquitaine, France. The station is located on the Coutras - Tulle railway line. The station is served by TER (local) services operated by SNCF.

== Train services ==
The station is served by regional trains to Bordeaux, Périgueux, Limoges and Brive-la-Gaillarde.

Preceding station	TER Nouvelle-Aquitaine	Following station
Montpon-Ménestérol towards Bordeaux	31	Neuvic towards Limoges
Montpon-Ménestérol towards Bordeaux	32	Neuvic towards Ussel
