= Gonthier =

Gonthier is a surname. Notable people with the surname include:

- Brigitte Gonthier-Maurin (born 1956), member of the Senate of France representing the Hauts-de-Seine department
- Charles Gonthier, CC (1928–2009), Puisne judge on the Supreme Court of Canada
- Charles Gonthier, Prince of Schwarzburg-Sondershausen (1830–1909), ruler of the principality of Schwarzburg-Sondershausen within the German Empire
- Dominique-Ceslas Gonthier (1853–1917), Canadian Roman Catholic priest, Dominican, author, and professor
- François-Pierre-Gonthier Maine de Biran (1766–1824), French philosopher
- Johanne Gonthier (born 1954), Quebec politician
- Linard Gonthier (1565–after 1642), glass painter who worked in Troyes, France
- Roger Gonthier (1884–1978), French architect in Limoges

== See also ==
- Gonthier Group SA, company that develops, markets, and provides Swiss annuities
- Reasons of the Supreme Court of Canada by Justice Gonthier
