= Gontier =

Gontier may refer to:

== Places ==
- Arrondissement of Château-Gontier, arrondissement of France, located in the Mayenne département, in the Pays de la Loire région
- Château-Gontier, commune in the Mayenne department in north-western France

== People ==
- Adam Gontier (born 1978), Canadian musician and songwriter
- Émile Gontier (1878–1947), French track and field athlete who competed at the 1900 Summer Olympics in Paris, France
- Gontier de Soignies, medieval trouvère and composer who was active from c. 1180 to 1220
- Jean Gontier (born 1942), Swiss fencer
- Nicole Gontier (born 1991), Italian biathlete

== See also ==
- Gonthier
