= Libourne station =

Railway station in Libourne, France

Libourne
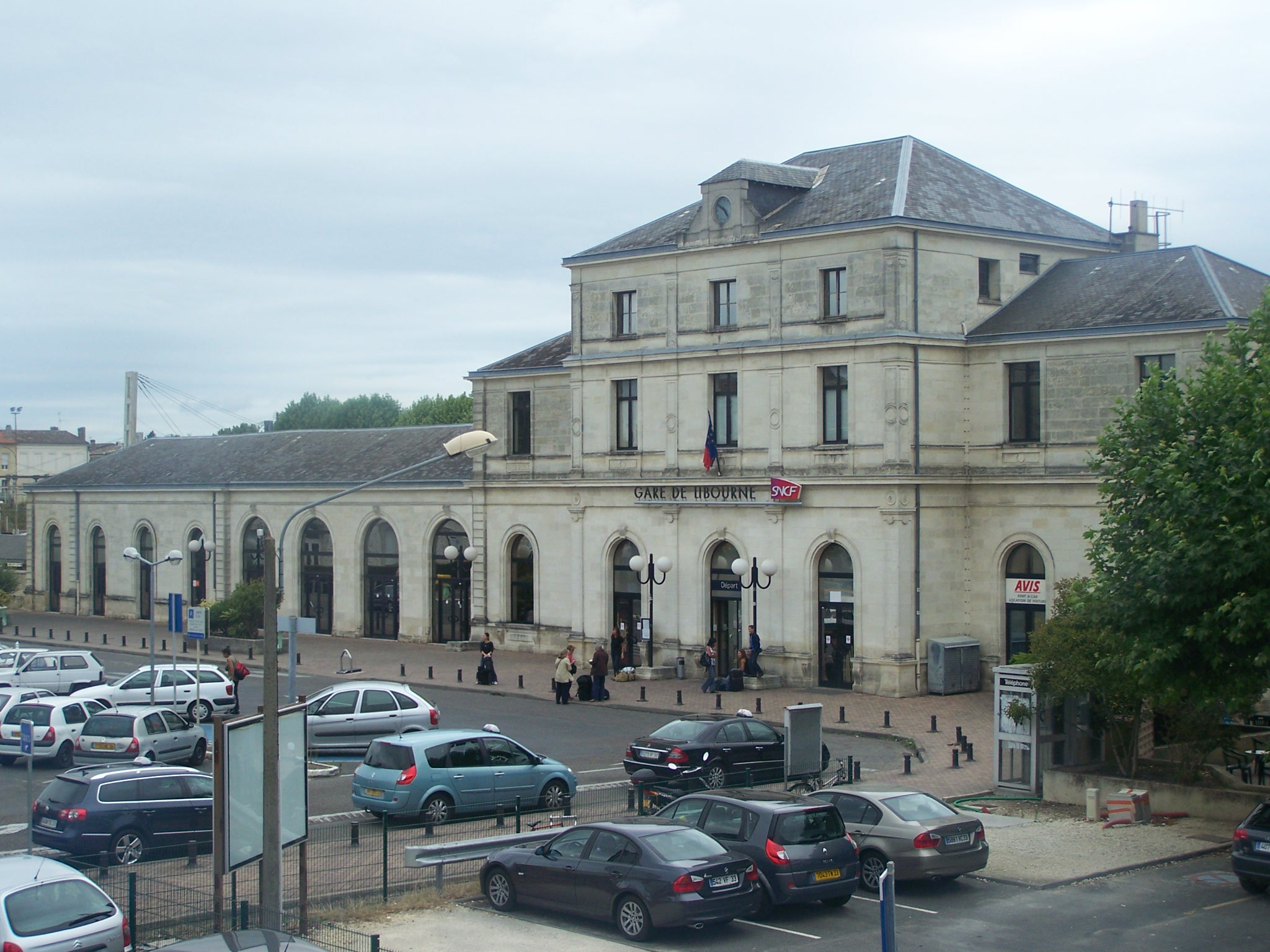
- The passenger building and station entrance

General information
- Location: 72 avenue Gallieni, 33500; Libourne; France
- Coordinates: 44.9158°N 0.2364°W
- Elevation: 15 m (49 ft)
- Owner: RFF / SNCF
- Operator: SNCF
- Lines: Paris–Bordeaux; Libourne–Buisson

Other information
- Station code: 87584052

History
- Opened: 30 September 1852

Passengers
- 2024: 1,942,950
Services
Preceding station	SNCF	Following station
Angoulême towards Montparnasse	TGV	Bordeaux Terminus
Preceding station	TER Nouvelle-Aquitaine	Following station
Bassens towards Bordeaux	13	Saint-Denis-de-Pile towards Angoulême
Cenon towards Bordeaux	31	Coutras towards Limoges
Cenon towards Bordeaux	32	Coutras towards Ussel
Cenon towards Bordeaux	33	Saint-Émilion towards Sarlat-la-Canéda
Vayres towards Bordeaux	41.1U	Saint-Denis-de-Pile towards Coutras
Location

The gare de Libourne is a railway interchange station in Libourne, Nouvelle-Aquitaine, France. The station is located on the Paris–Bordeaux, Bordeaux–Bergerac–Sarlat, Bordeaux–Coutras–Périgueux (Line 24 for Limoges and 25 for Brive) and Bordeaux–Angoulême railway lines. The station is served by TGV (high speed) Bordeaux–Paris Intercités Bordeaux–Périgueux–Tulle and to Montlucon via Limoges (long distance) and TER (local) services operated by SNCF.

== Train services ==
The following services currently call at Libourne:

- high speed services (TGV) Paris - Bordeaux - Irun
- high speed services (TGV) Paris - Bordeaux - Arcachon
- high speed services (TGV) Lille - Bordeaux
- local service (TER Nouvelle-Aquitaine) Bordeaux - Libourne - Angoulême
- local service (TER Nouvelle-Aquitaine) Bordeaux - Libourne - Périgueux - Limoges
- local service (TER Nouvelle-Aquitaine) Bordeaux - Libourne - Périgueux - Brive-la-Gaillarde - Ussel
- local service (TER Nouvelle-Aquitaine) Bordeaux - Libourne - Bergerac - Sarlat-la-Canéda

== Facilities ==
- 5 platforms, of which 4 in use
- Ticket Office
- Ticket Machines
- Car Park (Paid car park in the front and also at the side of the station and free parking on the other side of the railway line)
- Bus Services - Libus 1, 2 and 5
- Toilet
- Convenience shop/Small coffee shop called Casino Shop

== Gallery ==
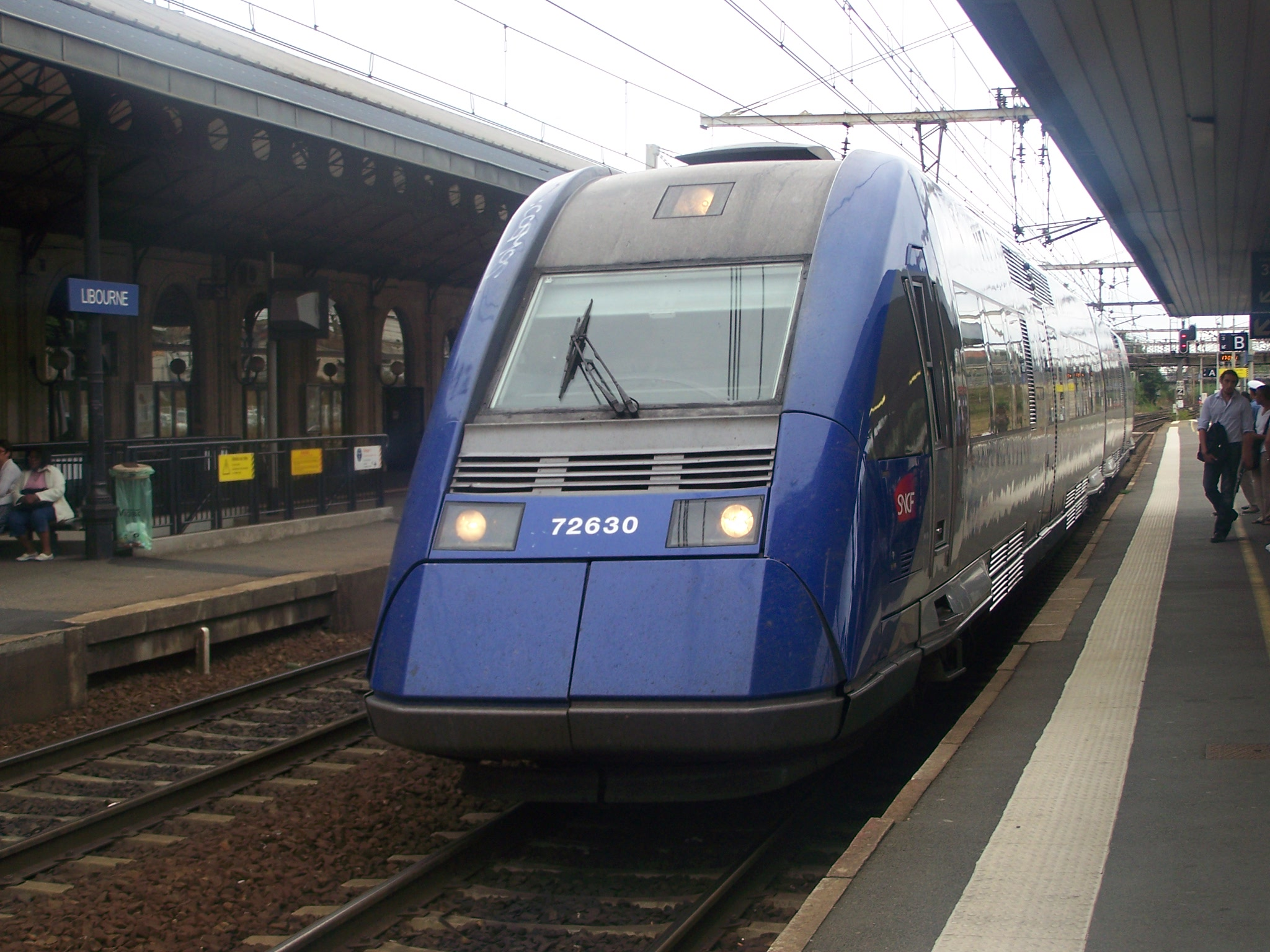
An X 72500 TER train arrives at Libourne on a Limoges - Bordeaux service

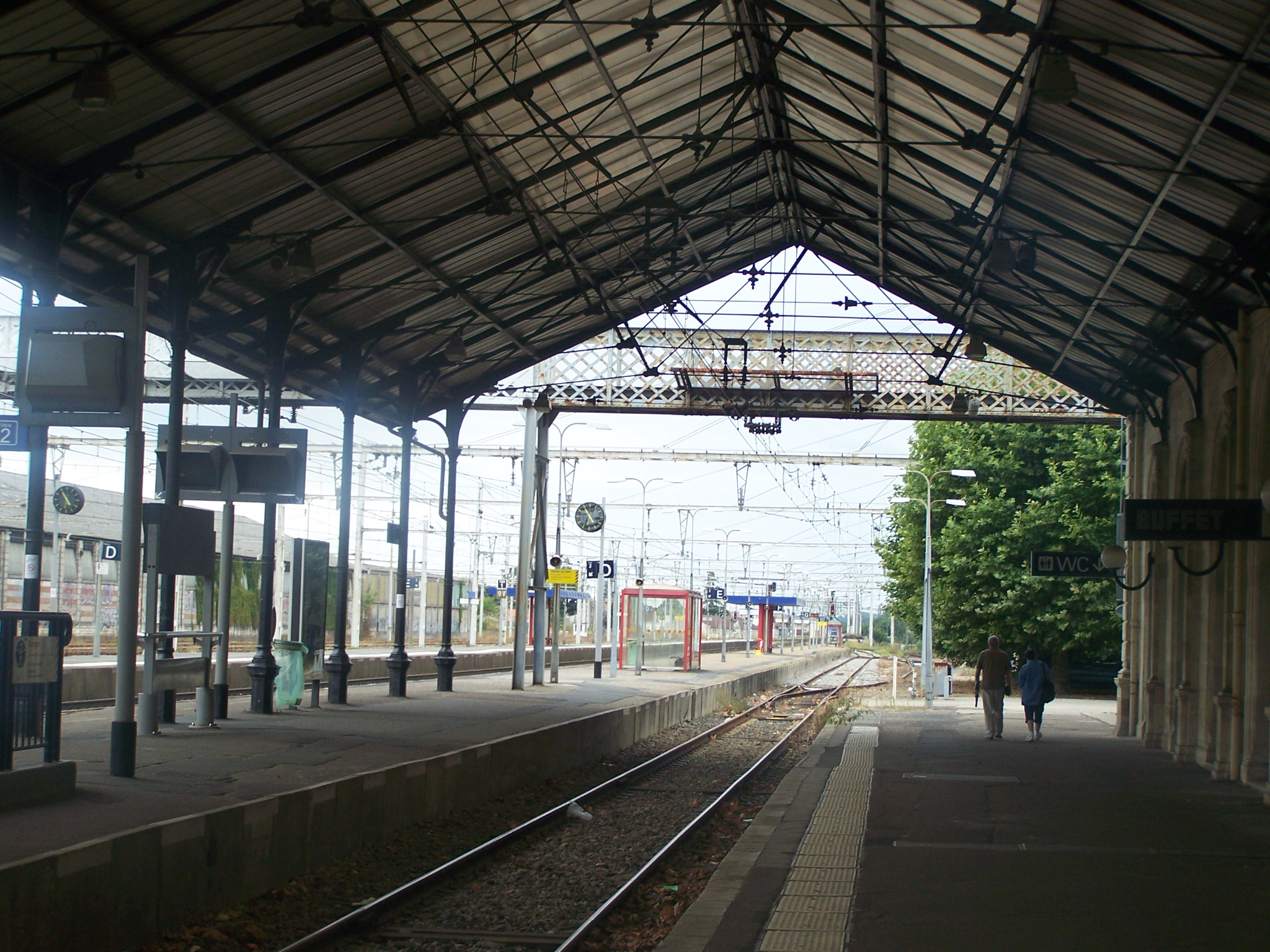
Libourne station
