= Mussidan =

- Commune
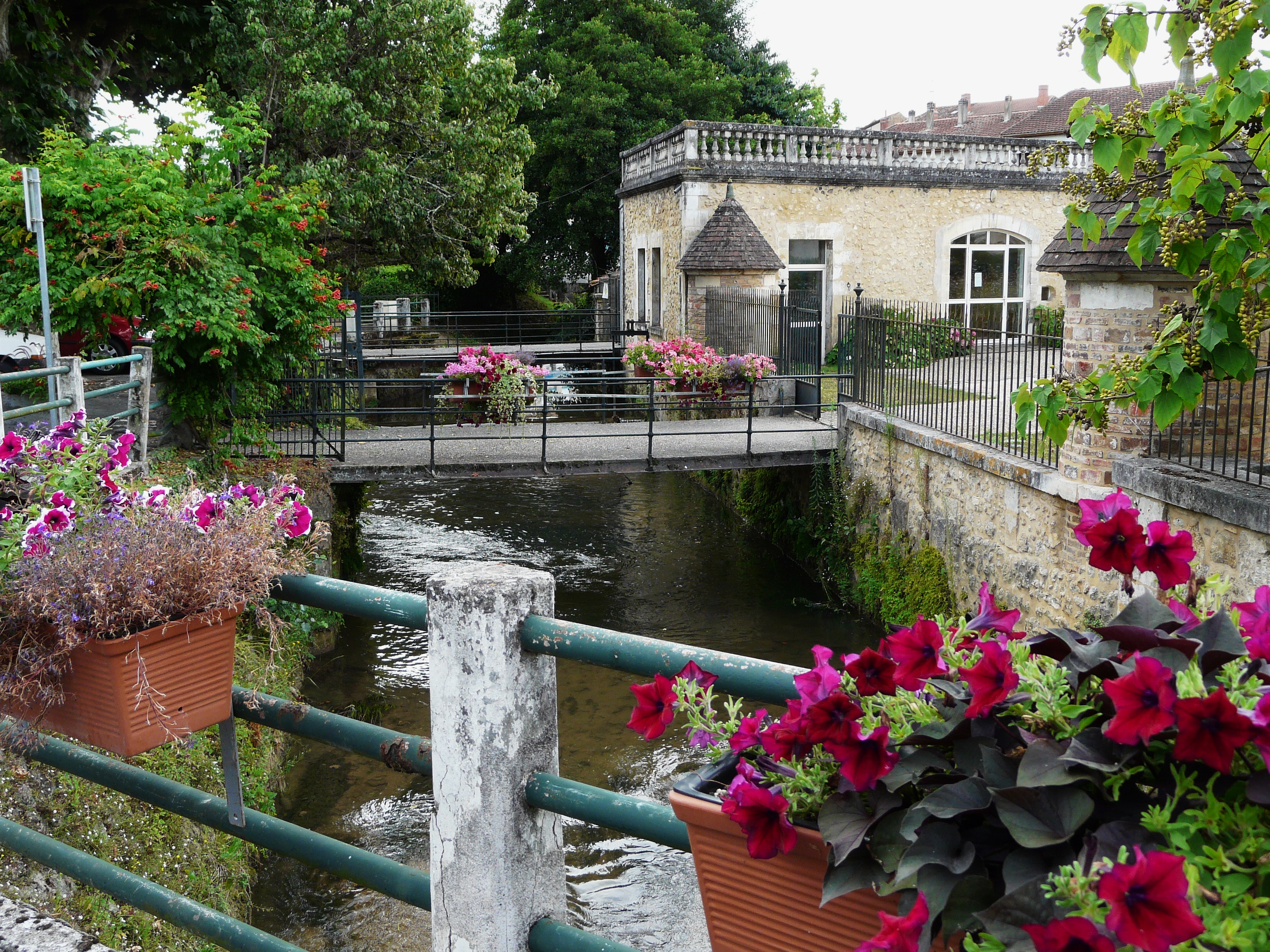
- Crempse River

- Coat of arms
- Location of Mussidan
- Location within France Location within Nouvelle-Aquitaine
- Coordinates: 45°02′09″N 0°21′59″E
- Country: France
- Region: Nouvelle-Aquitaine
- Department: Dordogne
- Arrondissement: Périgueux
- Canton: Vallée de l'Isle

Government
  - Mayor (2020–2026): Stéphane Triquart
- Area^{1}: 3.85 km^{2} (1.49 sq mi)
- Elevation: 50 m (160 ft)
- Highest elevation: 106 m (348 ft)
- Lowest elevation: 42 m (138 ft)
- Population (2023): 2,771
  - Density: 720/km^{2} (1,860/sq mi)
- Time zone: UTC+01:00 (CET)
  - Summer (DST): UTC+02:00 (CEST)
- INSEE/Postal code: 24299 /24400
- ^{1} French Land Register data, which excludes lakes, ponds, glaciers > 1 km^{2} (0.386 sq mi or 247 acres) and river estuaries.

Mussidan (French pronunciation: [mysidɑ̃]; Occitan: Moissida) is a commune in the Dordogne department in Nouvelle-Aquitaine in southwestern France. Mussidan station has rail connections to Bordeaux, Périgueux, Brive-la-Gaillarde and Limoges.

== History ==
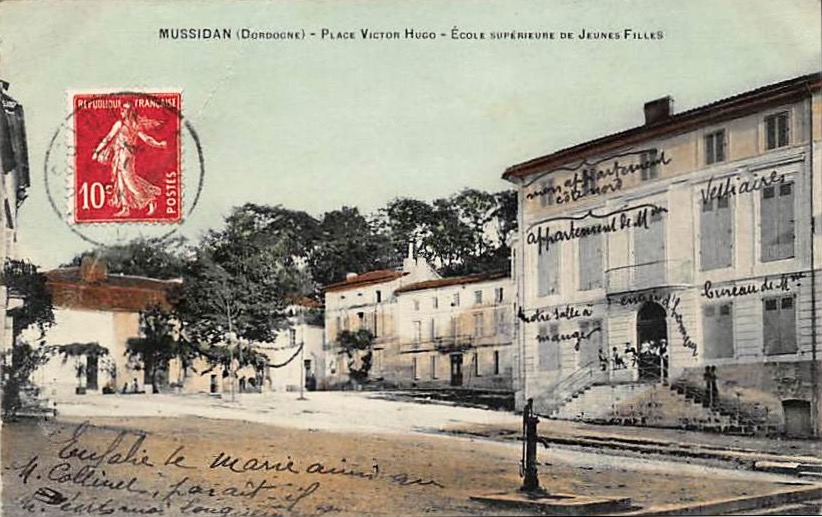
Former Higher primary school for girls

.

According to the *Black Book* of Saint-Florent de Saumur, in 1081, Alguier, a knight and lord of Mucidan [sic], donated the church of Saint-Pierre de Sorziac to the monastery of Saint-Florent de Saumur and the priory of Montcarret. Shortly thereafter, he dispossessed the monks of Saint-Florent of the said church in order to donate it to Fulcrade and the religious community of Charroux.

From at least the first half of the 13th century, the lords of *Mucidan* belonged to the Montaut family (starting with Raimond I de Montaut—though the precise origins of these *Montauts* cannot be determined). By the following generation, this line merged into the Castillon family through the marriage of Raimond's daughter, Mathe de Montaut, to Guillaume-Amanieu de Castillon d'Eauzan (died c. 1302); the Castillon family subsequently adopted the name *Montaut de Mussidan* and is considered a cadet branch of the Viscounts of Castillon. The son of Mathe and Guillaume-Amanieu, Raimond I (or II), married Faïs de Gontaut of Badefol; their issue included: Auger (d. 1360)—also "Prince" of Blaye in 1356 via an exchange with King Edward III and Lord of Aubeterre by grant from the said English king in 1357; husband (in 1330) of Régine de Salviac and father of Raimond II (or III) de Montaut-Mussidan "Castillon" (born c. 1335, d. 1406; also Lord or "Prince" of Montendre, Montguyon, Blaye, and Aubeterre; husband (in 1365) of Marguerite d'Albret, daughter of Bérard I de Vayres, Lord of Vayres and Verteuil, and of Guiraude de Gironde). Their eldest daughter, Rosine de Montaut, passed Montendre, Montguyon, and Mussidan to her husband, Guy II de La Rochefoucauld-Verteuil-Barbezieux, whom she married in 1382.

The La Rochefoucauld family held Mussidan until around 1500, after which it passed to the Gramont family (Jean I de Gramont, c. 1375–1429, having married Marie de Montaut-Mussidan, the youngest daughter of Raimond II and Marguerite d'Albret; the second daughter, Mathe de Montaut, had married Nicolas Roger de Beaufort). Mussidan subsequently passed to the Caumont La Force family—notably Henri-Jacques Nompar de Caumont—remaining with them until the Revolution.

The siege of the town is mentioned in Montaigne's *Essays* (1569).

The spelling "Mucidan" appears on the Cassini map, which depicts France between 1756 and 1789.

The town served as the administrative center of the Mussidan district from 1790 to 1800.

An initial wooden bridge was built across the Isle River in 1840.

== Roundup of 16 January 1944 ==
On 16 January 1944, 35 hostages were arrested by the Germans for acts of resistance. They were deported to German work camps.

== Battle and executions of 11 June 1944 ==
On 11 June 1944 Francs-Tireurs et Partisans destroyed a German armoured train at Mussidan station. During the fight, eight guerrillas and the train guard were killed. At the same time a convoy of the 11th Panzer Division of the Wehrmacht arrived from Bordeaux. The guerrillas were obliged to withdraw. As a reprisal, a detachment of the Gestapo from Périgueux led by Second Lieutenant Michaël Hambrecht, reinforced by a platoon led by Alexandre Villaplane, head of one of the five sections of the North African Brigade and former captain of the France football team at the 1930 World Cup in Uruguay, 350 men over the age of sixteen from the city and its surroundings were arrested. The village was plundered by the North Africans. In the evening, 47 civilians were shot near the town hall; five others were massacred in the street, including Raoul Grassin, the mayor of the town, and a councillor. Eight boys were under 18. Only two people survived despite their serious injuries. The Mussidan massacre constitutes the largest massacre of civilians committed in the Dordogne during the Second World War, the tenth largest in France. 115 inhabitants were deported.

These sufferings earned Mussidan the award of the 1939-1945 war cross on 11 November 1948, a distinction also awarded to eighteen other municipalities in the Dordogne.

== Population ==
Historical population

Year	Pop.	±% p.a.
1793	1,286	—
1800	1,176	−1.27%
1806	1,411	+3.08%
1821	1,630	+0.97%
1831	1,700	+0.42%
1836	1,953	+2.81%
1841	1,744	−2.24%
1846	1,862	+1.32%
1851	1,919	+0.60%
1856	2,028	+1.11%
1861	1,917	−1.12%
1866	2,070	+1.55%
1872	1,980	−0.74%
1876	2,062	+1.02%
1881	2,025	−0.36%
1886	2,037	+0.12%
1891	2,206	+1.61%
1896	2,215	+0.08%
1901	2,284	+0.62%

Year	Pop.	±% p.a.
1906	2,350	+0.57%
1911	2,416	+0.56%
1921	2,453	+0.15%
1926	2,449	−0.03%
1931	2,416	−0.27%
1936	2,653	+1.89%
1946	3,018	+1.30%
1954	3,006	−0.05%
1962	3,024	+0.07%
1968	3,048	+0.13%
1975	3,235	+0.85%
1982	3,236	+0.00%
1990	2,985	−1.00%
1999	2,843	−0.54%
2007	2,823	−0.09%
2012	2,908	+0.60%
2017	2,710	−1.40%
2023	2,771	+0.37%

Source: EHESS and INSEE (1968-2023)

== International relations ==
It is twinned with:

- Woodbridge, Suffolk, England
- Vigy, France; since 1990

== See also ==
- Communes of the Dordogne department
