= Montpon-Ménestérol =

- Commune
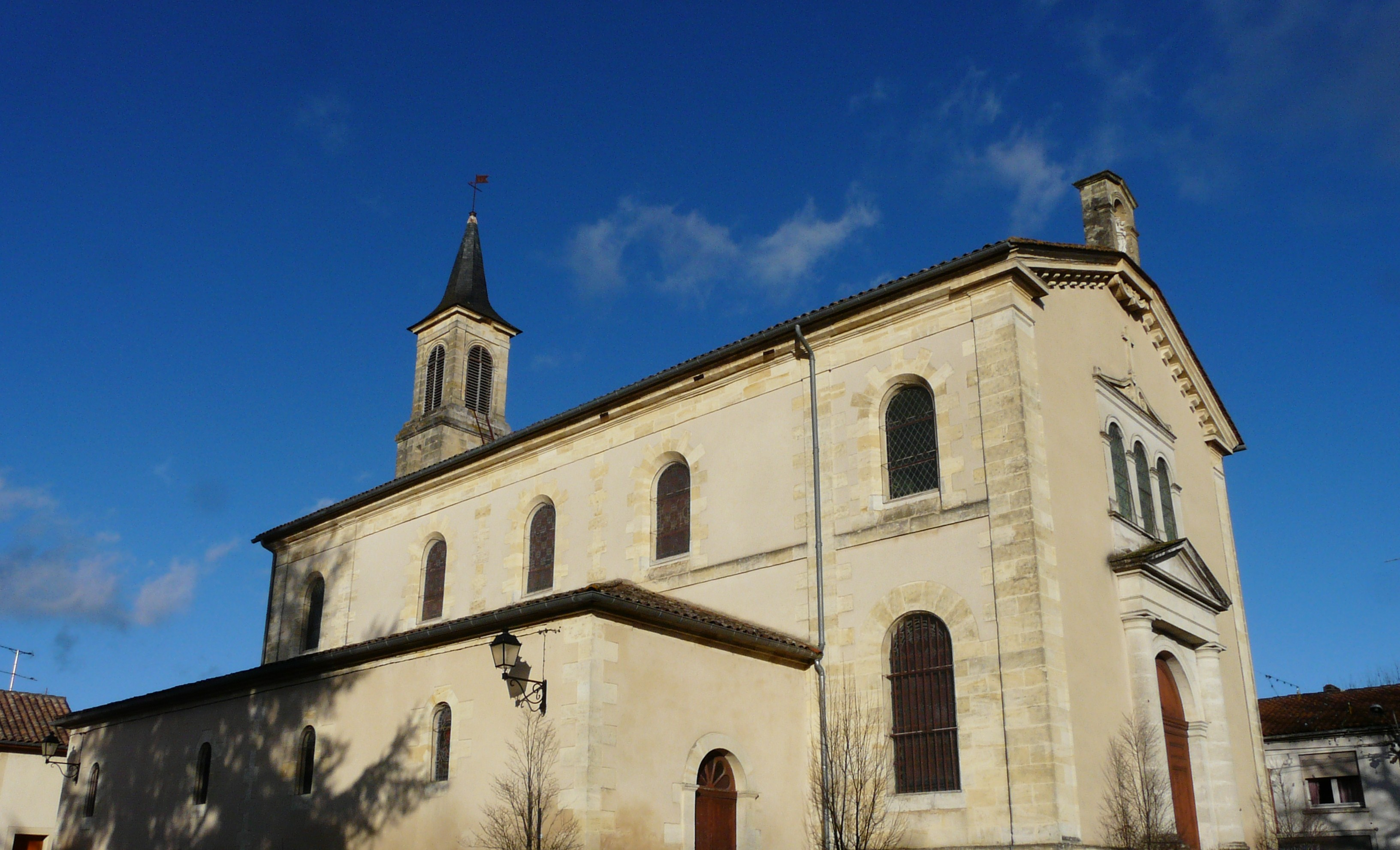
- The church in Montpon

- Coat of arms
- Location of Montpon-Ménestérol
- Location within France Location within Nouvelle-Aquitaine
- Coordinates: 45°01′N 0°10′E
- Country: France
- Region: Nouvelle-Aquitaine
- Department: Dordogne
- Arrondissement: Périgueux
- Canton: Montpon-Ménestérol

Government
  - Mayor (2020–2026): Rozenn Rouiller
- Area^{1}: 46.34 km^{2} (17.89 sq mi)
- Elevation: 43 m (141 ft)
- Highest elevation: 130 m (430 ft)
- Lowest elevation: 22 m (72 ft)
- Population (2023): 5,866
  - Density: 126.6/km^{2} (327.9/sq mi)
- Time zone: UTC+01:00 (CET)
  - Summer (DST): UTC+02:00 (CEST)
- INSEE/Postal code: 24294 /24700
- ^{1} French Land Register data, which excludes lakes, ponds, glaciers > 1 km^{2} (0.386 sq mi or 247 acres) and river estuaries.

Montpon-Ménestérol (French pronunciation: [mɔ̃pɔ̃ menɛsteʁɔl]; Occitan: Montpaun e Menestairòu) is a commune in the Dordogne department in Nouvelle-Aquitaine in southwestern France. The commune was created in February 1965 by the merger of the former communes Montpon-sur-l'Isle and Ménestérol-Montignac. Montpon-Ménestérol station has rail connections to Bordeaux, Périgueux, Brive-la-Gaillarde and Limoges.

== Population ==
The population data given in the table below for 1962 and earlier refer to the former commune of Montpon-sur-l'Isle.

Historical population

Year	Pop.	±% p.a.
1793	1,304	—
1800	1,500	+2.02%
1806	1,460	−0.45%
1821	1,295	−0.80%
1831	1,325	+0.23%
1836	1,429	+1.52%
1841	1,530	+1.38%
1846	1,664	+1.69%
1851	1,564	−1.23%
1856	1,803	+2.88%
1861	1,914	+1.20%
1866	2,060	+1.48%
1872	2,012	−0.39%
1876	2,241	+2.73%
1881	2,231	−0.09%
1886	2,385	+1.34%
1891	2,254	−1.12%
1896	2,243	−0.10%
1901	2,486	+2.08%

Year	Pop.	±% p.a.
1906	2,379	−0.88%
1911	2,397	+0.15%
1921	2,274	−0.53%
1926	2,460	+1.58%
1931	2,515	+0.44%
1936	2,634	+0.93%
1946	2,837	+0.75%
1954	2,818	−0.08%
1962	3,220	+1.68%
1968	5,863	+10.50%
1975	5,939	+0.18%
1982	5,742	−0.48%
1990	5,481	−0.58%
1999	5,385	−0.20%
2007	5,667	+0.64%
2012	5,482	−0.66%
2017	5,498	+0.06%
2023	5,866	+1.09%

Source: EHESS and INSEE (1968–2023)

== See also ==
- Communes of the Dordogne department
