= Bègles station =

Railway station in Bègles, France

Coordinates: 44°47′57″N 0°33′16″W

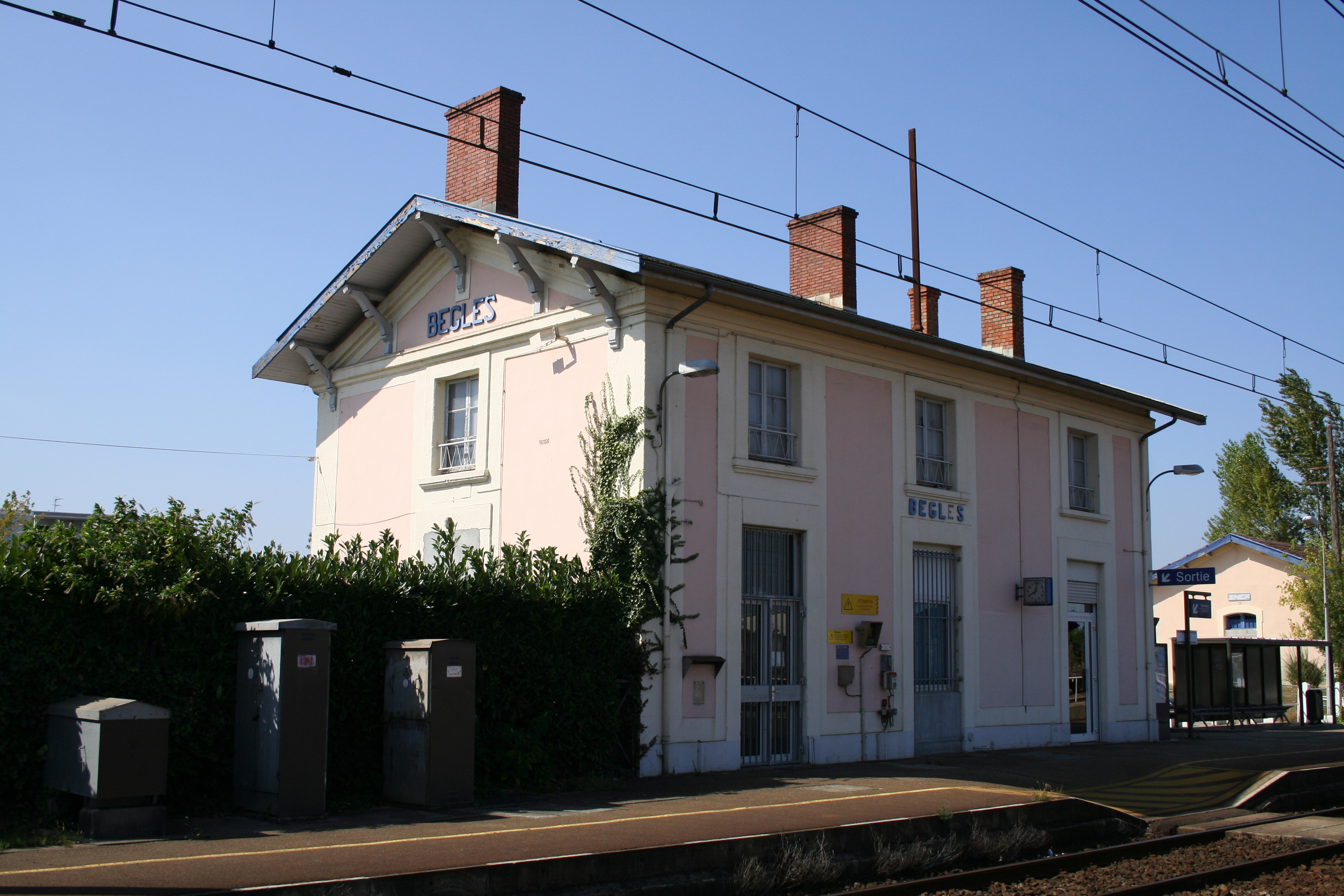
Bègles station

Bègles is a railway station in the Bègles, a suburb of Bordeaux, Nouvelle-Aquitaine, France. The station is located on the Bordeaux–Sète railway line. The station is served by TER (local) services operated by SNCF.

== Train services ==
The following services currently call at Bègles:

- Local service (TER Nouvelle-Aquitaine) Bordeaux - Langon

| Preceding station | TER Nouvelle-Aquitaine | Following station |
|---|---|---|
| Bordeaux Terminus | 43.2U | Villenave-d'Ornon towards Langon |

== See also ==
- B81693 at Bègles
- Z7323 at Bègles
- Infra Loco on a passing freight
