= Roger Gonthier =

French architect (1884–1978)

Limoges: Gare des Bénédictins by Roger Gonthier

Roger Gonthier (French pronunciation: [ʁɔʒe ɡɔ̃tje]; 1884–1978) was a 20th-century French architect, whose major works were in Limoges, France. He worked within the Compagnie du Paris-Orléans architectural practice.

At the start of the 20th century, Limoges was expanding, and there was a revival in the construction of new public buildings. Gonthier designed the Gare de Limoges-Bénédictins (railway station) in 1917. One of the last great monumental train stations in France, it was built between 1927 and 1929. The station remains a landmark building within the city, and has been listed since 1975.

Gonthier also designed the Pavillon du Verdurier, the municipal slaughterhouse, the Cité-jardin de Beaublanc, and the Cité des Coutures.
