= Dominique-Ceslas Gonthier =

Canadian priest

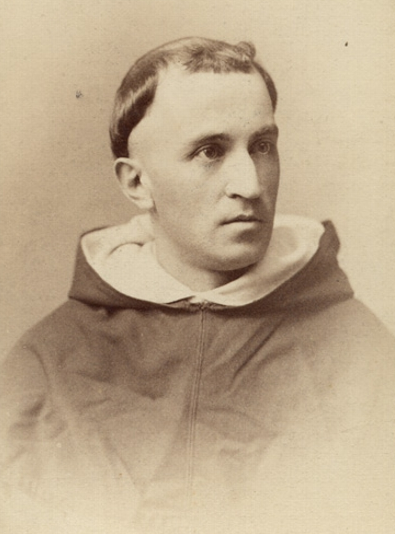
- Born: 22 September 1853; Saint-Gervais, Lower Canada
- Died: 16 June 1917 (aged 63); Saint-Hyacinthe, Quebec

Dominique-Ceslas Gonthier (22 September 1853 – 16 June 1917) was a Canadian Roman Catholic priest, Dominican, author, and professor.
