= Angoulême station =

Railway station in Angoulême, France

Angoulême
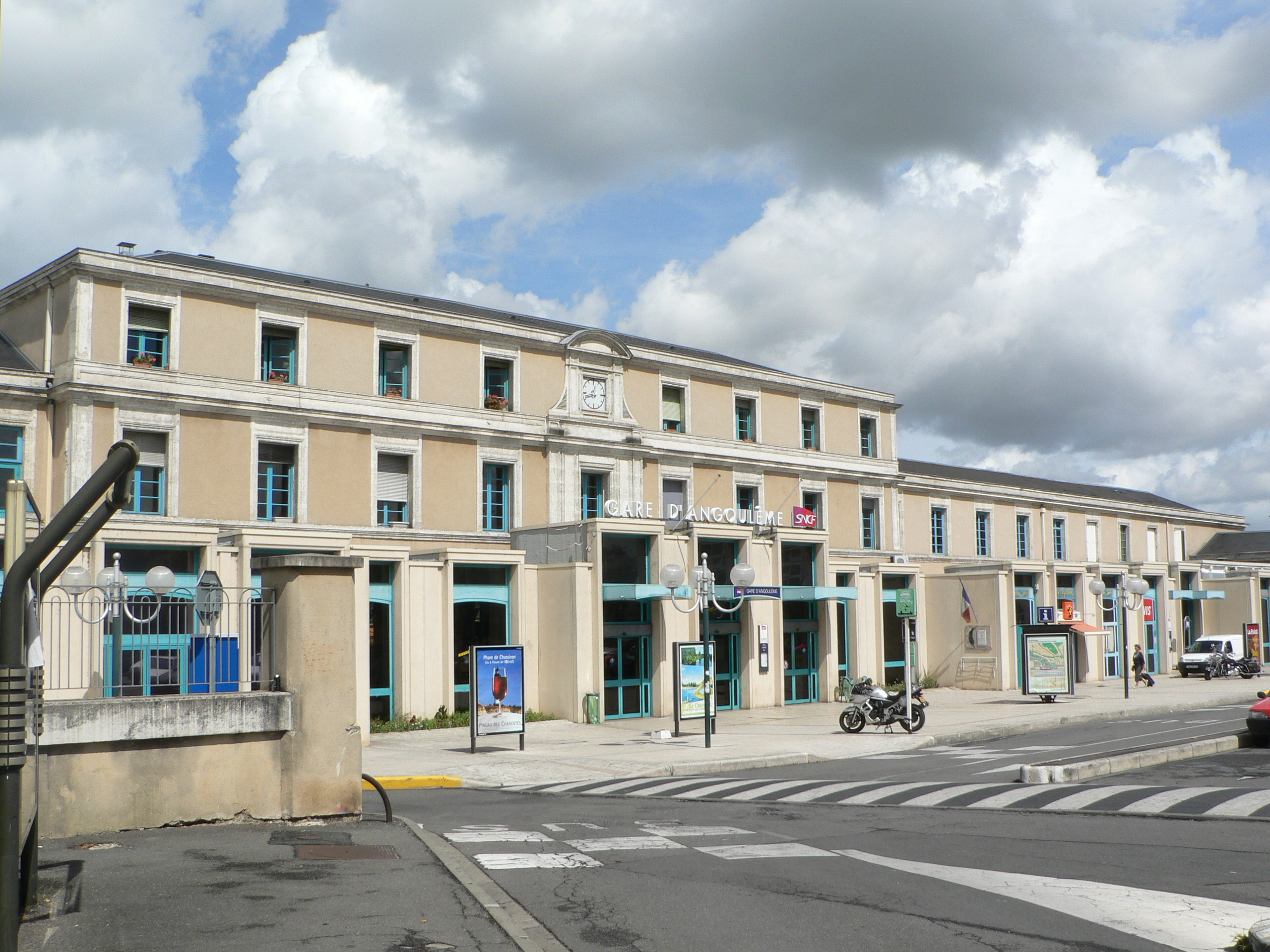
- Angoulême railway station

General information
- Location: Angoulême, Charente, Nouvelle-Aquitaine, France
- Coordinates: 45°39′15″N 0°9′55″E
- Lines: Paris–Bordeaux railway; Saintes-Angoulême railway; Limoges-Angoulême railway
- Platforms: 6

History
- Opened: 20 September 1852

Passengers
- 2024: 2,341,350
Services
Preceding station	SNCF	Following station
Poitiers towards Montparnasse	TGV	Libourne towards Bordeaux
Preceding station	TER Nouvelle-Aquitaine	Following station
Luxé towards Poitiers	12	Terminus
Montmoreau towards Bordeaux	13	Terminus
Châteauneuf-sur-Charente towards Royan	16	Terminus
Ruelle-sur-Touvre towards Limoges	18	Terminus
Preceding station	Ouigo	Following station
Poitiers towards Tourcoing	Grande Vitesse	Bordeaux Terminus
Location

Angoulême station (French: Gare d'Angoulême) is a railway station located in Angoulême, Charente, south-western France. The station was opened in 1852 and is located on the Paris–Bordeaux railway, Saintes-Angoulême railway and Limoges-Angoulême railway. The train services are operated by SNCF.

The station building is part of the former Collège Royal de la Marine, as testified by an enamel plaque in the booking hall.

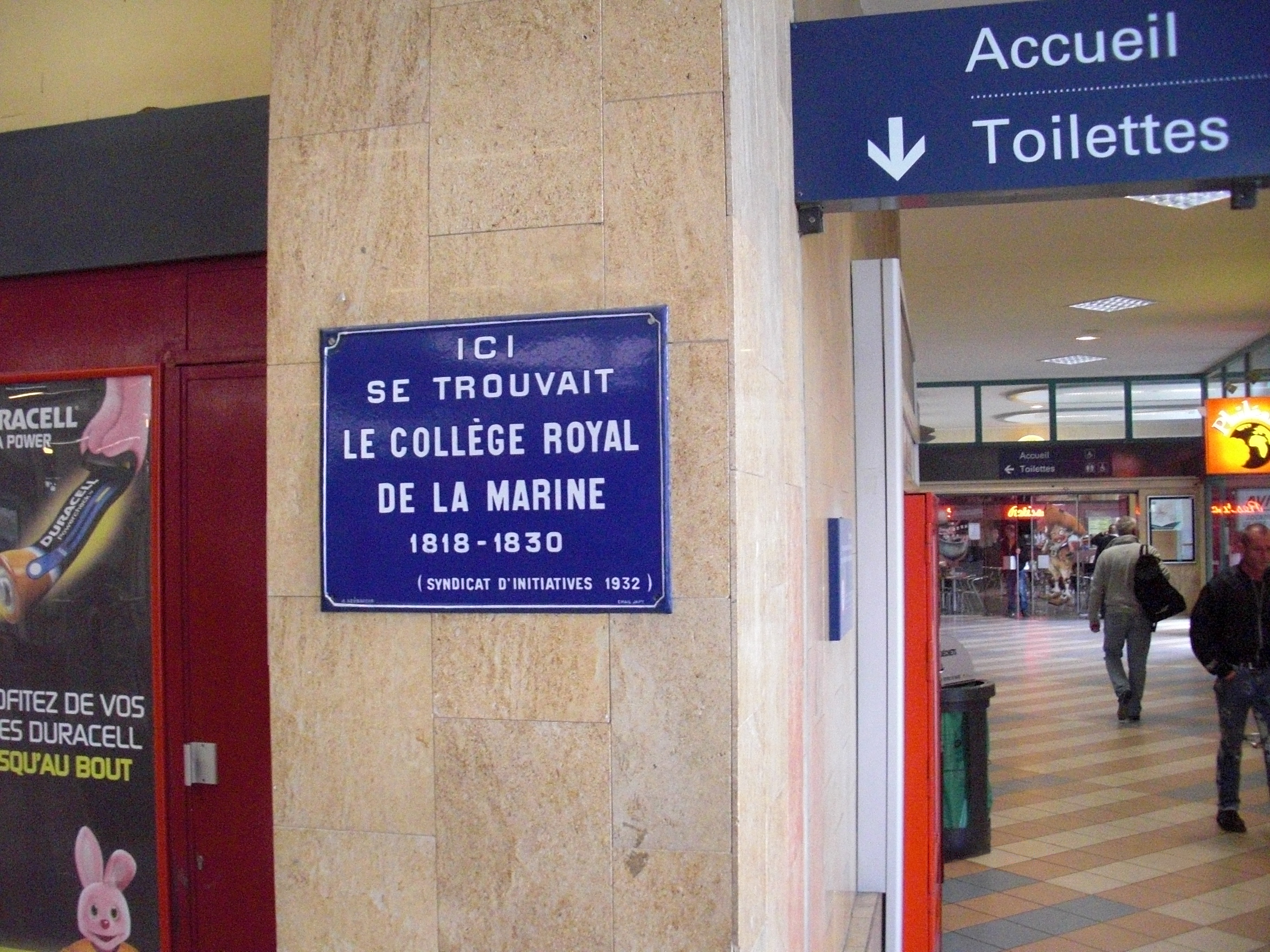
Enamel panel in booking hall proclaiming the former site of the royal naval college

== Train services ==
The following services call at Angoulême:

- High speed services (TGV) Paris - Tours - Poitiers - Bordeaux
- High speed services (TGV) Lille - Aeroport CDG - Tours - Poitiers - Bordeaux
- High speed services (TGV) (Freiburg (Breisgau)) - Strasbourg - Aeroport CDG - Tours - Poitiers - Bordeaux
- Local services (TER Nouvelle-Aquitaine) Bordeaux - Libourne - Angoulême
- Local services (TER Nouvelle-Aquitaine) Angoulême - Poitiers
- Local services (TER Nouvelle-Aquitaine) La Rochelle - Rochefort - Saintes - Cognac - Angoulême
- Local services (TER Nouvelle-Aquitaine) Royan - Saintes - Cognac - Angoulême
- Local services (TER Nouvelle-Aquitaine) Angoulême - Limoges

== Bus services ==
- Angoulême - Barbezieux - Jonzac - Pons

== See also ==
- List of SNCF stations in Nouvelle-Aquitaine
