= Gonthier Group SA =

Swiss annuities company

- Founded: February 8, 1983; 43 years ago
- Headquarters: Montreux, Switzerland

Gonthier Group SA is a Swiss developer, marketer, and provider of annuities. Founded in 1983 and incorporated in 2008 by Pierre-André Gonthier, the company is one of the first companies to take Swiss annuities to the international market. According to the Swiss Annuity Consumer Bureau, it is the world's largest provider of Swiss annuities.

The group is headquartered in Montreux, Switzerland.
