= LGV Poitiers–Limoges =

Proposed French high-speed railway

The LGV Poitiers–Limoges was an approximately 100 km-long (62 mi) French high-speed rail project reserved for passenger traffic between Poitiers and Limoges. It was considered since 1990's, with a serious project studied and revealed in 2006. This high-speed rail was planned to be mostly single track only.

Its dual aim was:

- to ensure high-speed service of the Limoges region by extending the LGV Sud Europe Atlantique. This would make a journey time between Paris and Limoges of about 2 hours possible.
- to link Poitiers and Limoges in 40 minutes.

Construction was due to start in 2014 but had been brought back to beyond 2030. The project was finally cancelled in 2017, under the new administration of President Emmanuel Macron.
