= Brive-la-Gaillarde station =

Railway station in Brive-la-Gaillarde, France

Brive-la-Gaillarde
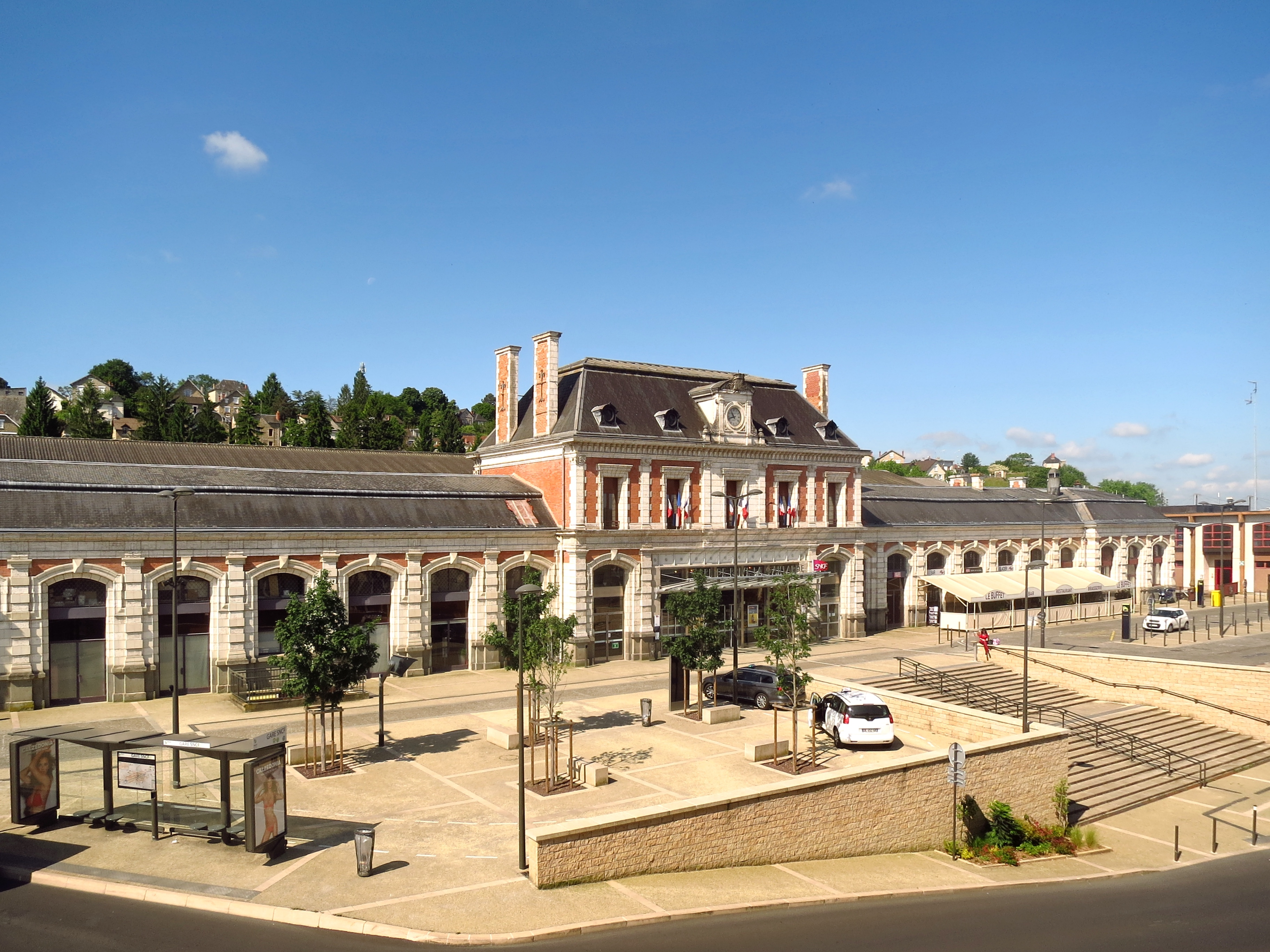
- Brive-la-Gaillarde railway station

General information
- Location: Brive-la-Gaillarde, Corrèze, Nouvelle-Aquitaine, France
- Coordinates: 45°9′9″N 1°31′42″E
- Lines: Orléans–Montauban railway Coutras–Tulle railway Brive-Toulouse (via Capdenac); Nexon-Brive railway

Other information
- Station code: 87594002

History
- Opened: 17 September 1860

Passengers
- 2024: 1,269,198
Services
Preceding station	SNCF	Following station
Uzerche towards Paris-Austerlitz	Intercités	Souillac towards Toulouse
Preceding station	TER Nouvelle-Aquitaine	Following station
Allassac towards Limoges	22	Terminus
Varetz towards Limoges	23	Terminus
Terminus	27	Aubazine-Saint-Hilaire towards Ussel
La Rivière-de-Mansac towards Bordeaux	32	Aubazine-Saint-Hilaire towards Ussel
Preceding station	TER Auvergne-Rhône-Alpes	Following station
Terminus	67	Turenne towards Aurillac
Preceding station	TER Occitanie	Following station
Terminus	7	Turenne towards Rodez
Terminus	19	Gignac-Cressensac towards Toulouse
Location

Brive-la-Gaillarde is a railway station serving the town of Brive-la-Gaillarde, Nouvelle-Aquitaine, France. The station opened on 17 September 1860 and is located on the Orléans–Montauban railway, Coutras–Tulle railway, Brive-Toulouse (via Capdenac) railway and Nexon-Brive railway.

The station is served by the Intercités avec réservation obligatoire (Intercity), Intercités sans réservation obligatoire (long distance) and TER (local) services operated by SNCF. It is an important railway junction, with lines towards Périgueux, Limoges via Saint-Yrieix, Limoges via Uzerche, Ussel, Aurillac, Rodez and Montauban.

== History ==
The Brive railway station was commissioned on 17 September 1860 by the Compagnie du chemin de fer de Paris à Orléans (PO), when it opened to operate the Périgueux to Brive section. It is built on the southern edge of the town of Brive. The first train, with authorities, arrived on 31 August 1860 while the station was still under construction and the official opening took place on Sunday 30 September 1860. A ceremony and festivities occurred at the station and in the city, on a platform installed in the centre of the station with speeches from officials including the Prefect and Barthélemy Eyrolles, mayor of Brive, before a blessing by the bishop of Tulle, in front of an estimated crowd of 20,000 people. That same year there were eight railway men employed on the station site, which included a modest building built of a wood frame and bricks. On 10 November 1862, the company commissioned the next section, Brive to Capdenac.

Brive became a branch station with the opening of the Brive line to Tulle on 28 August 1871 by the PO Company. As the original station building was not large enough, the company decided to dismantle it and transfer it to Rocamadour and build a new, larger stone and brick building with a metal canopy. It completed the site construction with, to the west towards Périgueux, a depot designed for twelve locomotives. The company completed its network with the commissioning of the Brive line to Nexon on 20 December 1875. The early 1890s marked the end of the extension of the stations with the commissioning, again by the PO Company, of a line from Brive to Souillac on 1 June 1891, and from Limoges to Brive via Uzerche on 1 July 1893.

In 2013, Brive railway station underwent a number of renovations and redevelopments to improve its role as a "multimodal hub". The Northern forecourt was completely redesigned with the installation of car drop-off zones, a bus station, taxi lanes and bike parking. The underground subway was extended so that it serves the Southern forecourt (the redesigned forecourt which becomes a second entrance/exit). Accessibility is also improved with the installation of lifts to access the platforms, the renovation of the bridge with the installation of lifts at both ends, the change of signage in the station, the installation of new electronic information screens (one in the lobby, one on the Northern Forecourt and two on the Southern Forecourt), the installation of tactile paving and strips on the platform's and the installation of guard railings with indications for pathways and steps on the stairs.

In 2017, according to SNCF estimates, the station's annual traffic was 748,463 passengers.

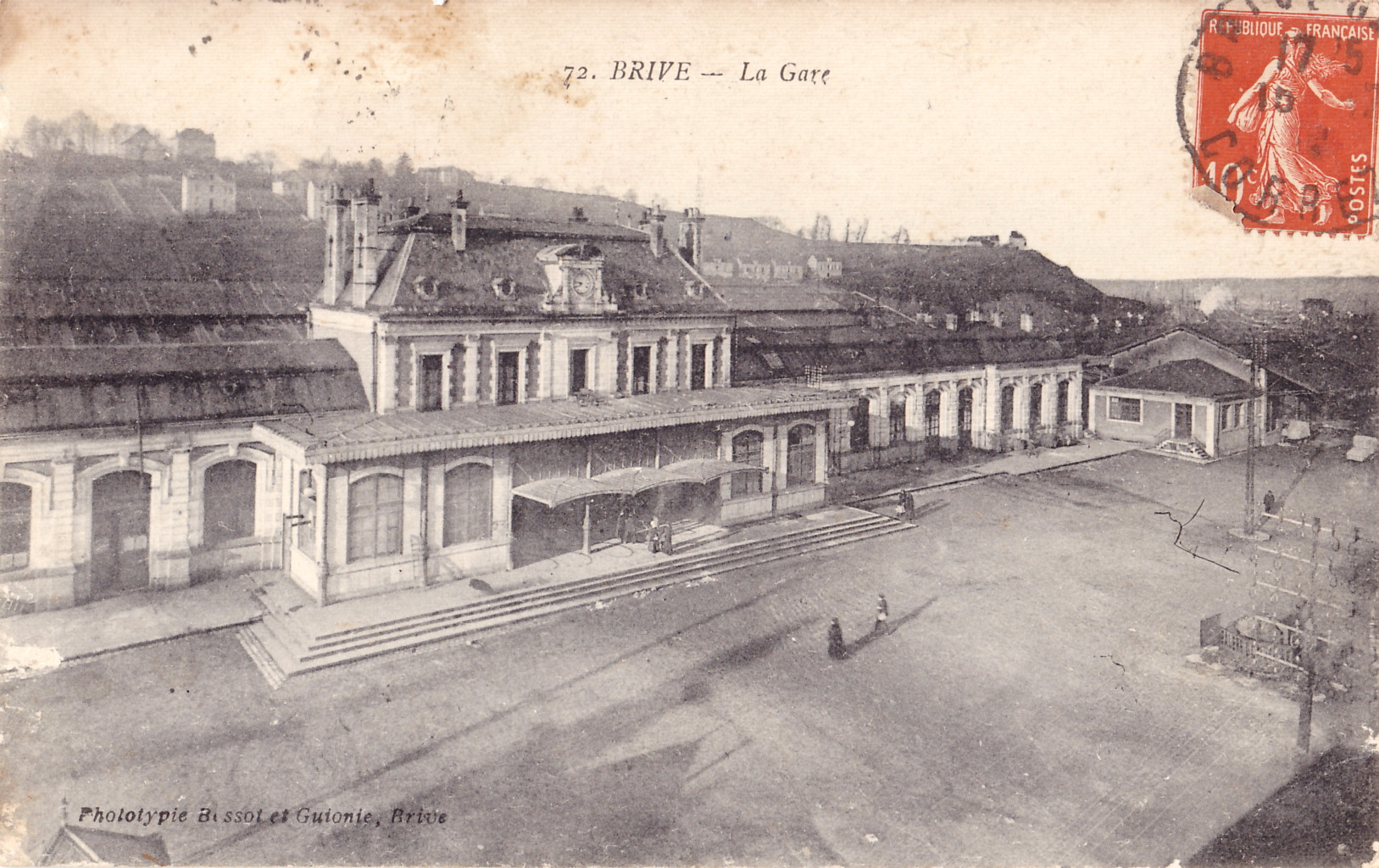
Around 1910

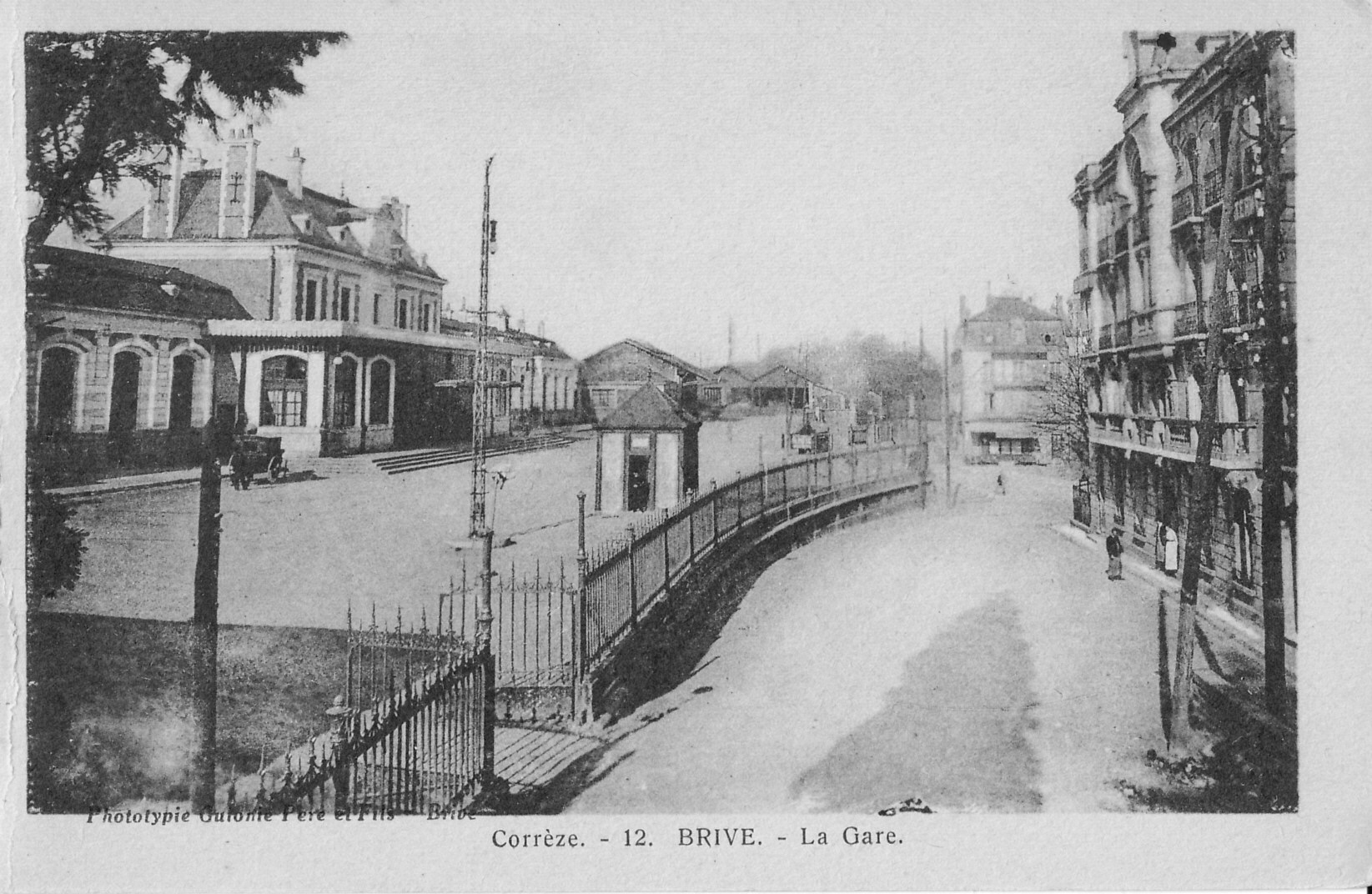
Around 1920

== Services for travellers ==
=== Station ===
The SNCF station has a passenger building, with ticket offices open daily. It is also equipped with automated kiosks for the purchase of tickets. Known as a Access plus station, facilities, equipment and services are available to people with reduced mobility. An underground subway, accessed by stairs and lifts allows one to cross the tracks and access to the platforms.

=== Services ===
The passenger services are provided by the Intercités and TER services. Brive railway station has seen renovated Coral trains, now known as Intercités (formerly Teoz), since 2004. The increasing involvement of the regions in the management of regional express transport has allowed a slight optimisation of the TER service in all Nouvelle-Aquitaine stations. While awaiting construction of the LGV Poitiers–Limoges, a TGV service linking Lille-Europe to Brive was set up in 2007, but was cancelled at the end of May 2016, and the LGV Poitiers-Limoges project cancelled in 2017.

=== Other transport services ===
There is a bike parking area and two car parks for the vehicles. The station is served by buses: from the Libéo network (lines 3, 7, and N-Shuttle), the Réseau Departmental de la Corrèze (intercity network) (lines 1,2,3,4,5,8 and 9) and the network Les bus du Lot (line 24).

== Train services ==
The following services currently call at Brive-la-Gaillarde:

- intercity services (Intercites) Paris – Vierzon – Limoges – Toulouse
- local service (TER Auvergne-Rhône-Alpes) Brive-la-Gaillarde – Aurillac
- local service (TER Nouvelle-Aquitaine) Limoges – Saint-Yrieix – Brive-la-Gaillarde
- local service (TER Nouvelle-Aquitaine) Périgueux – Thenon – Brive-la-Gaillarde
- local service (TER Nouvelle-Aquitaine) Limoges – Uzerche – Brive-la-Gaillarde
- local service (TER Nouvelle-Aquitaine) Brive-la-Gaillarde – Tulle – Ussel
- local service (TER Occitanie) Brive-la-Gaillarde – Figeac – Rodez
- local service (TER Occitanie) Brive-la-Gaillarde – Cahors – Montauban – Toulouse
