= Périgueux station =

Railway station in Périgueux, France

Coordinates: 45°11′16″N 0°42′27″E

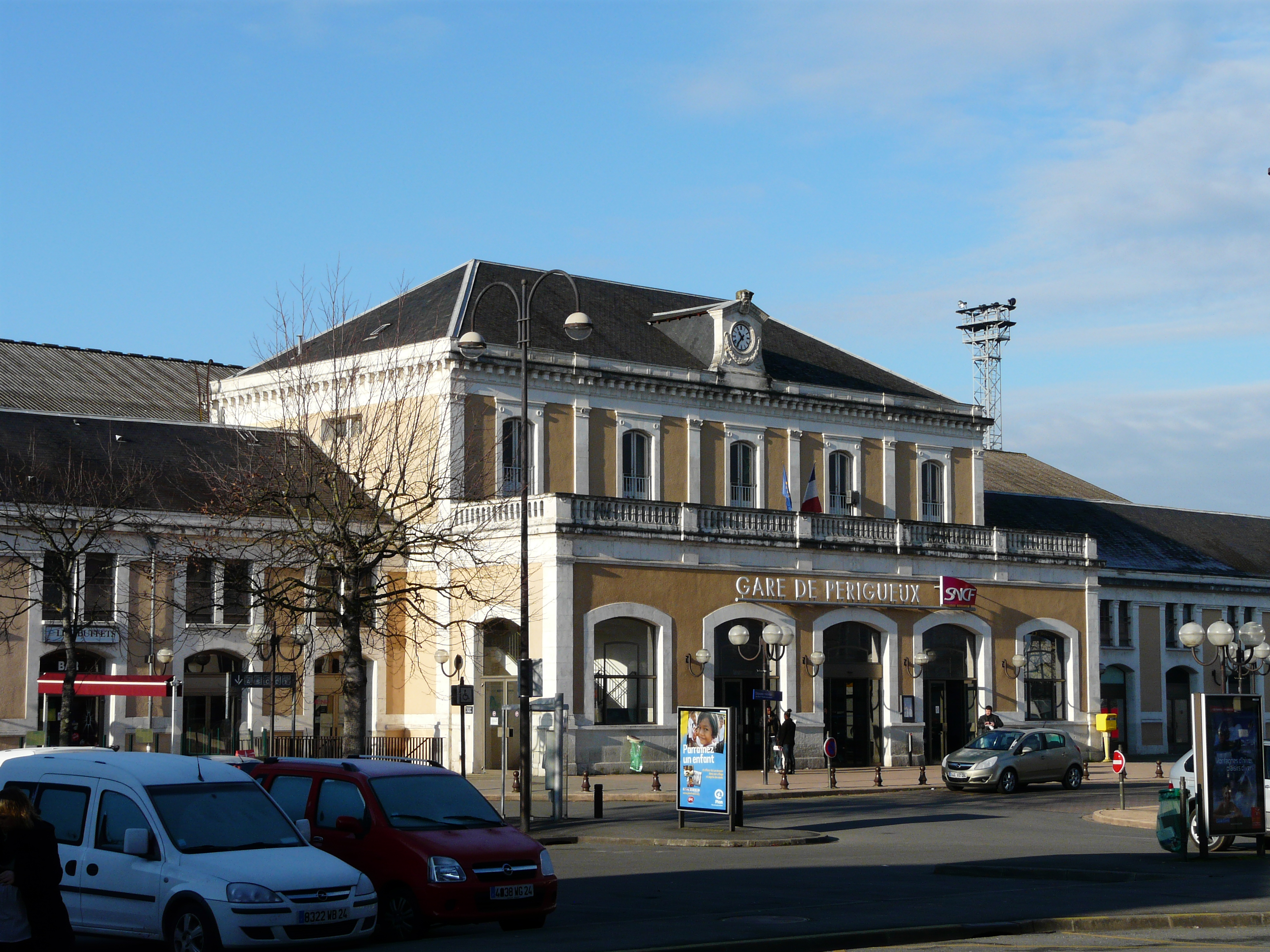
Périgueux station

The Gare de Périgueux is the railway station in the town of Périgueux, in the Dordogne department in France. The station opened in 1857 and is located on the Limoges-Bénédictins - Périgueux and Coutras - Tulle railway lines. The station is served by Intercités (Long distance) and TER (regional) services operated by SNCF, the French national railway.

== Train services ==
The station is served by regional trains to Bordeaux, Limoges, Brive-la-Gaillarde and Agen.

Preceding station	TER Nouvelle-Aquitaine	Following station
Razac towards Bordeaux	31	Château-l'Évêque towards Limoges
Razac towards Bordeaux	32	Boulazac towards Ussel
Terminus	34	Boulazac towards Agen or Sarlat-la-Canéda

== Gallery ==
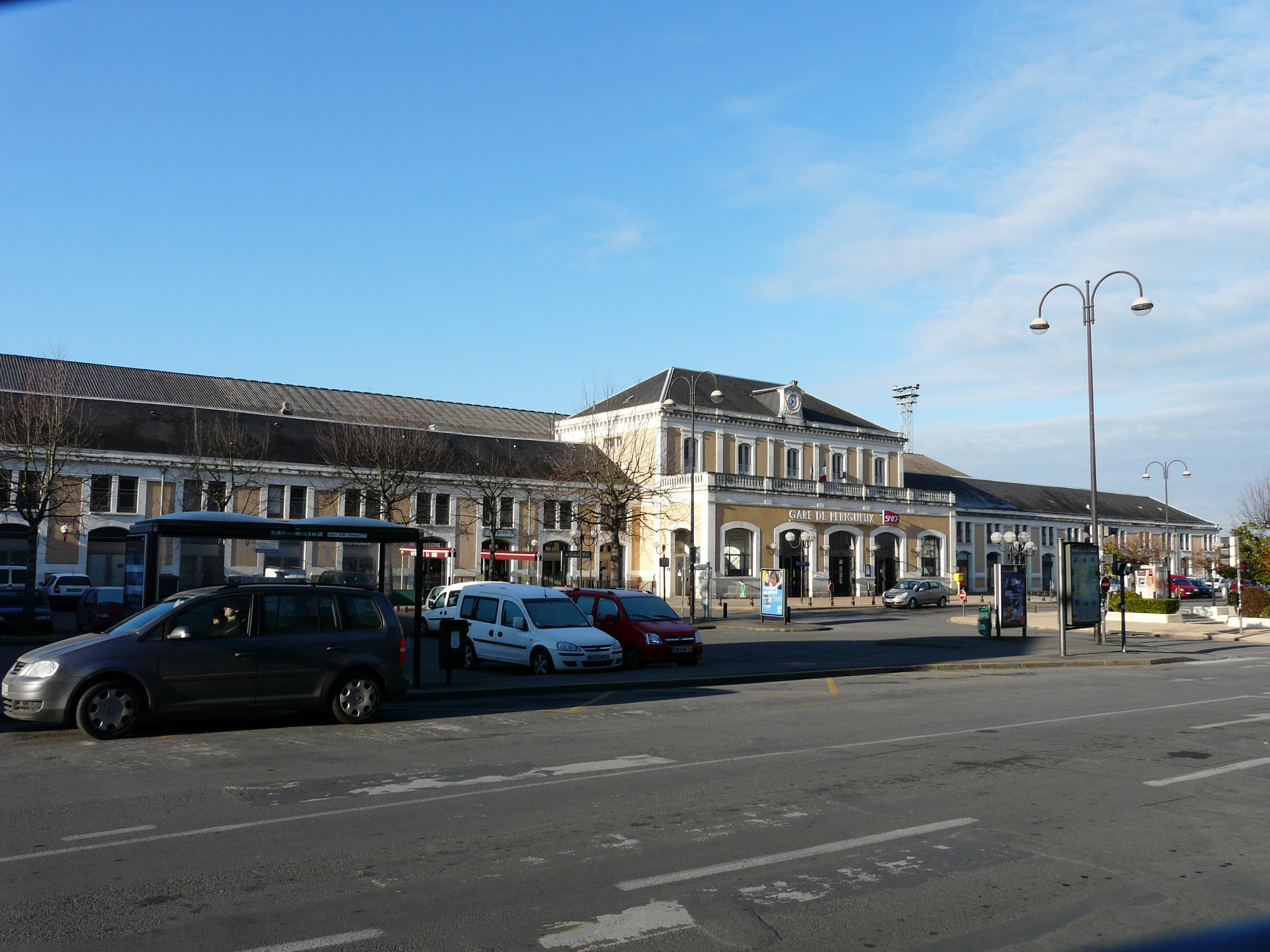
The station

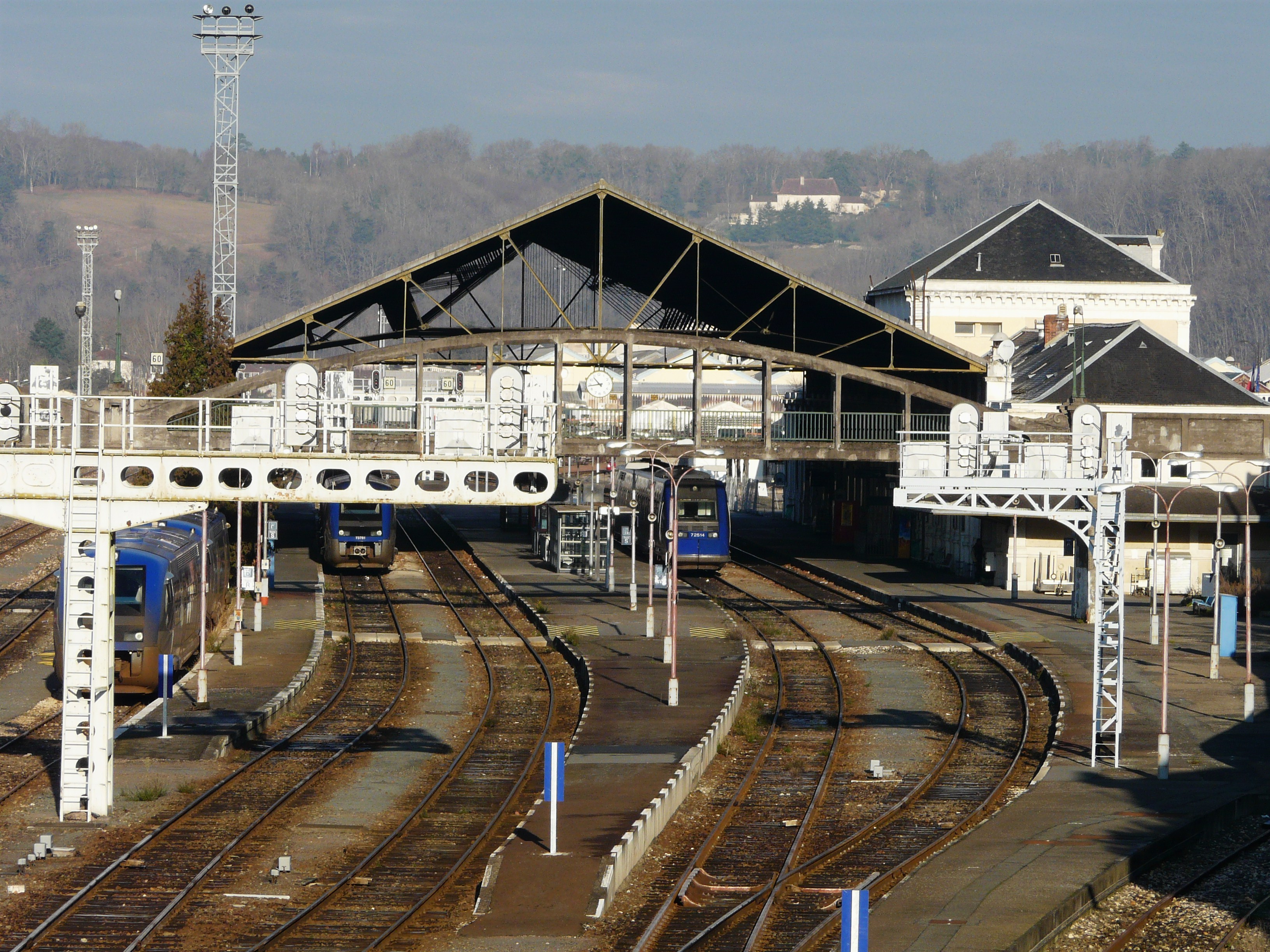
The station

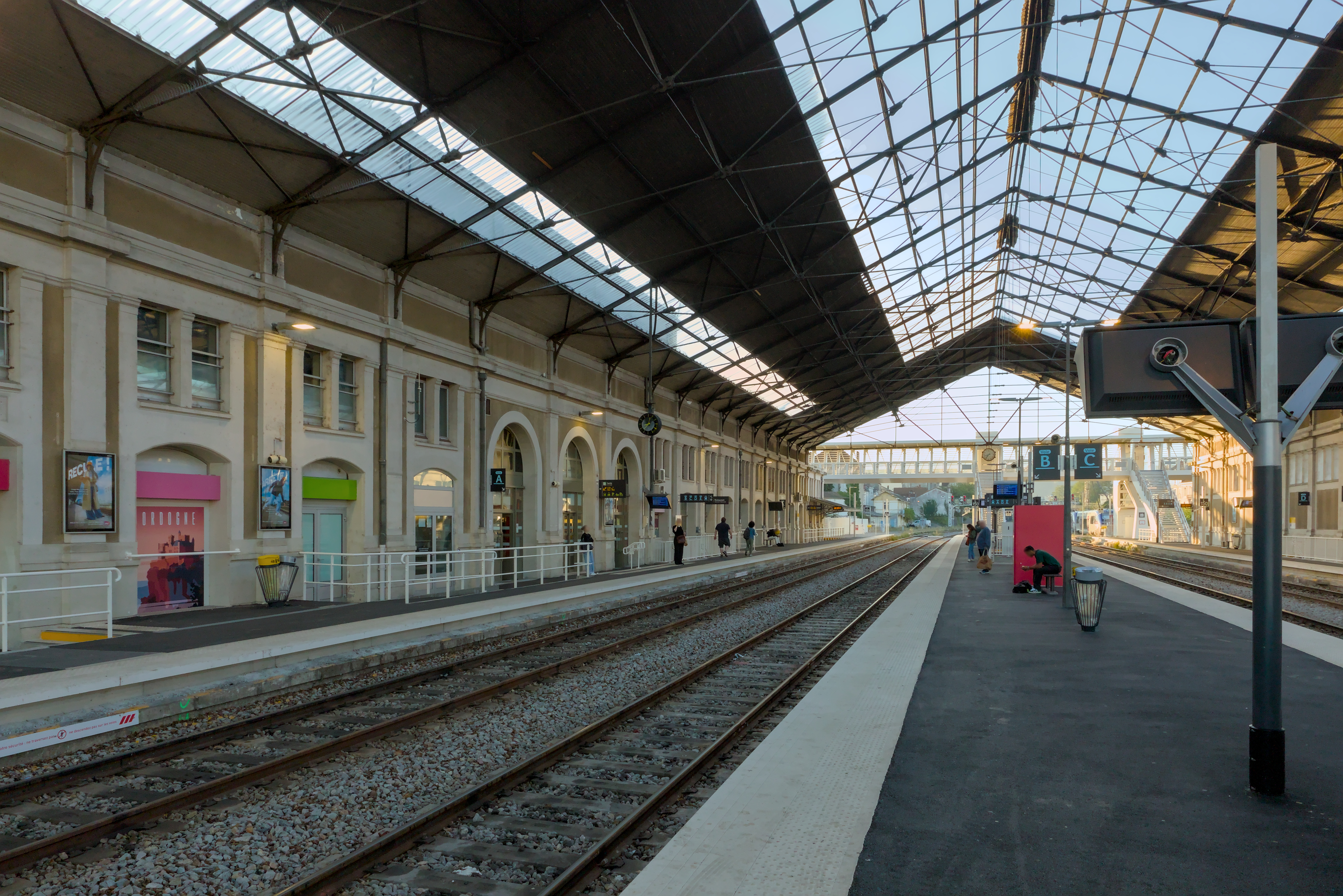
The platforms and tracks

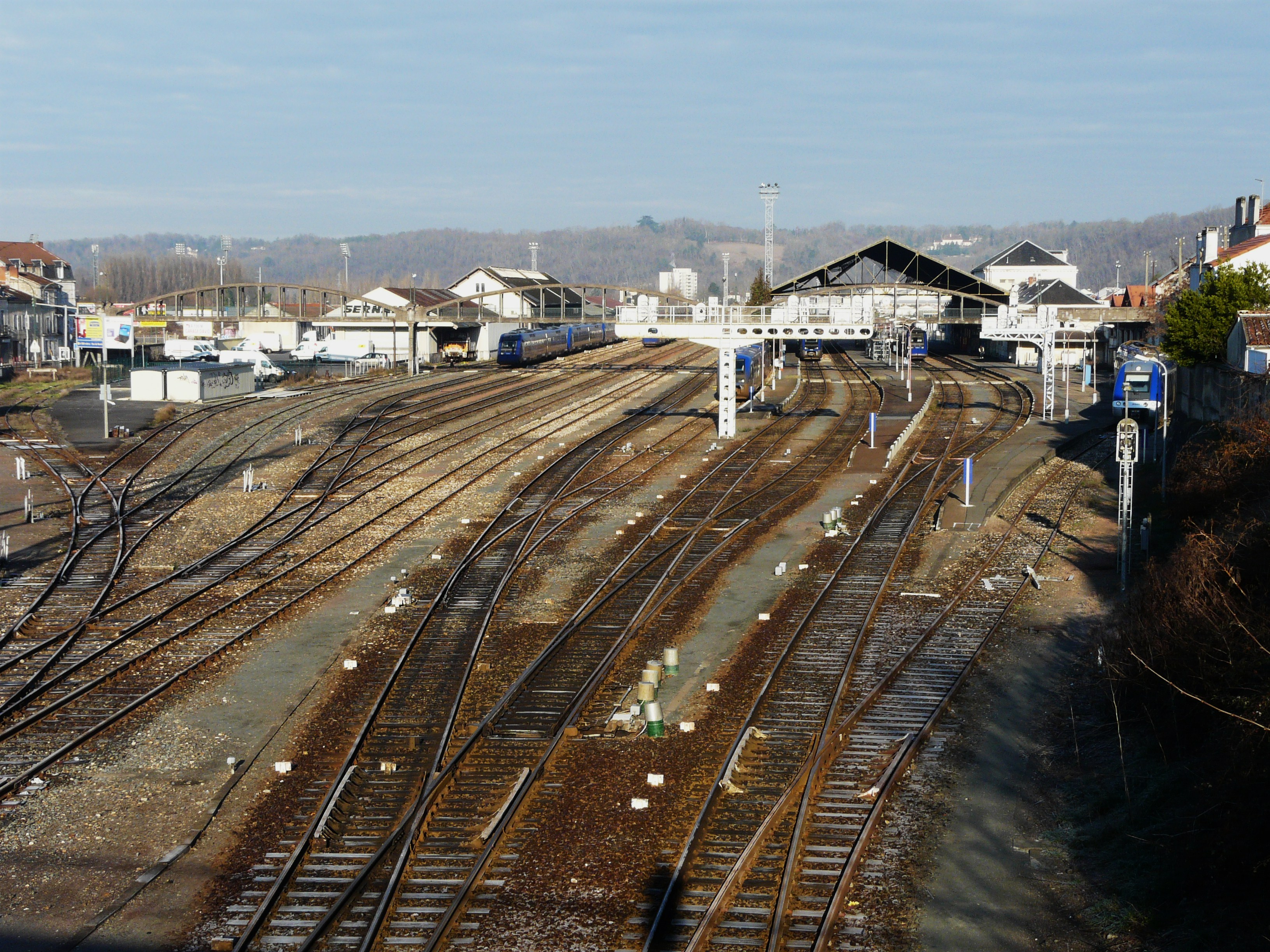
The tracks around the station
