= Bordeaux-Saint-Jean station =

Main railway station of Bordeaux, France

Bordeaux Saint-Jean
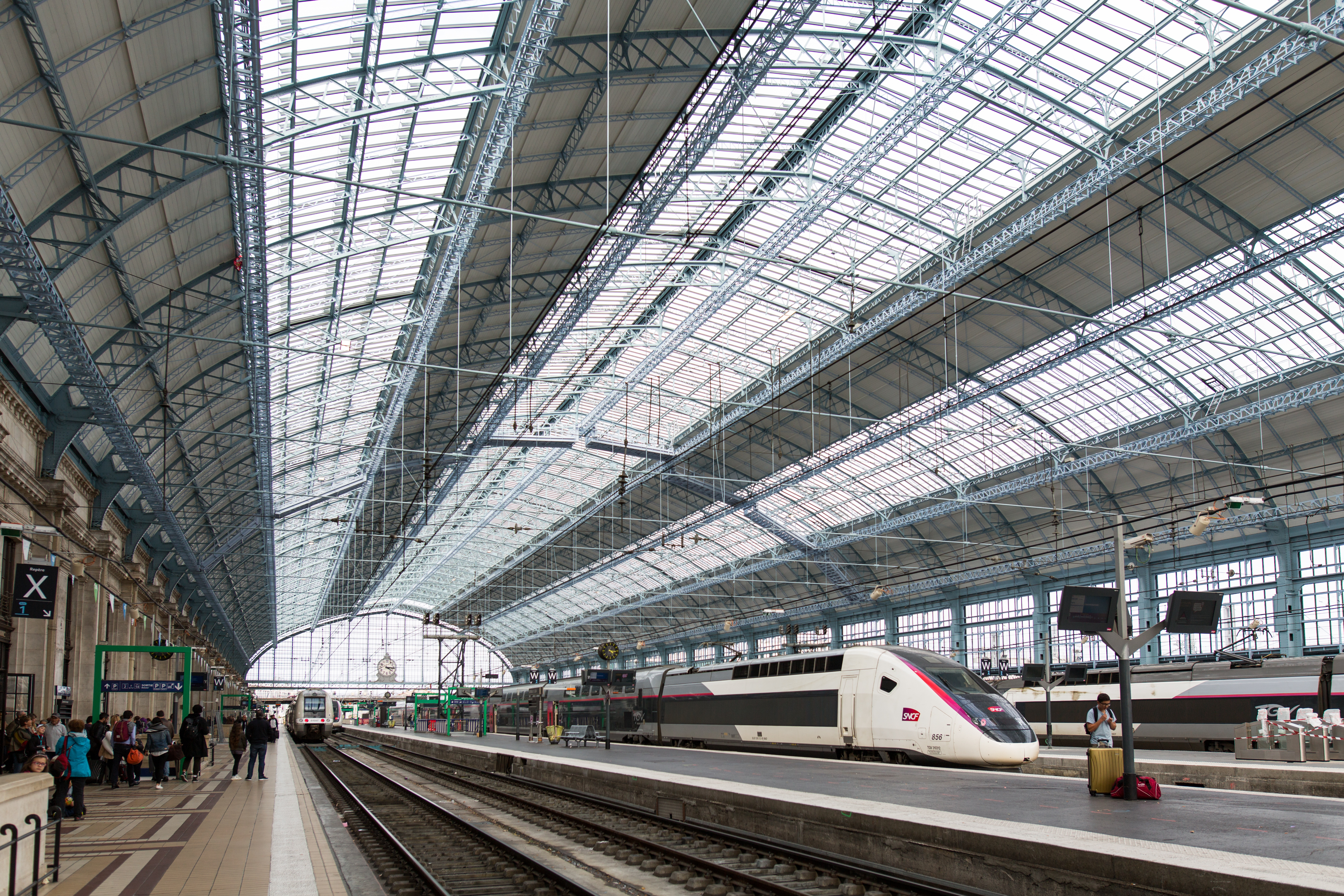
- Gare de Bordeaux-Saint-Jean main hall

General information
- Location: Rue Charles-Domercq, 33800; Bordeaux; France
- Coordinates: 44.8256°N 0.5556°W
- Owner: RFF / SNCF
- Lines: Paris–Bordeaux railway Bordeaux–Sète railway Bordeaux–Irun railway
- Tracks: 15

Other information
- Station code: 87581009

History
- Opened: 1898

Passengers
- 2024: 23,006,240
Location
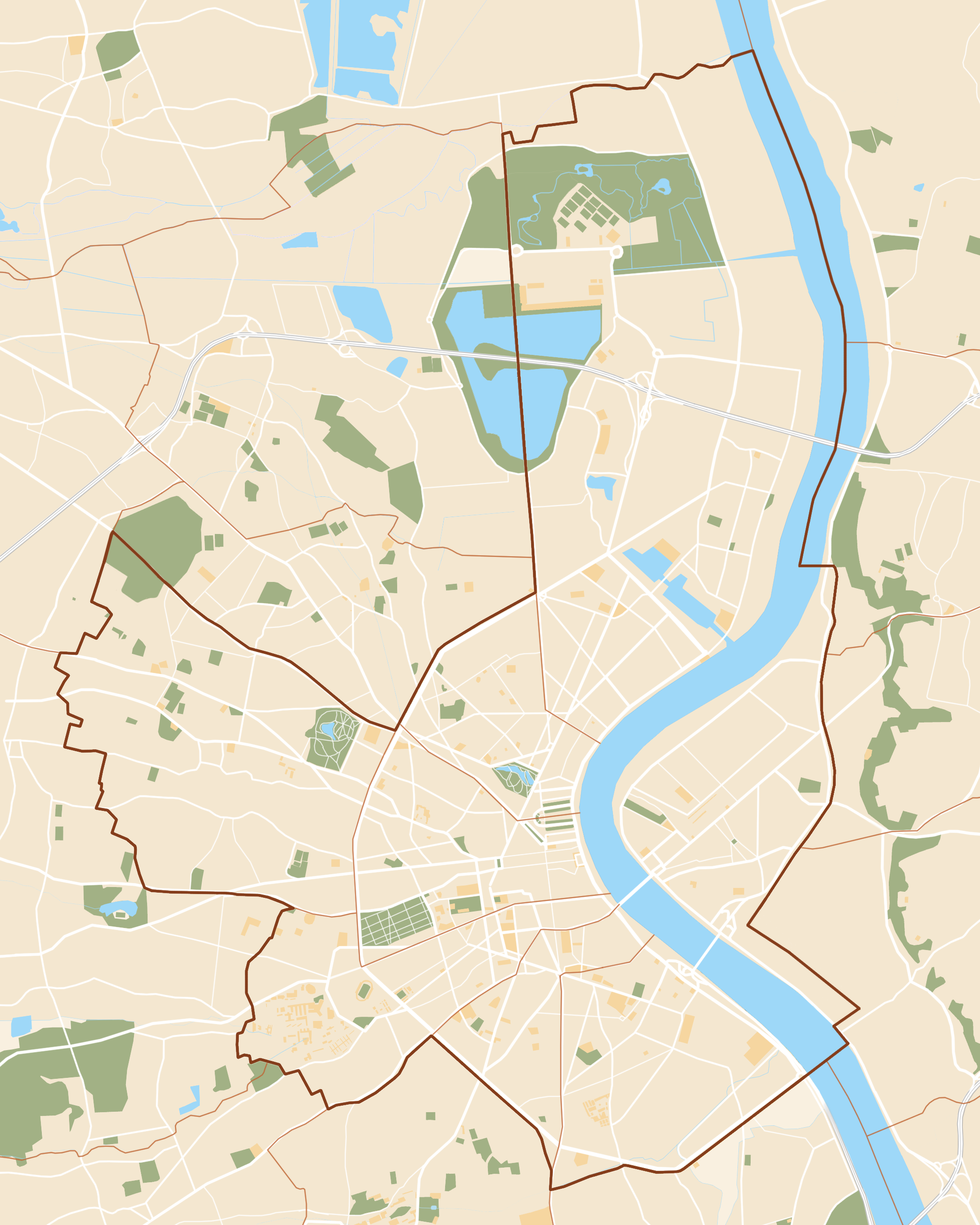
- Location within Bordeaux

Bordeaux-Saint-Jean (Occitan: Bordèu Sent Joan) or formerly Bordeaux-Midi is the main railway station in the French city of Bordeaux. It is the southern terminus of the Paris–Bordeaux railway, and the western terminus of the Chemins de fer du Midi main line from Toulouse. The station is the main railway interchange in Aquitaine and links Bordeaux to Paris, Sète, Toulouse Matabiau and Spain.

The station building is situated in the centre of Bordeaux at the end of the Cours de la Marne, and has a large metallic trainshed, built by Gustave Eiffel. Since the arrival of the TGV the station has been renovated and upgraded with modern equipment, but has kept its original features.

== History ==
The station was built in 1855 under the name Gare du Midi (Midi station) by the Chemins de fer du Midi, as the western terminus of its main line linking Bordeaux and Sète. It used to be less important than the former Bordeaux-Bastide station connecting Bordeaux with Paris on the right bank of the river Garonne.

A long metal viaduct, built by Gustave Eiffel in 1860, allowed trains to cross the river and progressively Bordeaux-Saint-Jean became the Bordeaux main station, needing larger infrastructures.

The current station building opened in 1898. As well as Midi trains, trains from the Paris-Orléans and the État companies called there. The station was built by M Toudoire and S Choron. It includes a large metallic trainshed 56 m wide and covers 17,000 m^{2}, one of the largest in Europe, conceived Daidé&Pillé and constructed by G. Eiffel.

Eiffel two-track bridge became a bottleneck, but it was replaced only in 2008 by a new four-track railway bridge next to it, to prepare the St-Pierre-des-Corps-Bordeaux high speed line opening in 2017.

== Train services ==
=== Current services ===
The following services call at Bordeaux-Saint-Jean as of January 2021:

^ indicates not all trains stop there

- High speed services (TGV)
  - Paris - Bordeaux - Dax - Lourdes - Tarbes
  - Paris - Bordeaux - Dax - Bayonne - Biarritz - Hendaye
  - Paris - Bordeaux - Agen - Toulouse
  - Paris - Bordeaux - Arcachon
  - Paris - St-Pierre-des-corps (Tours) - Poitiers - Angoulême - Bordeaux
  - Lille - Aéroport CDG - Tours - Bordeaux
  - Strasbourg - Marne la Vallée Chessy - St-Pierre-des-corps (Tours) - Bordeaux
- Discount high speed services (Ouigo TGV)
  - Paris Montparnasse - St-Pierre-des-corps (Tours) - Poitiers - Angoulême - Bordeaux - Agen - Montauban - Toulouse
- Intercity services (Intercités)
  - Bordeaux - Toulouse - Montpellier - Marseille
  - Nantes - La Rochelle - Bordeaux
- local services (TER Nouvelle-Aquitaine)
  - Bordeaux - Libourne - Angoulême
  - Bordeaux - Saintes - La Rochelle
  - Bordeaux - Libourne - Périgueux - Limoges
  - Bordeaux - Libourne - Périgueux - Brive-la-Gaillarde - Ussel
  - Bordeaux - Libourne - Bergerac - Sarlat-la-Canéda
  - Bordeaux - Arcachon
  - Bordeaux - Lesparre - Le Verdon
  - Bordeaux - Langon - Marmande - Agen
  - Bordeaux - Morcenx - Mont-de-Marsan
  - Bordeaux - Dax - Bayonne - Hendaye
  - Bordeaux - Dax - Pau - Tarbes

=== Projected services ===
- High speed service (Eurostar) London St Pancras - Bordeaux in 2022
- Intercity service Bordeaux-Lyon in mid 2022 by a new private society operator Railcoop

== Twinning ==
A commemorative plaque at Bordeaux-Saint-Jean

In October 2019, Gare de Bordeaux-Saint-Jean was twinned with London St Pancras International in England. The association was made in the hope that a high speed service could connect the two stations, and was announced at a ceremony headed by Claude Solard, Director General of SNCF.

== See also ==
- Gare de Bordeaux État (État)
- Gare de Bordeaux Passerelle (PO)
- Gare de Bordeaux Bastide (PO)
- Gare de Bordeaux Ravezies (ex. Saint-Louis)
- Gare de Bordeaux Brienne
- Gare de Bordeaux Bénauge (PO-Midi-Etat)

| Preceding station | SNCF | Following station |
|---|---|---|
| Agen towards Toulouse | TGV inOui | Angoulême towards Montparnasse |
| Dax towards Hendaye or Tarbes | TGV inOui | Massy TGV towards Montparnasse |
| Facture-Biganos towards Arcachon | TGV inOui | Angoulême towards Montparnasse |
| Terminus | TGV inOui | Angoulême towards Lille-Flandres |
| Terminus | TGV | Libourne towards Lille-Flandres |
| Terminus | Intercités | Marmande towards Marseille |
| Jonzac towards Nantes | Intercités | Terminus |
| Preceding station | Ouigo | Following station |
| Angoulême towards Tourcoing | Grande Vitesse | Terminus |
| Poitiers towards Montparnasse | Grande Vitesse | Terminus |
| Montparnasse Terminus | Grande Vitesse | Agen towards Toulouse |
| Preceding station | TER Nouvelle-Aquitaine | Following station |
| Terminus | 13 | Cenon towards Angoulême |
| Cenon towards La Rochelle | 15 | Terminus |
| Terminus | 31 | Cenon towards Limoges |
| Terminus | 32 | Cenon towards Ussel |
| Terminus | 33 | Cenon towards Sarlat-la-Canéda |
| Terminus | 41.1U | Cenon towards Coutras |
| Terminus | 41.2U | Pessac towards Arcachon |
| Terminus | 42 | Mérignac-Arlac towards Le Verdon |
| Terminus | 43.1U | Cenon towards Saint-Mariens–Saint-Yzan |
| Terminus | 43.2U | Bègles towards Langon |
| Terminus | 44 | Beautiran towards Agen |
| Terminus | 45 | Pessac towards Mont-de-Marsan |
| Terminus | 51 | Pessac towards Hendaye |
| Terminus | 52 | Pessac towards Tarbes |
