= Limoges-Bénédictins station =

Railway station in Limoges, France

Limoges-Bénédictins

General information
- Location: 4, place Maison-Dieu; 87036 Limoges; Haute-Vienne, France
- Coordinates: 45°50′10″N 1°16′3″E
- Owner: SNCF
- Operator: SNCF
- Line: Orléans–Montauban railway
- Platforms: 5
- Tracks: 10 + service tracks

Construction
- Architect: Roger Gonthier

Other information
- Station code: 87592006

History
- Opened: 16 June 1856

Passengers
- 2024: 2,028,613
Services
Preceding station	SNCF	Following station
La Souterraine towards Paris-Austerlitz	Intercités	Uzerche towards Toulouse
Preceding station	TER Nouvelle-Aquitaine	Following station
Terminus	18	Limoges-Montjovis towards Angoulême
Terminus	21	Les Bardys towards Châteauroux
Terminus	22	Solignac-Le Vigen towards Brive-la-Gaillarde
Terminus	23	L'Aiguille towards Brive-la-Gaillarde
Nieul towards Poitiers	24	Terminus
Terminus	25	Ambazac towards Montluçon
Terminus	26	Saint-Priest-Taurion towards Ussel
L'Aiguille towards Bordeaux	31	Terminus
Preceding station	Le Réseau Rémi	Following station
Les Bardys towards Vierzon	1.3	Terminus
Location

Limoges-Bénédictins (French: Gare de Limoges-Bénédictins) is the main railway station of Limoges. It is situated on the Orléans–Montauban railway. It was named Bénédictins due to the presence of a Benedictine monastery closed during the French Revolution.

== History ==
The CF du PO opened the first railway line in the city in the 1850s. The first station, built of wood, opened on 16 June 1856. The first stone-built station opened in 1860.

On 21 November 1918, the city council of Limoges and CF du PO signed an agreement regarding the construction of a new station. The construction works lasted from 1924 and 1929. The station was inaugurated on 2 July 1929.

The Germans also used an underground roadway as a passive defense shelter, located under the tracks, which previously linked the Ambazac road to Locarno Avenue, now partly walled. The "Wehrmacht Reserved" sign (nur für Wehrmacht) is still present.

On the night of 23–24 June 1944, thanks to information from the Resistance, the Allies bombarded the Puy-Imbert marshalling yard in Limoges, preventing the movement of trains for more than a week. The next day, the Germans requisitioned the labor available to clear and clear ... under a sun of lead.

The station was listed as a monument historique on 15 January 1975 and work to restore the Great Hall ended in 1979.

About 13:20 on 5 February 1998, a fire broke out under the station's dome. The city's population was deeply moved and distressed, and the dome was rebuilt to its original design.

The railway accident at Brétigny-sur-Orge was a derailment on 12 July 2013 at the Brétigny railway station in the commune of Brétigny-sur-Orge (Essonne), 28 km south of Paris. Following the failure of a splint, a metal part used to connect two consecutive rails, several cars from a passenger train between Paris-Austerlitz and Limoges-Bénédictins derailed, resulting in the death of seven people.

On May 20, 2008, the Limoges station was used for the filming of an advertising clip for the perfume Chanel No 5, "Un train de nuit", directed by Jean-Pierre Jeunet and featuring actress Audrey Tautou. The rest of the clip was shot in the stations of Nice and Istanbul, around the theme of the Orient-Express. At the end, broadcast in 2009, the station appears at the very beginning of the clip, Audrey Tautou running on the forecourt and causing some pigeons to fly up. This clip suggests that the Limoges station could be the departure of a direct train to Istanbul

== Architecture ==
Bénédictins station was designed by architect Roger Gonthier. A particularity of the station is that it was built over the ten railway lines as opposed to next to them. A large 90 by 78 metre platform was built over the line to support the station building.

The building is made of a concrete skeleton, filled in with limestone. The dome which covers the passenger concourse is made of a metallic framework, covered in copper.

On the Southwest corner is a 67-metre-tall (220 ft) clock tower composed of thirteen levels. It is mounted by a dome itself mounted by a five-metre-tall (16 ft) vase. Below these are four 4-metre-wide (13 ft) clocks.

The first floors are occupied by offices. The view from the top floors is stunning over the city of Limoges, part of the agglomeration and the Vienne valley. You can see most of the most important monuments of the city: the town hall, the churches of Saint-Michel and Saint-Pierre, the Gay-Lussac high school, the city of Coutures, the Cathédrale Saint-Étienne de Limoges, the Bastide, The technopole or the castle of the Bastide.

== Services ==
The following services call at Limoges-Bénédictins as of January 2021:

- intercity services (Intercités) Paris - Vierzon - Limoges - Toulouse
- local service (TER Nouvelle-Aquitaine) Limoges - Angoulême (partly by bus)
- local service (TER Nouvelle-Aquitaine) Limoges - Uzerche - Brive-la-Gaillarde
- local service (TER Nouvelle-Aquitaine) Limoges - Saint-Yrieix - Brive-la-Gaillarde (partly by bus)
- local service (TER Nouvelle-Aquitaine) Limoges - Poitiers
- local service (TER Nouvelle-Aquitaine) Limoges - Guéret - Montluçon
- local service (TER Nouvelle-Aquitaine) Limoges - Ussel
- local service (TER Nouvelle-Aquitaine) Limoges - Thiviers - Périgueux - Bordeaux
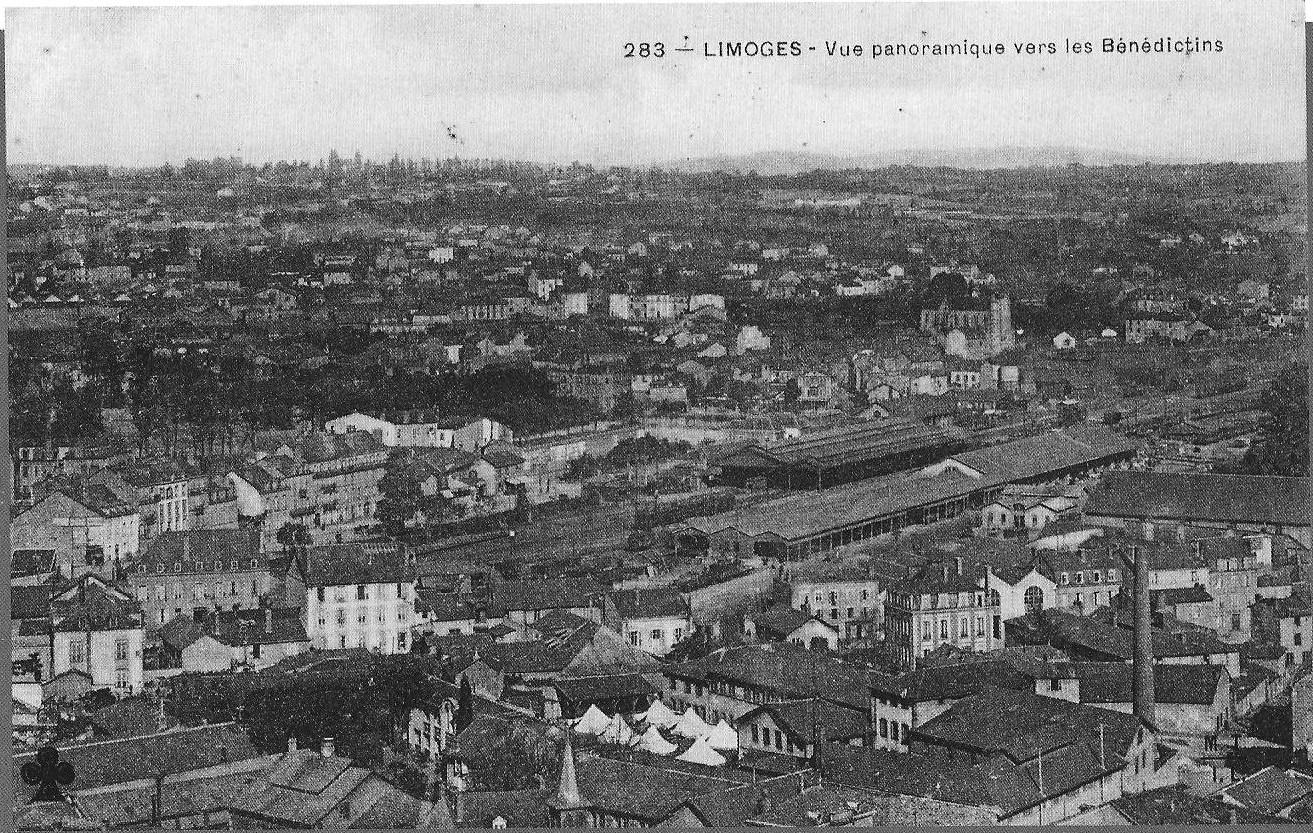
The former station (~1905)

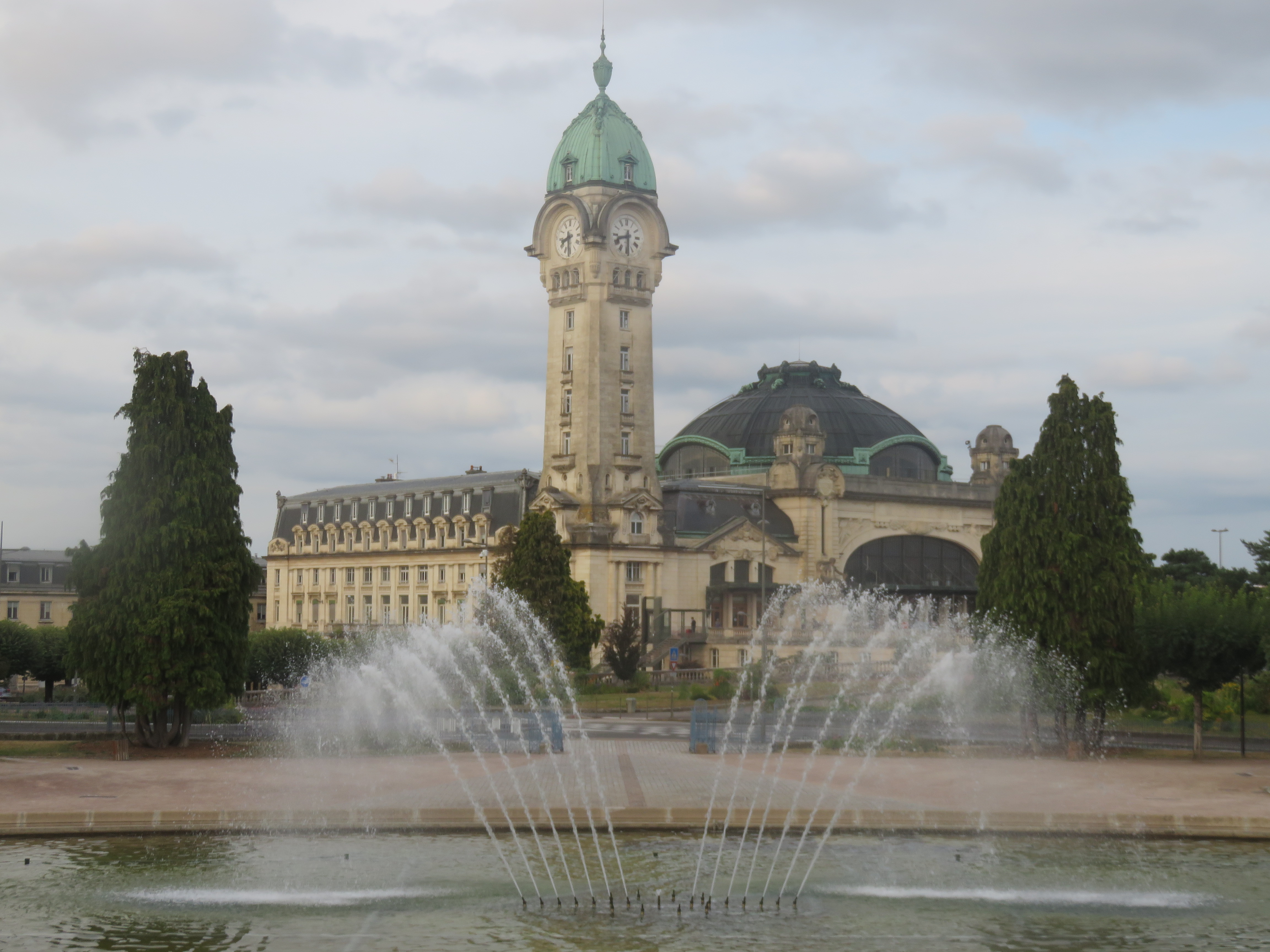
Southwest facade, seen from Place Champ-de-Juillet

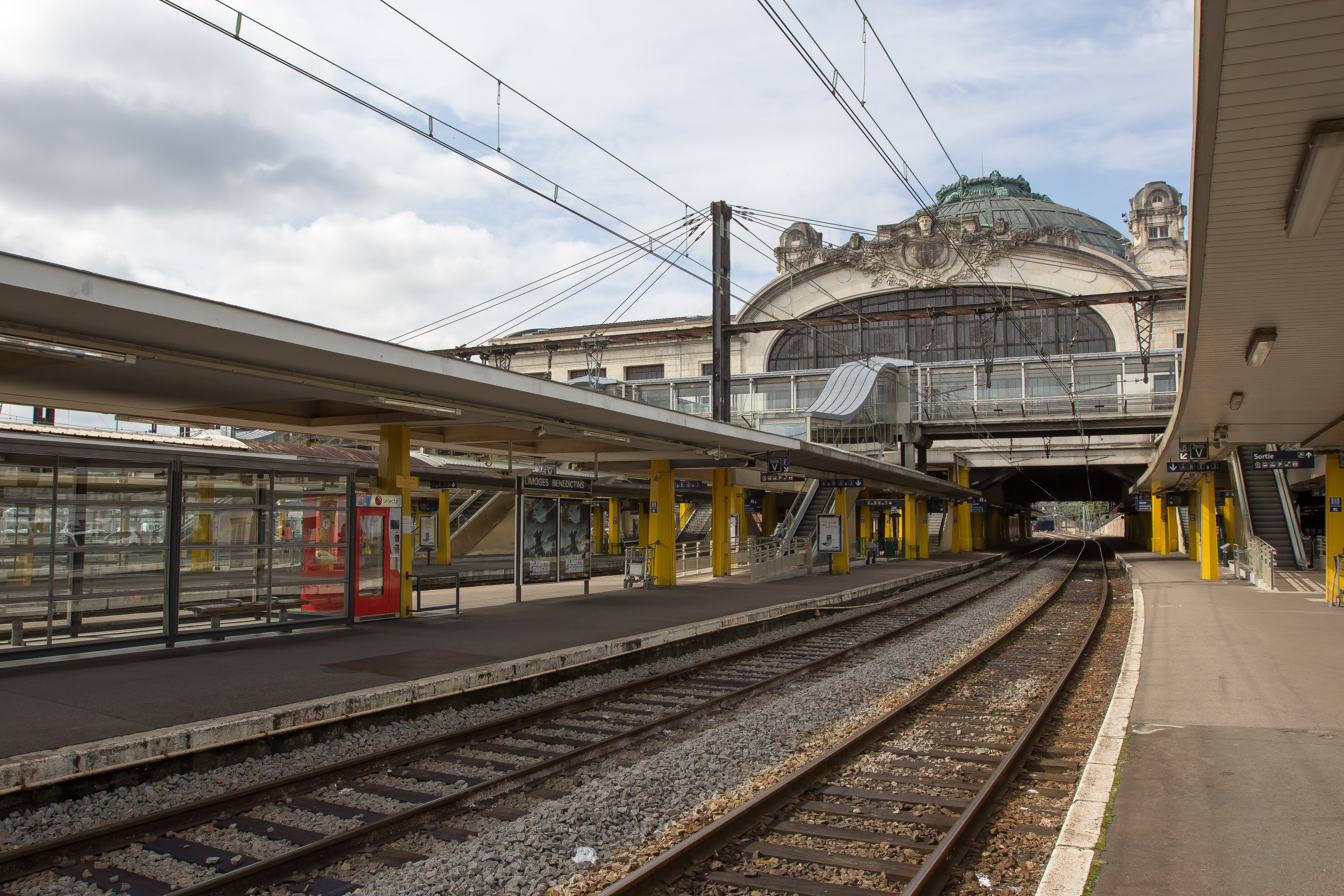
Platforms
