= St. Peter ad vincula =

Saint Peter ad vincula (Saint Peter in chains) alludes to the biblical story of the liberation of Saint Peter.

It may refer to:

== Festivals and relics ==
- Liturgical feast of the Liberation of Saint Peter celebrated on 1 August in:
  - the pre-1962 General Calendar of the Roman Rite and listed in:
    - Tridentine calendar
    - General Roman Calendar as in 1954
    - General Roman Calendar of Pope Pius XII.
  - as a major double feast day by some traditionalist Catholics
  - a third class feast by the Priestly Fraternity of St. Peter (FSSP)
- Veneration of the Precious Chains of the Holy and All-Glorious Apostle Peter on January 16 in the Byzantine Rite (Catholic and Orthodox).
- Relics of the chains of St. Peter

== Church buildings ==
=== Belgium ===
- St. Peter in Chains Church (Beringen)
- Sint-Pieters-Bandenkerk, Bertem
- Sint-Pietersbandenkerk, Dudzele, Bruges
- Sint-Pietersbandenkerk, Halen
- Sint-Pietersbandenkerk, Lommel
- Church Saint-Pierre-aux-Liens, a protected heritage site in Ellezelles
- Sint-Pietersbandenkerk, Oostkamp
- Sint-Pietersbandenkerk, Geraardsbergen

=== Canada ===
- Église Saint-Pierre-aux-Liens, an historic place in Gloucester County, New Brunswick
- Cathedral of Saint Peter-in-Chains, Peterborough, Ontario

=== Croatia ===
- St Peter, Uble, Island of Lastovo

=== Czech Republic ===
- Kostel svatého Petra v okovech, Kostelní Hlavno, Prague-East District
- Kostel svatého Petra v okovech, Krahulov, Třebíč District
- Saint Peter ad Vincula Church, Velenka, Nymburk District

=== Germany ===
- St. Petrus in Ketten (Astheim), Trebur, Hesse
- St. Petrus in Ketten (Bliesmengen-Bolchen), Saarland
- Kirche St. Peter in Ketten, Boppard, Rhineland-Palatinate
- St. Petrus in Ketten (Burkardroth), Bad Kissingen, Lower Franconia
- St. Petrus in Ketten (Brebersdorf), Wasserlosen, Bavaria
- St. Petrus zu den Ketten, Lower Saxony
- St.-Petrus-Kirche (Gesmold), Lower Saxony
- St. Petrus in Ketten (Haslach), Biberach, Upper Swabia
- St. Petrus in Ketten (Hilbringen), Saarland
- St. Peter in Ketten, Montabaur, Rhineland-Palatinate
- St. Petrus in Ketten (Reinholterode), Eichsfeld, Thuringia
- St. Petrus Kirche, Rust, Baden-Württemberg

=== France ===
- Saint-Pierre es Liens, Alaigne, Aude, Occitanie
- Saint-Pierre-aux-Liens, Alata, Corse-du-Sud, Corsica
- Église Saint-Pierre-aux-Liens, Allemans, Dordogne
- Saint-Pierre-aux-Liens, Ambly-Fleury, Ardennes, Grand Est
- Saint-Pierre-aux-Liens, Annot, Alpes-de-Haute-Provence, Provence-Alpes-Côte d'Azur
- Parish church of Saint-Victor and Saint-Pierre-ès-Liens, Antignac, Cantal
- Église Saint-Pierre-aux-Liens, Antisanti, Haute-Corse
- Église Saint-Pierre-ès-Liens, Argançon, Aube
- Saint-Pierre-ès-Liens, Arrelles, Aube, Grand Est
- Église Saint-Pierre-aux-Liens, Arzano, Finistère, Brittany
- Saint-Pierre-aux-Liens, Aurignac, Haute-Garonne
- Église Saint-Pierre-ès-Liens, Avon-la-Pèze, Aube
- Saint-Pierre-aux-Liens, Balaives-et-Butz, Ardennes, Grand Est
- Saint Pierre-es-Liens, Balot, Côte-d'Or
- Saint-Pierre-ès-Liens, Bassignac-le-Haut, Corrèze, Nouvelle-Aquitaine
- Église de Saint-Pierre-ès-Liens, Bessan, Hérault
- Église Saint-Pierre-ès-Liens, Blérancourt, Aisne
- Église Saint-Pierre-ès-Liens, Boigny-sur-Bionne, Loiret
- Église Saint-Pierre-ès-Liens, Bourdeilles, Dordogne
- Saint-Pierre-aux-Liens, Bulle, Gruyère
- Église Saint-Pierre-ès-Liens, Chantérac, Dordogne
- Église St-Pierre-aux-Liens (Chapelle des Carmes-Déchaux), Clermont-Ferrand, Auvergne
- Saint-Pierre-aux-Liens altar, Brasparts Parish close, Châteaulin, Brittany
- Church of Saint-Pierre-ès-Liens, Chédigny, Indre-et-Loire
- Église Saint-Pierre-aux-Liens de Cohennoz, Savoie
- Église St-Pierre-ès-Liens, Colonzelle, Drôme
- Église St-Pierre-aux-Liens, Curbigny, Saône-et-Loire
- Église Saint-Pierre-ès-Liens, Cussac, Haute-Vienne
- Église Saint-Pierre-ès-liens, Dampierre-en-Bresse, Saône-et-Loire
- Église Saint-Pierre-ès-liens, La Douze, Dordogne
- Église Saint-Pierre-ès-Liens, Aubie-et-Espessas, Gironde
- Église Saint-Pierre-ès-Liens, L'Escarène, Alpes-Maritimes
- Église Saint-Pierre-aux-Liens, Étais-la-Sauvin, Yonne
- Église Saint-Pierre-ès-Liens, Eyvirat, Dordogne
- Church of Saint-Pierre-ès-Liens, Fervaches, Manches
- Église Saint-Pierre-aux-Liens, Garat, Charente
- Église Saint-Pierre-aux-Liens, La Giettaz, Savoie
- Église Saint-Pierre-ès-Liens, Dercie, Le Gua, Charente-Maritime
- Église Saint-Pierre-ès-Liens, Jumeauville, Île-de-France
- Église Saint-Pierre-ès-Liens, Les Riceys, Aube
- Église Saint-Pierre-ès-Liens, Médis, Charente-Maritime
- Église Saint-Pierre-ès-Liens, Ménestérol, Montpon-Ménestérol, Dordogne
- Saint-Pierre-ès-Liens, Mérifons, Hérault
- Saint-Pierre-aux-Liens, Molliens-Dreuil, Somme, Hauts-de-France
- Église Saint-Pierre-ès-Lien, Mondonville, Haute-Garonne
- Église Saint-Pierre-ès-Liens, Moyemont, Voges
- Église Saint-Pierre-ès-Liens, Négrondes, Dordogne
- Église Saint-Pierre-ès-Liens, (replaced by Notre-Dame-de-Sanilhac), Notre-Dame-de-Sanilhac, Dordogne
- Église Saint-Pierre-ès-Liens, Noailhac, Limousin
- Église Saint-Pierre-aux-Liens, Orgerus, Yvelines
- Church of Saint Pierre-ès-Liens of Doumillac, Pujols, Lot-et-Garonne
- Church of Saint-Pierre-ès-Liens, Rampoux, Lot
- Église Saint-Pierre-aux-liens, Ruoms, Ardéche
- Église Saint-Pierre-ès-liens, Saint-Pierre-de-Chignac, Dordogne
- Église Saint-Pierre-ès-Liens, Saint-Pierre-de-Côle, Dordogne
- Saint-Pierre-ès-Liens Church, Sorigny, Indre-et-Loire
- Église Saint-Pierre-ès-Liens, Thaims, Charente-Maritime
- Église Saint-Pierre-ès-Liens, Vieux-Mareuil, Dordogne

=== Italy ===
- Basilica of San Pietro in Vincoli in Rome, the origin of the dedication
- San Pietro in Vincoli, Bienno, Val Camonica, Lombardy (deconsecrated)
- San Pietro in Vinculis, Castellino del Biferno, Molise
- San Pietro in Vincoli, Ittiri, province of Sassari
- San Pietro in Vincoli, Lanzo Torinese Turin, Piedmont
- San Pietro in Vincoli, Madignano, Lombardy
- San Pietro in Vincoli, Moncalvo, Asti, Piedmont
- San Pietro in Vinculis, Naples
- San Pietro in Vinculis (Pisa)
- San Pietro in Vincoli, Salerno
- San Pietro in Vincoli, Spinone al Lago, Bergamo
- San Pietro in Vincoli, Tavernette, Cumiana, Piedmont

=== Netherlands ===
- Sint-Petrus'-Bandenkerk, Bergeijk
- Sint-Petrus'-Bandenkerk, Diemen
- Sint-Petrus'-Bandenkerk, Gilze
- Sint-Petrus'-Bandenkerk, Hilvarenbeek
- Sint-Petrus'-Bandenkerk, Heer, Maastricht
- Sint Petrus Banden, Heesch
- Sint-Petrus'-Bandenkerk, Leende
- Sint-Petrus'-Bandenkerk, Macharen
- Sint Petrus Banden, Oirschot
- Sint-Petrus'-Bandenkerk, Oisterwijk
- Sint-Petrus'-Bandenkerk, Son
- Sint-Petrus'-Bandenkerk, Venray

=== Poland ===
- Kościół św. Piotra w Okowach w Chobienicach
- Parafia św. Piotra w Okowach w Białej k. Wielunia
- Parafia św. Piotra w Okowach w Chobienicach
- Parafia św. Piotra w Okowach w Pietrzwałdzie
- Parafia Świętego Marcina i Świętego Piotra w Okowach w Konarzewie

=== Spain ===
- San Pedro ad Víncula, Alfoz de Lloredo, Cantabria
- San Pedro ad Víncula, Escañuela, Jaén
- Church of St Peter ad Vincula, Madrid, Vallecas, Madrid

=== Switzerland ===
- Eglise Saint-Pierre-aux-Liens, a cultural property of regional significance in Geneva, Switzerland

=== United Kingdom ===
==== England ====
- St Peter ad Vincula, Bottesford, Lincolnshire
- Church of St Peter ad Vincula, Broad Hinton, Wiltshire
- St Peter ad Vincula, Coggeshall, Essex
- Church of St Peter ad Vincula, Colemore, Hampshire
- Church of St Peter ad Vincula, Combe Martin, Combe Martin, Devon
- Church of St Peter ad Vincula, Ashwater, Devon
- St Peter ad Vincula, Coveney, Cambridgeshire
- Church of St Nicholas and St Peter ad Vincula, Curdworth, Warwickshire
- St Peter ad Vincula, Ditton, Kent
- Our Lady of Doncaster or St Peter-in-Chains, Doncaster, South Yorkshire
- Church of St Peter ad Vincula, Folkington, East Sussex
- St Peter ad Vincula Church, Hampton Lucy, Warwickshire
- St Peter in Chains Roman Catholic Church, Stroud Green, London
- Church of St Peter ad Vincula, the Chapel Royal in the Tower of London
- St Peter ad Vincula, South Newington, Oxfordshire
- St Peter ad Vincula, Ratley, Warwickshire
- St Peter ad Vincula, Royden, Essex
- Our Lady of the Angels and St Peter in Chains Church, Stoke-on-Trent, Staffordshire
- St Peter ad Vincula, Stoke Minster
- Church of St Peter ad Vincula, Thornaby-on-Tees, North Yorkshire
- St Peter's Church, Threekingham, Lincolnshire; dedicated to St Peter ad Vincula
- St Peter ad Vincula, Tibberton, Worcestershire
- St Peter ad Vincula, Tollard Royal, Wiltshire
- St Peter ad Vincula, Wisborough Green, West Sussex

==== Ireland ====
- St. Peter in Chains, Ballymacoda, County Cork

==== Scotland ====
- St Peter ad Vincula, Ardrossan, North Ayrshire

==== Wales ====
- St Peter ad Vincula, Pennal, the chapel of Owain Glyndŵr

=== United States ===
- Cathedral Basilica of Saint Peter in Chains (Cincinnati), Ohio
- St. Peter in Chains, Hamilton, Ohio

== Other uses ==
- Deusdedit of San Pietro in Vincoli (died 1097–1100), cardinal-priest of San Pietro in Vincoli
- St. Peter In Chains School, Hamilton, Ohio, United States
- Ville Saint-Pierre, a neighborhood of Montreal, Canada, that was originally named Saint-Pierre-aux-Liens
- Cimitero di San Pietro in Vincoli, a cemetery in Turin, Italy

== See also ==
- St. Peter's (disambiguation)
- St. Peter's Church (disambiguation)
