= Atur =

Atur may refer to:

- The Middle Persian word for Atar, the Zoroastrian concept of holy fire
- Atur, Dordogne, a former commune in the Dordogne department in southwestern France, merged in 2016 into the new commune Boulazac-Isle-Manoire
- Assyria, a region on the Upper Tigris river
