= Sainte-Marie-de-Chignac =

- Part of Boulazac Isle Manoire
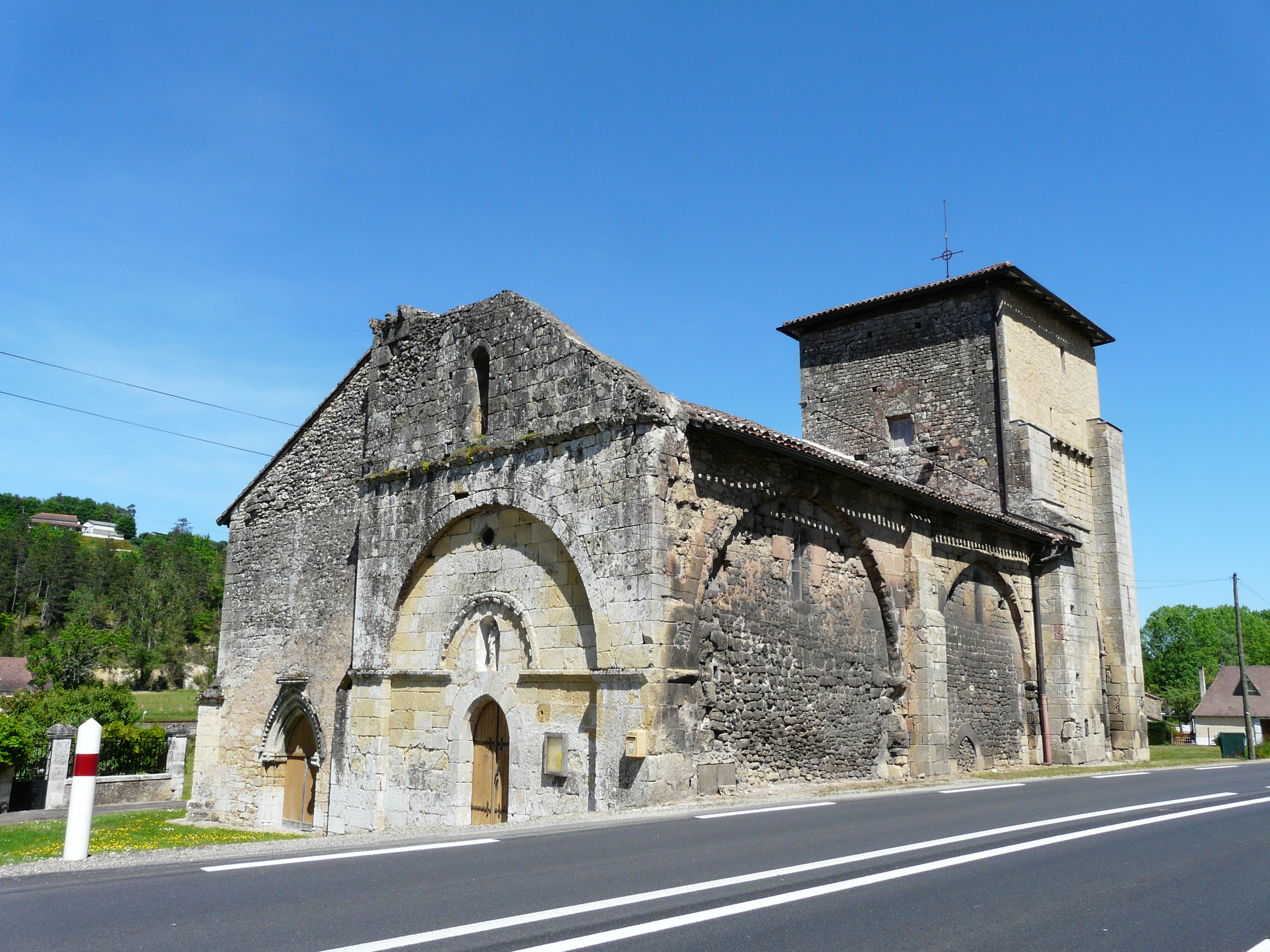
- Location of Sainte-Marie-de-Chignac
- Location within France Location within Nouvelle-Aquitaine
- Coordinates: 45°07′55″N 0°49′47″E
- Country: France
- Region: Nouvelle-Aquitaine
- Department: Dordogne
- Arrondissement: Périgueux
- Canton: Isle-Manoire
- Commune: Boulazac Isle Manoire
- Area^{1}: 11.8 km^{2} (4.6 sq mi)
- Elevation: 120 m (390 ft)
- Highest elevation: 257 m (843 ft)
- Lowest elevation: 110 m (360 ft)
- Population (2023): 604
  - Density: 51.2/km^{2} (133/sq mi)
- Time zone: UTC+01:00 (CET)
  - Summer (DST): UTC+02:00 (CEST)
- Postal code: 24330
- ^{1} French Land Register data, which excludes lakes, ponds, glaciers > 1 km^{2} (0.386 sq mi or 247 acres) and river estuaries.

Sainte-Marie-de-Chignac (French pronunciation: [sɛ̃t maʁi də ʃiɲak]; Limousin: Chinhac) is a former commune in the Dordogne department in Nouvelle-Aquitaine in southwestern France. On 1 January 2017, it was merged into the commune Boulazac Isle Manoire.

== See also ==
- Communes of the Dordogne department
