= Hamade =

Heraldic charge

Example of the hamade in the escutcheon.

Hamade (Note: French: haméïde) is an heraldic ordinary in the shape of three bars placed one under another, not touching the edges of the field. The bars can be of equal length or have the top bar longer than the bottom one. They can have straight edges, or skewed edges, with their base being shorter than their top.

== Etymology ==
The name derives from French word haméïde, and comes from the name of the village of Lahamaide, Belgium, which used the ordinary in its coat of arms.

== Examples ==
The coat of arms of Lahamaide, Belgium.

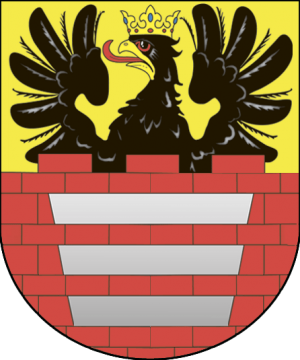
The coat of arms of Mir, Belarus.

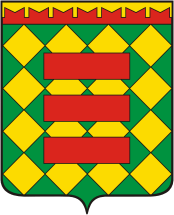
The coat of arms of Nekrasovsky, Russia.

The coat of arms of Fresnes-lès-Montauban, France.

Korczak coat of arms.

== Citations ==
=== Bibliography ===
- J.P. Brooke-Little, (1996). A Heraldic Alphabet. Robson Books.
- Gert Oswald, Lexikon der Heraldik. VEB Bibliographisches Institut, Leipzig 1984. ISBN 3-411-02149-7.
- L.-A. Duhoux d'Argicourt, l'Alphabet et figures de tous les termes du blason, Paris 1899.
