= Marsaneix =

- Part of Sanilhac
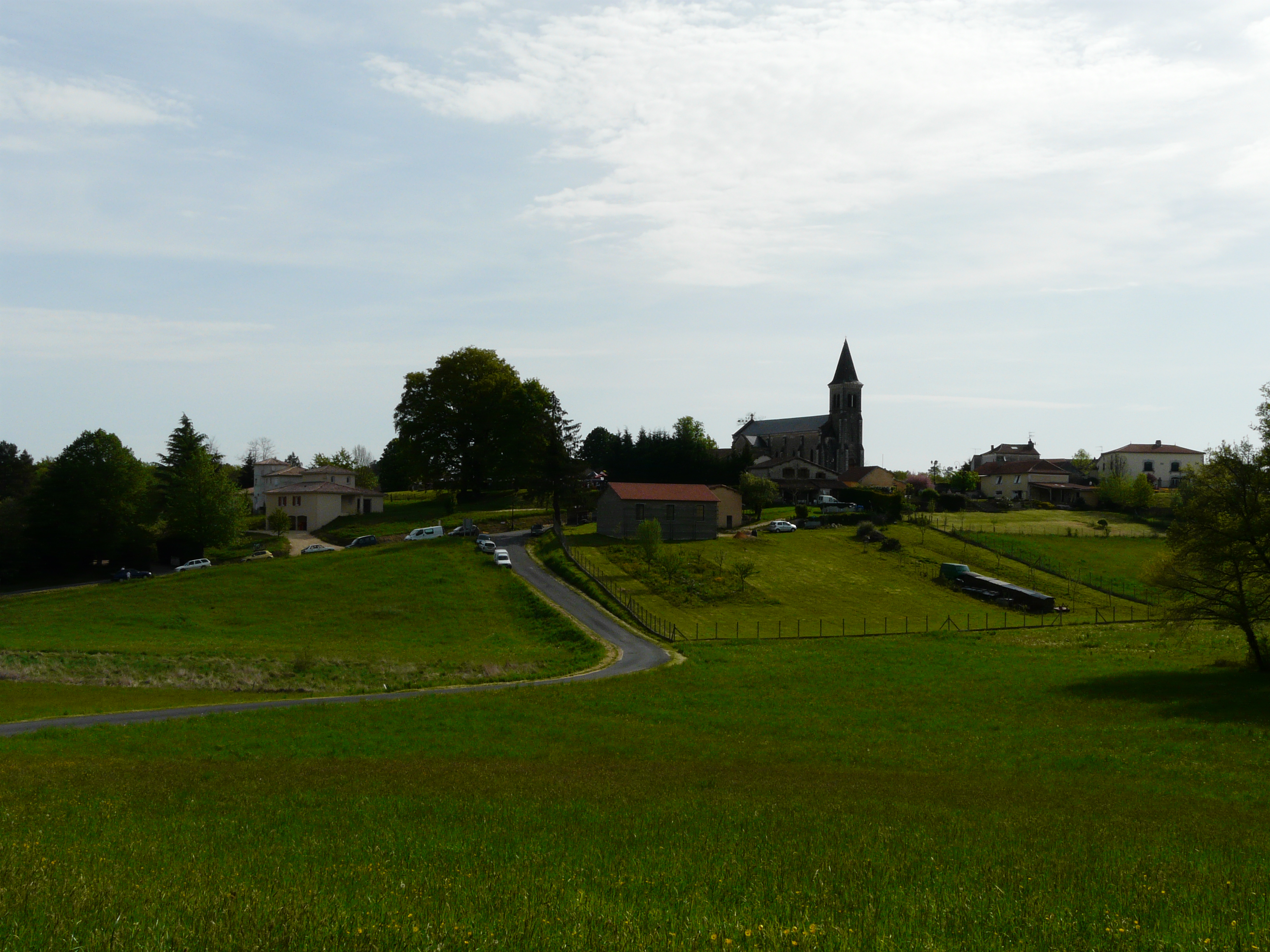
- Location of Marsaneix
- Location within France Location within Nouvelle-Aquitaine
- Coordinates: 45°05′59″N 0°47′07″E
- Country: France
- Region: Nouvelle-Aquitaine
- Department: Dordogne
- Arrondissement: Périgueux
- Canton: Isle-Manoire
- Commune: Sanilhac
- Area^{1}: 23.85 km^{2} (9.21 sq mi)
- Highest elevation: 257 m (843 ft)
- Lowest elevation: 144 m (472 ft)
- Population (2022): 1,156
  - Density: 48.47/km^{2} (125.5/sq mi)
- Time zone: UTC+01:00 (CET)
  - Summer (DST): UTC+02:00 (CEST)
- Postal code: 24750
- ^{1} French Land Register data, which excludes lakes, ponds, glaciers > 1 km^{2} (0.386 sq mi or 247 acres) and river estuaries.

Marsaneix (French pronunciation: [maʁsanɛ]; Occitan: Marçanés) is a former commune in the Dordogne department in Nouvelle-Aquitaine in southwestern France. On 1 January 2017, it was merged into the new commune Sanilhac.

== Population ==
Historical population

| Year | Pop. | ±% p.a. |
|---|---|---|
| 1793 | 694 | — |
| 1800 | 660 | −0.72% |
| 1806 | 758 | +2.33% |
| 1821 | 1,103 | +2.53% |
| 1831 | 984 | −1.14% |
| 1836 | 912 | −1.51% |
| 1841 | 1,012 | +2.10% |
| 1846 | 963 | −0.99% |
| 1851 | 1,005 | +0.86% |
| 1856 | 977 | −0.56% |
| 1861 | 954 | −0.48% |
| 1866 | 922 | −0.68% |
| 1872 | 851 | −1.33% |
| 1876 | 876 | +0.73% |
| 1881 | 867 | −0.21% |
| 1886 | 858 | −0.21% |
| 1891 | 818 | −0.95% |
| 1896 | 747 | −1.80% |

| Year | Pop. | ±% p.a. |
|---|---|---|
| 1901 | 702 | −1.23% |
| 1906 | 716 | +0.40% |
| 1911 | 715 | −0.03% |
| 1921 | 600 | −1.74% |
| 1926 | 593 | −0.23% |
| 1931 | 594 | +0.03% |
| 1936 | 607 | +0.43% |
| 1946 | 528 | −1.38% |
| 1954 | 505 | −0.56% |
| 1962 | 492 | −0.33% |
| 1968 | 476 | −0.55% |
| 1975 | 459 | −0.52% |
| 1982 | 585 | +3.53% |
| 1990 | 726 | +2.74% |
| 1999 | 786 | +0.89% |
| 2006 | 882 | +1.66% |
| 2022 | 1,156 | +1.71% |

Source: EHESS and INSEE

== See also ==
- Communes of the Dordogne department
