= Boulazac =

Commune in Dordogne, France

- Part of Boulazac Isle Manoire
- Location of Boulazac
- Location within France Location within Nouvelle-Aquitaine
- Coordinates: 45°10′19″N 0°46′23″E
- Country: France
- Region: Nouvelle-Aquitaine
- Department: Dordogne
- Arrondissement: Périgueux
- Canton: Isle-Manoire
- Commune: Boulazac Isle Manoire
- Area^{1}: 14.58 km^{2} (5.63 sq mi)
- Highest elevation: 222 m (728 ft)
- Lowest elevation: 83 m (272 ft)
- Population (2022): 7,038
  - Density: 482.7/km^{2} (1,250/sq mi)
- Time zone: UTC+01:00 (CET)
  - Summer (DST): UTC+02:00 (CEST)
- Postal code: 24750
- ^{1} French Land Register data, which excludes lakes, ponds, glaciers > 1 km^{2} (0.386 sq mi or 247 acres) and river estuaries.

Boulazac (French pronunciation: [bulazak]; Limousin: Bolasac) is a former commune in the Dordogne department in southwestern France. On 1 January 2016, it was merged into the new commune Boulazac Isle Manoire.

== Population ==
Historical population

Year	Pop.	±% p.a.
1800	492	—
1806	497	+0.17%
1821	583	+1.07%
1831	630	+0.78%
1836	595	−1.14%
1841	556	−1.35%
1846	604	+1.67%
1851	628	+0.78%
1856	629	+0.03%
1861	694	+1.99%
1866	674	−0.58%
1872	775	+2.35%
1876	780	+0.16%
1881	804	+0.61%
1886	807	+0.07%
1891	784	−0.58%
1896	781	−0.08%

Year	Pop.	±% p.a.
1901	779	−0.05%
1906	770	−0.23%
1911	806	+0.92%
1921	838	+0.39%
1926	1,212	+7.66%
1931	1,402	+2.96%
1936	1,487	+1.18%
1946	2,038	+3.20%
1954	2,337	+1.73%
1962	2,839	+2.46%
1968	3,109	+1.53%
1975	4,557	+5.61%
1982	5,150	+1.76%
1990	5,996	+1.92%
1999	6,050	+0.10%
2006	6,363	+0.72%
2022	7,038	+0.63%

Source: EHESS and INSEE

== Sport ==
The Boulazac Basket Dordogne (BBD) is a French basketball club, based in Boulazac.

== See also ==
- Communes of the Dordogne département

== Sister Cities ==
- Bibbiena, Italy
