= Brasserie Ellezelloise =

Brewery in Ellezelles, Belgium

Ellezelloise brewery (Legende Brewery)
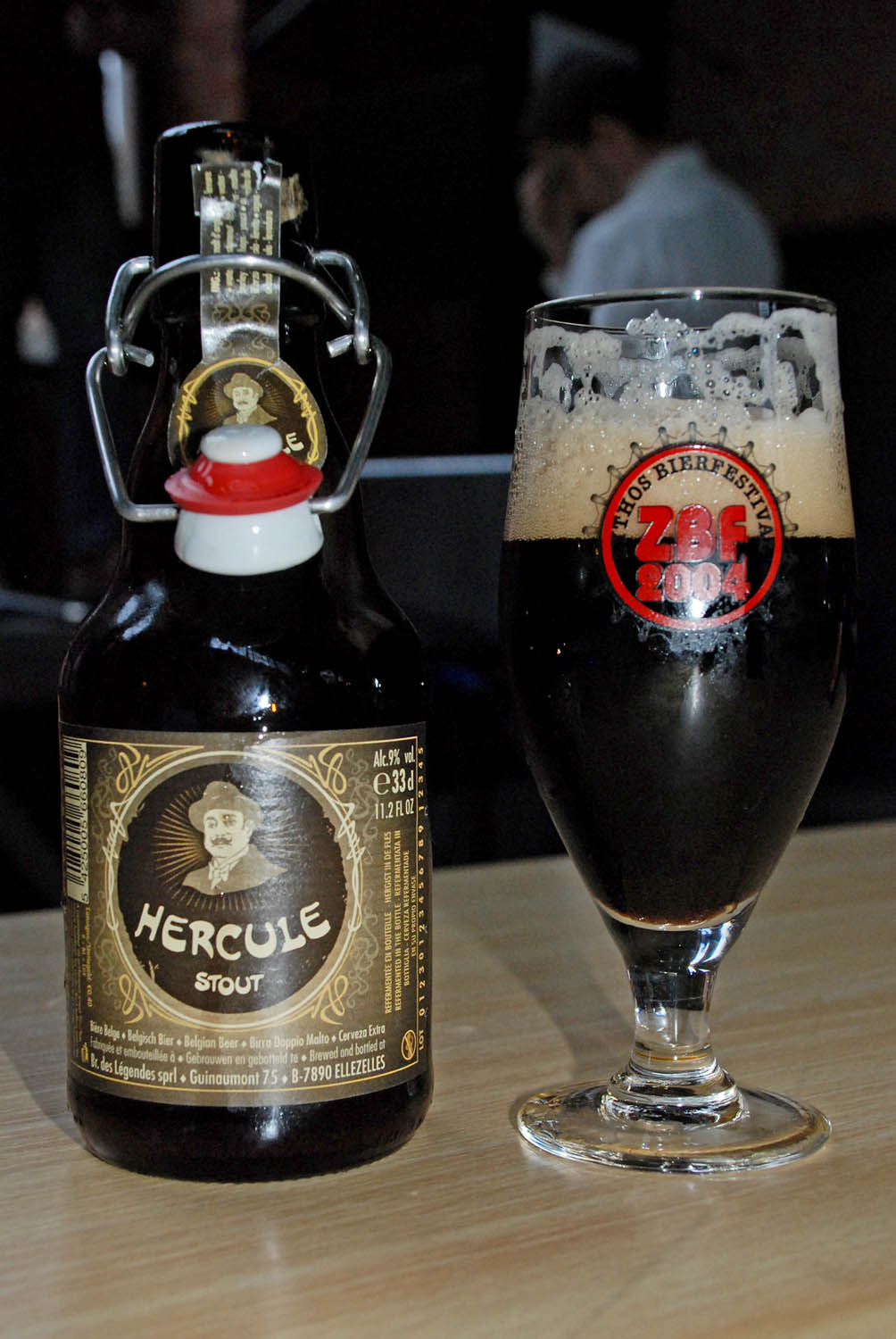
- Hercule Stout
- Interactive map of Ellezelloise brewery (Legende Brewery)
- Location: Ellezelles, Belgium
- Coordinates: 50°44′35″N 3°41′15″E
- Opened: 1993
- Owner: Philippe Gérard
- Website: http://www.brasseriedeslegendes.be/

Active beers
| Name | Type |
| Quitine | blonde |
| Hercule Triple | stout |
| Blanche des saisis | wheat beer |

The Elezelloise brewery is a Belgian company that is located in the village Ellezelles, Hainaut province. It produces several craft beers, among them The Quintine. These beers are named "Beers of the hills" (Bières des collines), a reference to the Pays des collines (hill country) where the brewery is located.

== History ==
In 1993, brewmaster Phillipe Gérard opened his brewery at a small farm in Ellezelles. The first mash of “Quintine” was made on 15 July 1993. “Quintine” is the name of a supposed witch who lived in the village.

In December 2006, the brewer Geants bought the Ellezelloise brewery and renamed it Legende brewery. The two production sites are maintained.

== Beers ==
The brewery's original beers are listed as "Belgian Beer of Wallonia", a protected designation granted by the Wallonian Agency for the Promotion of Quality in Agriculture (APAQ-W).

The Ellezelloise Brewery produces and sells five beers:

- The Quintine Blond: 8% ABV and refermented in the bottle
- The Quintine Pale Ale: 8.5% ABV and made with caramel malt
- The Saison 2000: a pale ale with 6.5% ABV
- The Blanche des Saisis: a white beer with 6.2% ABV
- The "Hercule": a stout with 9% ABV
