= Paul Robert Carrington Abram =

British Anglican priest

The Reverend Paul Abram
- Born: Paul Robert Carrington Abram; 21 July 1936; York, England
- Died: 28 September 2023 (aged 87)
- Education: Hymers College
- Alma mater: Keble College, Oxford
- Occupation: Anglican priest
- Years active: 1962–2006
- Title: Chaplain of the Chapel Royal of St Peter ad Vincula
- Spouse: Joanna Thompson (m. 1961)
- Children: 4
- Military career
- Branch: Royal Army Chaplains' Department
- Service years: 1965–1989
- Rank: Assistant Chaplain-General
- Units: 3rd Battalion, Parachute Regiment
- Awards: MVO (2007)

Paul Robert Carrington Abram (21 July 1936 – 28 September 2023) was a British Anglican priest whose forty-year ministry ranged from parachuting with Airborne troops as the British Army's celebrated "parachuting padre" to serving Elizabeth II as Chaplain and priest-in-charge of the Chapel Royal of St Peter ad Vincula in the Tower of London. A preacher and pastor, he combined a field ministry with parish, maritime and royal chaplaincies, and in 2007 was appointed a Member of the Royal Victorian Order for personal services to the Sovereign.

== Early life and education ==
Abram was born in York, the eldest of five children of the Revd Robert Abram, an Army chaplain, and his wife, Margaret. Wartime postings took the family to Egypt, Aldershot and Germany, giving him a peripatetic childhood. He first attended Hymers College, Hull, aged nine and, after further schooling abroad, returned there in 1954 to complete his A-levels, becoming head of Brandesburton House and an under-officer in the Combined Cadet Force.

Offered a place at Keble College, Oxford, he deferred to fulfil National Service with the East Yorkshire Regiment, commissioning as a lieutenant and qualifying as a military parachutist. He matriculated at Keble in 1957, reading Geography and Law, and completed his MA in 1960. Theological formation at Chichester Theological College followed; he was ordained deacon in 1962 and priest in 1963.

== Career ==
Abram served his title post as Assistant Curate of Christ Church, Redcar (1962–65). In May 1965, he rejoined the Army as a Chaplain to the Forces, 4th Class, beginning a 24-year career with the Royal Army Chaplains' Department. Attached to 3 PARA from 1966, he accompanied the battalion to Australia, Libya, Malta and Cyprus, ultimately logging at least 78 parachute jumps and rising to Assistant Chaplain-General.

Leaving the Army in 1989, Abram became Vicar of Holy Trinity, Salcombe, Devon (1989–96). He spearheaded a long-standing appeal to provide the church with its first ring of bells. Concurrently, he was chaplain to the Mission to Seafarers (1989–2000) and its successor charity (2000–23), ministering to crews in South-West ports.

In 1996, Abram was appointed Chaplain of St Peter ad Vincula at HM Tower of London and Deputy Priest-in-Ordinary to the Queen, posts he held for a decade. He conducted services in the White Tower, advised the Yeoman Warders, and welcomed veterans and royal visitors alike until retiring in 2006.

== Personal life ==
Abram married Joanna (“Jo”) Thompson at the Royal Hospital Chelsea in 1961; the couple had four daughters. After retiring he lived in Kimpton, Hampshire, and later Odiham, remaining active in Airborne Forces pilgrimages until ill-health intervened. He died of cardiac failure on 28 September 2023, aged 87.

== Honours ==
- Member of the Royal Victorian Order (MVO), 2007 Birthday Honours, for personal services to the Sovereign.
