= Boulazac Isle Manoire =

Boulazac Isle Manoire Bolasac Eila Manoire (Occitan)
- Commune
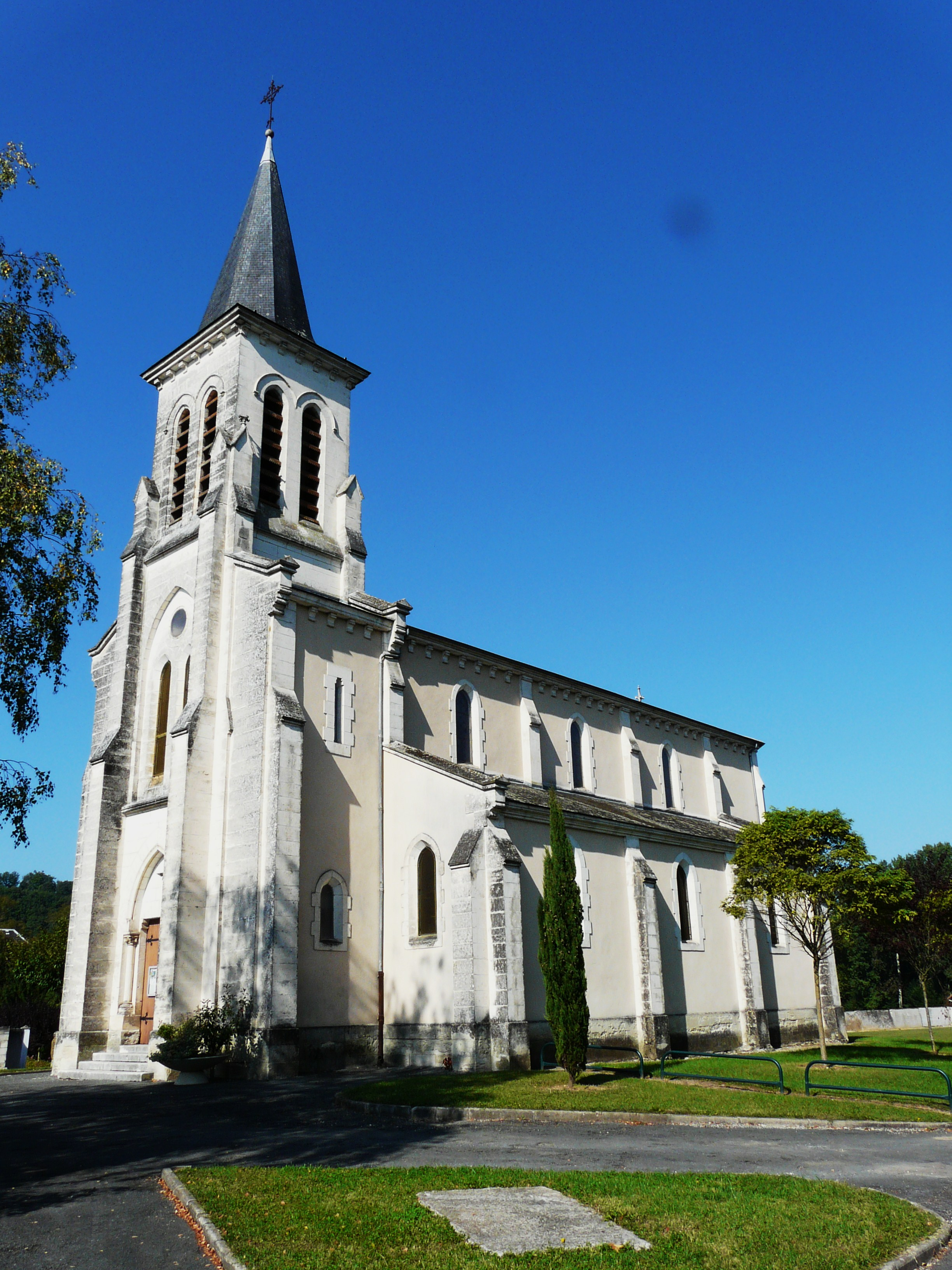
- The church in Boulazac
- Location of Boulazac Isle Manoire
- Location within France Location within Nouvelle-Aquitaine
- Coordinates: 45°10′55″N 0°45′47″E
- Country: France
- Region: Nouvelle-Aquitaine
- Department: Dordogne
- Arrondissement: Périgueux
- Canton: Isle-Manoire
- Intercommunality: Le Grand Périgueux

Government
  - Mayor (2024–2026): Fanny Castaignede
- Area^{1}: 55.95 km^{2} (21.60 sq mi)
- Population (2023): 10,759
  - Density: 192.3/km^{2} (498.0/sq mi)
- Time zone: UTC+01:00 (CET)
  - Summer (DST): UTC+02:00 (CEST)
- INSEE/Postal code: 24053 /24750, 24330
- ^{1} French Land Register data, which excludes lakes, ponds, glaciers > 1 km^{2} (0.386 sq mi or 247 acres) and river estuaries.

Boulazac Isle Manoire (French pronunciation: [bulazak il manwaʁ]; Limousin: Bolasac Eila Manoire) is a commune in the Dordogne department of southwestern France. The municipality was established on 1 January 2016 and consists of the former communes of Boulazac, Atur and Saint-Laurent-sur-Manoire. On 1 January 2017, the former commune of Sainte-Marie-de-Chignac was merged into Boulazac Isle Manoire. Niversac station, in Saint-Laurent-sur-Manoire, has rail connections to Bordeaux, Périgueux, Brive-la-Gaillarde and Agen.

== Population ==
Historical population
Year	Pop.	±% p.a.
1968	4,334	—
1975	6,203	+5.26%
1982	7,101	+1.95%
1990	8,341	+2.03%
1999	8,764	+0.55%
2007	9,825	+1.44%
2012	10,172	+0.70%
2017	10,635	+0.89%
2023	10,759	+0.19%
Populations of the area corresponding with the commune of Boulazac Isle Manoire at 1 January 2025. Source: INSEE

== See also ==
- Communes of the Dordogne department
