= Saint-Laurent-sur-Manoire =

- Part of Boulazac Isle Manoire
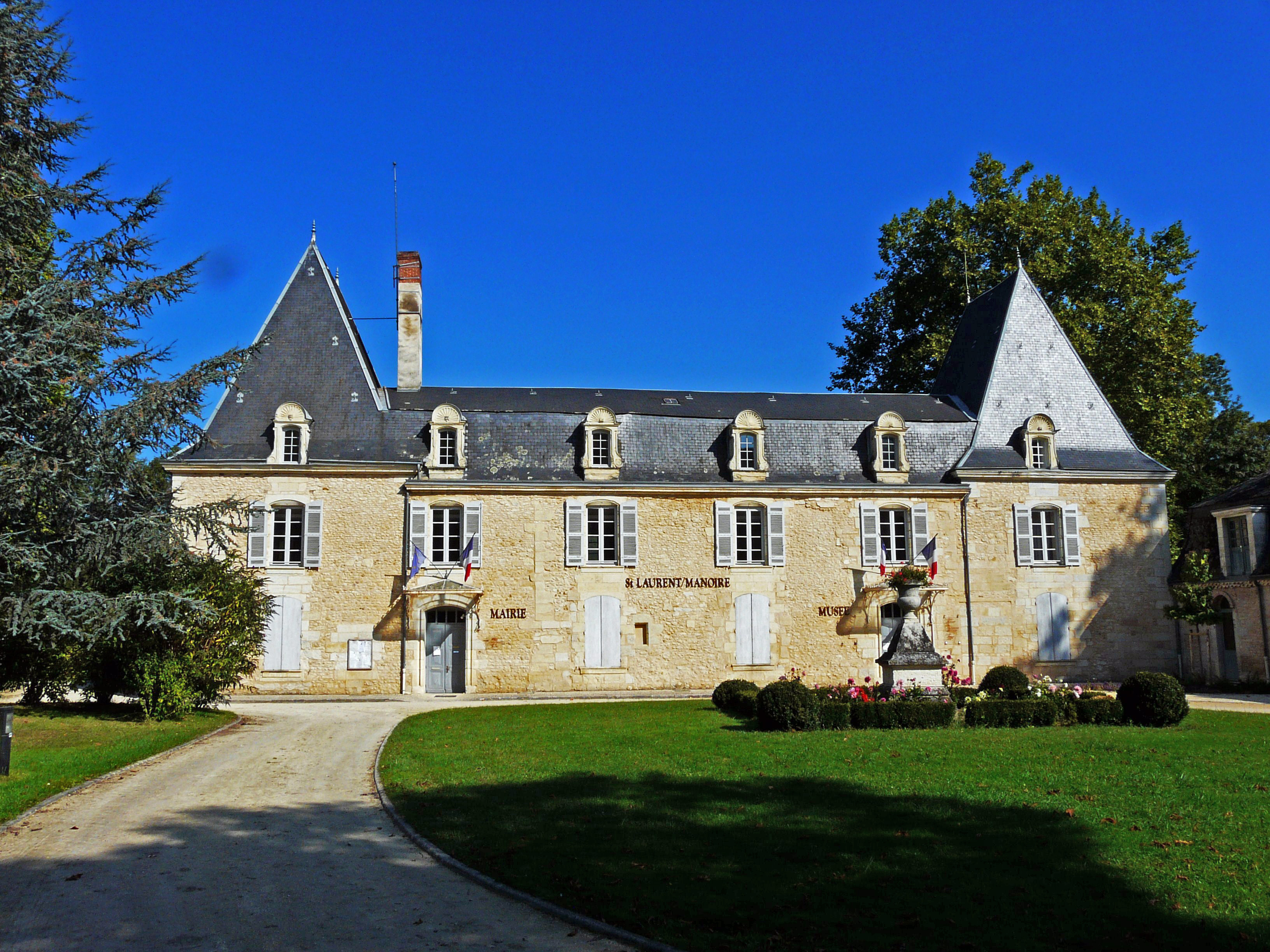
- Town hall and museum
- Location of Saint-Laurent-sur-Manoire
- Location within France Location within Nouvelle-Aquitaine
- Coordinates: 45°08′55″N 0°47′46″E
- Country: France
- Region: Nouvelle-Aquitaine
- Department: Dordogne
- Arrondissement: Périgueux
- Canton: Isle-Manoire
- Commune: Boulazac Isle Manoire
- Area^{1}: 10.44 km^{2} (4.03 sq mi)
- Elevation: 110 m (360 ft)
- Highest elevation: 261 m (856 ft)
- Lowest elevation: 100 m (330 ft)
- Population (2022): 1,078
  - Density: 103.3/km^{2} (267.4/sq mi)
- Time zone: UTC+01:00 (CET)
  - Summer (DST): UTC+02:00 (CEST)
- Postal code: 24330
- ^{1} French Land Register data, which excludes lakes, ponds, glaciers > 1 km^{2} (0.386 sq mi or 247 acres) and river estuaries.

Saint-Laurent-sur-Manoire (French pronunciation: [sɛ̃ loʁɑ̃ syʁ manwaʁ]; Limousin: Sent Laurenç de Manoire) is a former commune in the Dordogne department in southwestern France. On 1 January 2016, it was merged into the new commune Boulazac Isle Manoire.

== Population ==
Historical population

Year	Pop.	±% p.a.
1793	419	—
1800	370	−1.76%
1806	380	+0.45%
1821	417	+0.62%
1831	466	+1.12%
1836	416	−2.24%
1841	430	+0.66%
1846	463	+1.49%
1851	460	−0.13%
1856	417	−1.94%
1861	420	+0.14%
1866	527	+4.64%
1872	522	−0.16%
1876	533	+0.52%
1881	478	−2.15%
1886	508	+1.22%
1891	510	+0.08%

Year	Pop.	±% p.a.
1896	453	−2.34%
1901	423	−1.36%
1906	412	−0.53%
1911	419	+0.34%
1921	345	−1.92%
1926	366	+1.19%
1931	370	+0.22%
1936	326	−2.50%
1946	347	+0.63%
1954	354	+0.25%
1962	377	+0.79%
1968	397	+0.87%
1975	535	+4.35%
1982	568	+0.86%
1990	706	+2.76%
1999	765	+0.90%
2022	1,078	+1.50%

Source: EHESS and INSEE

== See also ==
- Communes of the Dordogne department
