= Notre-Dame-de-Sanilhac =

- Part of Sanilhac
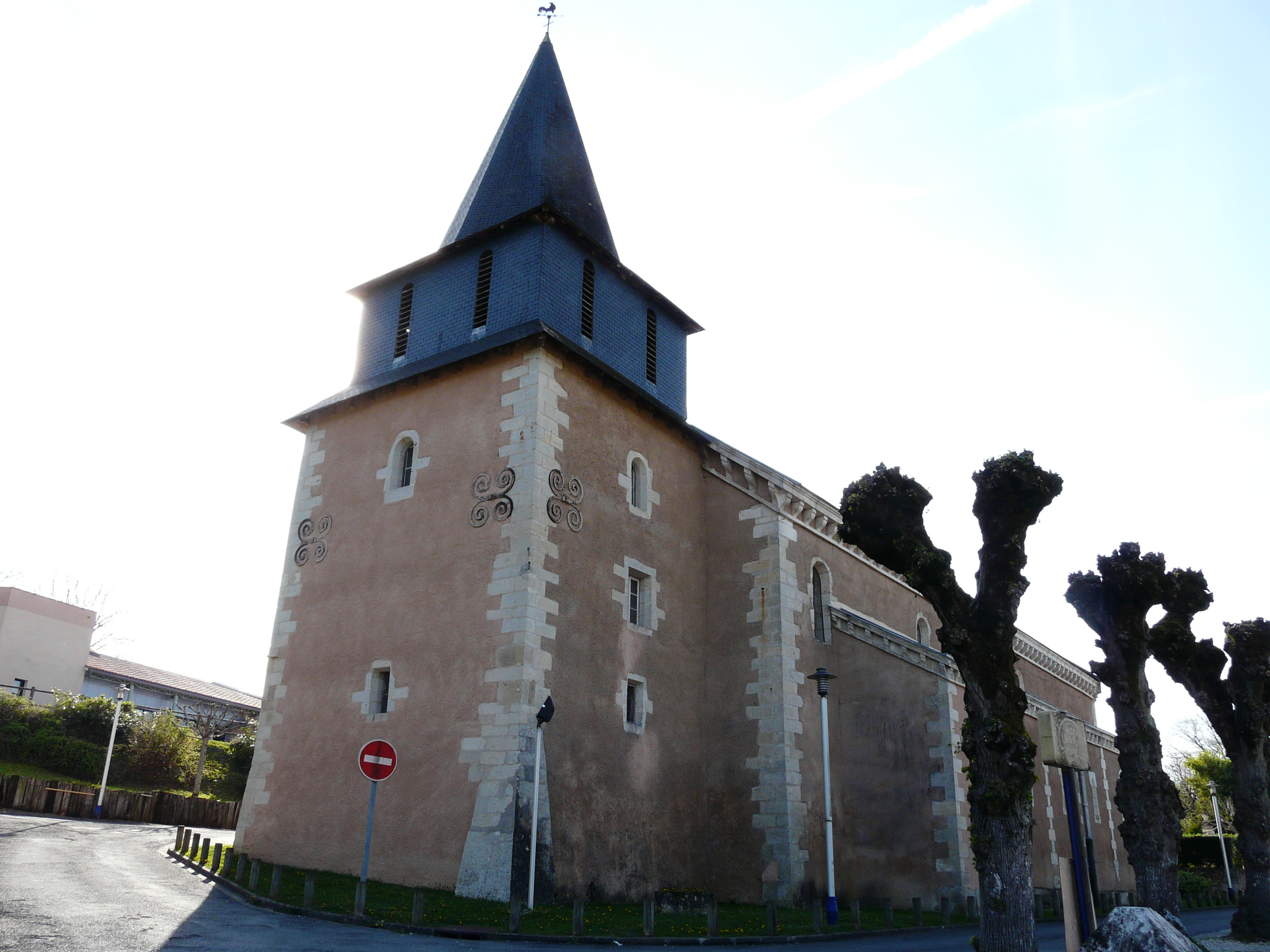
- Location of Notre-Dame-de-Sanilhac
- Location within France Location within Nouvelle-Aquitaine
- Coordinates: 45°07′21″N 0°42′53″E
- Country: France
- Region: Nouvelle-Aquitaine
- Department: Dordogne
- Arrondissement: Périgueux
- Canton: Isle-Manoire
- Commune: Sanilhac
- Area^{1}: 25.79 km^{2} (9.96 sq mi)
- Elevation: 138 m (453 ft)
- Highest elevation: 240 m (790 ft)
- Lowest elevation: 85 m (279 ft)
- Population (2022): 3,290
  - Density: 128/km^{2} (330/sq mi)
- Time zone: UTC+01:00 (CET)
  - Summer (DST): UTC+02:00 (CEST)
- Postal code: 24660
- ^{1} French Land Register data, which excludes lakes, ponds, glaciers > 1 km^{2} (0.386 sq mi or 247 acres) and river estuaries.

Notre-Dame-de-Sanilhac (French pronunciation: [nɔtʁə dam də sanijak]; Occitan: Nòstra Dama de Sanilhac) is a former commune in the Dordogne department in Nouvelle-Aquitaine in southwestern France. On 1 January 2017, it was merged into the new commune Sanilhac.

== Population ==
Historical population

Year	Pop.	±% p.a.
1831	1,037	—
1836	1,015	−0.43%
1841	1,106	+1.73%
1846	1,078	−0.51%
1851	1,211	+2.35%
1856	1,256	+0.73%
1861	1,259	+0.05%
1866	1,285	+0.41%
1872	1,286	+0.01%
1876	1,385	+1.87%
1881	1,464	+1.12%
1886	1,509	+0.61%
1891	1,518	+0.12%
1896	1,511	−0.09%
1901	1,411	−1.36%
1906	1,292	−1.75%

Year	Pop.	±% p.a.
1911	1,285	−0.11%
1921	1,224	−0.49%
1926	1,218	−0.10%
1931	1,152	−1.11%
1936	1,214	+1.05%
1946	1,276	+0.50%
1954	1,277	+0.01%
1962	1,760	+4.09%
1968	1,927	+1.52%
1975	2,062	+0.97%
1982	2,220	+1.06%
1990	2,577	+1.88%
1999	2,617	+0.17%
2006	2,725	+0.58%
2022	3,290	+1.18%

Source: EHESS and INSEE

== See also ==
- Communes of the Dordogne department
