= Saint-Crépin-d'Auberoche =

- Commune
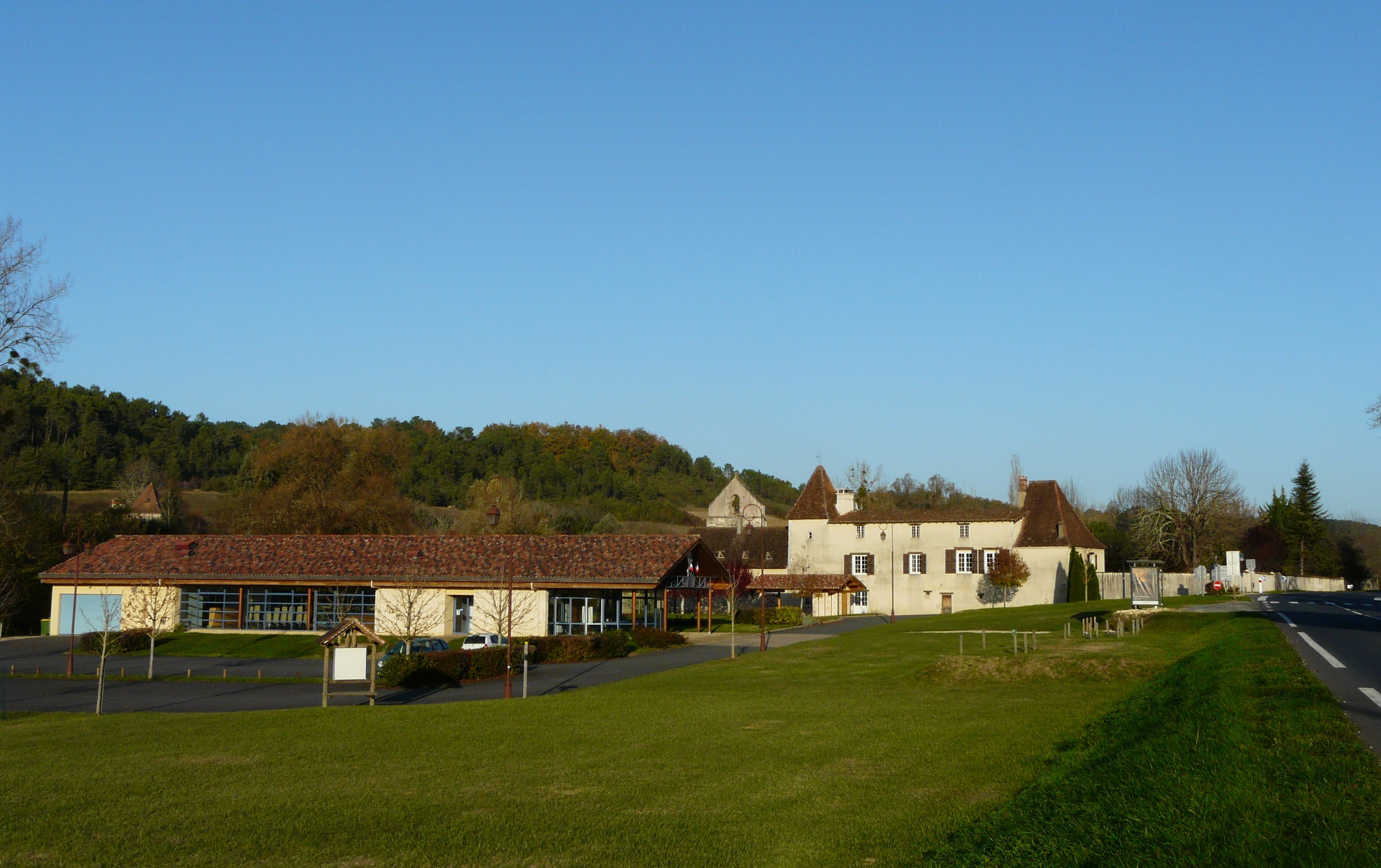
- A general view of Saint-Crépin-d'Auberoche
- Location of Saint-Crépin-d'Auberoche
- Location within France Location within Nouvelle-Aquitaine
- Coordinates: 45°07′28″N 0°53′26″E
- Country: France
- Region: Nouvelle-Aquitaine
- Department: Dordogne
- Arrondissement: Périgueux
- Canton: Isle-Manoire
- Intercommunality: Le Grand Périgueux

Government
  - Mayor (2020–2026): Clovis Tallet
- Area^{1}: 9.56 km^{2} (3.69 sq mi)
- Elevation: 149 m (489 ft)
- Highest elevation: 241 m (791 ft)
- Lowest elevation: 140 m (460 ft)
- Population (2023): 335
  - Density: 35.0/km^{2} (90.8/sq mi)
- Time zone: UTC+01:00 (CET)
  - Summer (DST): UTC+02:00 (CEST)
- INSEE/Postal code: 24390 /24330
- ^{1} French Land Register data, which excludes lakes, ponds, glaciers > 1 km^{2} (0.386 sq mi or 247 acres) and river estuaries.

Saint-Crépin-d'Auberoche (French pronunciation: [sɛ̃ kʁepɛ̃ dobʁɔʃ]; Occitan: Sent Crespin d'Aubaròcha) is a commune in the Dordogne department in Nouvelle-Aquitaine in southwestern France.

== Population ==
Historical population
Year	Pop.	±% p.a.
1968	191	—
1975	175	−1.24%
1982	237	+4.43%
1990	229	−0.43%
1999	227	−0.10%
2007	276	+2.47%
2012	294	+1.27%
2017	356	+3.90%
2023	335	−1.01%
Source: INSEE

== See also ==
- Communes of the Dordogne department
