= List of protected heritage sites in Ellezelles =

This table shows an overview of the protected heritage sites in the Walloon town Ellezelles. This list is part of Belgium's national heritage.

Object	Year/architect	Town/section	Address	Coordinates	Number^{?}	Image
Mill of Nespelier, rue Camp et Haies n ° 15 to Ellezelles ^{(nl)} ^{(fr)}		Elzele		50.726334°N 3.673258°E	51017-CLT-0001-01 Info	Molen van Nespelier, rue Camp et haies n° 15 te Ellezelles
Mill "Chat sauvage" in Ellezelles ^{(nl)} ^{(fr)}		Elzele		50.732124°N 3.646034°E	51017-CLT-0002-01 Info	Molen van "Chat sauvage" te Ellezelles
Ensemble formed by the mill Chat sauvage and the environment, in Ellezelles ^{(nl)} ^{(fr)}		Elzele		50.731814°N 3.644304°E	51017-CLT-0003-01 Info	
Church Saint-Pierre-aux-Liens, in Ellezelles ^{(nl)} ^{(fr)}		Elzele		50.734046°N 3.680903°E	51017-CLT-0004-01 Info	Kerk ('Saint-Pierre-aux-Liens'), te Ellezelles
The waterwheel of the Moulin de Mouflu ^{(nl)} ^{(fr)}		Elzele	rue Quesnoit, à Ellezelles	50.718361°N 3.753822°E	51017-CLT-0007-01 Info	
Chapel Notre-Dame de la Paix, in Padraye and ensemble formed by the building and its surroundings ^{(nl)} ^{(fr)}		Elzele		50.730105°N 3.697690°E	51017-CLT-0008-01 Info	Kapel Notre-Dame de la Paix, te Padraye en ensemble gevormd door het gebouw en zijn omgeving
Barn, Chaussee n ° 11 ^{(nl)} ^{(fr)}		Elzele		50.710123°N 3.720412°E	51017-CLT-0009-01 Info	

== See also ==
- List of protected heritage sites in Hainaut (province)
- Ellezelles
