= Breuilh =

- Part of Sanilhac
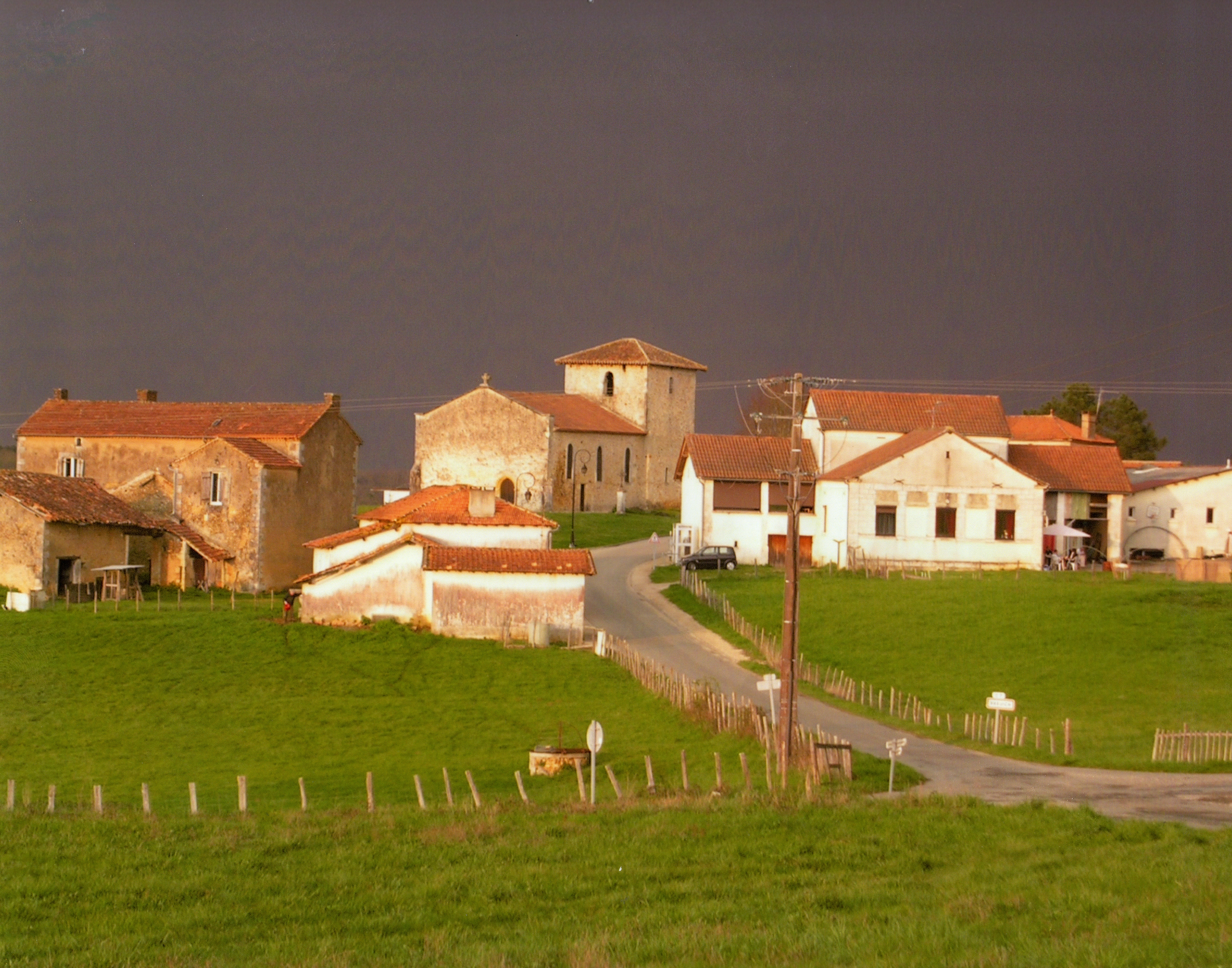
- Location of Breuilh
- Location within France Location within Nouvelle-Aquitaine
- Coordinates: 45°03′28″N 0°45′18″E
- Country: France
- Region: Nouvelle-Aquitaine
- Department: Dordogne
- Arrondissement: Périgueux
- Canton: Périgord central
- Commune: Sanilhac
- Area^{1}: 10.26 km^{2} (3.96 sq mi)
- Elevation: 250 m (820 ft)
- Highest elevation: 246 m (807 ft)
- Lowest elevation: 144 m (472 ft)
- Population (2023): 258
  - Density: 25.1/km^{2} (65.1/sq mi)
- Time zone: UTC+01:00 (CET)
  - Summer (DST): UTC+02:00 (CEST)
- Postal code: 24380
- ^{1} French Land Register data, which excludes lakes, ponds, glaciers > 1 km^{2} (0.386 sq mi or 247 acres) and river estuaries.

Breuilh (French pronunciation: [bʁœj]; Occitan: Bruelh) is a former commune in the Dordogne department in southwestern France. On 1 January 2017, it was merged into the new commune Sanilhac.

== See also ==
- Communes of the Dordogne department
