= Saint-Geyrac =

- Commune
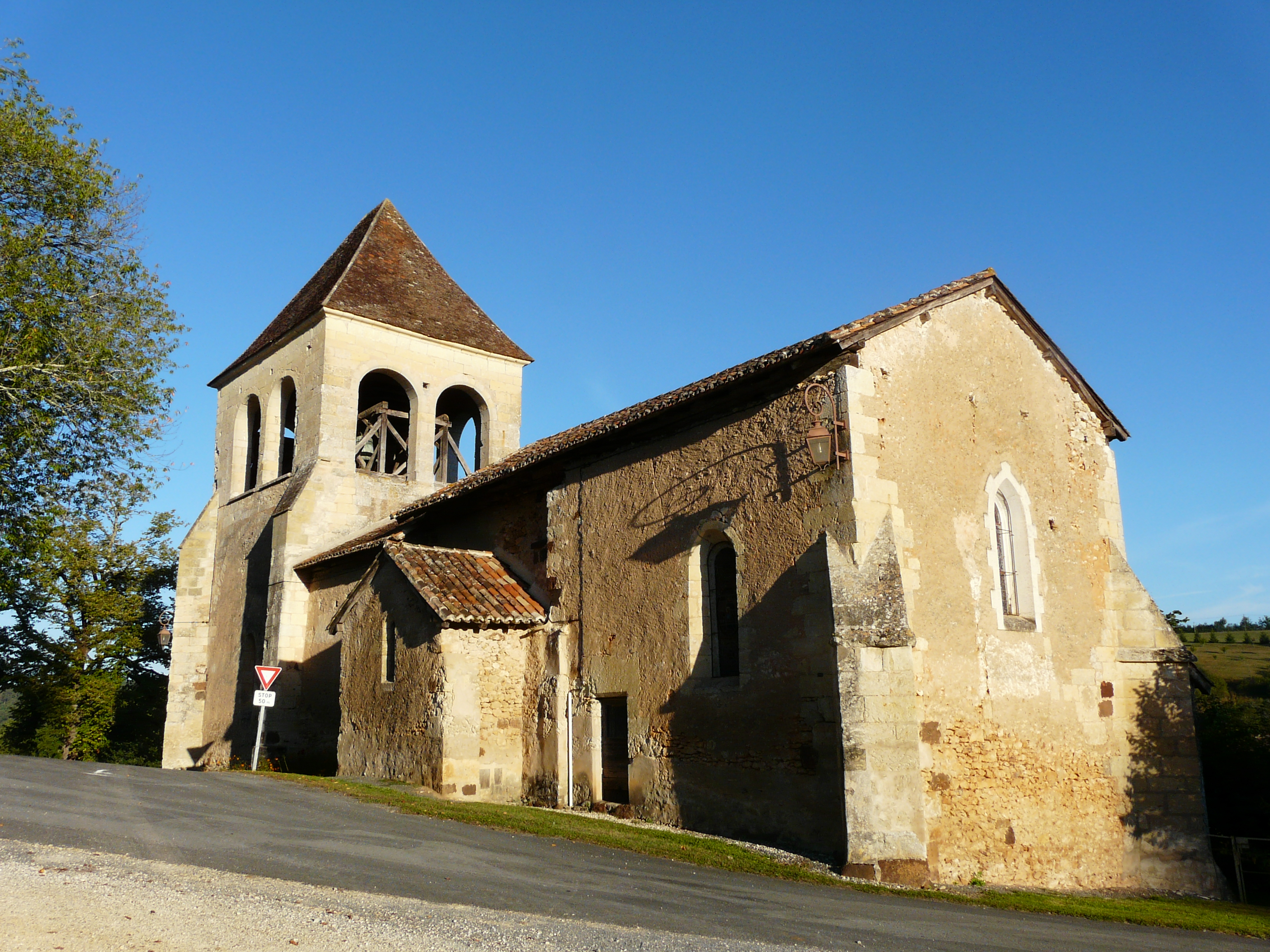
- The church in Saint-Geyrac
- Location of Saint-Geyrac
- Location within France Location within Nouvelle-Aquitaine
- Coordinates: 45°05′20″N 0°54′55″E
- Country: France
- Region: Nouvelle-Aquitaine
- Department: Dordogne
- Arrondissement: Périgueux
- Canton: Isle-Manoire
- Intercommunality: Le Grand Périgueux

Government
  - Mayor (2020–2026): Nils Fouchier
- Area^{1}: 17.10 km^{2} (6.60 sq mi)
- Elevation: 176 m (577 ft)
- Highest elevation: 257 m (843 ft)
- Lowest elevation: 153 m (502 ft)
- Population (2023): 197
  - Density: 11.5/km^{2} (29.8/sq mi)
- Time zone: UTC+01:00 (CET)
  - Summer (DST): UTC+02:00 (CEST)
- INSEE/Postal code: 24421 /24330
- ^{1} French Land Register data, which excludes lakes, ponds, glaciers > 1 km^{2} (0.386 sq mi or 247 acres) and river estuaries.

Saint-Geyrac (French pronunciation: [sɛ̃ ʒeʁak]; Occitan: Sengeirac) is a commune in the Dordogne department in Nouvelle-Aquitaine in southwestern France.

== Population ==
Historical population
Year	Pop.	±% p.a.
1968	253	—
1975	244	−0.52%
1982	235	−0.54%
1990	212	−1.28%
1999	199	−0.70%
2007	228	+1.72%
2012	233	+0.43%
2017	198	−3.20%
2023	197	−0.08%
Source: INSEE

== See also ==
- Communes of the Dordogne department
