= Sanilhac, Dordogne =

Sanilhac
- Commune
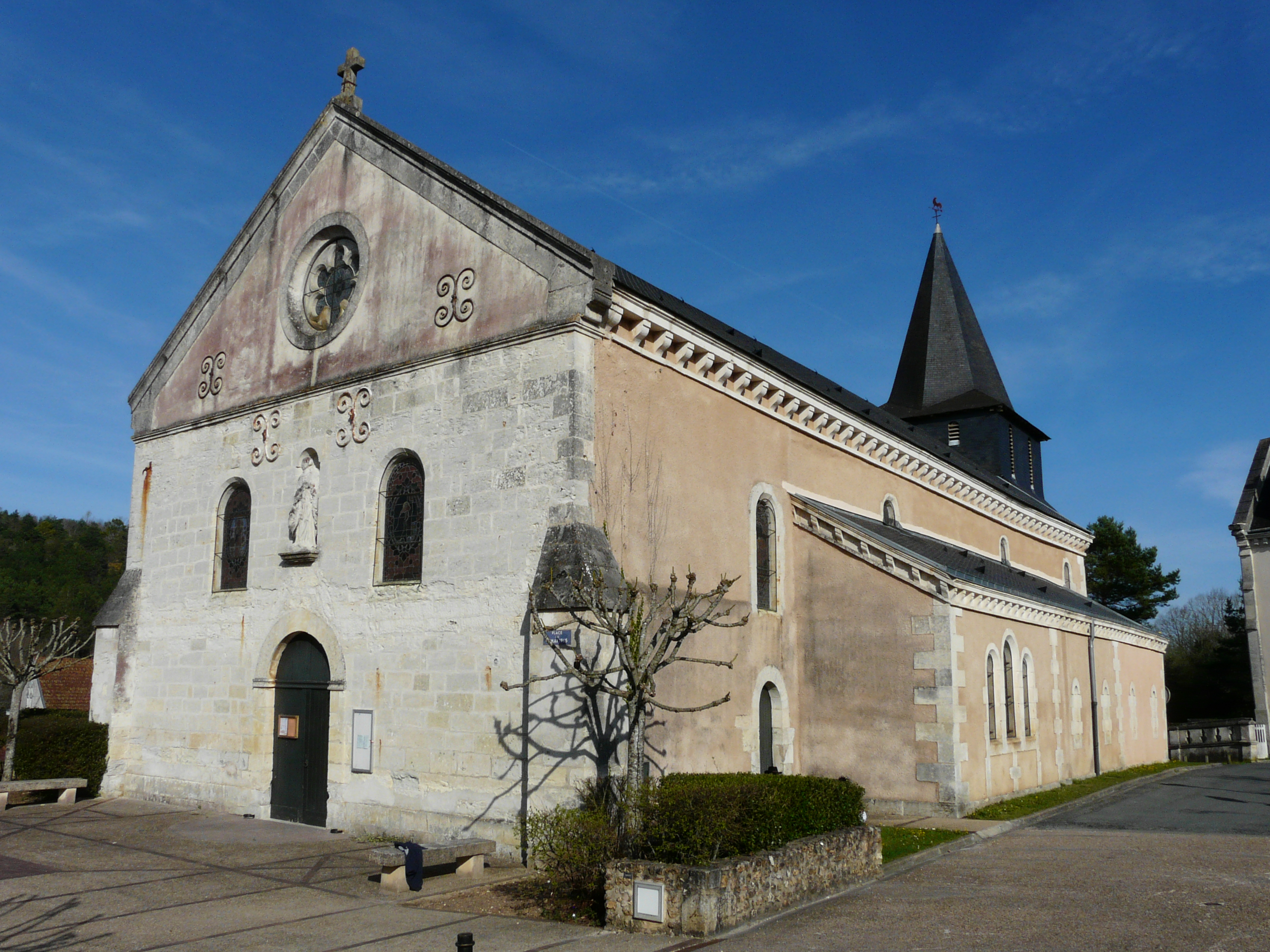
- The church in Notre-Dame-de-Sanilhac
- Location of Sanilhac
- Location within France Location within Nouvelle-Aquitaine
- Coordinates: 45°07′19″N 0°42′50″E
- Country: France
- Region: Nouvelle-Aquitaine
- Department: Dordogne
- Arrondissement: Périgueux
- Canton: Isle-Manoire and Périgord Central
- Intercommunality: Le Grand Périgueux

Government
  - Mayor (2020–2026): Jean-Louis Amelin
- Area^{1}: 59.90 km^{2} (23.13 sq mi)
- Population (2023): 4,757
  - Density: 79.42/km^{2} (205.7/sq mi)
- Time zone: UTC+01:00 (CET)
  - Summer (DST): UTC+02:00 (CEST)
- INSEE/Postal code: 24312 /24660
- ^{1} French Land Register data, which excludes lakes, ponds, glaciers > 1 km^{2} (0.386 sq mi or 247 acres) and river estuaries.

Sanilhac (French pronunciation: [sanijak]) is a commune in the department of Dordogne, southwestern France. The municipality was established on 1 January 2017 by merger of the former communes of Notre-Dame-de-Sanilhac (the seat), Breuilh and Marsaneix.

== Population ==
Population data refer to the commune in its geography as of January 2025.

Historical population
Year	Pop.	±% p.a.
1968	2,528	—
1975	2,644	+0.64%
1982	2,928	+1.47%
1990	3,464	+2.12%
1999	3,602	+0.44%
2007	4,052	+1.48%
2012	4,396	+1.64%
2017	4,548	+0.68%
2023	4,757	+0.75%
Source: INSEE

== See also ==
- Communes of the Dordogne department
