= Saint-Pierre-de-Chignac station =

Railway station in Saint-Pierre-de-Chignac, France

Coordinates: 45°07′24″N 0°51′22″E

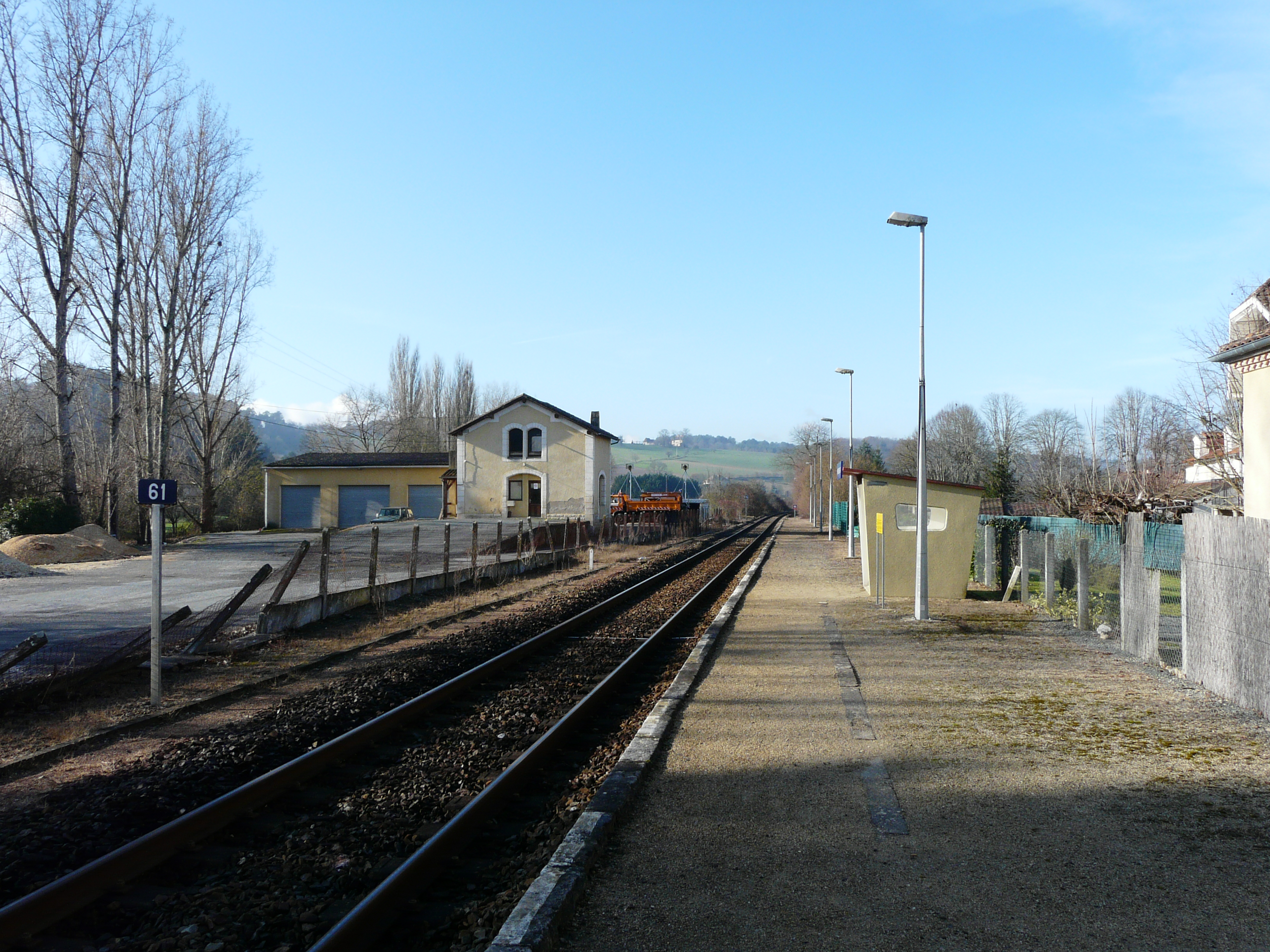
Saint-Pierre-de-Chignac station

Saint-Pierre-de-Chignac is a railway station in Saint-Pierre-de-Chignac, Nouvelle-Aquitaine, France. The station is located on the Coutras–Tulle railway line. The station is served by TER (local) services operated by SNCF.

== Train services ==
The station is served by regional trains towards Bordeaux, Périgueux and Brive-la-Gaillarde.

Preceding station	TER Nouvelle-Aquitaine	Following station
Niversac towards Bordeaux	32	Thenon towards Ussel
