= Niversac station =

Railway station in Saint-Laurent-sur-Manoire, France

Coordinates: 45°08′18″N 0°48′29″E

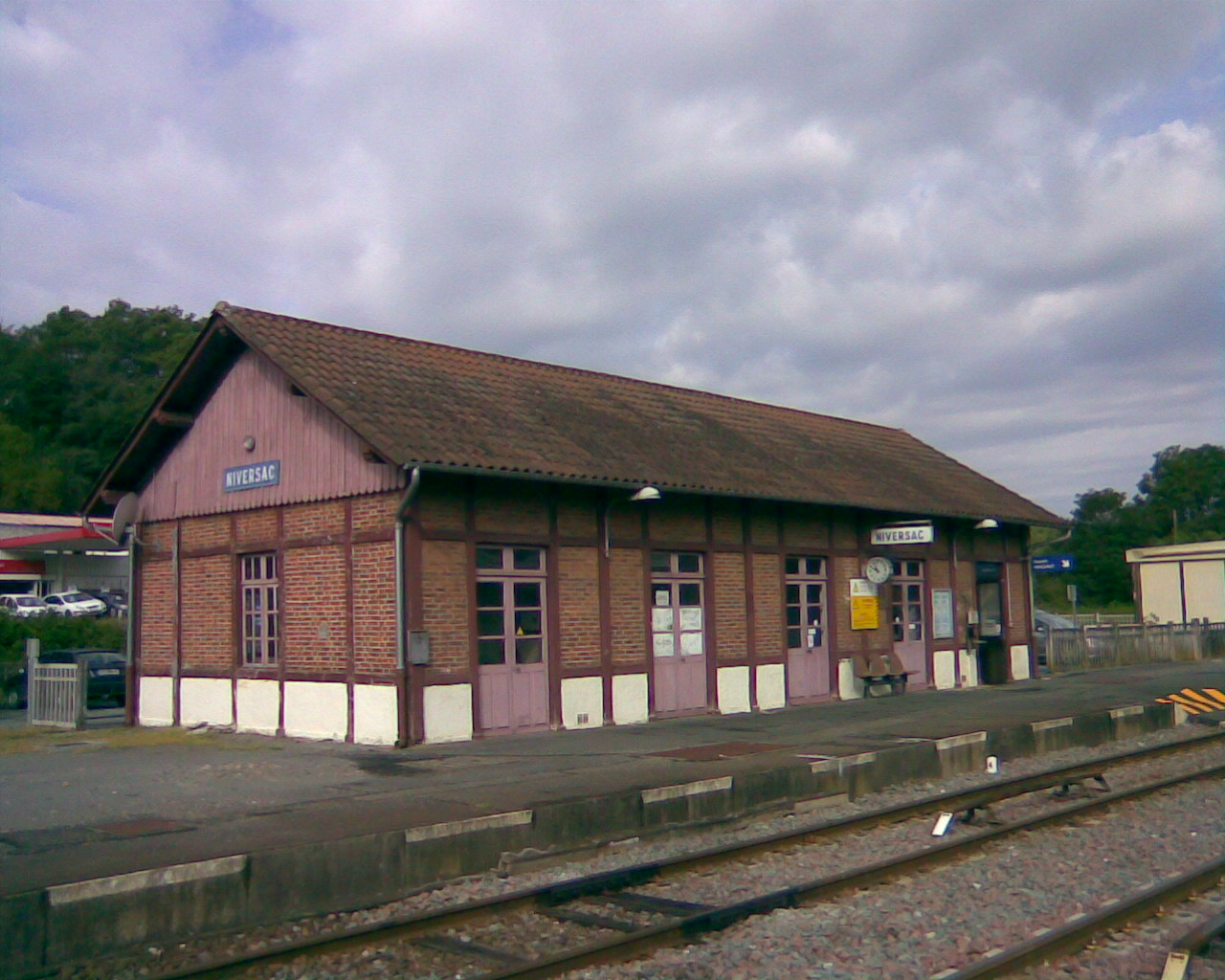
Niversac station

Niversac is a railway station in Saint-Laurent-sur-Manoire, Nouvelle-Aquitaine, France. The station is located on the Coutras - Tulle and Niversac - Agen railway lines. The station is served by TER (local) services operated by SNCF.

== Station History ==
The station building is a brick structure with half-timbering adorning the walls. It is the sole surviving example of "an architecture desired at the time by the Compagnie du chemin de fer Paris-Orléans". The station opened in 1860 and is located at the starting point of the Périgueux – Brive and Périgueux – Agen rail lines.

== Train services ==
The station is served by regional trains to Bordeaux, Périgueux, Brive-la-Gaillarde and Agen.

Preceding station	TER Nouvelle-Aquitaine	Following station
Boulazac towards Bordeaux	32	Saint-Pierre-de-Chignac towards Ussel
Boulazac towards Périgueux	34	Les Versannes towards Agen or Sarlat-la-Canéda
