= Les Versannes station =

Railway station in La Douze, France

Coordinates: 45°05′19″N 0°51′27″E

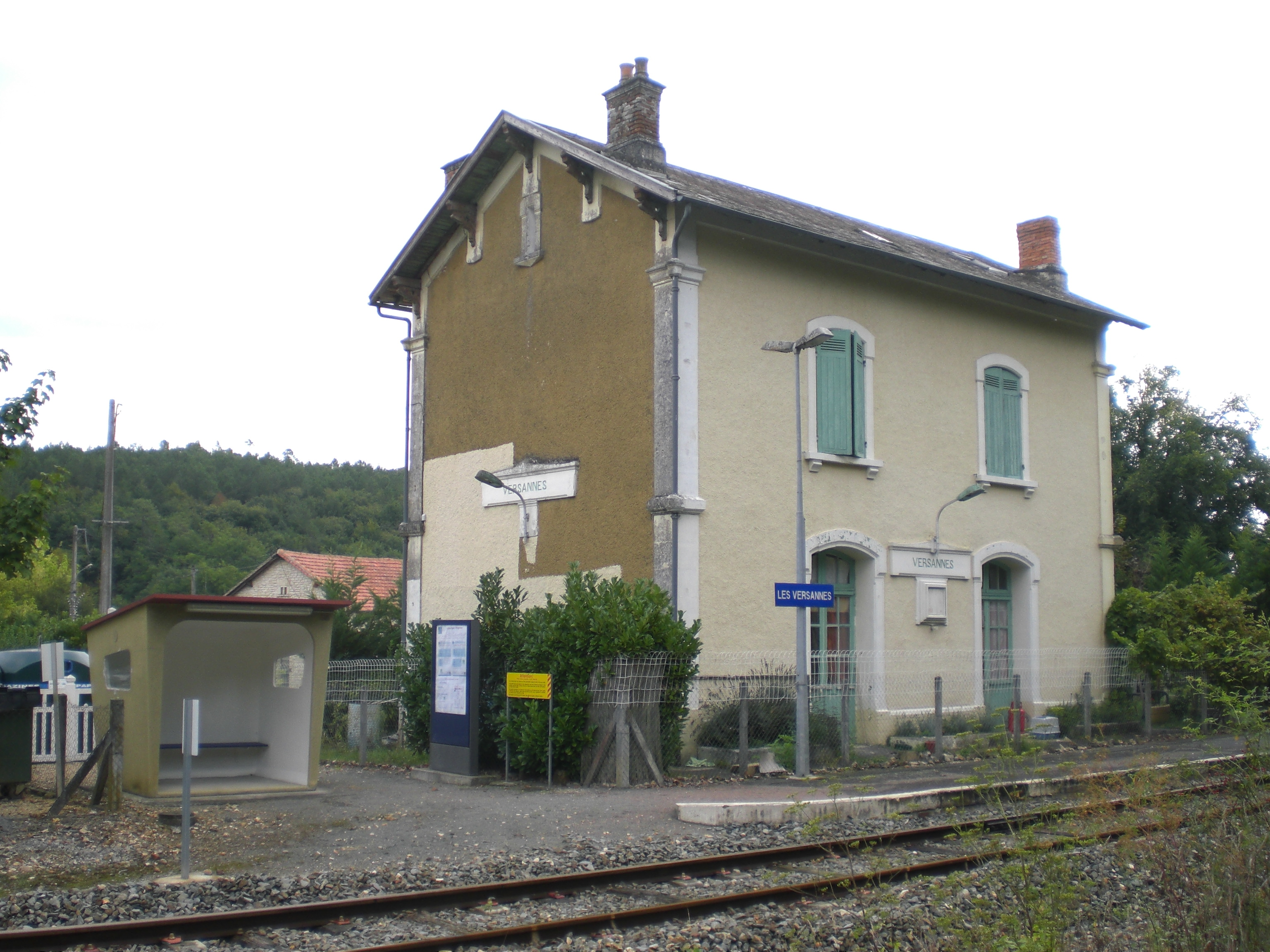
Versannes station

Les Versannes is a railway station in La Douze, Nouvelle-Aquitaine, France. The station is located on the Niversac - Agen railway line. The station is served by TER (local) services operated by SNCF.

== Train services ==
The following services currently call at Les Versannes:

- local service (TER Nouvelle-Aquitaine) Périgueux - Le Buisson - Monsempron-Libos - Agen

Preceding station	TER Nouvelle-Aquitaine	Following station
Niversac towards Périgueux	34	Les Eyzies towards Agen or Sarlat-la-Canéda
