= Thenon station =

Railway station in Thenon, France

Coordinates: 45°09′36″N 1°04′08″E

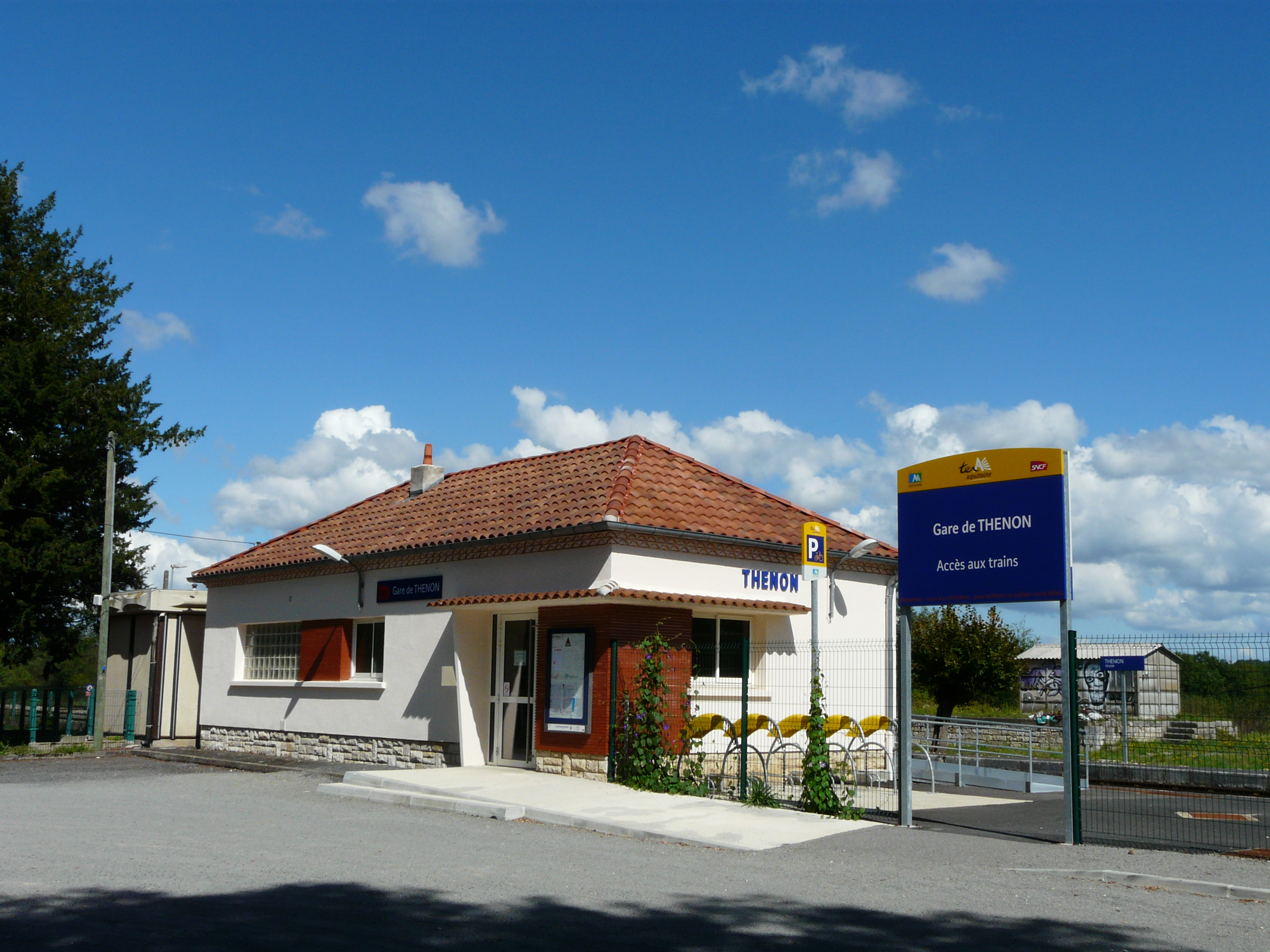
Thenon gare Station

Thenon is a railway station 2 km north of Thenon, Nouvelle-Aquitaine, France. The station is located on the Coutras - Tulle railway line. The station is served by TER (local) services operated by SNCF.

== Train services ==
The station is served by regional trains towards Bordeaux, Périgueux and Brive-la-Gaillarde.

Preceding station	TER Nouvelle-Aquitaine	Following station
Saint-Pierre-de-Chignac towards Bordeaux	32	Condat-Le Lardin towards Ussel
