= Atur, Dordogne =

Atur
- Part of Boulazac Isle Manoire
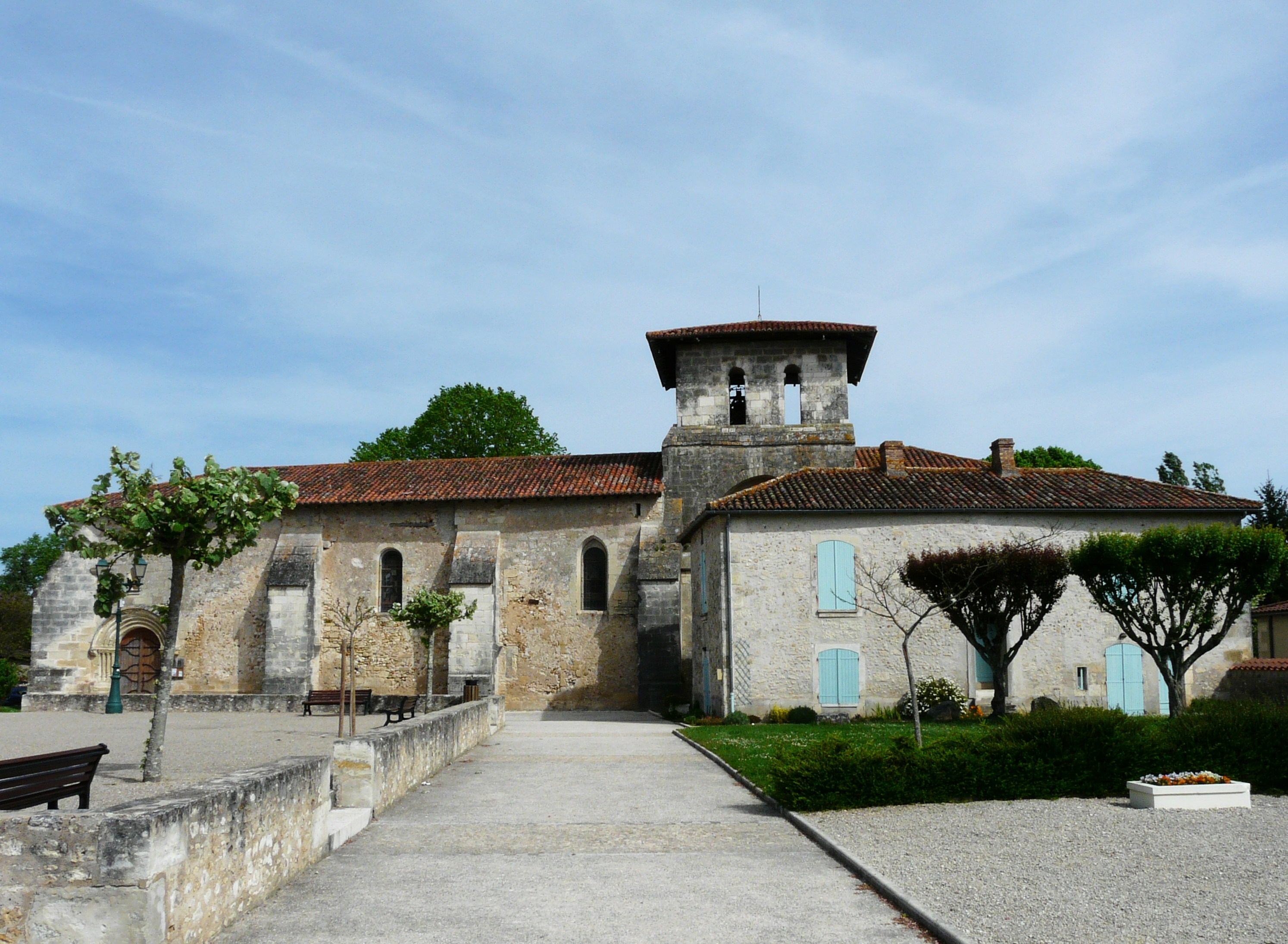
- Location of Atur
- Location within France Location within Nouvelle-Aquitaine
- Coordinates: 45°08′29″N 0°44′55″E
- Country: France
- Region: Nouvelle-Aquitaine
- Department: Dordogne
- Arrondissement: Périgueux
- Canton: Isle-Manoire
- Commune: Boulazac Isle Manoire
- Area^{1}: 19.13 km^{2} (7.39 sq mi)
- Highest elevation: 271 m (889 ft)
- Lowest elevation: 115 m (377 ft)
- Population (2022): 1,918
  - Density: 100.3/km^{2} (259.7/sq mi)
- Time zone: UTC+01:00 (CET)
  - Summer (DST): UTC+02:00 (CEST)
- Postal code: 24750
- ^{1} French Land Register data, which excludes lakes, ponds, glaciers > 1 km^{2} (0.386 sq mi or 247 acres) and river estuaries.

Atur (French pronunciation: [atyʁ]; Occitan: Astur) is a former commune in the Dordogne department in southwestern France. On 1 January 2016, it was merged into the new commune Boulazac Isle Manoire.

== Population ==
Historical population

Year	Pop.	±% p.a.
1793	770	—
1800	774	+0.07%
1806	790	+0.34%
1821	777	−0.11%
1831	832	+0.69%
1836	772	−1.49%
1841	750	−0.58%
1846	812	+1.60%
1851	840	+0.68%
1856	791	−1.19%
1861	807	+0.40%
1866	802	−0.12%
1872	774	−0.59%
1876	777	+0.10%
1881	820	+1.08%
1886	767	−1.33%
1891	740	−0.71%

Year	Pop.	±% p.a.
1896	734	−0.16%
1901	710	−0.66%
1906	701	−0.25%
1911	684	−0.49%
1921	570	−1.81%
1926	571	+0.04%
1931	546	−0.89%
1936	555	+0.33%
1946	567	+0.21%
1954	516	−1.17%
1962	517	+0.02%
1968	560	+1.34%
1975	836	+5.89%
1982	1,082	+3.75%
1990	1,248	+1.80%
1999	1,490	+1.99%
2022	1,918	+1.10%

Source: EHESS and INSEE

== See also ==
- Communes of the Dordogne department
