= Saint-Pierre-de-Chignac =

- Commune
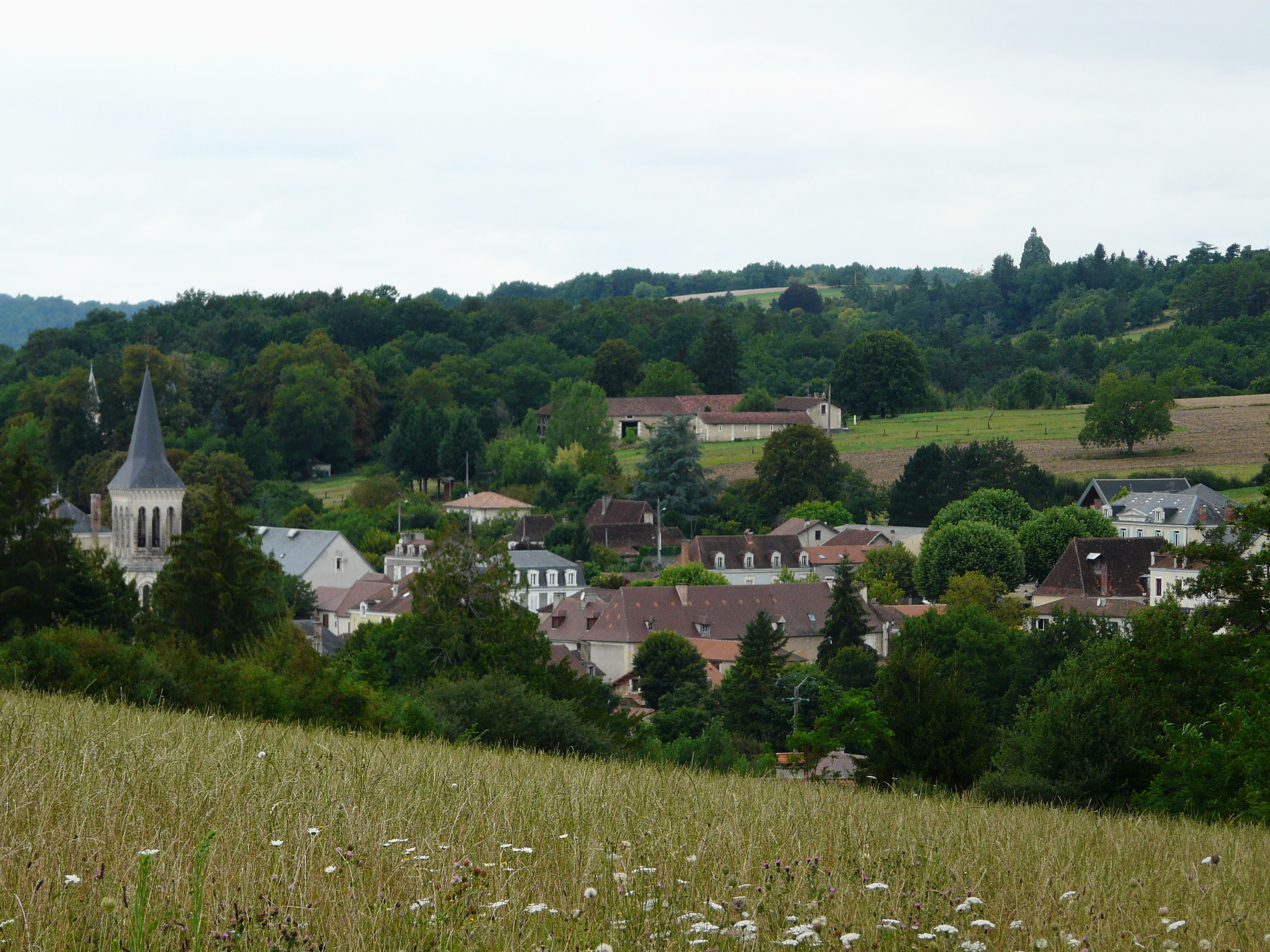
- A general view of Saint-Pierre-de-Chignac

- Coat of arms
- Location of Saint-Pierre-de-Chignac
- Location within France Location within Nouvelle-Aquitaine
- Coordinates: 45°07′30″N 0°51′27″E
- Country: France
- Region: Nouvelle-Aquitaine
- Department: Dordogne
- Arrondissement: Périgueux
- Canton: Isle-Manoire
- Intercommunality: Le Grand Périgueux

Government
  - Mayor (2020–2026): Daniel Reynet
- Area^{1}: 15.70 km^{2} (6.06 sq mi)
- Elevation: 134 m (440 ft)
- Highest elevation: 252 m (827 ft)
- Lowest elevation: 126 m (413 ft)
- Population (2023): 971
  - Density: 61.8/km^{2} (160/sq mi)
- Time zone: UTC+01:00 (CET)
  - Summer (DST): UTC+02:00 (CEST)
- INSEE/Postal code: 24484 /24330
- ^{1} French Land Register data, which excludes lakes, ponds, glaciers > 1 km^{2} (0.386 sq mi or 247 acres) and river estuaries.

Saint-Pierre-de-Chignac (French pronunciation: [sɛ̃ pjɛʁ də ʃiɲak]; Limousin: Sent Peir de Chinhac) is a commune in the Dordogne department in Nouvelle-Aquitaine in southwestern France. Saint-Pierre-de-Chignac station has rail connections to Bordeaux, Périgueux and Brive-la-Gaillarde.

== Population ==
Historical population
| Year | Pop. | ±% p.a. |
|---|---|---|
| 1968 | 675 | — |
| 1975 | 654 | −0.45% |
| 1982 | 718 | +1.34% |
| 1990 | 771 | +0.89% |
| 1999 | 777 | +0.09% |
| 2007 | 776 | −0.02% |
| 2012 | 839 | +1.57% |
| 2017 | 871 | +0.75% |
| 2023 | 971 | +1.83% |
Source: INSEE

== See also ==
- Communes of the Dordogne department
