= La Douze =

- Commune
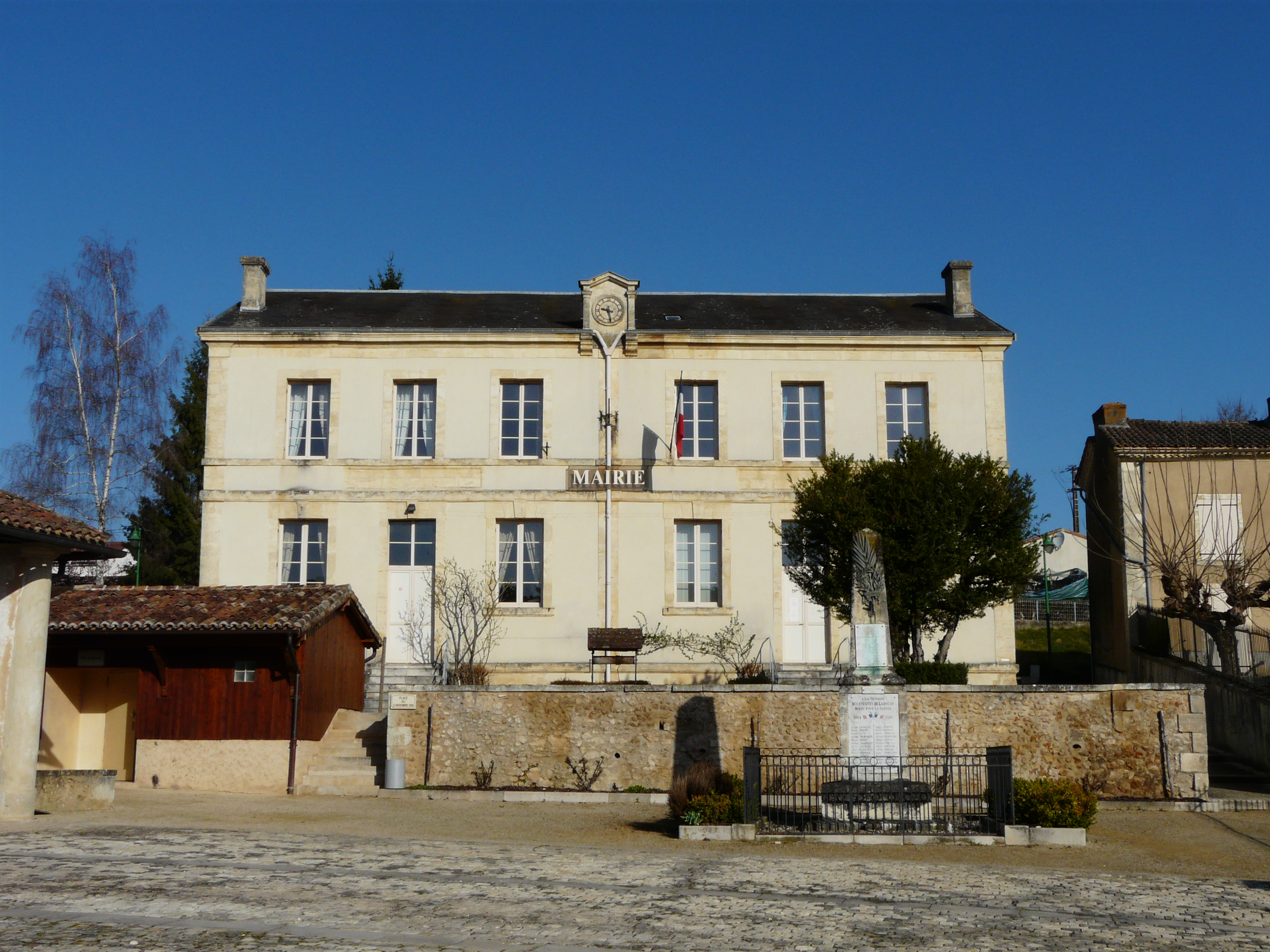
- The town hall in La Douze

- Coat of arms
- Location of La Douze
- Location within France Location within Nouvelle-Aquitaine
- Coordinates: 45°03′45″N 0°51′52″E
- Country: France
- Region: Nouvelle-Aquitaine
- Department: Dordogne
- Arrondissement: Périgueux
- Canton: Isle-Manoire
- Intercommunality: Le Grand Périgueux

Government
  - Mayor (2020–2026): Vincent Lacoste
- Area^{1}: 23.05 km^{2} (8.90 sq mi)
- Elevation: 200 m (660 ft)
- Highest elevation: 267 m (876 ft)
- Lowest elevation: 132 m (433 ft)
- Population (2023): 1,151
  - Density: 49.93/km^{2} (129.3/sq mi)
- Time zone: UTC+01:00 (CET)
  - Summer (DST): UTC+02:00 (CEST)
- INSEE/Postal code: 24156 /24330
- ^{1} French Land Register data, which excludes lakes, ponds, glaciers > 1 km^{2} (0.386 sq mi or 247 acres) and river estuaries.

La Douze (French pronunciation: [la duz]; Occitan: La Dosa) is a commune in the Dordogne department in Nouvelle-Aquitaine in southwestern France. Les Versannes station has rail connections to Périgueux and Agen.

== Population ==
Historical population
Year	Pop.	±% p.a.
1968	693	—
1975	700	+0.14%
1982	801	+1.94%
1990	866	+0.98%
1999	902	+0.45%
2007	1,024	+1.60%
2012	1,105	+1.53%
2017	1,150	+0.80%
2023	1,151	+0.01%
Source: INSEE

== History ==
The lordship of La Douze was acquired in 1372 by the Abzac family. It was converted to a marquisate in 1615, which lasted until 1943.

On Cassini's map of France between 1756 and 1789, the village is identified by the name Ladouze.

== See also ==
- Communes of the Dordogne department
