= Lahamaide =

Village in Wallonia, Belgium

- Village
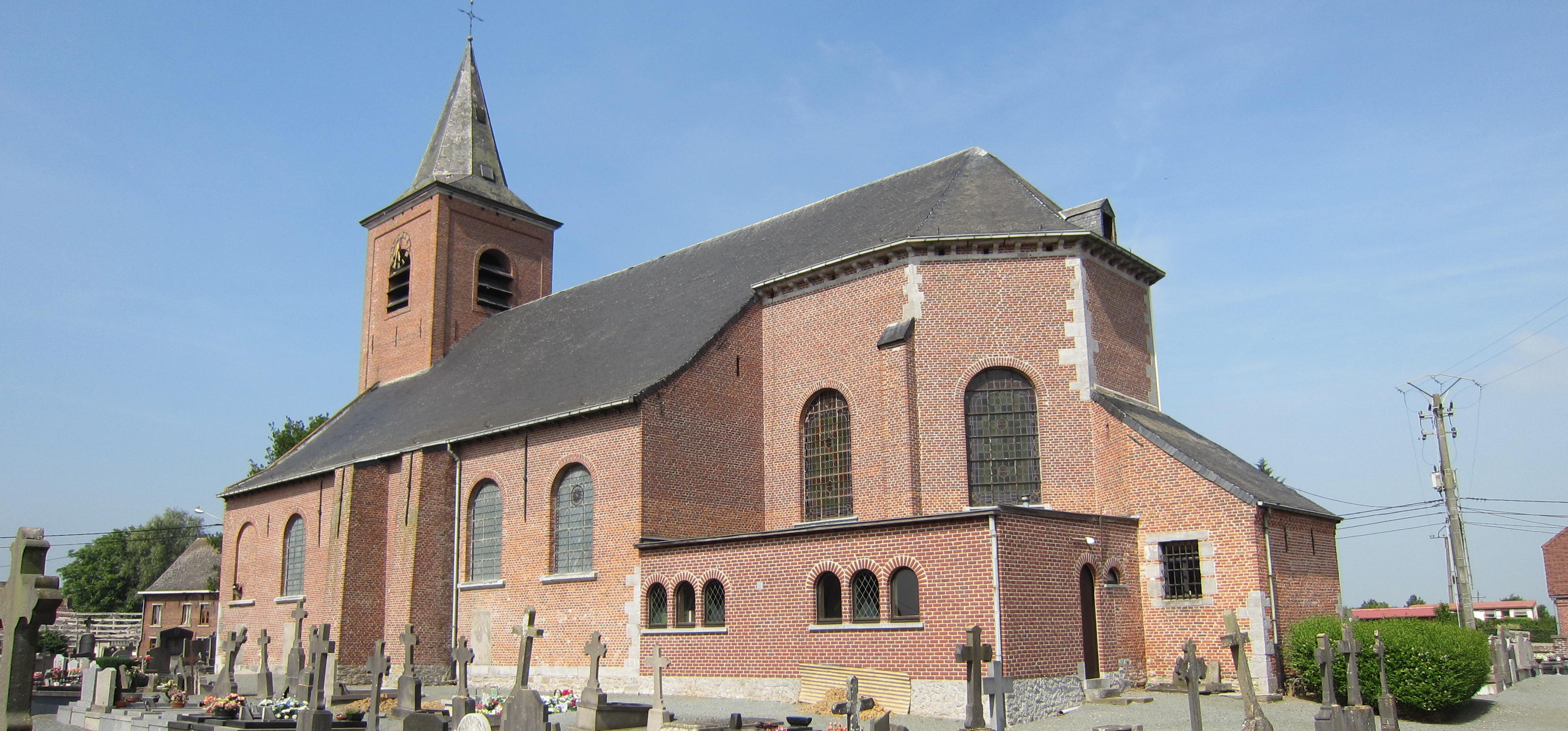
- The church in Lahamaide.

- Coat of arms

- Location within Belgium Location within Europe
- Coordinates: 50°41′N 3°43′E
- Country: Belgium
- Community: French
- Region: Wallonia
- Province: Hainaut
- Arrondissement: Ath
- Municipality: Ellezelles
- Time zone: UTC+1 (CET)
  - Summer (DST): UTC+2 (CEST)
- Postal code: 7890
- Area code: 068

Lahamaide, also known as La Hamaide, is a village in Wallonia, Belgium, located in the municipality of Ellezelles, Hainaut Province. It was the place of birth of Lamoral, Count of Egmont, who was born at the Château de Lahamaide in 1522.
