= Ellezelles =

Municipality in Hainaut Province, Wallonia, Belgium

Ellezelles Elzîle (Picard): Elzele (Dutch)
- Municipality
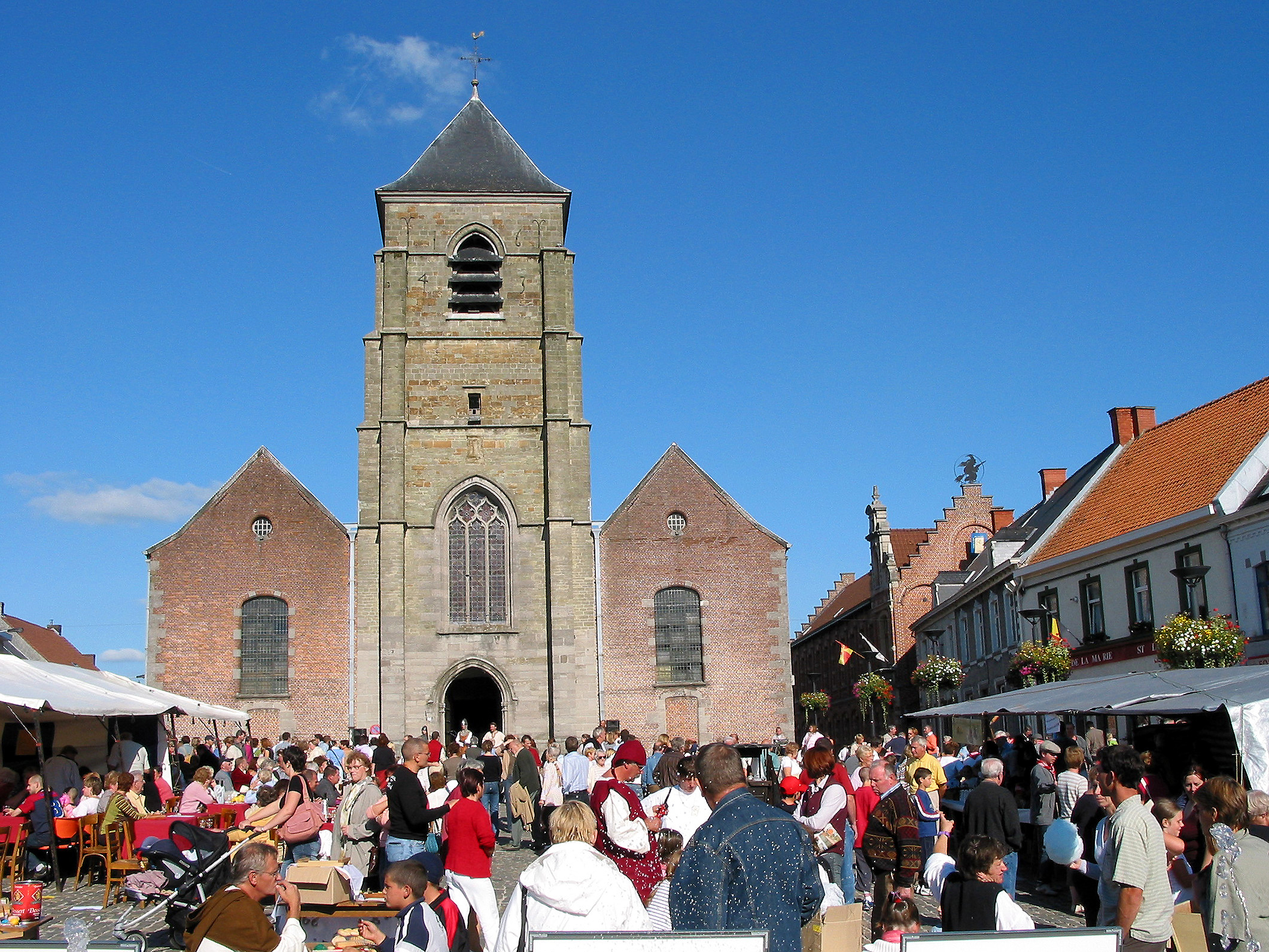

- Flag Coat of arms

- The municipality in Ath arrondissement in the province of Hainaut
- Interactive map of Ellezelles
- Location in Belgium
- Coordinates: 50°44′N 03°41′E
- Country: Belgium
- Community: French Community
- Region: Wallonia
- Province: Hainaut
- Arrondissement: Ath

Government
  - Mayor: Idesbalde Cauchie (cdH) (LB)
  - Governing party: Liste du Bourgmestre (LB) - Ecolo

Area
  - Total: 45.11 km^{2} (17.42 sq mi)

Population (2018-01-01)
  - Total: 6,001
  - Density: 133.0/km^{2} (344.5/sq mi)
- Postal codes: 7890
- NIS code: 51017
- Area codes: 068
- Website: www.ellezelles.be

Ellezelles (French pronunciation: [ɛlzɛl]; Dutch: Elzele; Picard: Elzîle; Walloon: Elziele) is a municipality of Wallonia located in the province of Hainaut, Belgium.

It consists of the following districts: Ellezelles, Lahamaide, and Wodecq. Bordering Flanders, the town is home to a minority of Dutch-speakers.

The village archives contain a document "attesting" to the birth of Hercule Poirot on 1 April 1850.

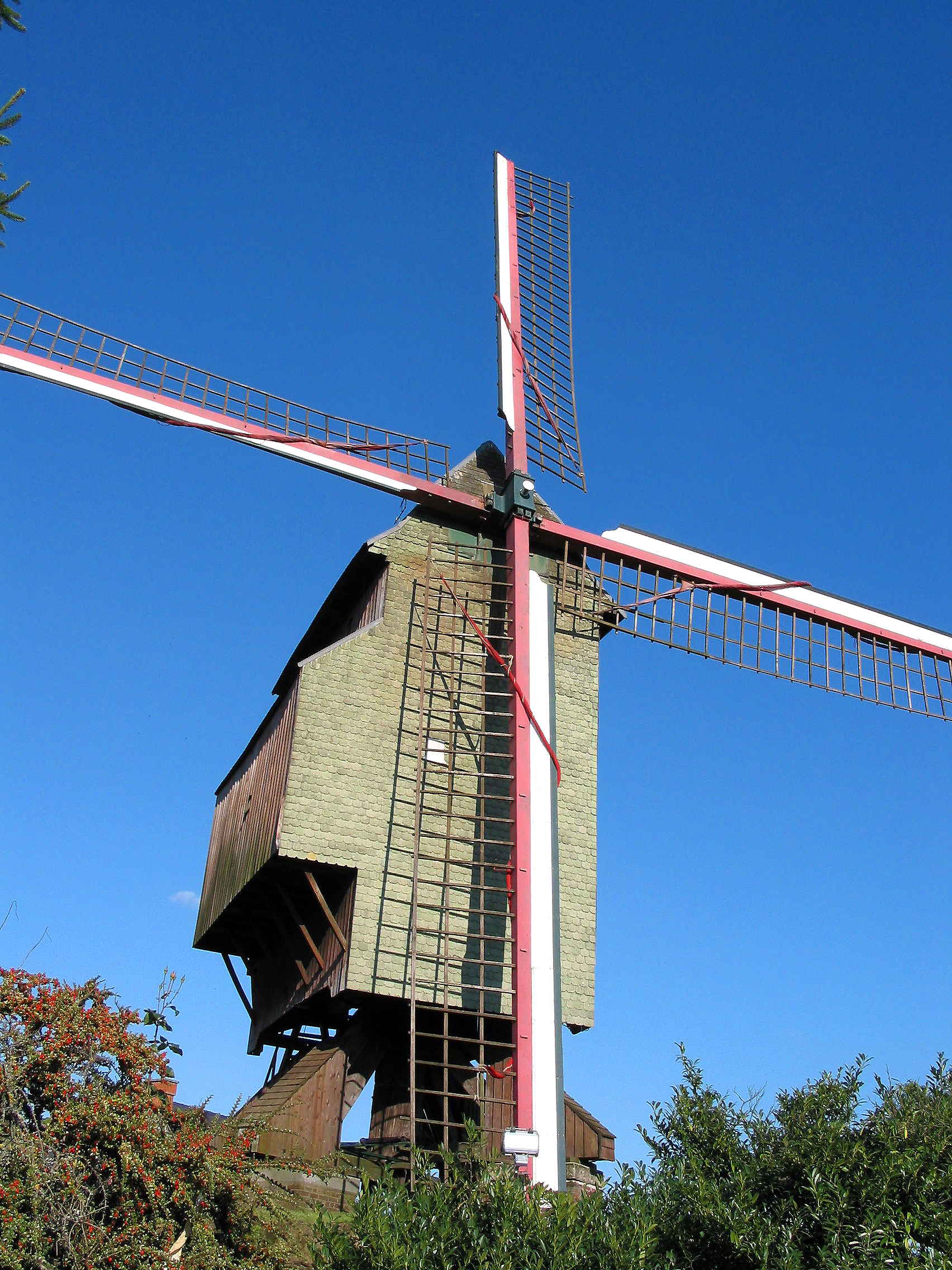
"Wild cat" windmill (1751)

== Notable people ==
- Lamoral, Count of Egmont, Prince of Gavere (1522 in La Hamaide near Ellezelles – executed in 1568) a general and statesman in the Spanish Netherlands just before the start of the Eighty Years' War.
- Richard Ely (born 1974 in Ellezelles) a Belgian writer, journalist and ethnobotanist.
