= Canton of Isle-Manoire =

Coordinates: 45.18°N 0.77°E

The canton of Isle-Manoire is an administrative division of the Dordogne department, southwestern France. It was created at the French canton reorganisation which came into effect in March 2015. Its seat is in Boulazac Isle Manoire.

It consists of the following communes:

1. Bassillac et Auberoche (partly)
2. Boulazac Isle Manoire
3. La Douze
4. Sanilhac (partly)
5. Saint-Crépin-d'Auberoche
6. Saint-Geyrac
7. Saint-Pierre-de-Chignac
