= Lalinde (disambiguation) =

Lalinde is a French commune.

Lalinde may also refer to:

- Canal de Lalinde, France
- Canton of Lalinde, France
- Lalinde station, a railway station in the commune
- Julián Lalinde (born 1985), Uruguayan retired footballer
