= Château de Falgueyrac =

Château in Dordogne, Aquitaine, France

Coordinates: 44°51′40″N 0°54′10″E

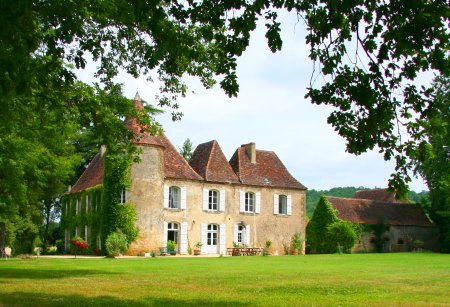

The Château de Falgueyrac is a château located in the commune of Saint-Chamassy in Dordogne, Aquitaine, France, in the Perigord Noir, seven kilometers from Le Bugue, and two kilometers from Le Buisson-de-Cadouin.

It was constructed in the 17th century, and modified and enlarged in the 19th century.
