= Couze station =

Railway station in Nouvelle-Aquitaine, France

Coordinates: 44°50′11″N 0°42′13″E

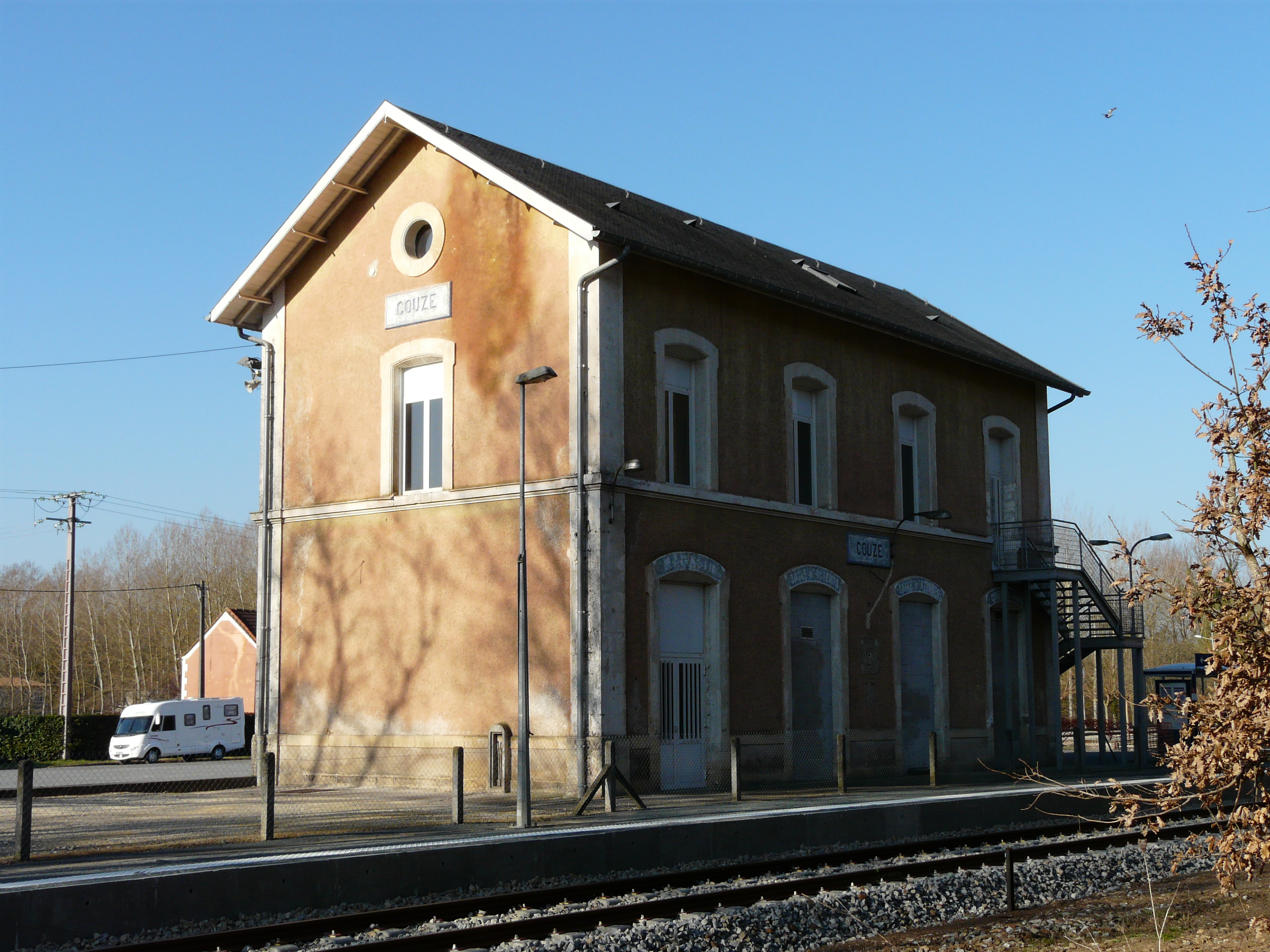
Couze station

Couze is a railway station in Lalinde, Nouvelle-Aquitaine, France. The station is located on the Libourne - Le Buisson railway line. The station is served by TER (local) services operated by SNCF.

== Train services ==
The following services currently call at Couze:

- local service (TER Nouvelle-Aquitaine) Bordeaux - Libourne - Bergerac - Sarlat-la-Canéda

Preceding station	TER Nouvelle-Aquitaine	Following station
Bergerac towards Bordeaux	33	Lalinde towards Sarlat-la-Canéda
