= Mauzac station =

Railway station in Mauzac-et-Grand-Castang, France

Coordinates: 44°51′19″N 0°47′24″E

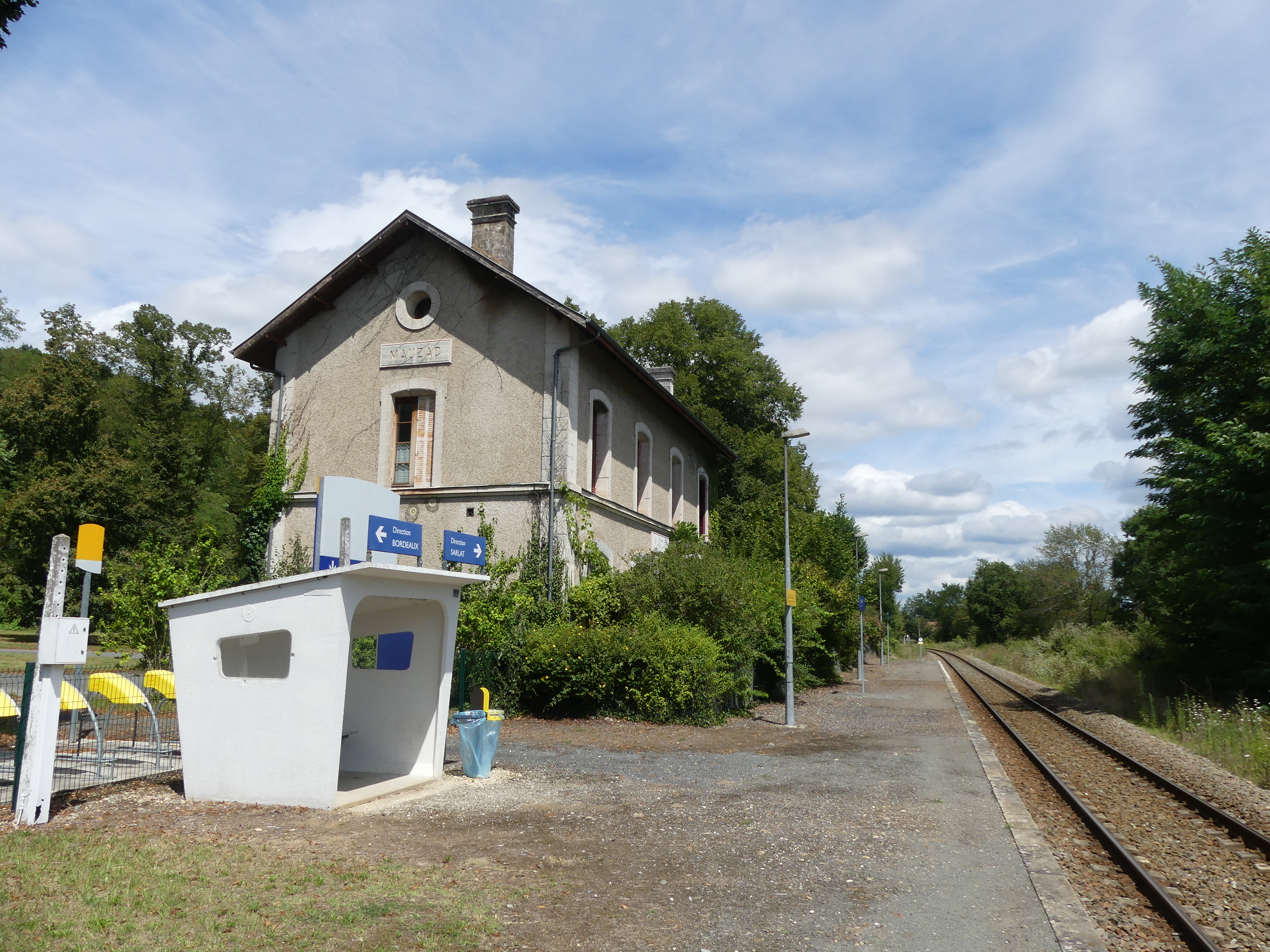
Mauzac station

Mauzac is a railway station in Mauzac-et-Grand-Castang, Nouvelle-Aquitaine, France. The station is located on the Libourne - Le Buisson railway line. The station is served by TER (local) services operated by SNCF.

== Train services ==
The following services currently call at Mauzac:

- local service (TER Nouvelle-Aquitaine) Bordeaux - Libourne - Bergerac - Sarlat-la-Canéda

Preceding station	TER Nouvelle-Aquitaine	Following station
Lalinde towards Bordeaux	33	Trémolat towards Sarlat-la-Canéda
