= Le Bugue station =

Railway station in Le Bugue, France

Coordinates: 44°54′20″N 0°56′37″E

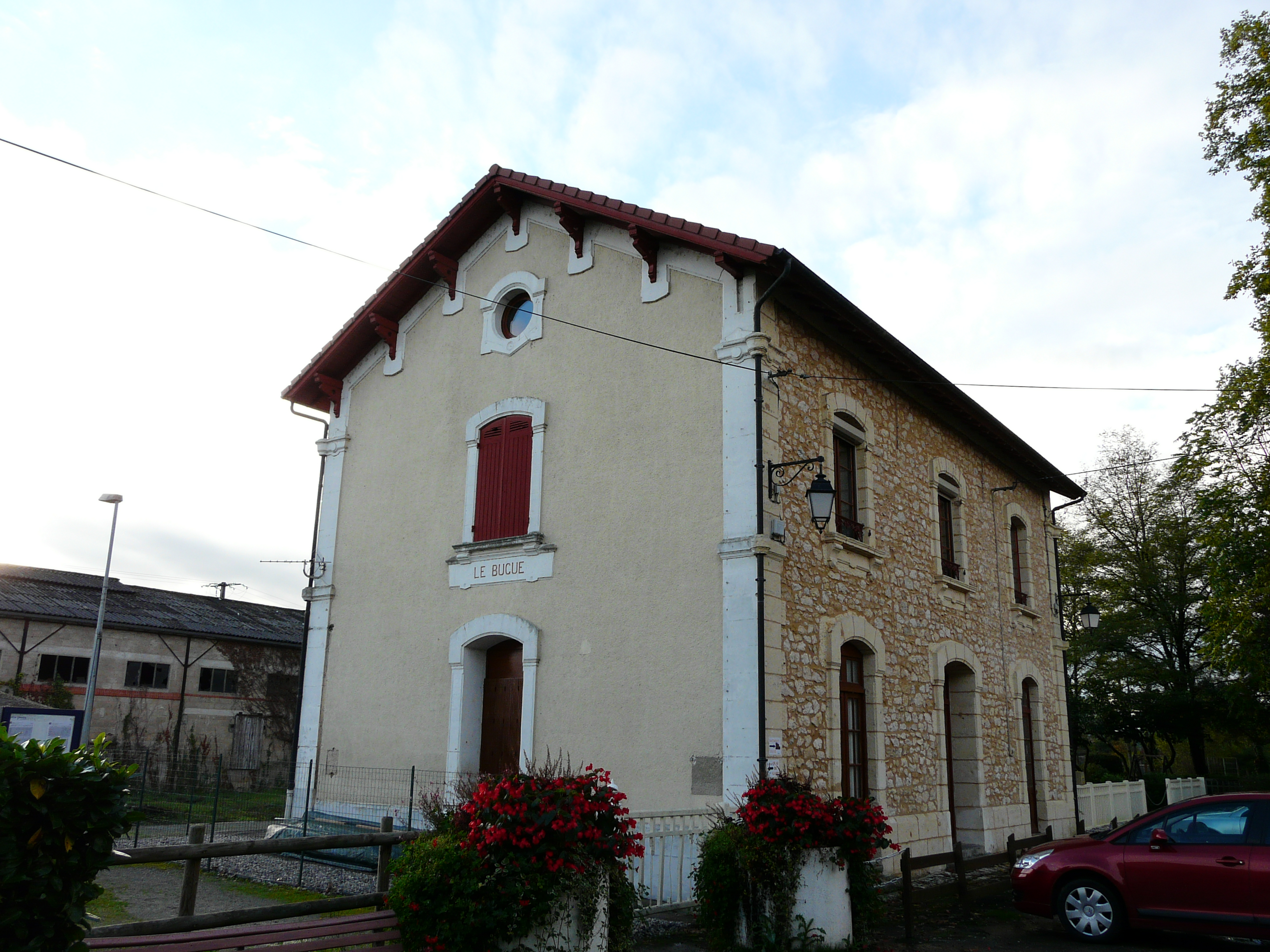
The station in 2013.

Le Bugue is a railway station in Le Bugue, Nouvelle-Aquitaine, France. The station is located on the Niversac - Agen railway line. The station is served by TER (local) services operated by SNCF.

== Train services ==
The following services currently call at Le Bugue:

- local service (TER Nouvelle-Aquitaine) Périgueux - Le Buisson - Monsempron-Libos - Agen

Preceding station	TER Nouvelle-Aquitaine	Following station
Les Eyzies towards Périgueux	34	Le Buisson towards Agen or Sarlat-la-Canéda
