= Bergerac station =

Railway station in Bergerac, France

Coordinates: 44°51′27″N 0°29′18″E

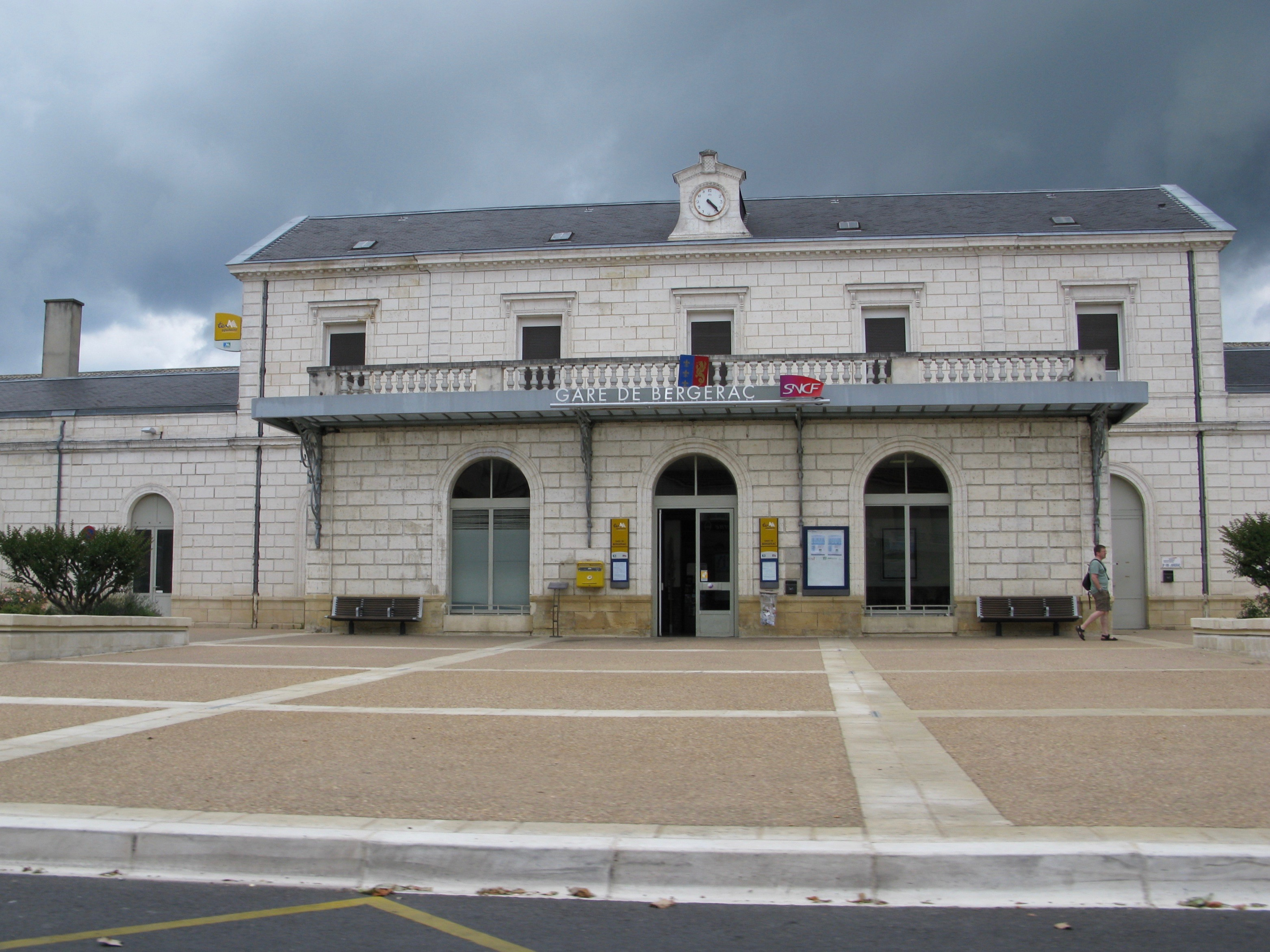
Bergerac railway station

Bergerac is a railway station in Bergerac, Nouvelle-Aquitaine, France. The station is located on the Libourne - Le Buisson railway line. The station is served by TER (local) services operated by SNCF. The station is 39m above sea level. It is at kilometre point 607.481 on the line from Libourne to Buisson. Formerly there was also a junction with the line to Magnac-sur-Touvre.

== History ==
The station opened on 20 December 1875, built by the Compagnie du chemin de fer de Paris à Orléans.

== Train services ==
The following services currently call at Bergerac:

- local service (TER Nouvelle-Aquitaine) Bordeaux - Libourne - Bergerac - Sarlat-la-Canéda

Preceding station	TER Nouvelle-Aquitaine	Following station
Lamonzie-Saint-Martin towards Bordeaux	33	Couze towards Sarlat-la-Canéda
