= Le Buisson station =

Railway station in Le Buisson-de-Cadouin, France

Coordinates: 44°50′49″N 0°54′30″E

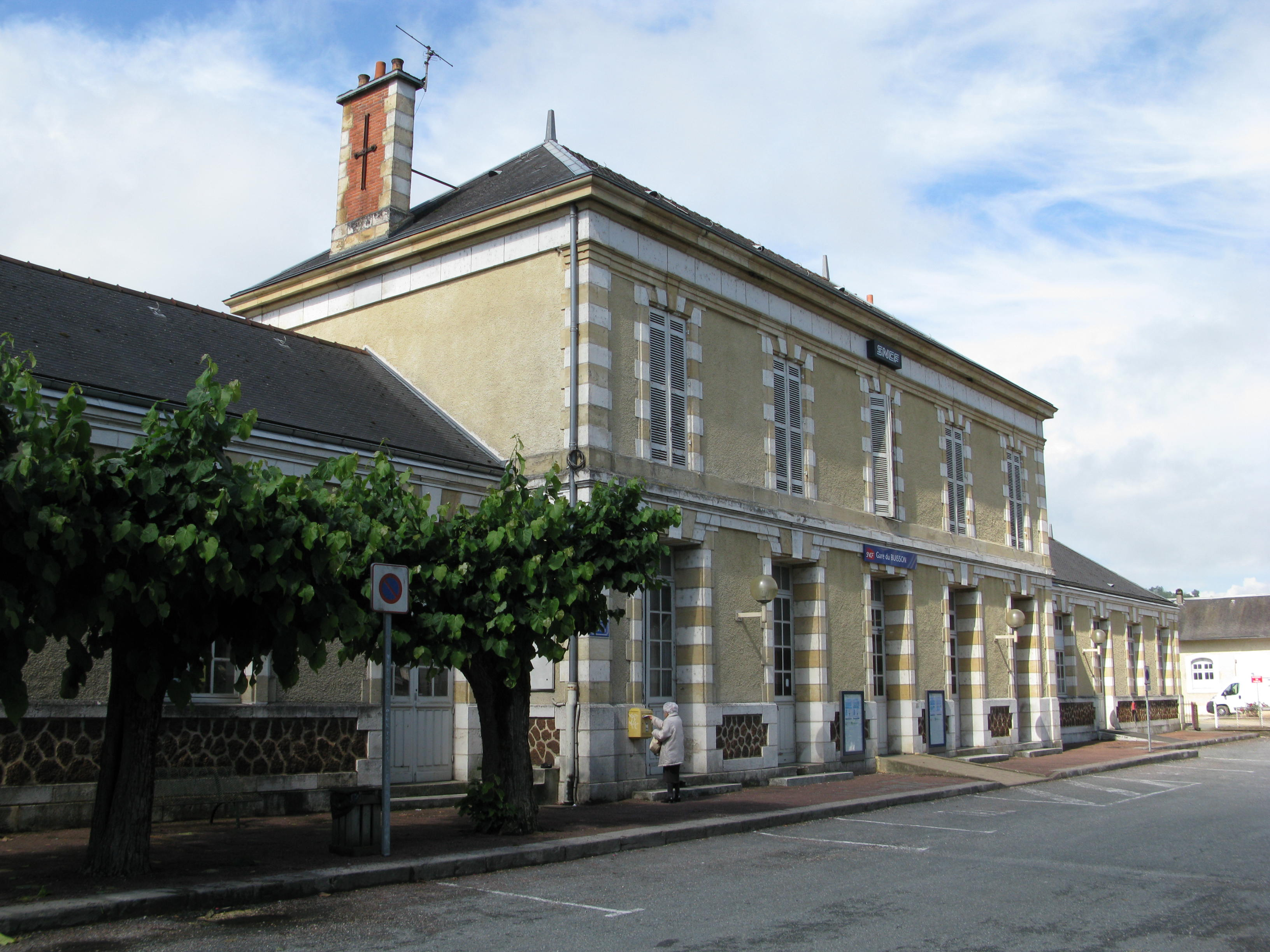
Le Buisson station

Le Buisson is a railway station in Le Buisson-de-Cadouin, Nouvelle-Aquitaine, France. The station is located on the Libourne - Le Buisson and Niversac - Agen railway lines. The station is served by TER (local) services operated by SNCF.

== Train services ==
The following services currently call at Le Buisson:

- local service (TER Nouvelle-Aquitaine) Bordeaux - Libourne - Bergerac - Sarlat-la-Canéda
- local service (TER Nouvelle-Aquitaine) Périgueux - Le Buisson - Monsempron-Libos - Agen
- local service (TER Nouvelle-Aquitaine) Périgueux - Le Buisson - Sarlat-la-Canéda

Preceding station	TER Nouvelle-Aquitaine	Following station
Trémolat towards Bordeaux	33	Siorac-en-Périgord towards Sarlat-la-Canéda
Le Bugue towards Périgueux	34	Siorac-en-Périgord towards Agen or Sarlat-la-Canéda
