= Siorac-en-Périgord station =

Railway station in Siorac-en-Perigold, France

Coordinates: 44°49′10″N 0°59′03″E

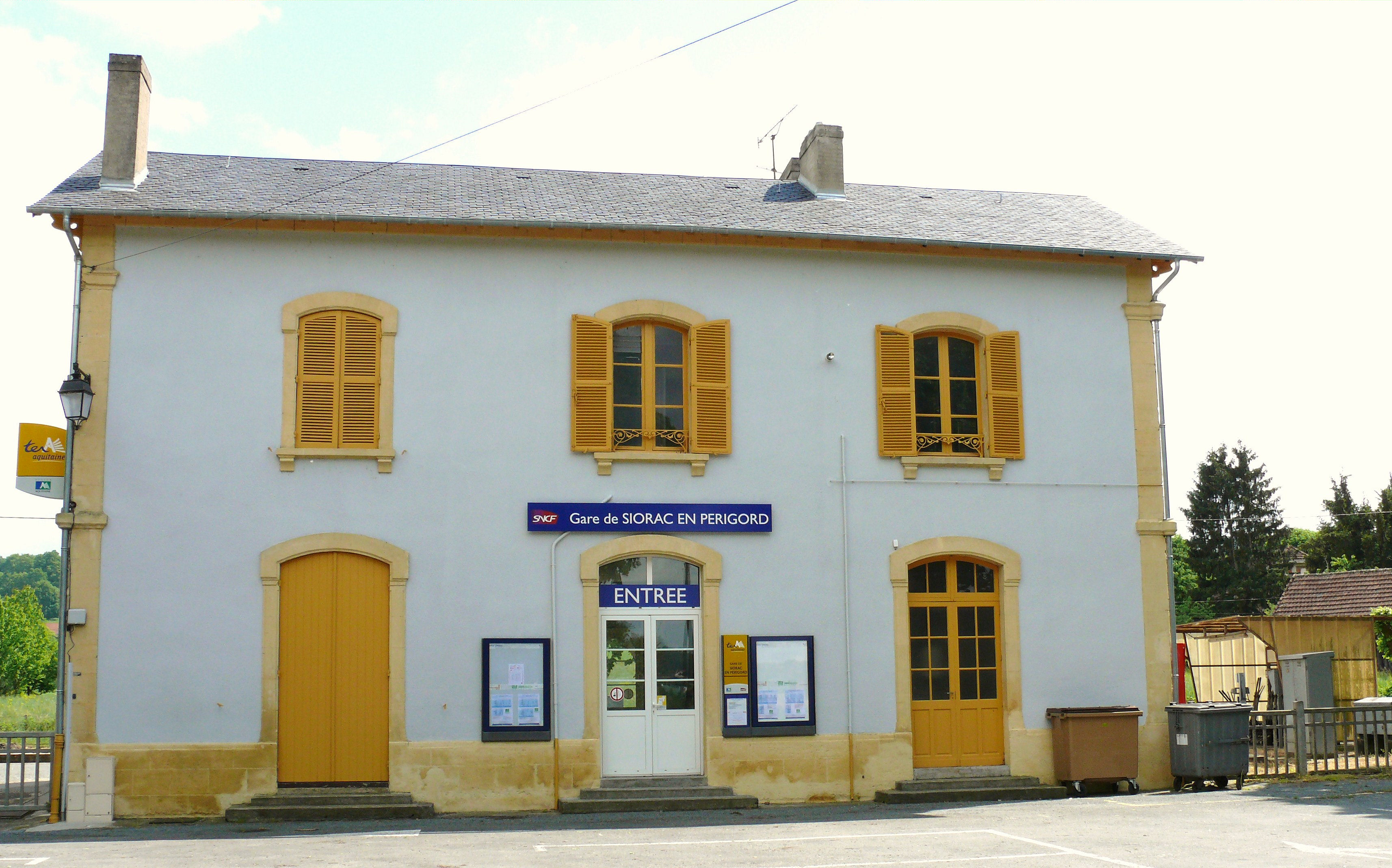
Siorac-en-Périgord station

Siorac-en-Périgord is a railway station in Siorac-en-Périgord, Nouvelle-Aquitaine, France. The station is located on the Niversac - Agen and Siorac-en-Périgord - Cazoulès railway lines. The station is served by TER (local) services operated by SNCF.

== Train services ==
The following services currently call at Siorac-en-Périgord:

- local service (TER Nouvelle-Aquitaine) Bordeaux - Libourne - Bergerac - Sarlat-la-Canéda
- local service (TER Nouvelle-Aquitaine) Périgueux - Le Buisson - Monsempron-Libos - Agen
- local service (TER Nouvelle-Aquitaine) Périgueux - Le Buisson - Sarlat-la-Canéda

Preceding station	TER Nouvelle-Aquitaine	Following station
Le Buisson towards Bordeaux	33	Saint-Cyprien towards Sarlat-la-Canéda
Le Buisson towards Périgueux	34	Saint-Cyprien towards Sarlat-la-Canéda
Le Buisson towards Périgueux	34	Belvès towards Agen
