= Trémolat station =

Railway station in Trémolat, France

Coordinates: 44°51′44″N 0°49′51″E

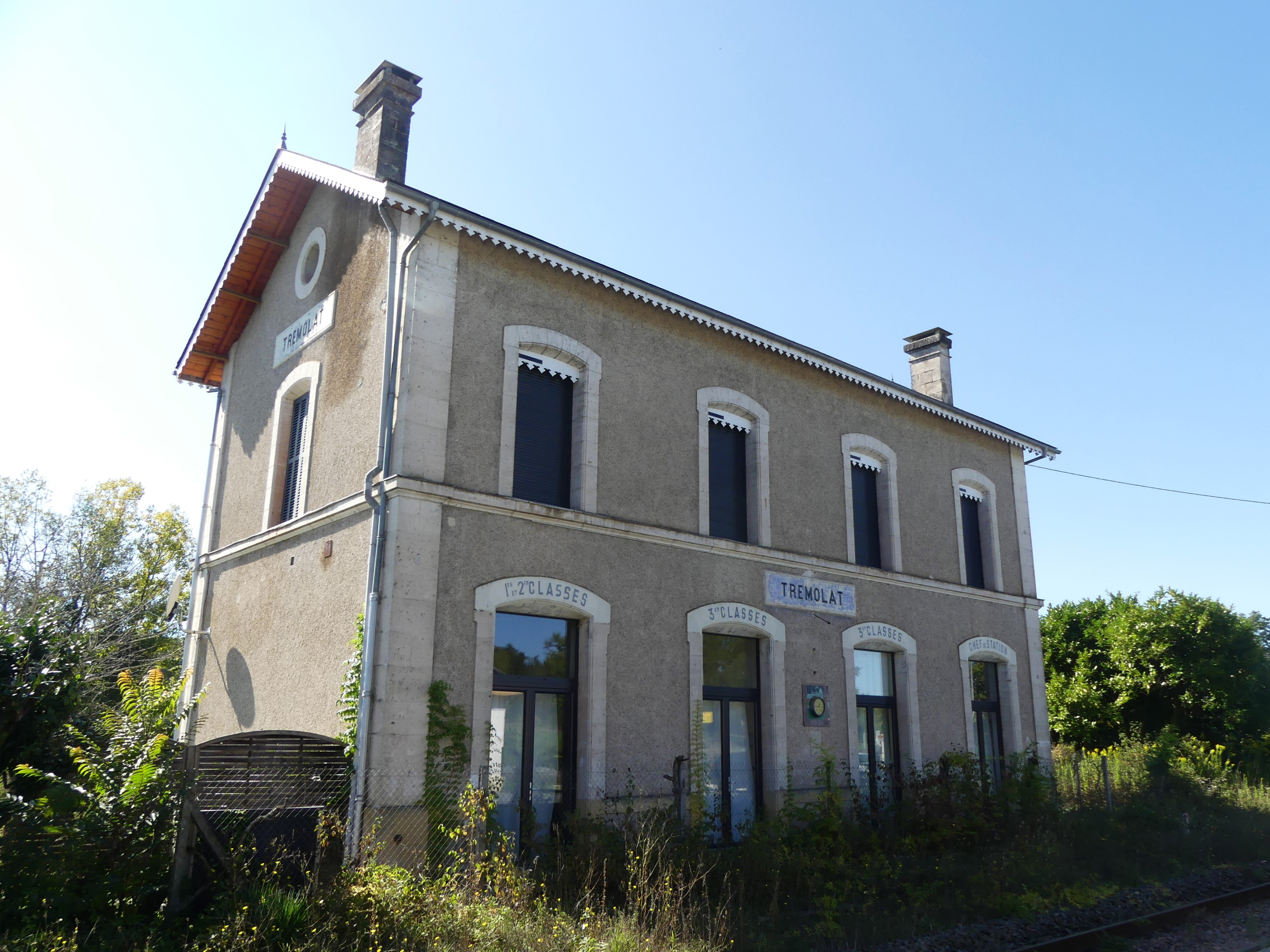
The former passenger building of Trémolat station, Dordogne, France.

Trémolat is a railway station in Trémolat, Nouvelle-Aquitaine, France. The station is located on the Libourne - Le Buisson railway line. The station is served by TER (local) services operated by SNCF.

== Train services ==
The following services currently call at Trémolat:

- local service (TER Nouvelle-Aquitaine) Bordeaux - Libourne - Bergerac - Sarlat-la-Canéda

Preceding station	TER Nouvelle-Aquitaine	Following station
Mauzac towards Bordeaux	33	Le Buisson towards Sarlat-la-Canéda
