= Chemical revolution =

Reformulation of chemistry in the 17th and 18th centuries

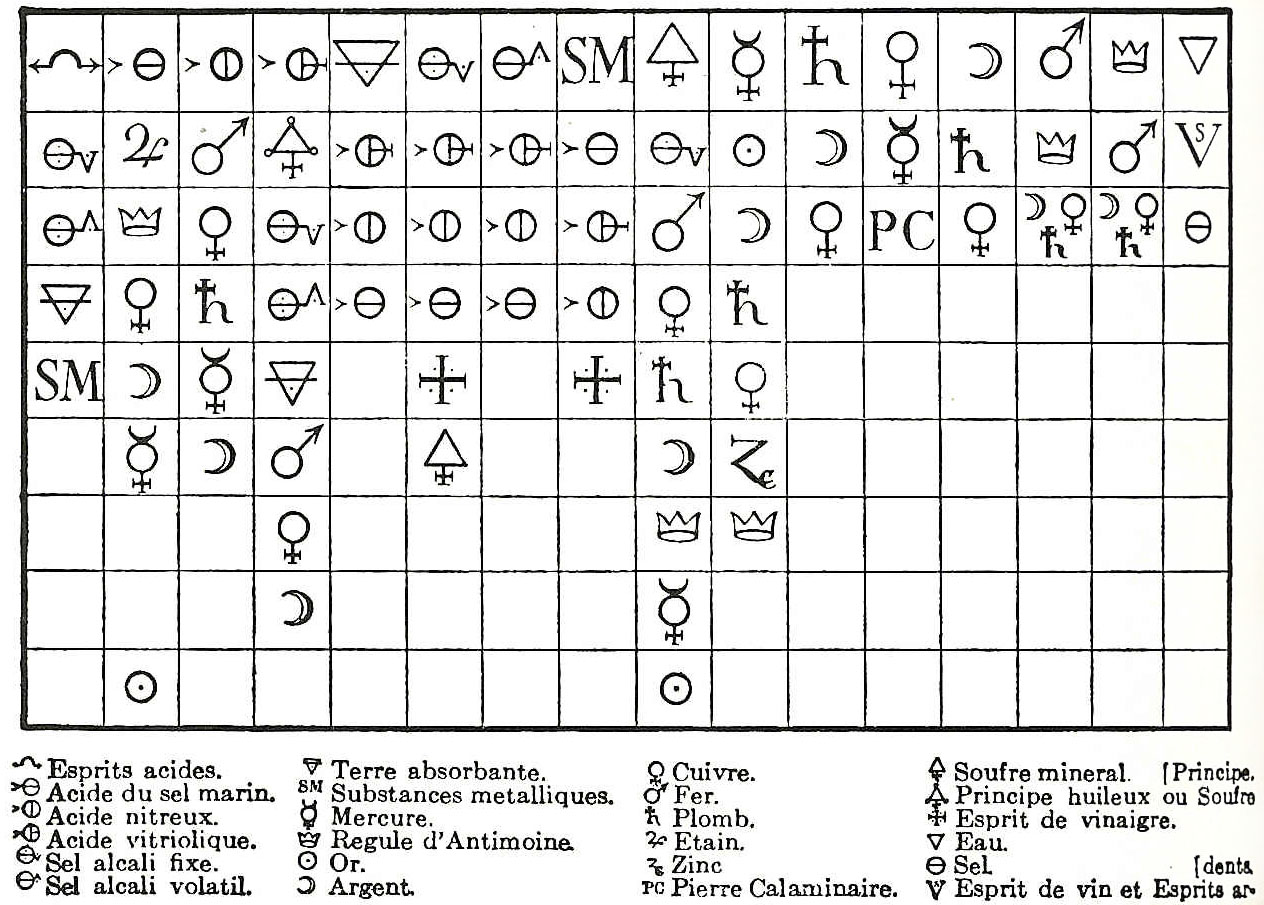
Geoffroy's 1718 affinity table: at the head of each column is a chemical species with which all the species below can combine. Some historians have defined this table as being the start of the chemical revolution.

In the history of chemistry, the chemical revolution, also called the first chemical revolution, was the reformulation of chemistry during the seventeenth and eighteenth centuries, which culminated in the law of conservation of mass and the oxygen theory of combustion.

During the 19th and 20th century, this transformation was credited to the work of the French chemist Antoine Lavoisier (the "father of modern chemistry"). However, recent work on the history of early modern chemistry considers the chemical revolution to consist of gradual changes in chemical theory and practice that emerged over a period of two centuries. The so-called Scientific Revolution took place during the sixteenth and seventeenth centuries whereas the chemical revolution took place during the seventeenth and eighteenth centuries.

== Primary factors ==
Several factors led to the first chemical revolution. First, there were the forms of gravimetric analysis that emerged from alchemy and new kinds of instruments that were developed in medical and industrial contexts. In these settings, chemists increasingly challenged hypotheses that had already been presented by the ancient Greeks. For example, chemists began to assert that all structures were composed of more than the four elements of the Greeks or the eight elements of the medieval alchemists. The Irish alchemist, Robert Boyle, laid the foundations for the Chemical Revolution, with his mechanical corpuscular philosophy, which in turn relied heavily on the alchemical corpuscular theory and experimental method dating back to pseudo-Geber.

Earlier works by chemists such as Jan Baptist van Helmont helped to shift the belief in theory that air existed as a single element to that of one in which air existed as a composition of a mixture of distinct kinds of gases. Van Helmont's data analysis also suggests that he had a general understanding of the law of conservation of mass in the 17th century. Furthermore, work by Jean Rey in the early 17th century with metals like tin and lead and their oxidation in the presence of air and water helped pinpoint the contribution and existence of oxygen in the oxidation process.

Other factors included new experimental techniques and the discovery of 'fixed air' (carbon dioxide) by Joseph Black in the middle of the 18th century. This discovery was particularly important because it empirically proved that 'air' did not consist of only one substance and because it established 'gas' as an important experimental substance. Near to the end of the 18th century, the experiments by Henry Cavendish and Joseph Priestley further proved that air is not an element and is instead composed of several different gases. Lavoisier also translated the names of chemical substance into a new nomenclatural language more appealing to scientists of the nineteenth century. Such changes took place in an atmosphere in which the Industrial Revolution increased public interest in learning and practicing chemistry. When describing the task of reinventing chemical nomenclature, Lavoisier attempted to harness the new centrality of chemistry by making the rather hyperbolic claim that:

We must clean house thoroughly, for they have made use of an enigmatical language peculiar to themselves, which in general presents one meaning for the adepts and another meaning for the vulgar, and at the same time contains nothing that is rationally intelligible either for the one or for the other.

=== Precision instruments ===
Much of the reasoning behind Antoine Lavoisier being named the "father of modern chemistry" and the start of the chemical revolution lay in his ability to mathematize the field, pushing chemistry to use the experimental methods utilized in other "more exact sciences." Lavoisier changed the field of chemistry by keeping meticulous balance sheets in his research, attempting to show that through the transformation of chemical species the total amount of substance was conserved. Lavoisier used instrumentation for thermometric and barometric measurements in his experiments, and collaborated with Pierre Simon de Laplace in the invention of the calorimeter, an instrument for measuring heat changes in a reaction.

In attempting to dismantle phlogiston theory and implement his own theory of combustion, Lavoisier utilized multiple apparatuses. These included a red-hot iron gun barrel which was designed to have water run through it and decompose, and an alteration of the apparatus which implemented a pneumatic trough at one end, a thermometer, and a barometer. The precision of his measurements was a requirement in convincing opposition of his theories about water as a compound, with instrumentation designed by himself implemented in his research.

Despite having precise measurements for his work, Lavoisier faced a large amount of opposition in his research. Proponents of phlogiston theory, such as Keir and Priestley, claimed that demonstration of facts was only applicable for raw phenomena, and that interpretation of these facts did not imply accuracy in theories. They stated that Lavoisier was attempting to impose order on observed phenomena, whereas a secondary source of validity would be required to give definitive proof of the composition of water and non-existence of phlogiston.

== Antoine Lavoisier ==
The latter stages of the revolution were fuelled by the 1789 publication of Lavoisier's Traité Élémentaire de Chimie (Elements of Chemistry). Beginning with this publication and others to follow, Lavoisier synthesised the work of others and coined the term "oxygen". Antoine Lavoisier represented the chemical revolution not only in his publications, but also in the way he practiced chemistry. Lavoisier's work was characterized by his systematic determination of weights and his strong emphasis on precision and accuracy. While it has been postulated that the law of conservation of mass was discovered by Lavoisier, this claim has been refuted by scientist Marcellin Berthelot.

Earlier use of the law of conservation of mass has been suggested by Henry Guerlac, noting that scientist Jan Baptist van Helmont had implicitly applied the methodology to his work in the 16th and 17th centuries. Earlier references of the law of conservation of mass and its use were made by Jean Rey in 1630. Although the law of conservation of mass was not explicitly discovered by Lavoisier, his work with a wider array of materials than what most scientists had available at the time allowed his work to greatly expand the boundaries of the principle and its fundamentals.

Lavoisier also contributed to chemistry a method of understanding combustion and respiration and proof of the composition of water by decomposition into its constituent parts. He explained the theory of combustion, and challenged the phlogiston theory with his views on caloric. The Traité incorporates notions of a "new chemistry" and describes the experiments and reasoning that led to his conclusions. Like Newton's Principia, which was the high point of the Scientific Revolution, Lavoisier's Traité can be seen as the culmination of the Chemical Revolution.

Lavoisier's work was not immediately accepted and it took several decades for it gain momentum. This transition was aided by the work of Jöns Jakob Berzelius, who came up with a simplified shorthand to describe chemical compounds based on John Dalton's theory of atomic weights. Many people credit Lavoisier and his overthrow of phlogiston theory as the traditional chemical revolution, with Lavoisier marking the beginning of the revolution and John Dalton marking its culmination.

=== Méthode de nomenclature chimique ===
Antoine Lavoisier, in a collaborative effort with Louis Bernard Guyton de Morveau, Claude Louis Berthollet, and Antoine François de Fourcroy, published Méthode de nomenclature chimique in 1787. This work established a terminology for the "new chemistry" which Lavoisier was creating, which focused on a standardized set of terms, establishment of new elements, and experimental work. Méthode established 55 elements which were substances that could not be broken down into simpler composite parts at the time of publishing. By introducing new terminology into the field, Lavoisier encouraged other chemists to adopt his theories and practices in order to use his terms and stay current in chemistry.

=== Traité élémentaire de chimie ===
One of Lavoisier's main influences was Étienne Bonnet, abbé de Condillac. Condillac's approach to scientific research, which was the basis of Lavoisier's approach in Traité, was to demonstrate that human beings could create a mental representation of the world using gathered evidence. In Lavoisier's preface to Traité, he states

It is a maxim universally admitted in geometry, and indeed in every branch of knowledge, that, in the progress of investigation, we should proceed from known facts to what is unknown. ... In this manner, from a series of sensations, observations, and analyses, a successive train of ideas arises, so linked together, that an attentive observer may trace back to a certain point the order and connection of the whole sum of human knowledge.

Lavoisier clearly ties his ideas in with those of Condillac, seeking to reform the field of chemistry. His goal in Traité was to associate the field with direct experience and observation, rather than assumption. His work defined a new foundation for the basis of chemical ideas and set a direction for the future course of chemistry.

== Humphry Davy ==
Humphry Davy was an English chemist and a professor of chemistry at the London's Royal Institution in the early 1800s. There he performed experiments that cast doubt upon some of Lavoisier's key ideas such as the acidity of oxygen and the idea of a caloric element. Davy was able to show that acidity was not due to the presence of oxygen using muriatic acid (hydrochloric acid) as proof. He also proved that the compound oxymuriatic acid contained no oxygen and was instead an element, which he named chlorine.

Through his use of electric batteries at the Royal Institution Davy first isolated chlorine, followed by the isolation of elemental iodine in 1813. Using the batteries Davy was also able to isolate the elements sodium and potassium. From these experiments Davy concluded that the forces that join chemical elements together must be electrical in nature. Davy also opposed the idea that caloric was an immaterial fluid, arguing instead that heat was a type of motion.

== John Dalton ==
John Dalton was an English chemist who developed the idea of atomic theory of chemical elements. Dalton's atomic theory of chemical elements assumed that each element had unique atoms associated with and specific to that atom. This was in opposition to Lavoisier's definition of elements which was that elements are substances that chemists could not break down further into simpler parts. Dalton's idea also differed from the idea of corpuscular theory of matter, which believed that all atoms were the same, and had been a supported theory since the 17th century.

To help support his idea, Dalton worked on defining the relative weights of atoms in chemicals in his work New System of Chemical Philosophy, published in 1808. His text showed calculations to determine the relative atomic weights of Lavoisier's different elements based on experimental data pertaining to the relative amounts of different elements in chemical combinations. Dalton argued that elements would combine in the simplest form possible. Water was known to be a combination of hydrogen and oxygen, thus Dalton believed water to be a binary compound containing one hydrogen and one oxygen.

Dalton was able to accurately compute the relative quantity of gases in atmospheric air. He used the specific gravity of azotic (nitrogen), oxygenous, carbonic acid (carbon dioxide), and hydrogenous gases as well as aqueous vapor determined by Lavoisier and Davy to determine the proportional weights of each as a percent of a whole volume of atmospheric air. Dalton determined that atmospheric air contains 75.55% azotic gas, 23.32% oxygenous gas, 1.03% aqueous vapor, and 0.10% carbonic acid gas.

== Jöns Jacob Berzelius ==
Jöns Jacob Berzelius was a Swedish chemist who studied medicine at the University of Uppsala and was a professor of chemistry in Stockholm. He drew on the ideas of both Davy and Dalton to create an electrochemical view of how elements combined together. Berzelius classified elements into two groups, electronegative and electropositive depending which pole of a galvanic battery they were released from when decomposed. He created a scale of charge with oxygen being the most electronegative element and potassium the most electropositive. This scale signified that some elements had positive and negative charges associated with them and the position of an element on this scale and the element's charge determined how that element combined with others.

Berzelius's work on electrochemical atomic theory was published in 1818 as Essai sur la théorie des proportions chimiques et sur l'influence chimique de l'électricité. He also introduced a new chemical nomenclature into chemistry by representing elements with letters and abbreviations, such as O for oxygen and Fe for iron. Combinations of elements were represented as sequences of these symbols and the number of atoms were represented at first by superscripts and then later subscripts.
