= Les Eyzies station =

Railway station in Les Eyzies-de-Tayac-Sireuil, France

Coordinates: 44°56′28″N 1°00′28″E

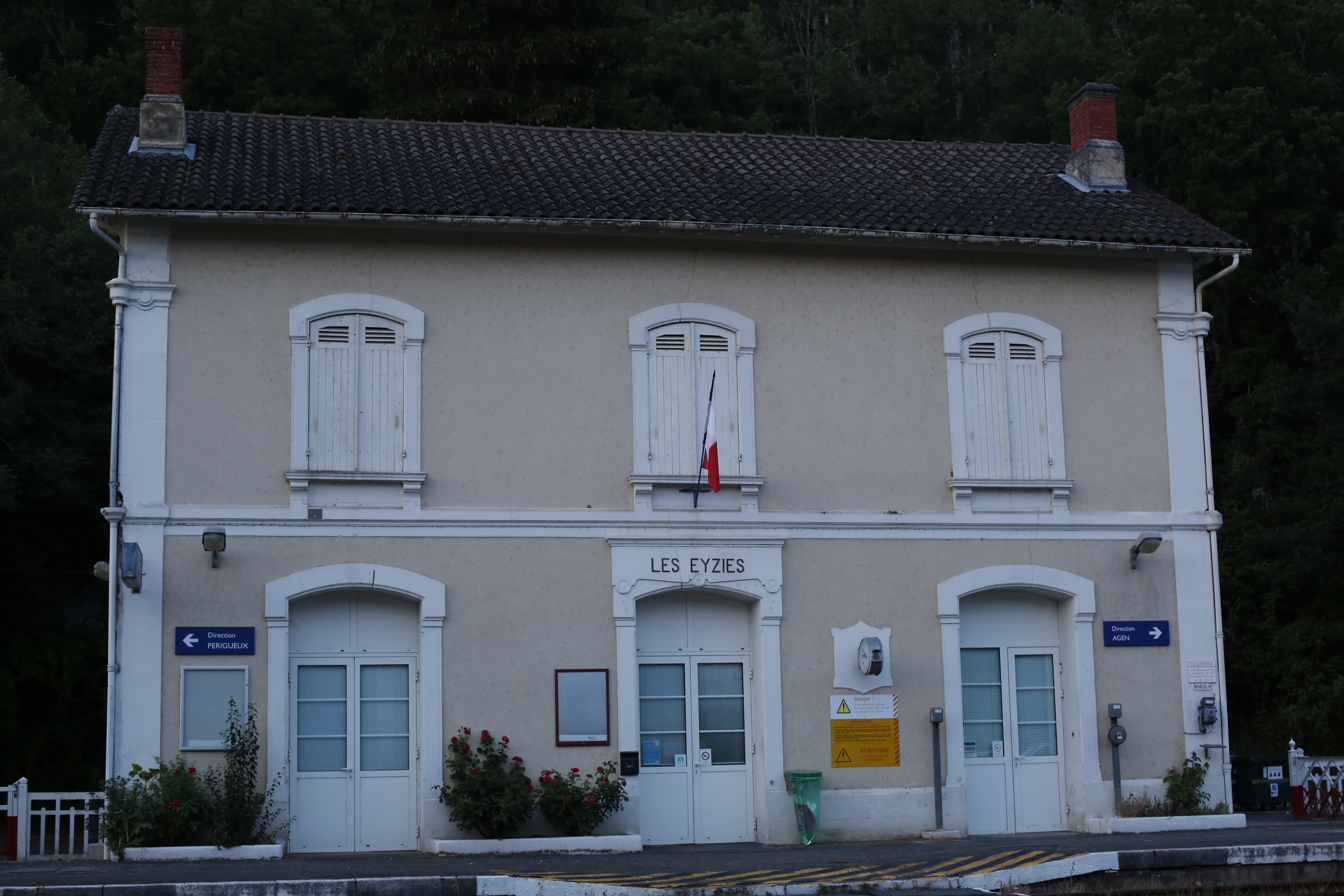
Facade of Les Eyzies station

Les Eyzies is a railway station in Les Eyzies-de-Tayac-Sireuil, Nouvelle-Aquitaine, France. The station is located on the Niversac - Agen railway line. The station is served by TER (local) services operated by SNCF.

== Train services ==
The following services currently call at Les Eyzies:

- local service (TER Nouvelle-Aquitaine) Périgueux - Le Buisson - Monsempron-Libos - Agen

Preceding station	TER Nouvelle-Aquitaine	Following station
Les Versannes towards Périgueux	34	Le Bugue towards Agen or Sarlat-la-Canéda
