= Lalinde Canal =

Canal in southwestern France

Canal de Lalinde
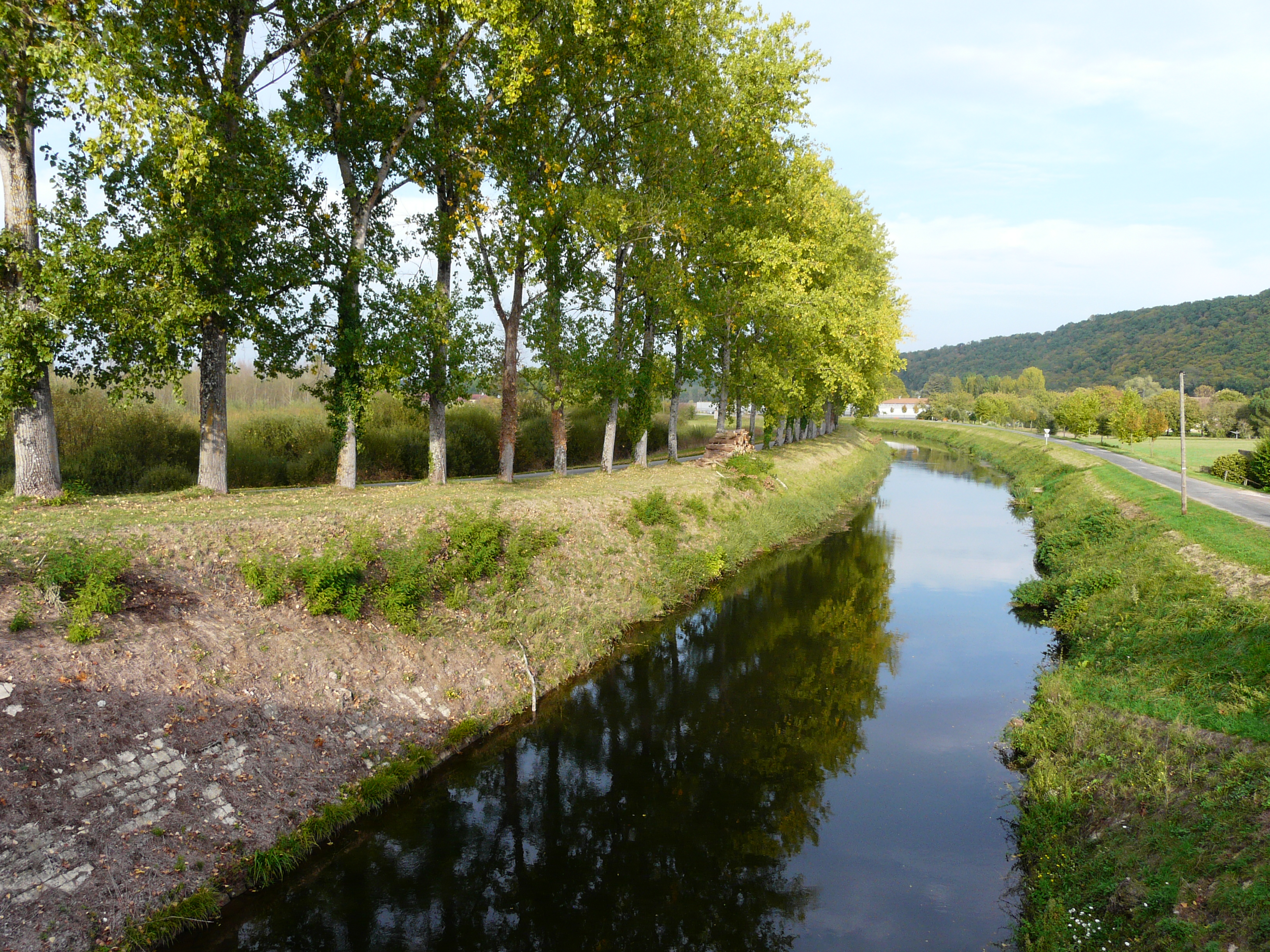
- The canal passing through Port de Badefols

Specifications
- Length: 15 km (9.3 mi)
- Locks: 9
- Status: Disused by the 1930s

History
- Principal engineer: Vauthier
- Construction began: 1838
- Date of first use: After 1840
- Date completed: 1843

Geography
- Direction: West
- Start point: Mauzac-et-Grand-Castang
- End point: Tuiliéres
- Beginning coordinates: 44.86402°N 0.79994°E
- Ending coordinates: 44.84691°N 0.62989°E

The Canal de Lalinde (French pronunciation: [kanal də lalɛ̃d]) is a canal in south western France lateral to the Dordogne River. Its purpose was to bypass the rapids of the river.

== Locks ==
The canal begins with its first lock at the village of Mauzac, just below the cingle of Tremolat. Two more locks are found where the canal passes through Lalinde and Borie-Basse. The canal rejoins the Dordogne with two sets of three locks in Tuilières.

== See also ==
- List of canals in France
