= Lalinde station =

Railway station in Lalinde, Aquitaine, France

Coordinates: 44°50′21″N 0°44′34″E

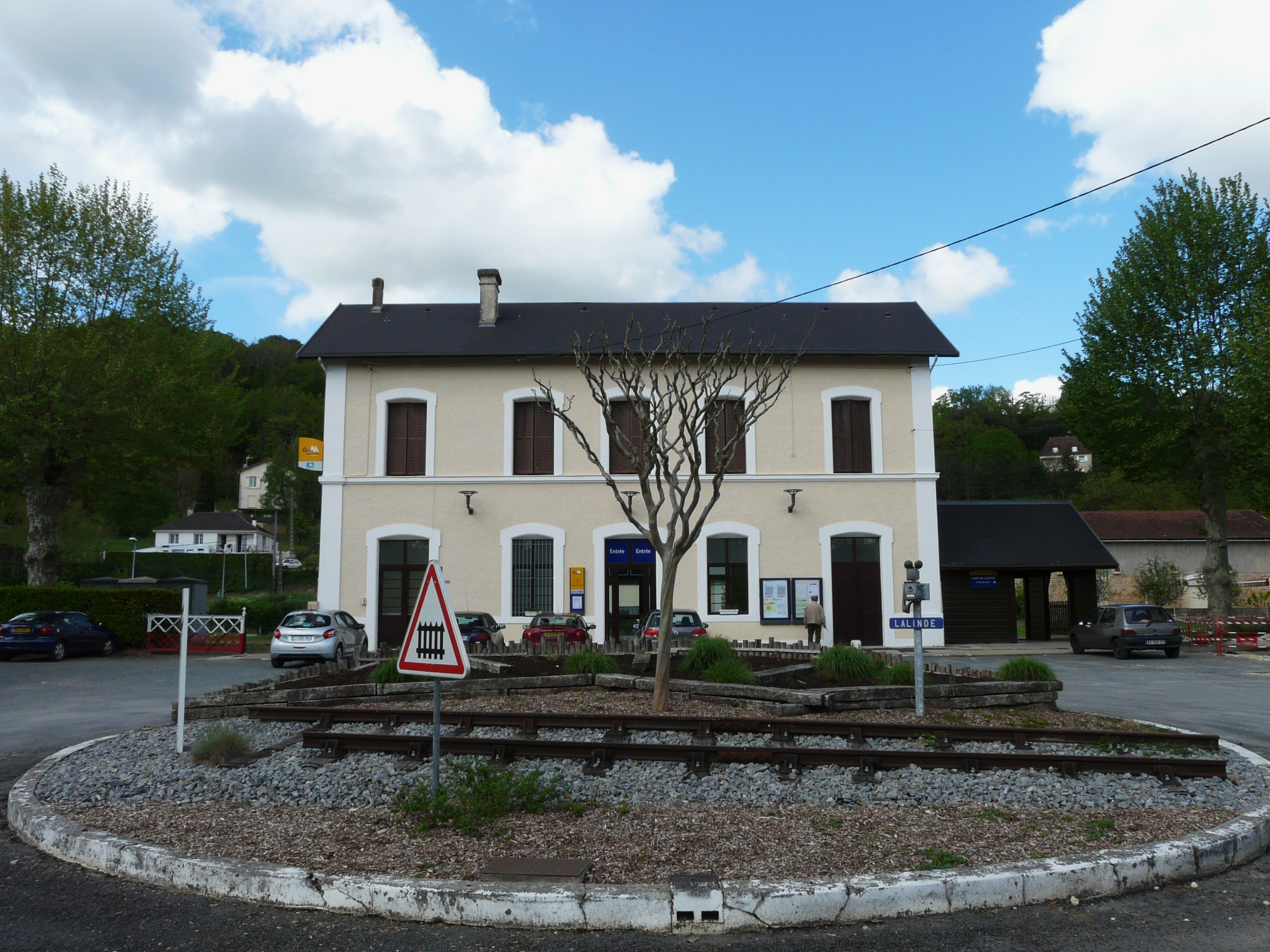
Lalinde station building

Lalinde is a railway station in Lalinde, Nouvelle-Aquitaine, France. The station is located on the Libourne - Le Buisson railway line. The station is served by TER (local) services operated by SNCF.

== Train services ==
The following services currently call at Lalinde:

- local service (TER Nouvelle-Aquitaine) Bordeaux - Libourne - Bergerac - Sarlat-la-Canéda

Preceding station	TER Nouvelle-Aquitaine	Following station
Couze towards Bordeaux	33	Mauzac towards Sarlat-la-Canéda
