= Siorac-en-Périgord =

- Commune
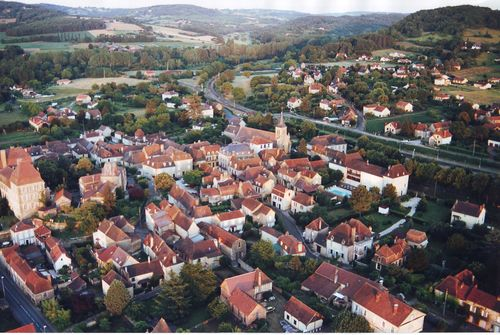
- An aerial view of Siorac-en-Périgord

- Coat of arms
- Location of Siorac-en-Périgord
- Location within France Location within Nouvelle-Aquitaine
- Coordinates: 44°49′20″N 0°59′15″E
- Country: France
- Region: Nouvelle-Aquitaine
- Department: Dordogne
- Arrondissement: Sarlat-la-Canéda
- Canton: Vallée Dordogne
- Intercommunality: Vallée de la Dordogne et Forêt Bessède

Government
  - Mayor (2020–2026): Didier Roques
- Area^{1}: 11.77 km^{2} (4.54 sq mi)
- Elevation: 60 m (200 ft)
- Highest elevation: 193 m (633 ft)
- Lowest elevation: 46 m (151 ft)
- Population (2023): 1,082
  - Density: 91.93/km^{2} (238.1/sq mi)
- Time zone: UTC+01:00 (CET)
  - Summer (DST): UTC+02:00 (CEST)
- INSEE/Postal code: 24538 /24170
- ^{1} French Land Register data, which excludes lakes, ponds, glaciers > 1 km^{2} (0.386 sq mi or 247 acres) and river estuaries.

Siorac-en-Périgord (French pronunciation: [sjɔʁak ɑ̃ peʁigɔʁ]; Occitan: Sieurac de Perigòrd) is a commune in the Dordogne department in Nouvelle-Aquitaine in southwestern France. Siorac-en-Périgord station has rail connections to Bordeaux, Périgueux, Sarlat-la-Canéda and Agen.

== Population ==
Historical population
Year	Pop.	±% p.a.
1968	784	—
1975	793	+0.16%
1982	863	+1.22%
1990	904	+0.58%
1999	893	−0.14%
2007	993	+1.34%
2012	1,023	+0.60%
2017	1,053	+0.58%
2023	1,082	+0.45%
Source: INSEE

== See also ==
- Communes of the Dordogne département
