= Mauzac-et-Grand-Castang =

- Commune
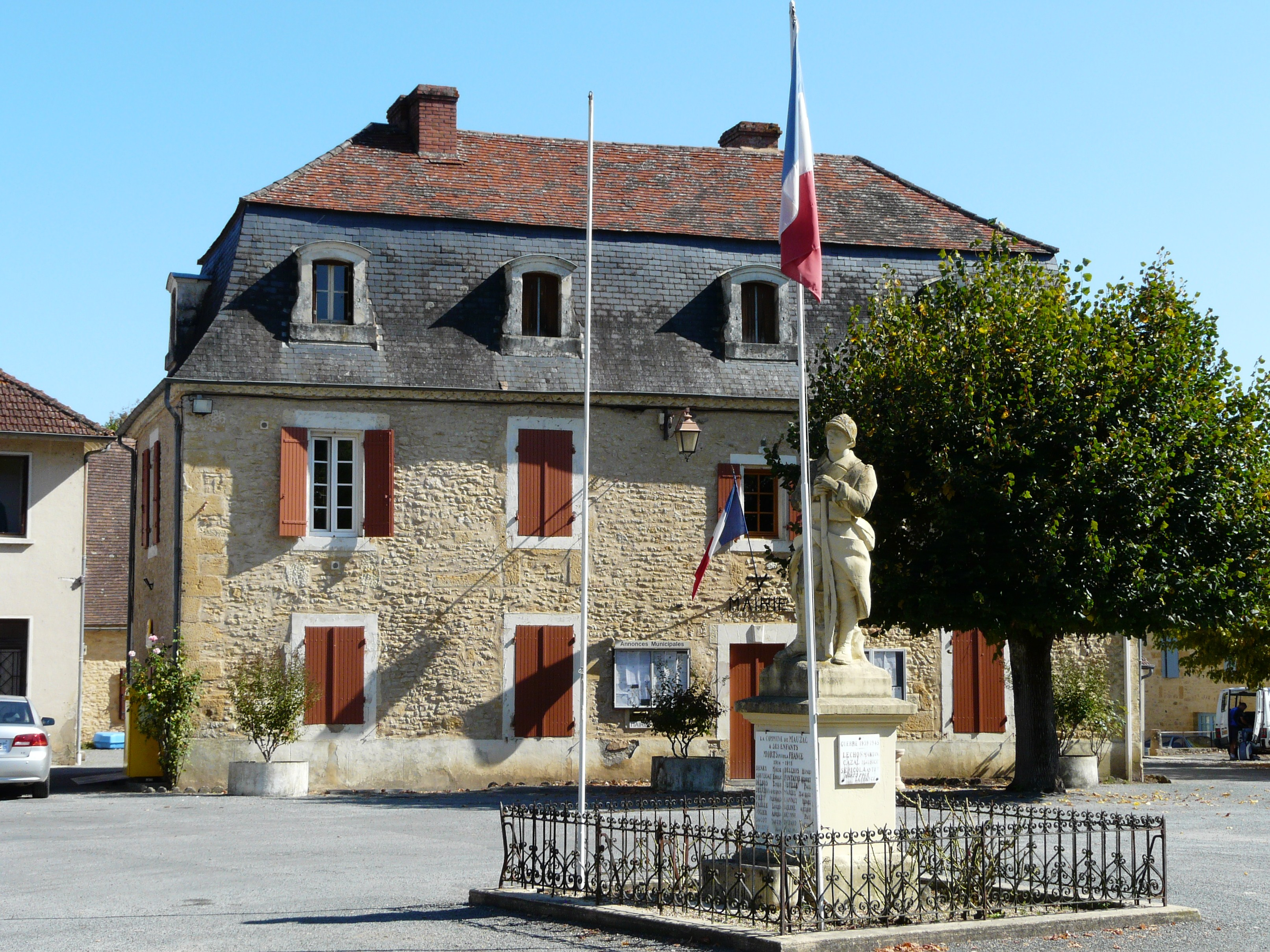
- The town hall in Mauzac

- Coat of arms
- Location of Mauzac-et-Grand-Castang
- Location within France Location within Nouvelle-Aquitaine
- Coordinates: 44°51′55″N 0°47′53″E
- Country: France
- Region: Nouvelle-Aquitaine
- Department: Dordogne
- Arrondissement: Bergerac
- Canton: Lalinde

Government
  - Mayor (2020–2026): Florent Farge
- Area^{1}: 15.85 km^{2} (6.12 sq mi)
- Elevation: 49 m (161 ft)
- Highest elevation: 207 m (679 ft)
- Lowest elevation: 35 m (115 ft)
- Population (2023): 879
  - Density: 55.5/km^{2} (144/sq mi)
- Time zone: UTC+01:00 (CET)
  - Summer (DST): UTC+02:00 (CEST)
- INSEE/Postal code: 24260 /24150
- ^{1} French Land Register data, which excludes lakes, ponds, glaciers > 1 km^{2} (0.386 sq mi or 247 acres) and river estuaries.

Mauzac-et-Grand-Castang (French pronunciation: [mozak e ɡʁɑ̃ kastɑ̃]; Occitan: Mausac e Grand Castanh) is a commune in the Dordogne department in Nouvelle-Aquitaine in southwestern France. Mauzac station has rail connections to Bordeaux, Bergerac and Sarlat-la-Canéda.

== History ==
Mauzac and Grand-Castang was created on 1 January 1973 by combining the former communes of Mauzac and Saint-Meyme de Rozens in the valley and Grand-Castang on the hillside.

The village has been occupied from prehistoric times, as is evidenced by numerous traces (fragments of axes, scrapers...).

Its past is closely linked with the Dordogne River, which became an important commercial and cultural route in the 18th and 19th centuries. Mauzac is one of the active ports that feed the interior of the region. Only a few vestiges of the built quay remain, just some paving stones cut in the old-fashioned way, identical to those still seen in Bordeaux. Constructions of the Canal de Lalinde to facilitate navigation for the scows, of the hydroelectric dam, and the arrival of the railway in the 19th century, changed the life of the village considerably.

== Population ==
Historical population
Year	Pop.	±% p.a.
1968	761	—
1975	688	−1.43%
1982	772	+1.66%
1990	958	+2.74%
1999	868	−1.09%
2007	842	−0.38%
2012	896	+1.25%
2017	864	−0.72%
2023	879	+0.29%
Source: INSEE

== Sights and monuments ==
- The site of the theatre: On the way, the stone huts (bories), including one with a flat roof. Vine growers used them as shelters. You can see a brick oven called "the peasants’ oven" ("le four des croquants"). It is not a "communal" oven, but one of the first wood ovens used by the poor peasants called "croquants". From this site, there is a very pretty view of the town and the river.
- The current port: The construction of a scow in the style of Coureau at the beginning of the century, offers sailing trips with wine-tasting and sampling high-end products of Périgord.
- The railway bridge: This ochre stone bridge is 254 meters long. It has seven arches, each with a 30-meter opening. The distinctive characteristic of this bridge is the elliptical shape of its arches and their low height compared to their width. Its design, daring for the time, offered an important drainage duct for a given width during floods. The solution adopted was to have a minimum of piers and thus a maximum of width for the arches.
- The lake: The dam's reservoir is a splendid lake, more than 1,000 hectares, an attractive centre for fishing, sailing, rowing, canoeing and kayaking. The developed banks are a meeting place for hikers. The "ferryman’s house" has been made into a showroom. Photographs and postcards of Mauzac in bygone days are available there. Upstairs, Electricité de France (EDF) has set up an exhibit about the hydroelectric evolution, and the Fishing and Hunting Federations offer a discovery of the surrounding wildlife.

== See also ==
- Communes of the Dordogne department
