= Saint-Cyprien station =

Railway station in Saint-Cyprien, France

Coordinates: 44°51′48″N 1°02′40″E

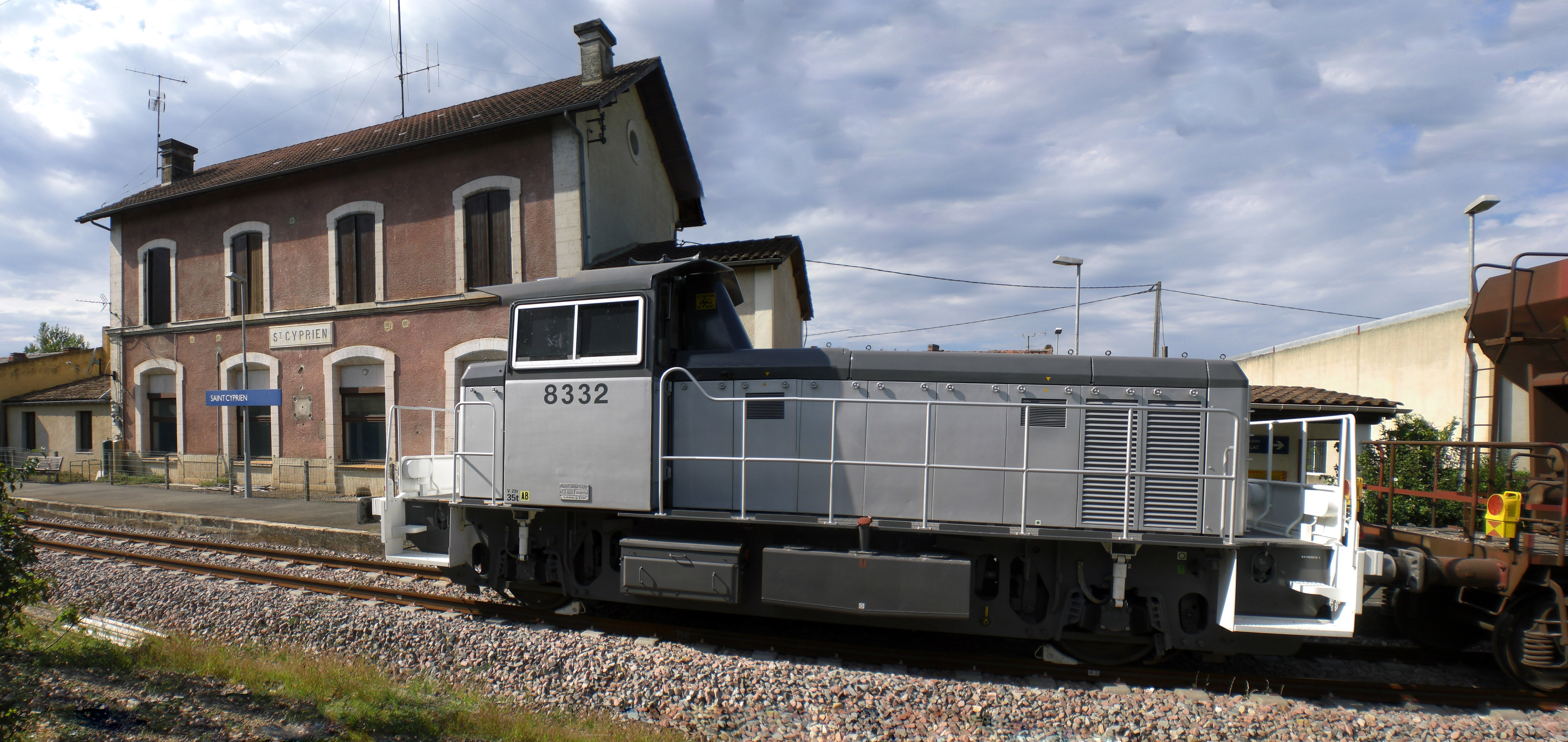
SNCF Class Y 8000 passing Saint Cyprien station

Saint-Cyprien is a railway station of modest size and importance in the village of Saint-Cyprien, Dordogne, France. The station is located on the Siorac-en-Périgord - Cazoulès railway line. The station is served by TER (local) services operated by the SNCF.

== Train services ==
The following services currently call at Saint-Cyprien:

- local service (TER Nouvelle-Aquitaine) Bordeaux - Libourne - Bergerac - Sarlat-la-Canéda
- local service (TER Nouvelle-Aquitaine) Périgueux - Sarlat-la-Canéda

Preceding station	TER Nouvelle-Aquitaine	Following station
Siorac-en-Périgord towards Bordeaux	33	Sarlat-la-Canéda Terminus
Siorac-en-Périgord towards Périgueux	34	Sarlat-la-Canéda Terminus
