= Saint-Cyprien, Dordogne =

Saint-Cyprien
- Commune
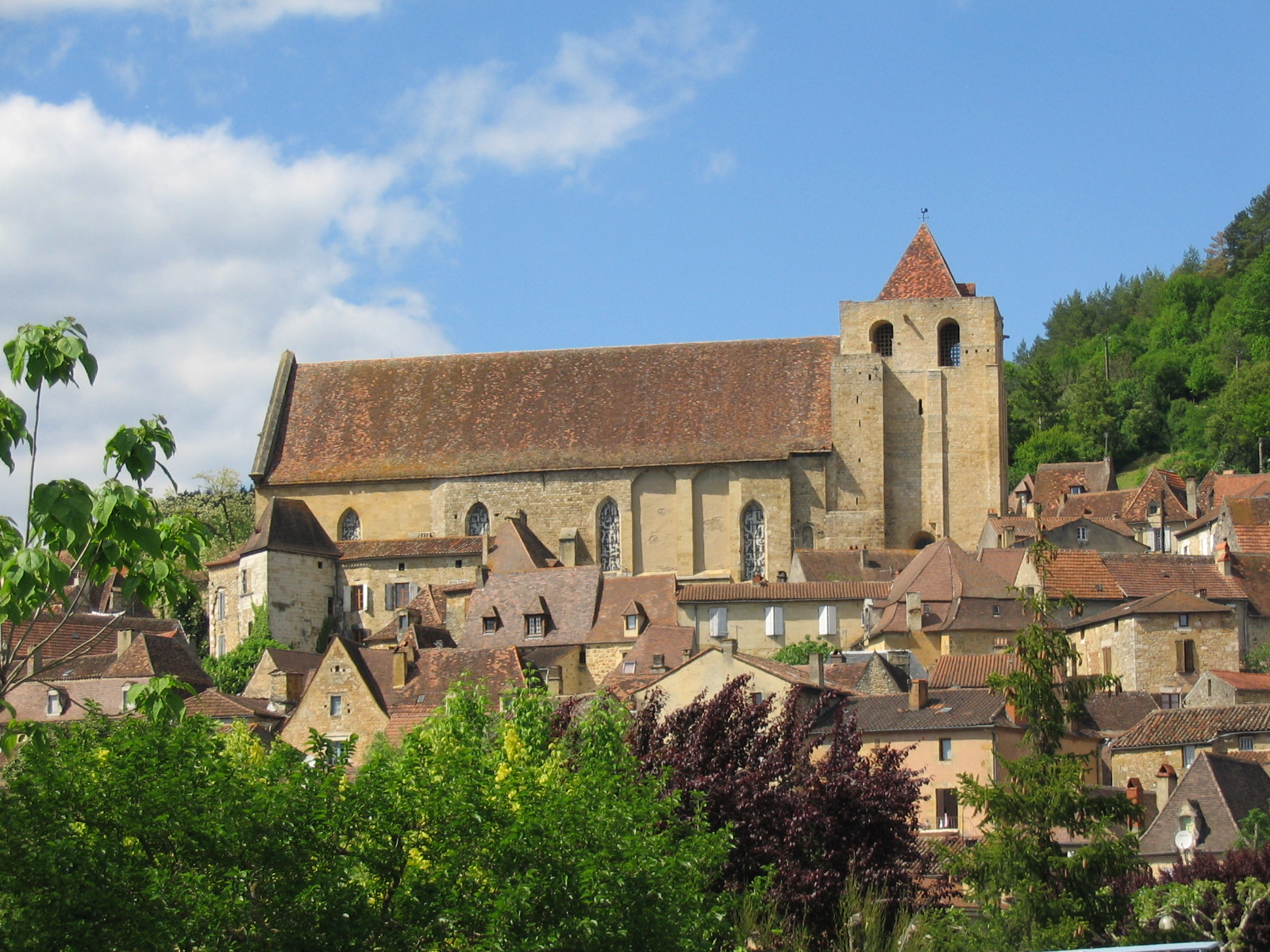
- The church in Saint-Cyprien

- Coat of arms
- Location of Saint-Cyprien
- Location within France Location within Nouvelle-Aquitaine
- Coordinates: 44°52′14″N 1°02′40″E
- Country: France
- Region: Nouvelle-Aquitaine
- Department: Dordogne
- Arrondissement: Sarlat-la-Canéda
- Canton: Vallée Dordogne
- Intercommunality: Vallée de la Dordogne et Forêt Bessède

Government
  - Mayor (2020–2026): Christian Six
- Area^{1}: 21.5 km^{2} (8.3 sq mi)
- Elevation: 64 m (210 ft)
- Highest elevation: 240 m (790 ft)
- Lowest elevation: 55 m (180 ft)
- Population (2023): 1,580
  - Density: 73.5/km^{2} (190/sq mi)
- Time zone: UTC+01:00 (CET)
  - Summer (DST): UTC+02:00 (CEST)
- INSEE/Postal code: 24396 /24220
- ^{1} French Land Register data, which excludes lakes, ponds, glaciers > 1 km^{2} (0.386 sq mi or 247 acres) and river estuaries.

Saint-Cyprien (French pronunciation: [sɛ̃ sipʁijɛ̃]; Occitan: Sent Cibra) is a commune and town in Dordogne, Nouvelle-Aquitaine, southwestern France.

It serves as the seat of the canton of Vallée Dordogne. It is the most populous commune in the canton. Saint-Cyprien station has rail connections to Bordeaux, Périgueux and Sarlat-la-Canéda.

== Population ==
Historical population
Year	Pop.	±% p.a.
1968	1,649	—
1975	1,763	+0.96%
1982	1,708	−0.45%
1990	1,593	−0.87%
1999	1,522	−0.51%
2007	1,567	+0.36%
2012	1,581	+0.18%
2017	1,561	−0.25%
2023	1,580	+0.20%
Source: INSEE

== Personality ==
- Joséphine Baker was the godmother of Saint-Cyprien Athletic club "(SCAC) rugby
- Bertrand de Got (1264–1314), Archbishop of Bordeaux, future Pope Clement V, places the monastery of Saint-Cyprien under his jurisdiction.

== See also ==
- Communes of the Dordogne department
- Gare de Saint-Cyprien
