= Jean Rey (physician) =

French chemist

Jean Rey (Note: French pronunciation: [ʒɑ̃ ʁɛ]) (c. 1583 – c. 1645), also known in English as John Rey, was a French physician and chemist.

Born in Le Bugue, in the Périgord (Dordogne département), he studied medicine at the University of Montpellier. He practised medicine in his native town and corresponded with René Descartes and Marin Mersenne.

He discovered that the weight of lead and tin increases when they are calcinated, and attributed this phenomenon to the weight of air, which he believed to become denser when heated (Essays, 1630). He explained the greater weight of calcinated lead and tin by supposing that calcination involves the incorporation of air in the metal. This hypothesis would later be confirmed by Antoine Lavoisier, over a century later in 1789.

His discovery of the weight of air also made possible the invention of the barometer by Evangelista Torricelli in 1643. He also developed a device called a "Thermoscope", a precursor of the thermometer.

Jean Rey died in Le Bugue, where he had lived all his life. The exact date of his death is disputed.
