= Milgranet =

Variety of grape

Milgranet is a red French wine grape variety that is predominantly grown in the Toulouse region of South West France. In addition to the red skin variety, there exist a rarer white skin clone known as Milgranet blanc that is often not seen in wine production. According to wine expert Jancis Robinson, Milgranet produces deeply colored wines with a firm tannic structure.

== Synonyms ==
Various synonyms have been used to describe Milgranet and its wines, including Mérille, Périgord, Petite Mérille and Périgord Noir.
