= Trémolat =

- Commune
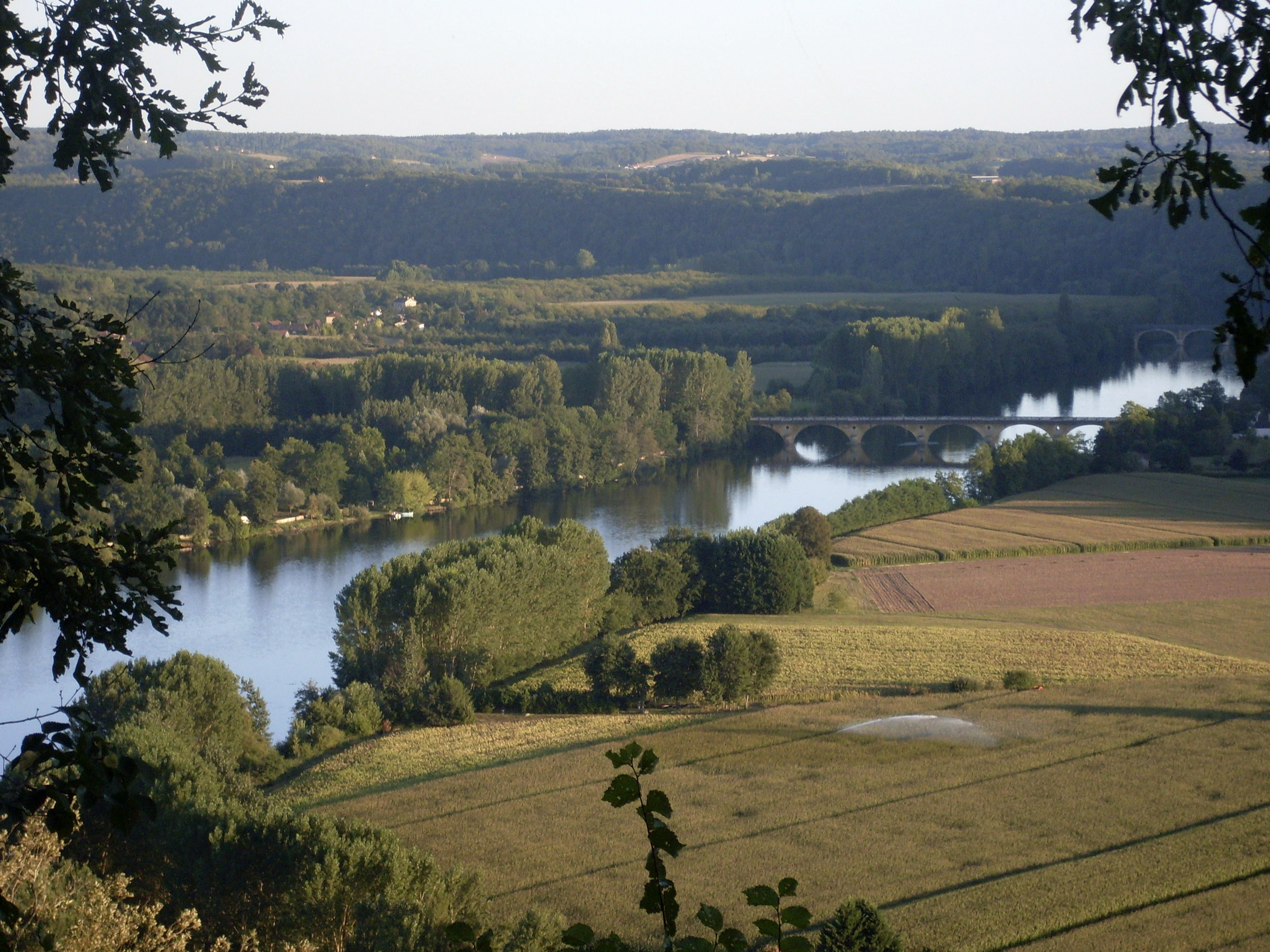
- A general view of Trémolat

- Coat of arms
- Location of Trémolat
- Location within France Location within Nouvelle-Aquitaine
- Coordinates: 44°52′34″N 0°49′53″E
- Country: France
- Region: Nouvelle-Aquitaine
- Department: Dordogne
- Arrondissement: Bergerac
- Canton: Périgord central
- Intercommunality: Bastides Dordogne-Périgord

Government
  - Mayor (2020–2026): Éric Chassagne
- Area^{1}: 14.03 km^{2} (5.42 sq mi)
- Elevation: 53 m (174 ft)
- Highest elevation: 186 m (610 ft)
- Lowest elevation: 41 m (135 ft)
- Population (2023): 624
  - Density: 44.5/km^{2} (115/sq mi)
- Time zone: UTC+01:00 (CET)
  - Summer (DST): UTC+02:00 (CEST)
- INSEE/Postal code: 24558 /24510
- ^{1} French Land Register data, which excludes lakes, ponds, glaciers > 1 km^{2} (0.386 sq mi or 247 acres) and river estuaries.

Trémolat (French pronunciation: [tʁemɔla]; Occitan: Tremolat) is a commune in the Dordogne department in Nouvelle-Aquitaine in southwestern France.

== Geography ==
Trémolat is 45 km (28 mi) from the town of Périgueux and is situated along the river Dordogne in the Périgord region. Trémolat station has rail connections to Bordeaux, Bergerac and Sarlat-la-Canéda.

== Population ==
Historical population
Year	Pop.	±% p.a.
1968	566	—
1975	508	−1.53%
1982	542	+0.93%
1990	625	+1.80%
1999	571	−1.00%
2007	666	+1.94%
2012	574	−2.93%
2017	652	+2.58%
2023	624	−0.73%
Source: INSEE

== Media ==
The director Claude Chabrol filmed Le Boucher (1970) in Trémolat.

== See also ==
- Communes of the Dordogne department
