= Lalinde =

- Commune
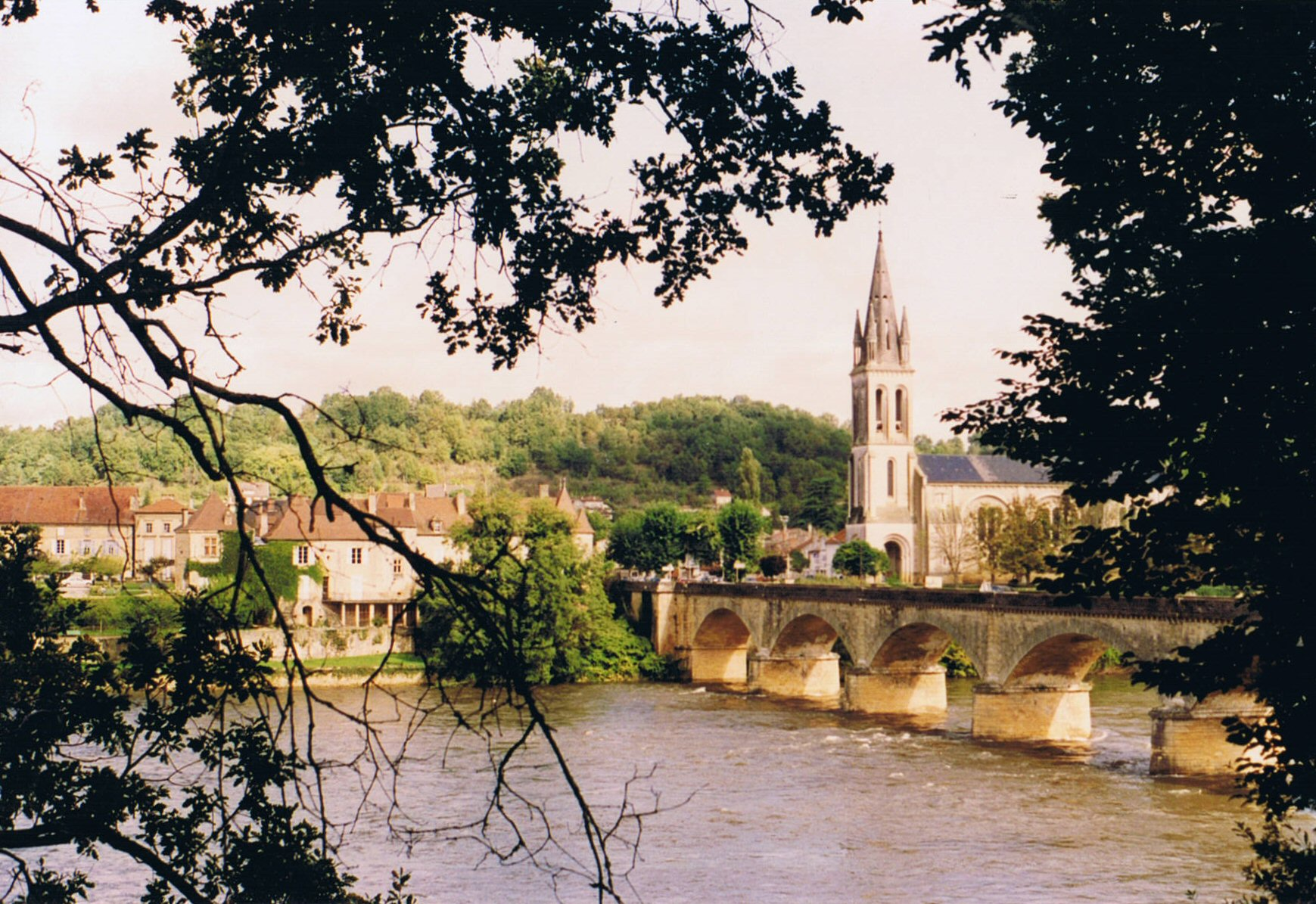
- Lalinde and the Dordogne

- Coat of arms
- Location of Lalinde
- Location within France Location within Nouvelle-Aquitaine
- Coordinates: 44°50′16″N 0°44′20″E
- Country: France
- Region: Nouvelle-Aquitaine
- Department: Dordogne
- Arrondissement: Bergerac
- Canton: Lalinde

Government
  - Mayor (2021–2026): Esther Fargues
- Area^{1}: 27.7 km^{2} (10.7 sq mi)
- Elevation: 47 m (154 ft)
- Highest elevation: 194 m (636 ft)
- Lowest elevation: 25 m (82 ft)
- Population (2023): 2,931
  - Density: 106/km^{2} (274/sq mi)
- Time zone: UTC+01:00 (CET)
  - Summer (DST): UTC+02:00 (CEST)
- INSEE/Postal code: 24223 /24150
- ^{1} French Land Register data, which excludes lakes, ponds, glaciers > 1 km^{2} (0.386 sq mi or 247 acres) and river estuaries.

Lalinde (French pronunciation: [lalɛ̃d]; Occitan: La Linda) is a commune in the Dordogne department in Nouvelle-Aquitaine in southwestern France. It lies on the river Dordogne and was enclosed within fortified walls of which little remains today. Lalinde station and Couze station have rail connections to Bordeaux, Bergerac and Sarlat-la-Canéda.

== History ==
In its past, it was a strategically important military site being the first "English bastide town"; it suffered various sieges during the Hundred Years' War and again in 1562 and 1572 during the Wars of Religion.

The train station was built in 1877 and the bridge over the Dordogne River in 1880, though there are signs of earlier crossings including a ford going back to Roman times.

In 1944 the local Resistance paid a heavy price when on 21 June many of Lalinde's sons perished in the Mouleydier massacre.

On 11 July 1964, during the 19th stage of the Tour de France, the worst accident in the history of the Tour took place. A tanker driven by a gendarme ran into spectators at a narrow bridge crossing the Lalinde canal at Port-de-Couze. Nine people died and another 13 were injured. A stone marker commemorates the event.

== Population ==
Historical population
Year	Pop.	±% p.a.
1968	3,291	—
1975	3,070	−0.99%
1982	2,949	−0.57%
1990	3,029	+0.34%
1999	2,966	−0.23%
2007	2,937	−0.12%
2012	2,953	+0.11%
2017	2,794	−1.10%
2023	2,931	+0.80%
Source: INSEE

== Twin towns ==
- (Belgium) Lubbeek
- (Germany) Linden
- (Netherlands) Cuijk
- (Spain) Lalín

== See also ==
- Communes of the Dordogne department
