= Sarlat-la-Canéda station =

Railway station in Sarlat-la-Canéda, France

Coordinates: 44°52′35″N 1°13′15″E

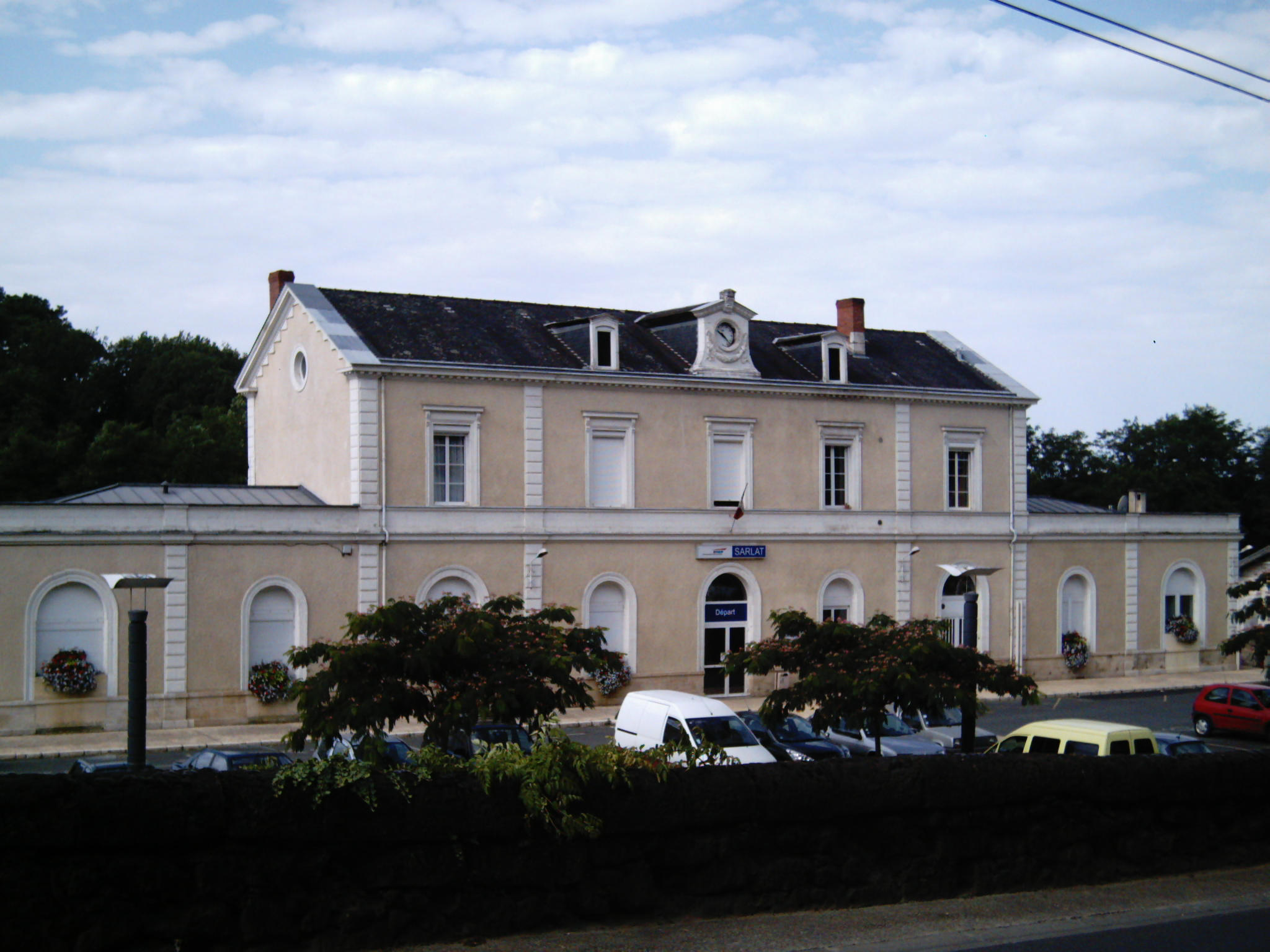
The station in 2007

Sarlat-la-Canéda or just Sarlat is a railway station in Sarlat-la-Canéda, Dordogne, France. The station opened in 1882 and is located on the Siorac-en-Périgord - Cazoulès railway line. The station is served by TER (local) services operated by the SNCF.

== Train services ==
The following services currently call at Sarlat:

- local service (TER Nouvelle-Aquitaine) Bordeaux - Libourne - Bergerac - Le Buisson - Sarlat-la-Canéda
- local service (TER Nouvelle-Aquitaine) Périgueux - Les Eysies - Le Buisson - Sarlat

Preceding station	TER Nouvelle-Aquitaine	Following station
Saint-Cyprien towards Bordeaux	33	Terminus
Saint-Cyprien towards Périgueux	34	Terminus

== Gallery ==
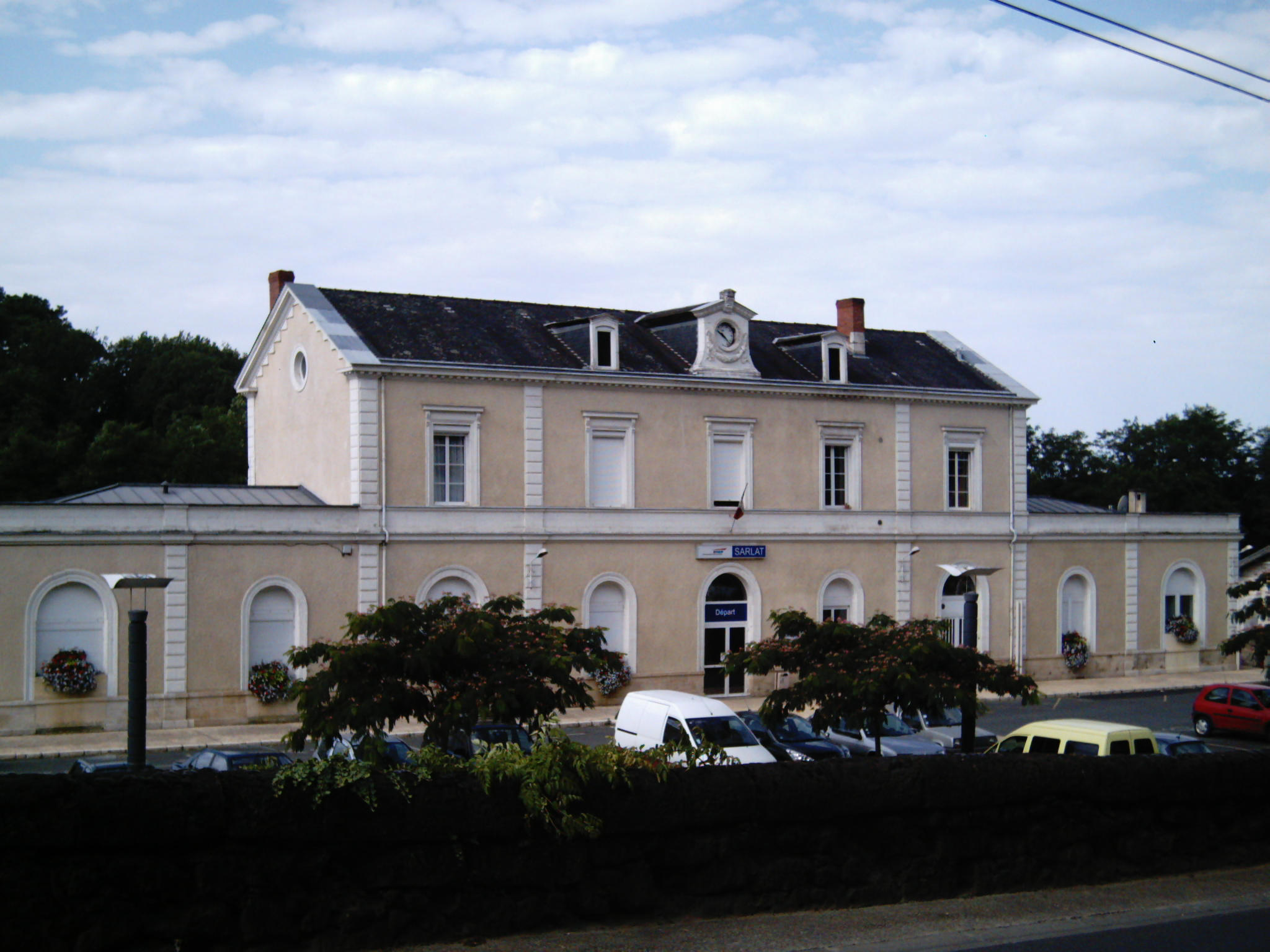
The station building.

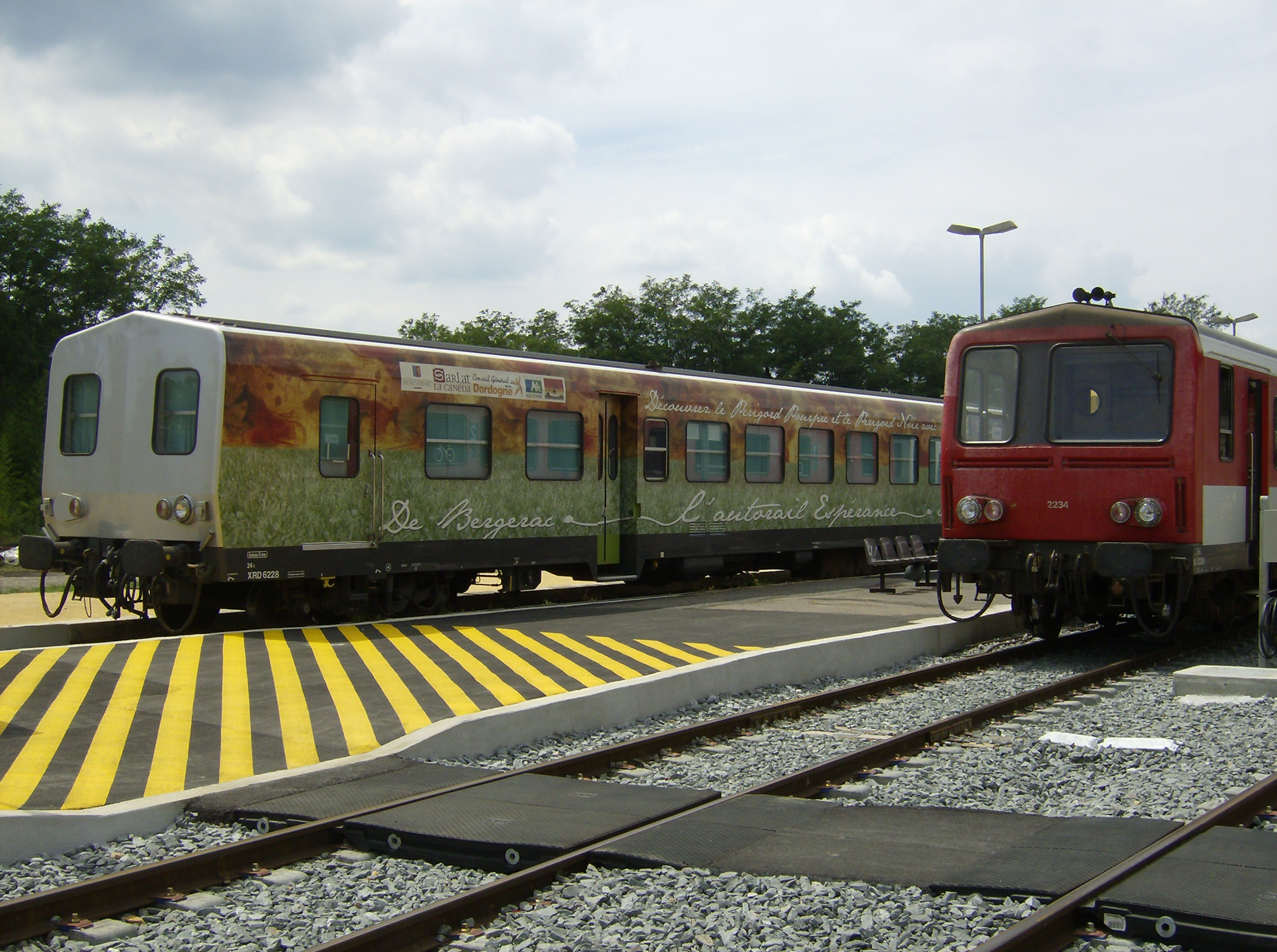
X2234 at Sarlat station with a trailer next to it.
