= TER Poitou-Charentes =

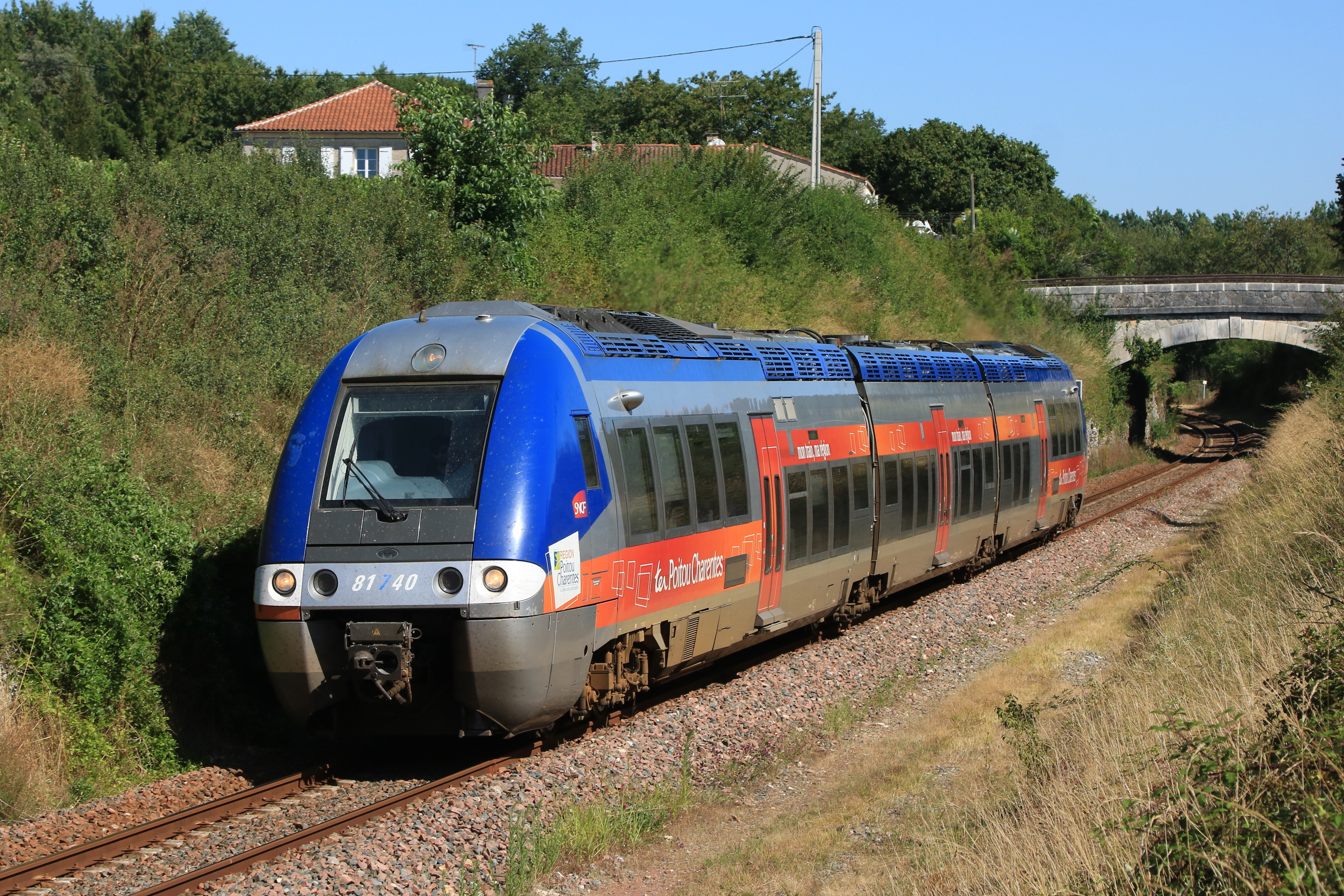
- B 81500 train in TER Pouitou-Charentes branding near Bourg-Charente.

Overview
- Owner: SNCF
- Area served: Nouvelle-Aquitaine, France
- Number of lines: 17
- Number of stations: 76
- Daily ridership: 9,700
- Website: http://www.sncf.com/en/trains/ter

Operation
- Began operation: 2002
- Ended operation: 2017
- Operator: SNCF

Technical
- Track gauge: 1,435 mm (4 ft 8 1/2 in) standard gauge

TER Poitou-Charentes was the regional rail network serving the Poitou-Charentes région in France. In 2017 it was merged into the new TER Nouvelle-Aquitaine.

== Network ==
=== Rail ===
Line	Route	Frequency	Notes
Angoulême – Bordeaux	Angoulême – Coutras – Libourne – Bordeaux-Saint-Jean (see TER Aquitaine line 16 for details)		
Bressuire – Saumur	Bressuire – Thouars – Saumur (see TER Pays de la Loire line 14 for details)		
Limoges – Angoulême	Limoges-Bénédictins – Chabanais – Angoulême (see TER Limousin line 3 for details)		
Niort – Royan	Niort – Saint-Jean-d'Angély – Saintes – Royan		
Poitiers – Angoulême	Poitiers – Ruffec – Angoulême		
Poitiers – Limoges	Poitiers – Montmorillon – Limoges-Bénédictins (see TER Limousin line 2 for details)		
La Rochelle – Bordeaux	La Rochelle – Rochefort – Saintes – Jonzac – Montendre – Bordeaux		
La Rochelle – Poitiers	La Rochelle – Surgères ... Niort ... Poitiers		
La Rochelle – Rochefort	La Rochelle-Porte Dauphine – La Rochelle – Rochefort		
Saintes – Angoulême	Saintes – Cognac – Jarnac – Angoulême		
Tours – Poitiers	Tours – Châtellerault – Poitiers (see TER Centre line 30 for details)		
† Not all trains call at this station

=== Road ===
- Angoulême – Jonzac
- Poitiers – Parthenay – Bressuire – Cholet – Nantes
- Thouars – Loudun – Chinon
- Poitiers – Chauvigny – Le Blanc – Châteauroux
- Niort – Fontenay-le-Comte
- La Rochelle – Fontenay-le-Comte

== Rolling Stock ==
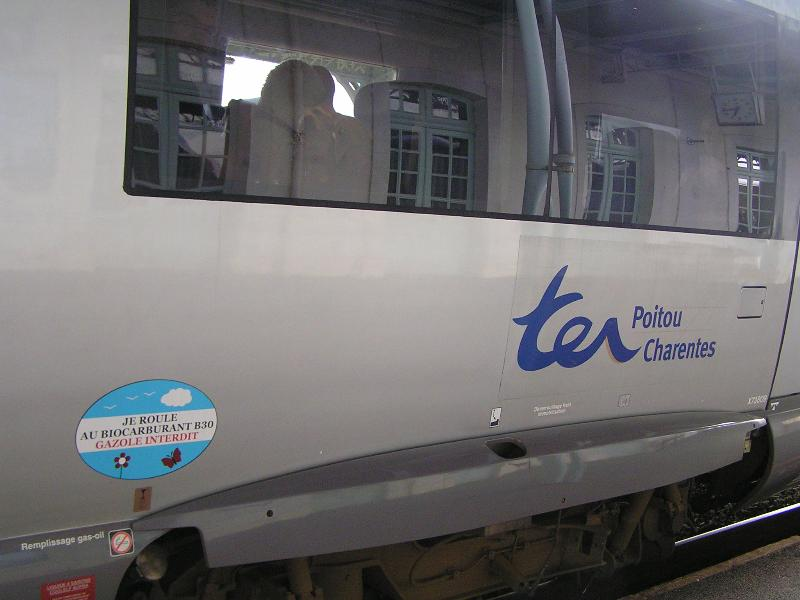
X 73500 et son logo biocarburant

=== Multiple units ===
- SNCF Class Z 7300
- SNCF Class Z 21500
- SNCF Class X 2100
- SNCF Class X 2200
- SNCF Class X 72500
- SNCF Class X 73500
- SNCF Class Z 27500 (ZGC Z 27500)

=== Locomotives ===
- SNCF Class BB 22200

=== Buses ===
- Iveco Bus
- Arway

== Future ==
=== Niort – Fontenay-le-Comte line ===
25% of this line, closed to passenger traffic since 1969, is located in Poitou-Charentes, with the remainder located in Pays de la Loire.

The reopening of the line was included in the Contract for Regional and State Projects (Contrat de projets État-région) for 2006-2007 and preliminary studies are completed. Work was scheduled to begin once the interregional budget was in place but as of October 2014, the line has not been reopened and TER's operations between Niort and Fontenay-le-Comte are restricted to bus travel.

=== Thouars – Parthenay – Niort line ===
This line has been closed to passenger traffic since 1980 but it is still used to transport empty TER trains every Wednesday. The trains are from the Bressuire – Thouars – Saumur line and they are sent to Saintes for maintenance. These trains are allowed to travel at speeds between 70 and 80 km/h, although higher speeds would be possible on certain sections of the line.

=== Expansion of the La Rochelle-Rochefort line ===
With 11 trains a day added between in 2007 and 2008, the expansion of this line is meant to help curb the growing road traffic between the cities of La Rochelle and Rochefort.

Five additional stops have been opened:

- Saint-Laurent Fouras (September 2007)
- Angoulins-sur-Mer (September 2007)
- La Rochelle Porte Dauphine (late 2008)
- Aytré-Plage (September 2008)
- Tonnay-Charente (2010)

== See also ==
- SNCF
- Transport express régional
- Réseau Ferré de France
- List of SNCF stations
- List of SNCF stations in Poitou-Charentes
- Poitou-Charentes
