= Ustaritz station =

Railway station in Ustaritz, France

Coordinates: 43°24′19″N 1°26′58″W

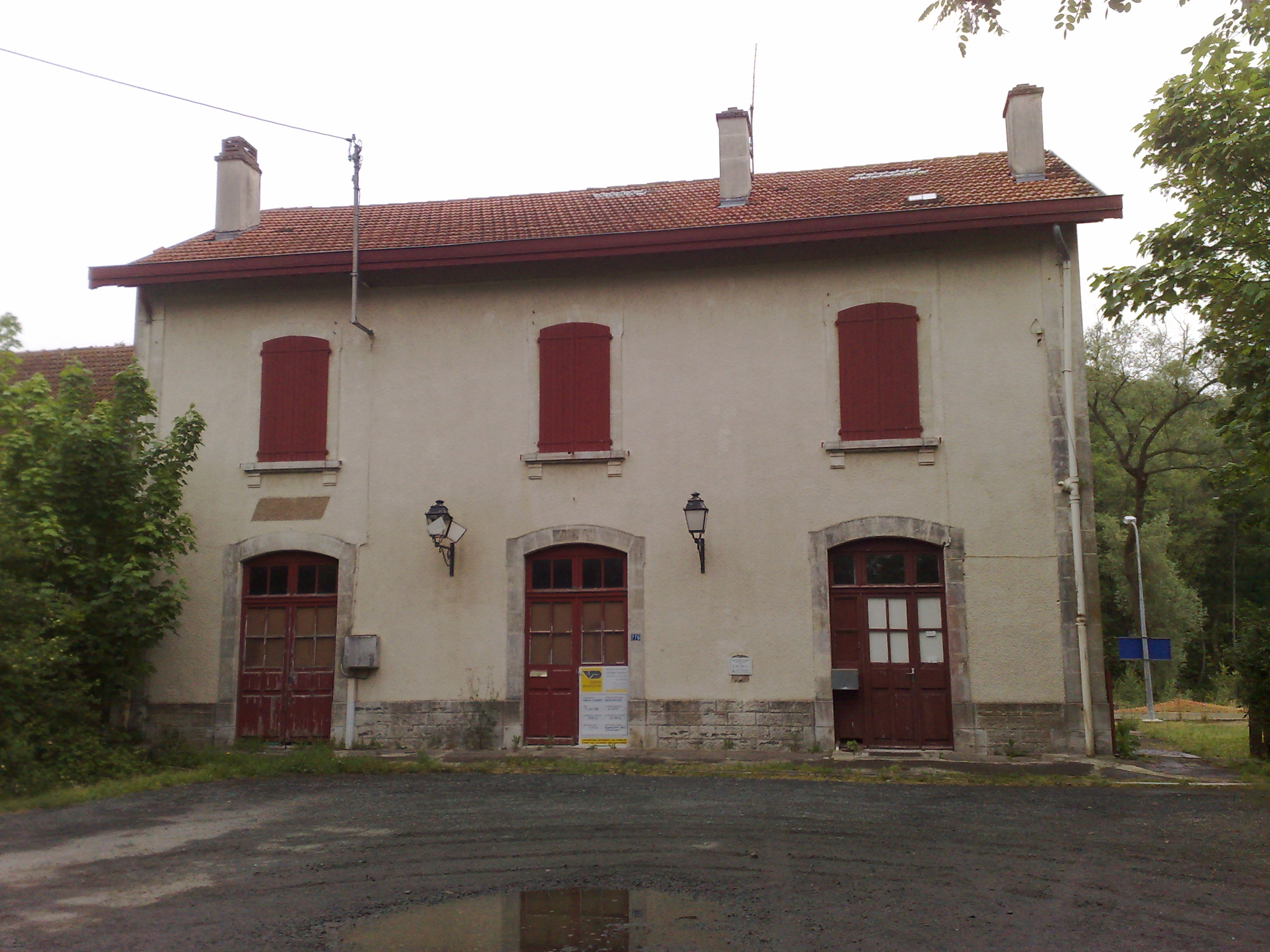
Ustaritz station building

Ustaritz or Uztaritze is a railway station in Ustaritz, Nouvelle-Aquitaine, France. The station was opened in 1891 and is located on the Bayonne - Saint-Jean-Pied-de-Port railway line. The station is served by TER (local) services operated by the SNCF.

== Train services ==
The following services currently call at Ustaritz:

- local service (TER Nouvelle-Aquitaine) Bayonne - Saint-Jean-Pied-de-Port

| Preceding station | TER Nouvelle-Aquitaine | Following station |
|---|---|---|
| Villefranque towards Bayonne | 54 | Halsou-Larressore towards Saint-Jean-Pied-de-Port |
| Villefranque towards Bayonne | 54U | Halsou-Larressore towards Cambo-les-Bains |
