= Villefranque station =

Railway station in Villefranque, France

Coordinates: 43°25′52″N 1°27′23″W

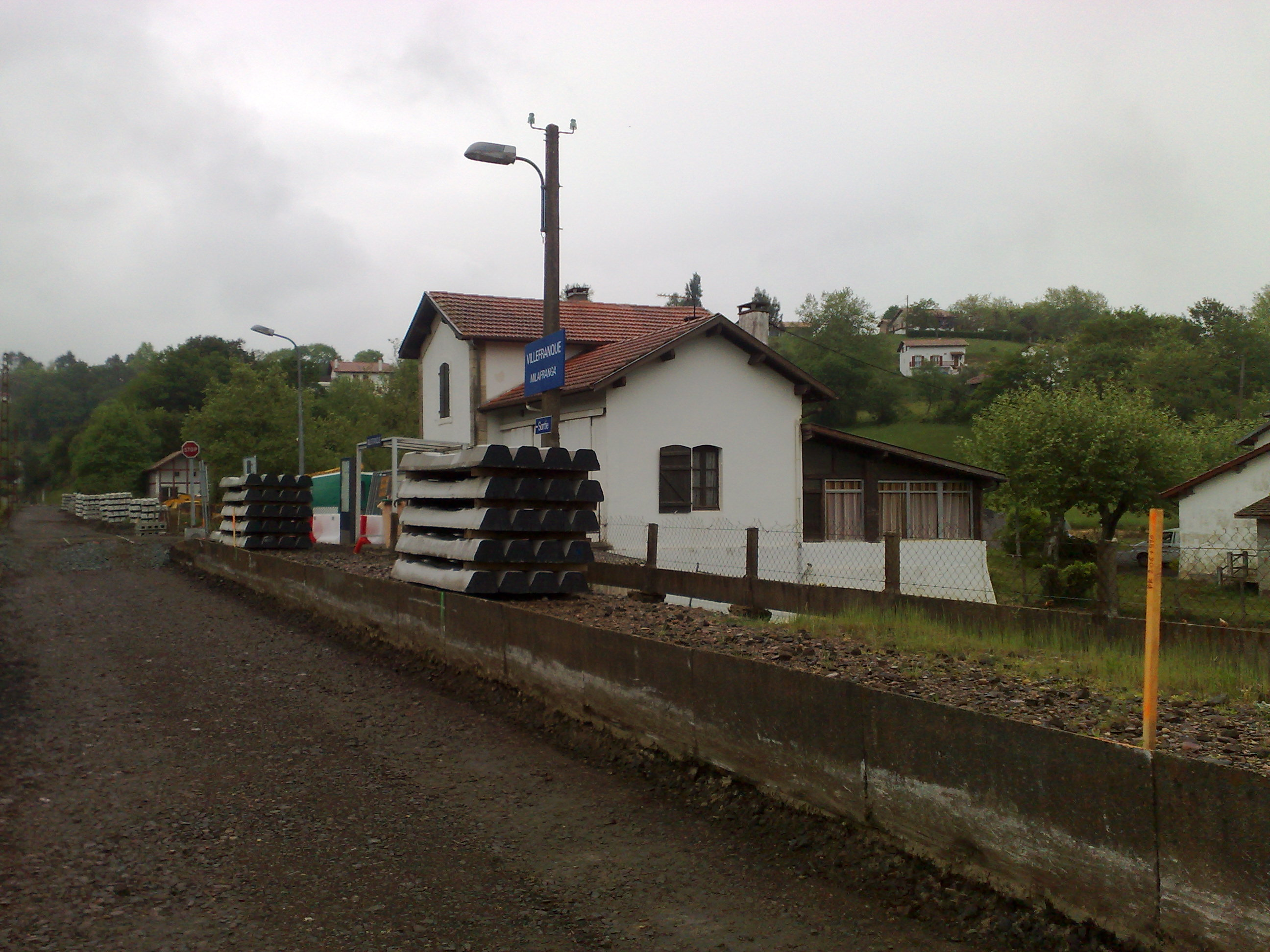
Villefranque station during track renewal

Villefranque or Milafranga is a railway station in Villefranque, Nouvelle-Aquitaine, France. The station was opened in 1891 and is located on the Bayonne - Saint-Jean-Pied-de-Port railway line. The station is served by TER (local) services operated by the SNCF.

== Train services ==
The following services currently call at Villefranque:

- local service (TER Nouvelle-Aquitaine) Bayonne - Saint-Jean-Pied-de-Port

Preceding station	TER Nouvelle-Aquitaine	Following station
Bayonne Terminus	54	Ustaritz towards Saint-Jean-Pied-de-Port
Bayonne Terminus	54U	Ustaritz towards Cambo-les-Bains
