= Bidarray-Pont-Noblia station =

Railway station in Bidarray, France

Coordinates: 43°16′06″N 1°20′42″W

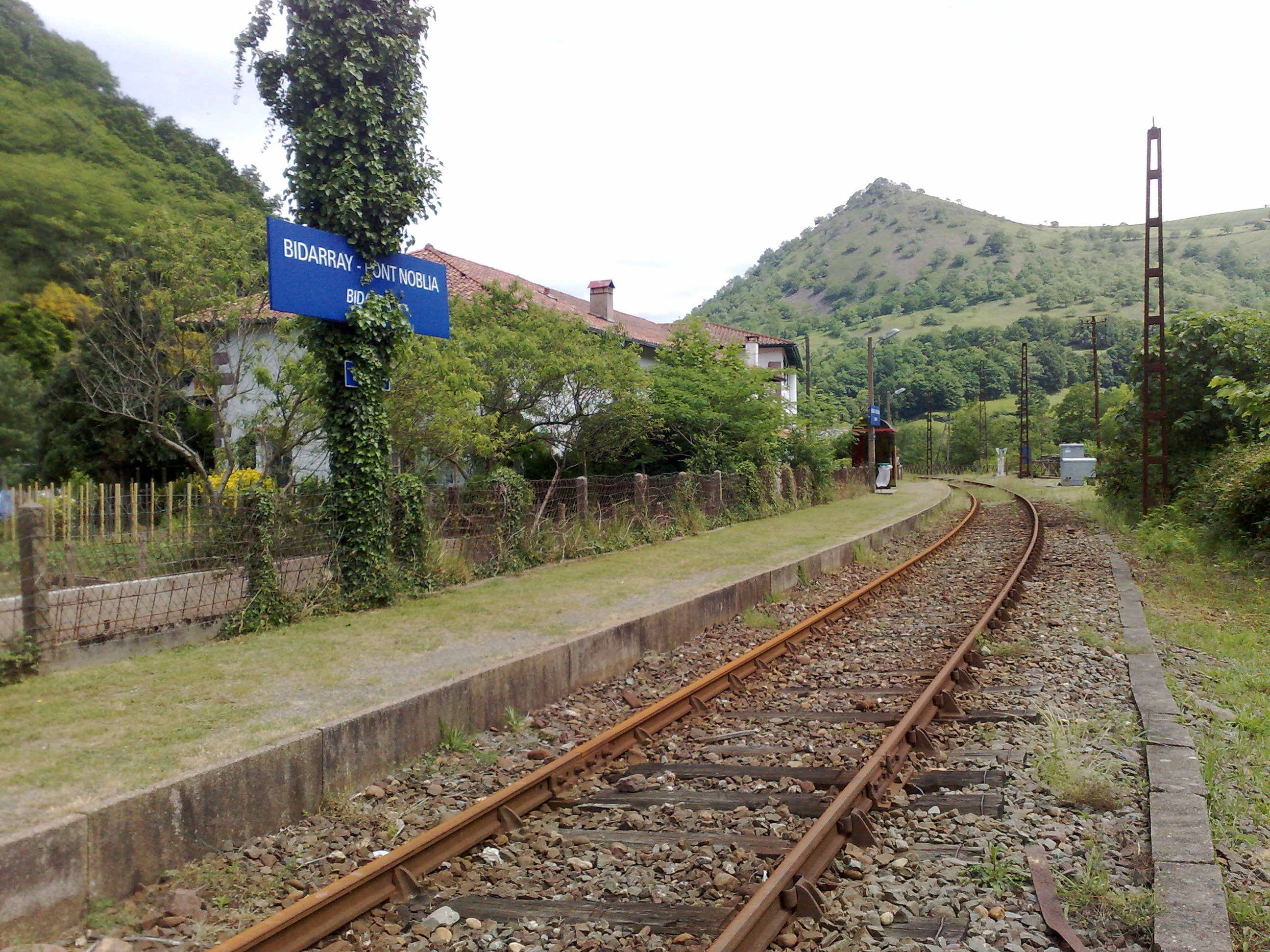
Bidarray-Pont-Noblia station

Bidarray-Pont-Noblia or Bidarrai is a railway station in Bidarray, Nouvelle-Aquitaine, France. The station was opened in 1892 and is located on the Bayonne - Saint-Jean-Pied-de-Port railway line. The station is served by TER (local) services operated by the SNCF.

== Train services ==
The following services currently call at Bidarray-Pont-Noblia:

- local service (TER Nouvelle-Aquitaine) Bayonne - Saint-Jean-Pied-de-Port

Preceding station	TER Nouvelle-Aquitaine	Following station
Cambo-les-Bains towards Bayonne	54	Ossès-Saint-Martin-d'Arrossa towards Saint-Jean-Pied-de-Port

== See also ==
- List of SNCF stations in Nouvelle-Aquitaine
