= Halsou–Larressore station =

Railway station in Halsou, France

Coordinates: 43°22′40″N 1°25′39″W

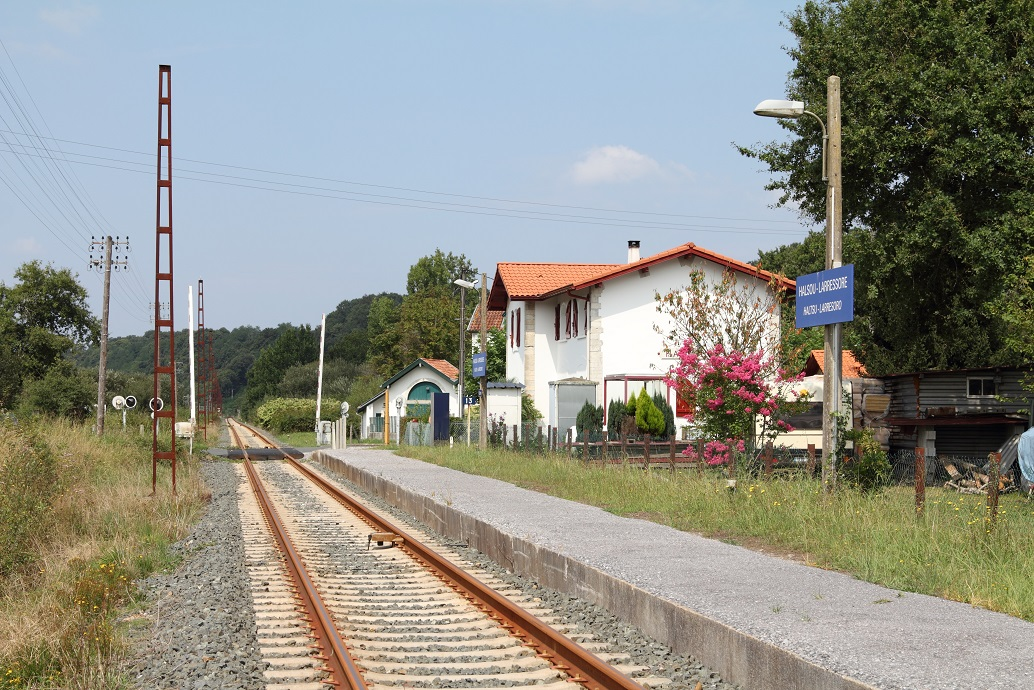
Halsou-Larressore station

Halsou-Larressore or Haltsu-Larressoro is a railway station in Halsou, Nouvelle-Aquitaine, France. The station was opened in 1891 and is located on the Bayonne - Saint-Jean-Pied-de-Port railway line. The station is served by TER (local) services operated by the SNCF.

== Train services ==
The following services currently call at Halsou-Larressore:

- local service (TER Nouvelle-Aquitaine) Bayonne - Saint-Jean-Pied-de-Port

Preceding station	TER Nouvelle-Aquitaine	Following station
Ustaritz towards Bayonne	54	Cambo-les-Bains towards Saint-Jean-Pied-de-Port
Ustaritz towards Bayonne	54U	Cambo-les-Bains Terminus
