= Ossès–Saint-Martin-d'Arrossa station =

Railway station in France

Coordinates: 43°14′06″N 1°18′17″W

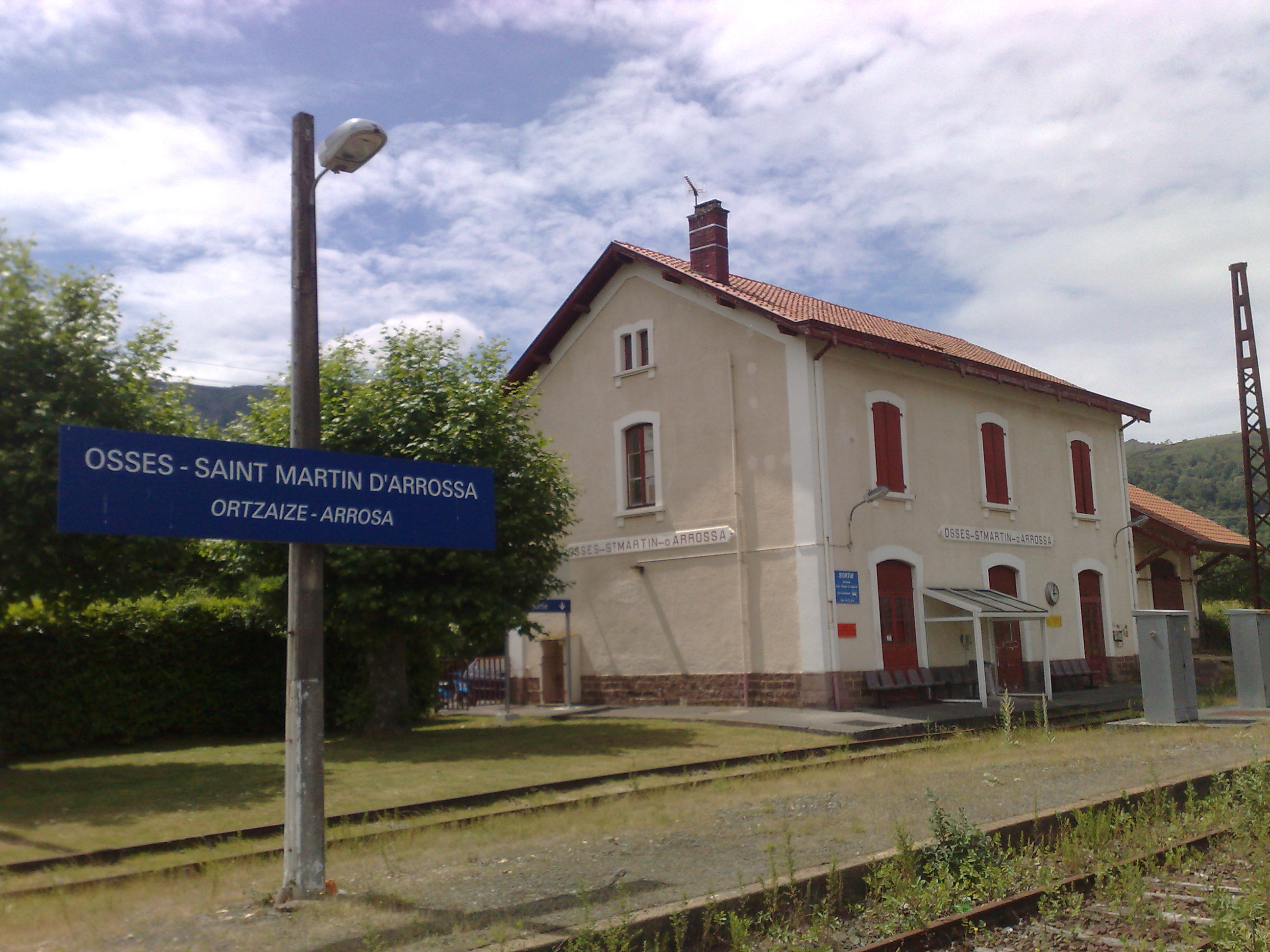
Ossès-Saint-Martin-d'Arrossa station

Ossès-Saint-Martin-d'Arrossa or Ortzaize-Arrossa is a railway station in Saint-Martin-d'Arrossa, Nouvelle-Aquitaine, France. The station was opened in 1892 and is located on the Bayonne - Saint-Jean-Pied-de-Port railway line. The station is served by TER (local) services operated by the SNCF.

== Train services ==
The following services currently call at Ossès-Saint-Martin-d'Arrossa:

- local service (TER Nouvelle-Aquitaine) Bayonne - Saint-Jean-Pied-de-Port

Preceding station	TER Nouvelle-Aquitaine	Following station
Bidarray-Pont-Noblia towards Bayonne	54	Saint-Jean-Pied-de-Port Terminus
