= Saintes station =

Railway station in Saintes, France

Coordinates: 45°44′55″N 0°37′4″W

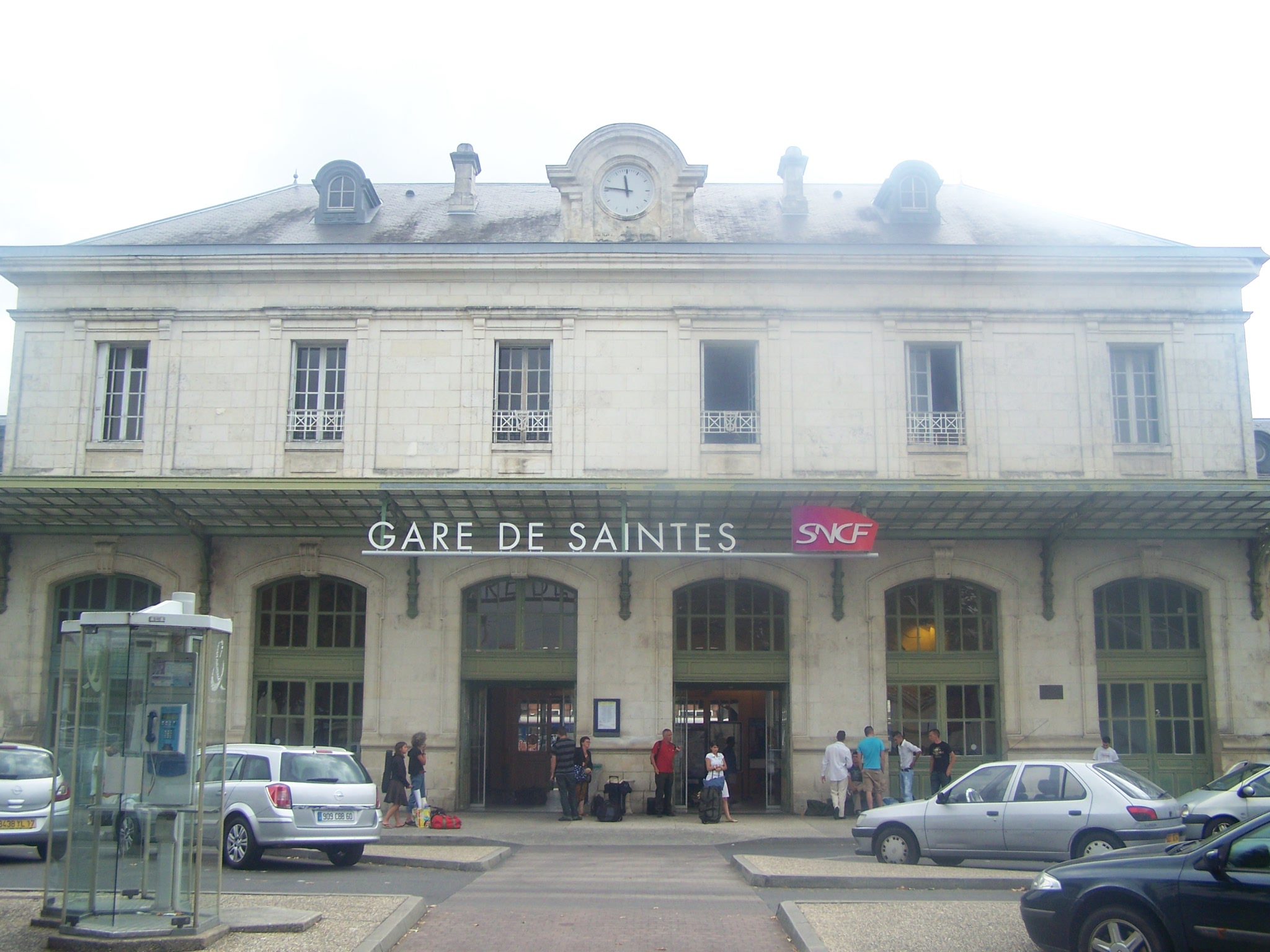
Saintes station entrance

Gare de Saintes is a railway station serving the town Saintes, Charente-Maritime department, southwestern France.

== Services ==
The following train services call at the station as of January 2021:

- intercity services (Intercités) Nantes - La Rochelle - Bordeaux
- regional services (TER Nouvelle-Aquitaine) La Rochelle - Rochefort - Saintes - Bordeaux
- regional services (TER Nouvelle-Aquitaine) Royan - Saintes - Angoulême
- regional services (TER Nouvelle-Aquitaine) Niort - Saintes - Royan

Preceding station	SNCF	Following station
Rochefort towards Nantes	Intercités	Jonzac towards Bordeaux
Preceding station	TER Nouvelle-Aquitaine	Following station
Saint-Savinien towards La Rochelle	15	Pons towards Bordeaux
Saujon towards Royan	16	Beillant towards Angoulême
Saint-Hilaire-Brizambourg towards Niort	17	Saujon towards Royan
