= Surgères station =

Railway station in Surgères, France

Coordinates: 46°6′48″N 0°45′44″W

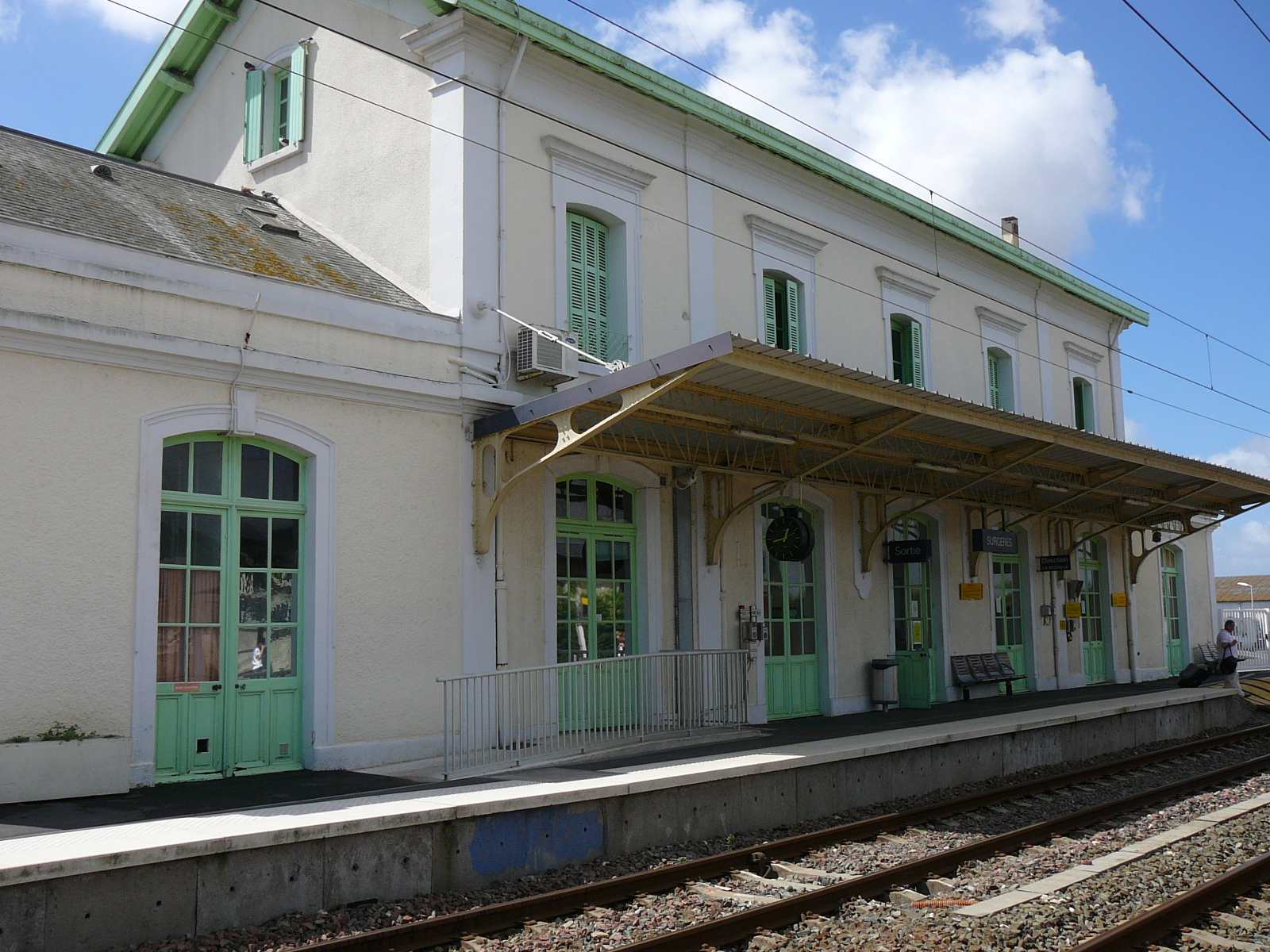
Surgères station

Surgères is a railway station in Surgères, France. It is served by both TER Nouvelle-Aquitaine and TGV:

- La Rochelle - Gare Montparnasse (TGV Atlantique)
- La Rochelle - Poitiers (TER Nouvelle-Aquitaine)

Preceding station	TER Nouvelle-Aquitaine	Following station
Aigrefeuille towards La Rochelle	14	Mauzé towards Poitiers
Preceding station	SNCF	Following station
Niort towards Montparnasse	TGV	La Rochelle Terminus
