= Cambo-les-Bains station =

Railway station in Cambo-les-Bains, France

Coordinates: 43°21′56″N 1°23′50″W

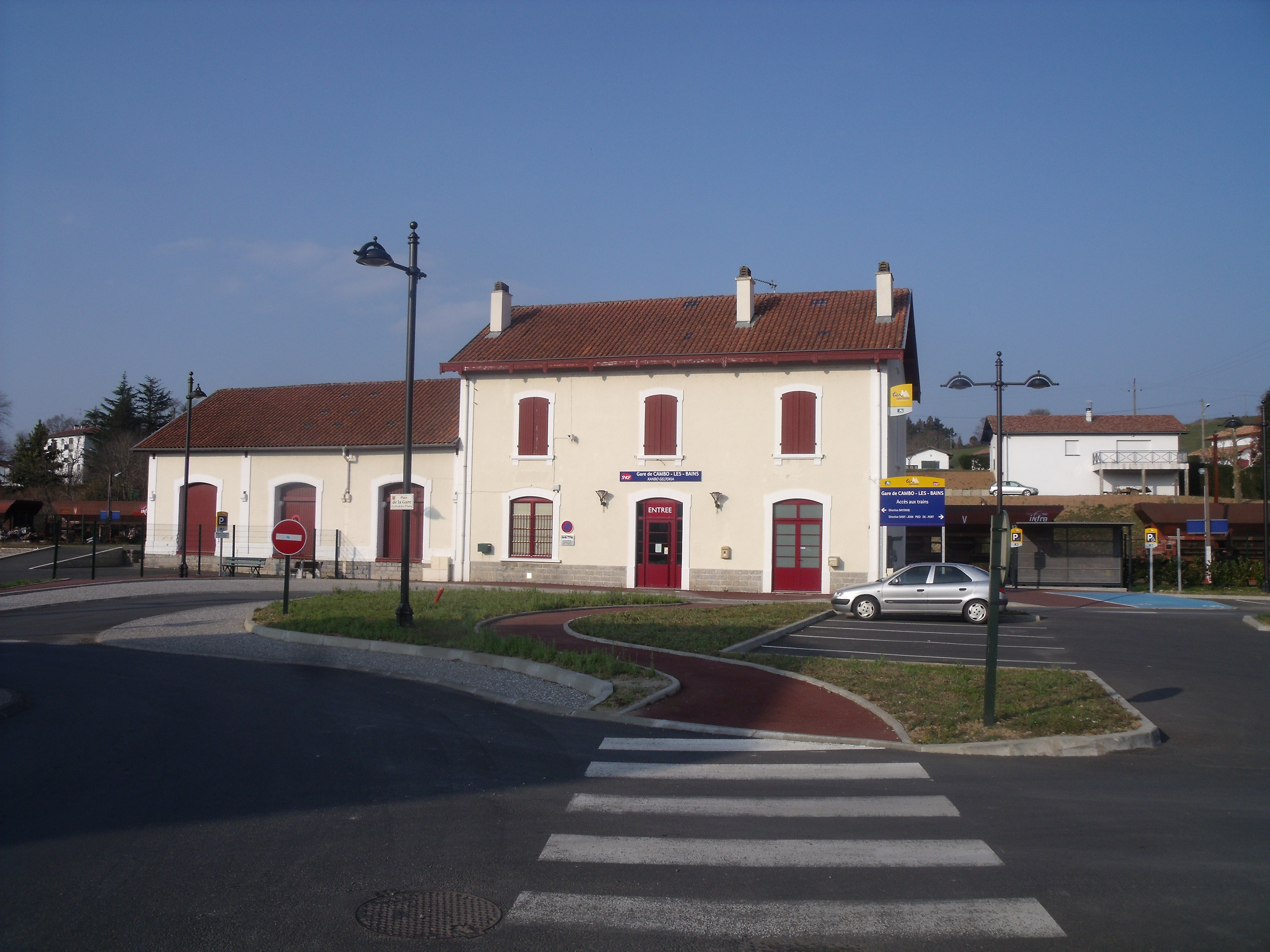
Cambo-les-Bains station

Cambo-les-Bains station (French: Gare de Cambo-les-Bains; Basque: Kanbo Geltokia) is a railway station in Cambo-les-Bains, Nouvelle-Aquitaine, France. The station was opened in 1891 and is located on the Bayonne - Saint-Jean-Pied-de-Port railway line. The station is served by TER (local) services operated by the SNCF.

== Train services ==
The following services currently call at Cambo-les-Bains:

- local service (TER Nouvelle-Aquitaine) Bayonne - Saint-Jean-Pied-de-Port

Preceding station	TER Nouvelle-Aquitaine	Following station
Halsou-Larressore towards Bayonne	54	Bidarray-Pont-Noblia towards Saint-Jean-Pied-de-Port
Halsou-Larressore towards Bayonne	54U	Terminus
