= Parthenay station =

Former railway station in Parthenay, France

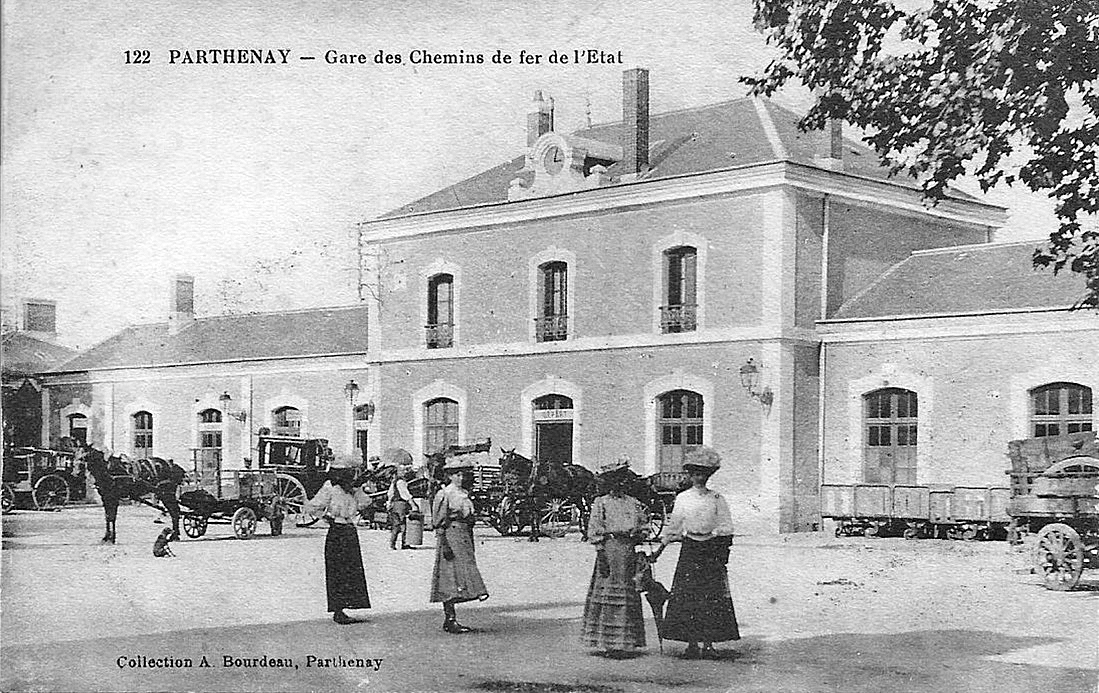
Early 20th century photo of the station square with the cars waiting for travelers

The Gare de Parthenay is a former railway station – now closed to passengers except as a bus station – in the town of Parthenay, in the department of Deux-Sèvres, western France. It was formerly a junction on the Chemins de Fer de l'État main line from Paris (via Thouars and Parthenay) to Niort and Bordeaux, with branch lines running to Poitiers and Bressuire. However, only the lines to Niort and Thouars survive, today carrying no more than the occasional freight train.

The station is currently served by a long-distance bus service from Nantes to Poitiers that forms part of the SNCF's TER Nouvelle-Aquitaine network, and by inter-urban buses of the Réseau routier des Deux-Sèvres connecting Parthenay to Niort, Bressuire, Thouars, and other local towns and villages. The station buildings remain open, and contain separate booking offices for SNCF and Réseau des Deux-Sèvres bus services.
