= Rochefort station =

Railway station in Rochefort, France

Coordinates: 45°56′51″N 0°57′49″W

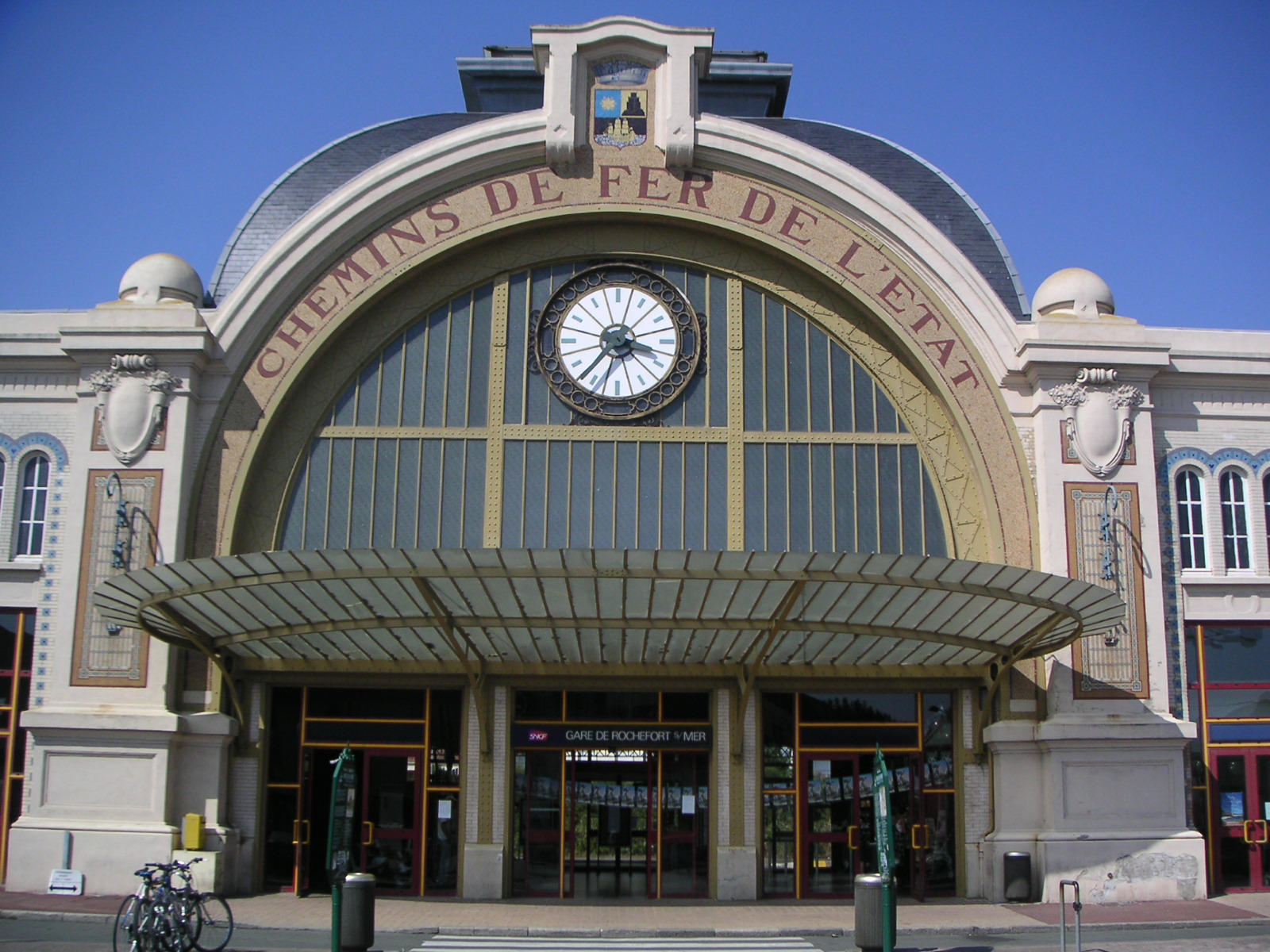
Rochefort station entrance

Gare de Rochefort is a railway station serving the town of Rochefort, Charente-Maritime department, southwestern France.

== Services ==
The following train services serve the station as of January 2021:

- intercity services (Intercités) Nantes - La Rochelle - Bordeaux
- regional services (TER Nouvelle-Aquitaine) La Rochelle - Rochefort - Saintes - Bordeaux
- local services (TER Nouvelle-Aquitaine) La Rochelle - Rochefort

Preceding station	SNCF	Following station
La Rochelle towards Nantes	Intercités	Saintes towards Bordeaux
Preceding station	TER Nouvelle-Aquitaine	Following station
Châtelaillon towards La Rochelle	15	Tonnay-Charente towards Bordeaux
Saint-Laurent-Fouras towards La Rochelle-Porte Dauphine	15U	Terminus
