= Villefranque, Pyrénées-Atlantiques =

Villefranque Milafranga (Basque)
- Commune
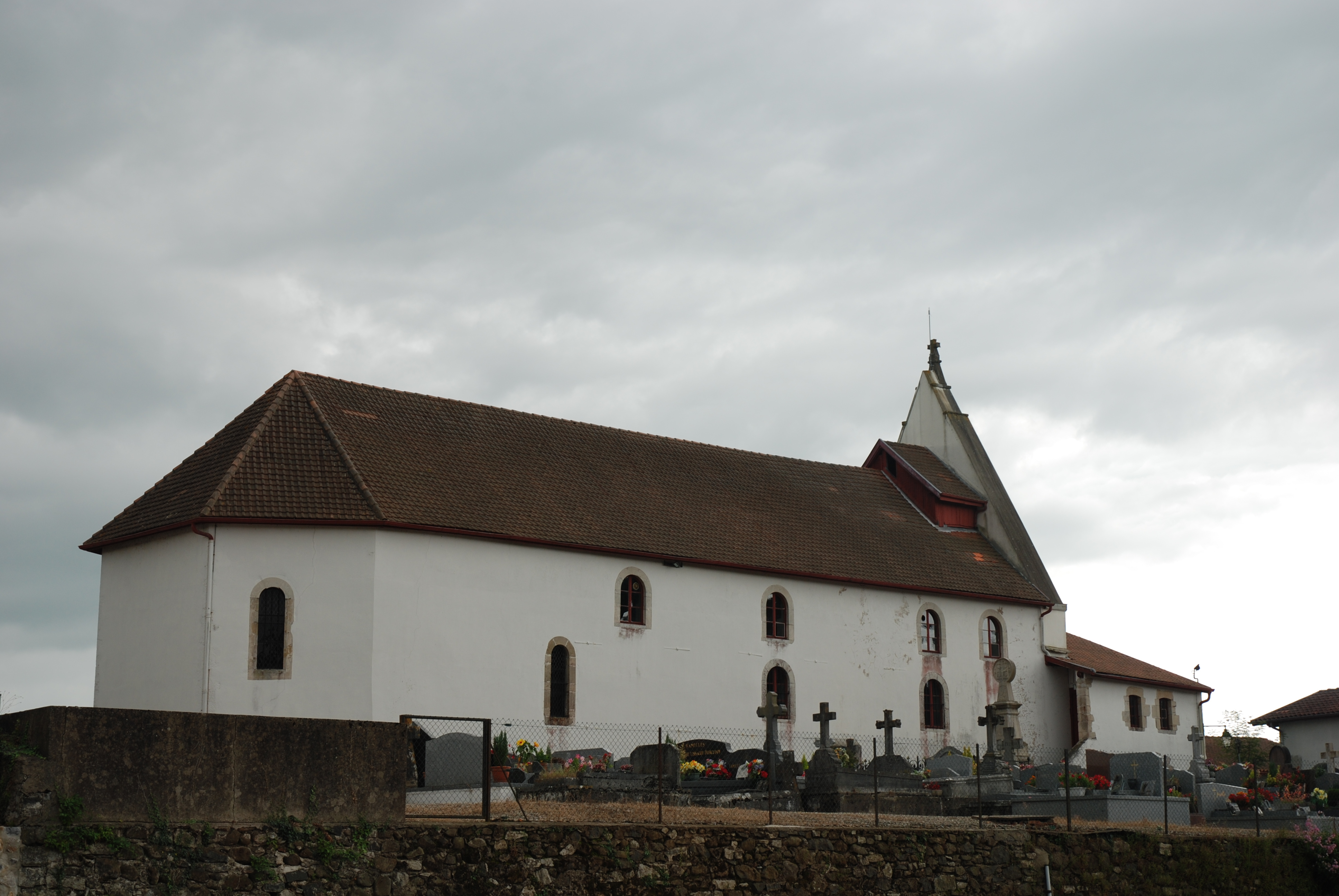
- The church of Saint-Jean-Baptiste

- Coat of arms
- Location of Villefranque
- Location within France Location within Nouvelle-Aquitaine
- Coordinates: 43°26′18″N 1°27′05″W
- Country: France
- Region: Nouvelle-Aquitaine
- Department: Pyrénées-Atlantiques
- Arrondissement: Bayonne
- Canton: Nive-Adour
- Intercommunality: CA Pays Basque

Government
  - Mayor (2020–2026): Marc Saint-Esteven
- Area^{1}: 17.17 km^{2} (6.63 sq mi)
- Elevation: 60 m (200 ft)
- Highest elevation: 131 m (430 ft)
- Lowest elevation: 0 m (0 ft)
- Population (2023): 3,069
  - Density: 178.7/km^{2} (462.9/sq mi)
- Time zone: UTC+01:00 (CET)
  - Summer (DST): UTC+02:00 (CEST)
- INSEE/Postal code: 64558 /64990
- ^{1} French Land Register data, which excludes lakes, ponds, glaciers > 1 km^{2} (0.386 sq mi or 247 acres) and river estuaries.

Villefranque (French pronunciation: [vilfʁɑ̃k]; Occitan: Vila Franca; Basque: Milafranga) is a commune in the Pyrénées-Atlantiques department in south-western France. It is part of the traditional Basque province of Labourd. Villefranque station has rail connections to Saint-Jean-Pied-de-Port, Cambo-les-Bains and Bayonne.

== Population ==
Historical population
Year	Pop.	±% p.a.
1968	1,029	—
1975	1,123	+1.26%
1982	1,375	+2.93%
1990	1,570	+1.67%
1999	1,742	+1.16%
2007	2,155	+2.70%
2012	2,370	+1.92%
2017	2,671	+2.42%
2023	3,069	+2.34%
Source: INSEE

== See also ==
- Communes of the Pyrénées-Atlantiques department
