= Niort station =

Railway station in Niort, France

Coordinates: 46°19′10″N 0°27′17″W

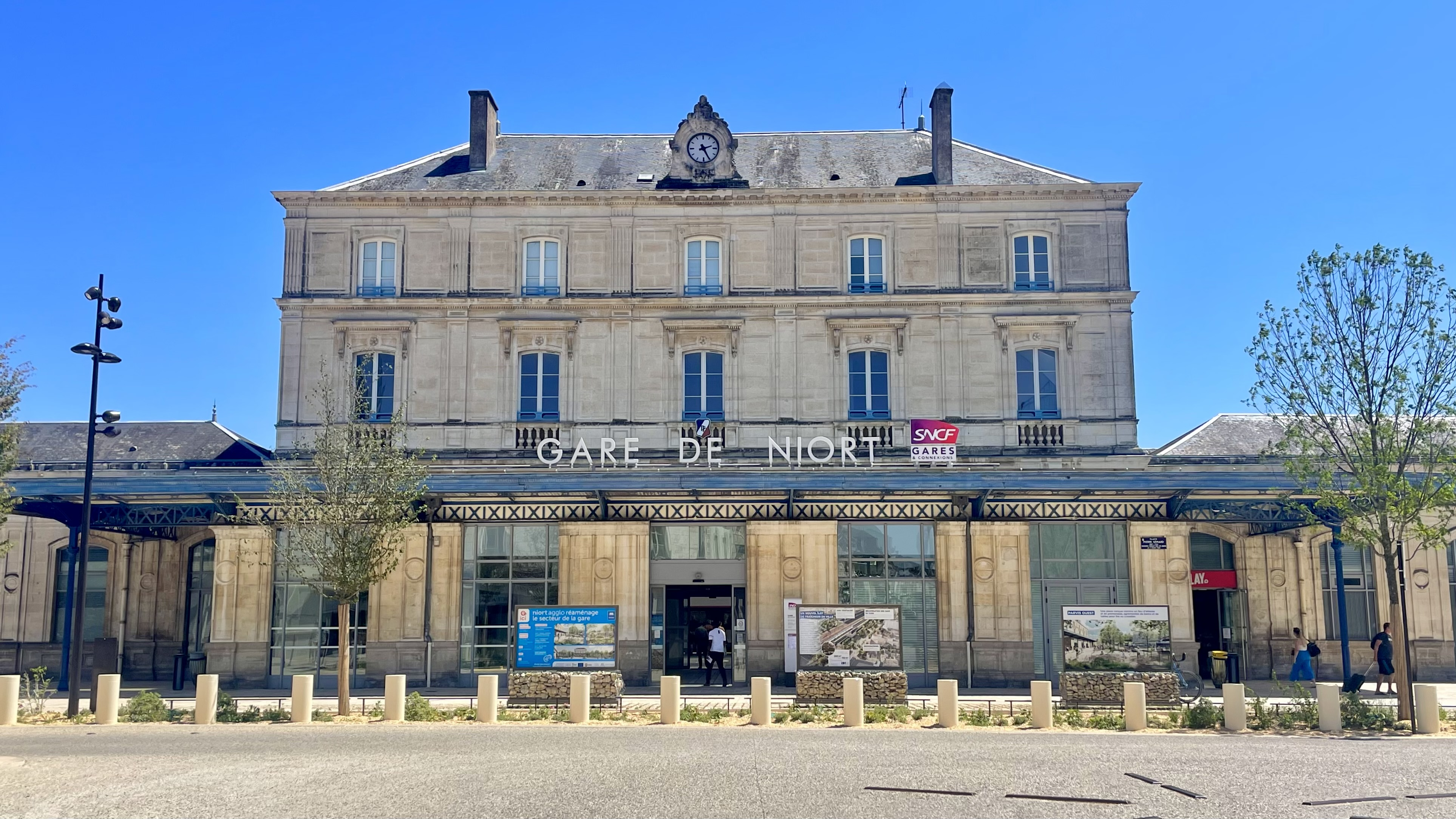
The station in 2025.

Niort is a railway station in Niort, France. Niort is linked to Paris and towns and cities in the region:

- Paris - La Rochelle (TGV Atlantique)
- La Rochelle - Niort - Poitiers (TER)
- Royan - Saintes - Niort (TER)

Preceding station	TER Nouvelle-Aquitaine	Following station
Prin-Deyrançon towards La Rochelle	14	La Crèche towards Poitiers
Terminus	17	Fors towards Royan
Preceding station	SNCF	Following station
Saint-Maixent towards Montparnasse	TGV	Surgères towards La Rochelle
