= Bidarray =

Bidarray Bidarrai
- Commune
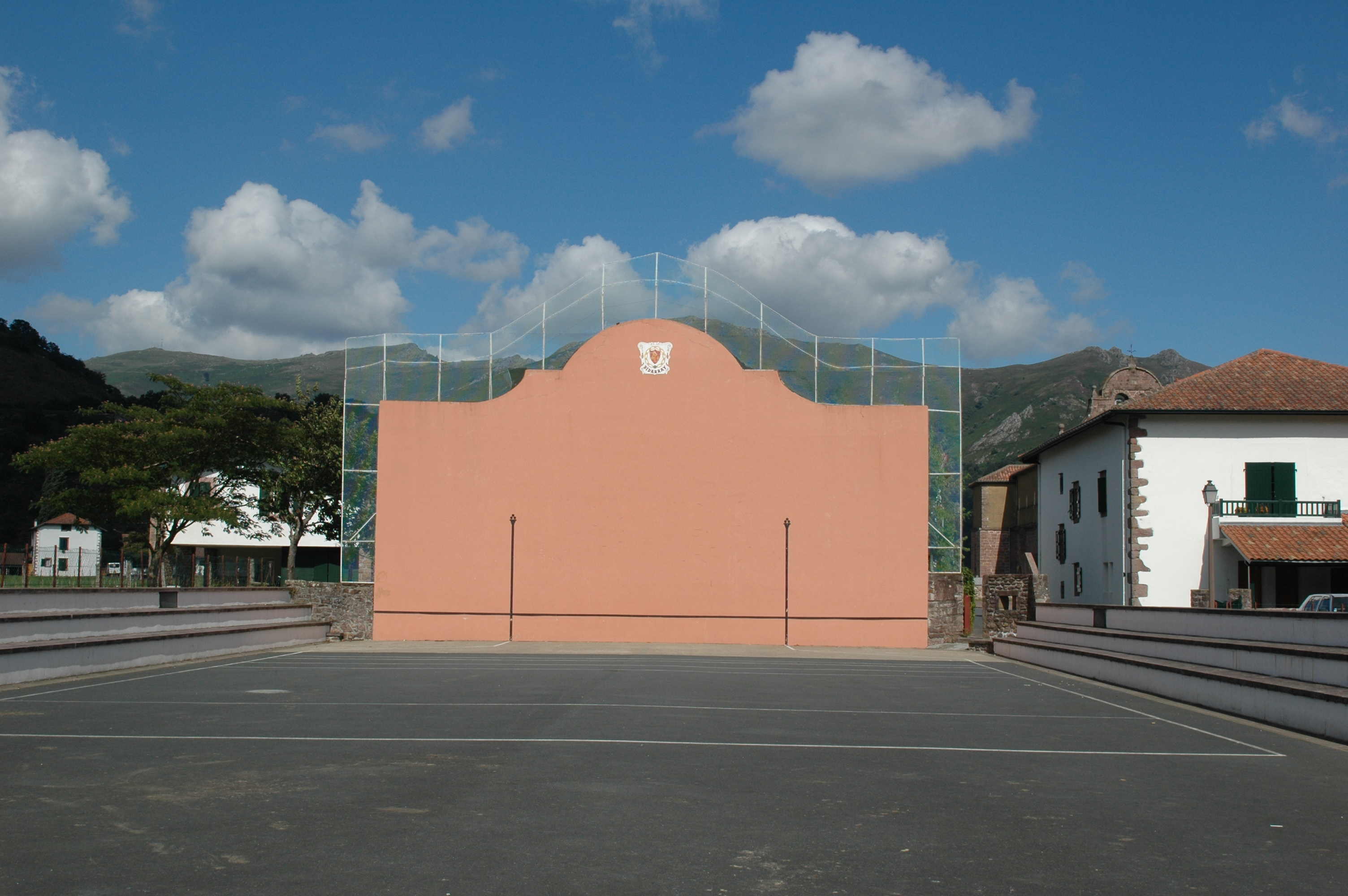
- Basque pelota

- Coat of arms
- Location of Bidarray
- Location within France Location within Nouvelle-Aquitaine
- Coordinates: 43°16′03″N 1°20′38″W
- Country: France
- Region: Nouvelle-Aquitaine
- Department: Pyrénées-Atlantiques
- Arrondissement: Bayonne
- Canton: Montagne Basque
- Intercommunality: CA Pays Basque

Government
  - Mayor (2020–2026): Jean-Michel Anchordoquy
- Area^{1}: 38.20 km^{2} (14.75 sq mi)
- Elevation: 120 m (390 ft)
- Highest elevation: 935 m (3,068 ft)
- Lowest elevation: 61 m (200 ft)
- Population (2023): 693
  - Density: 18.1/km^{2} (47.0/sq mi)
- Time zone: UTC+01:00 (CET)
  - Summer (DST): UTC+02:00 (CEST)
- INSEE/Postal code: 64124 /64780
- ^{1} French Land Register data, which excludes lakes, ponds, glaciers > 1 km^{2} (0.386 sq mi or 247 acres) and river estuaries.

Bidarray (French pronunciation: [bidaʁaj]; Basque: Bidarrai) is a commune of the Pyrénées-Atlantiques department in southwestern France. It is located in the former province of Lower Navarre. Bidarray-Pont-Noblia station has rail connections to Saint-Jean-Pied-de-Port, Cambo-les-Bains and Bayonne.

Located here is the Noblia bridge, a Roman bridge that spans the Nive. According to legend it was built by the Laminak or Sorginak (witches) in one night, earning it the nickname "the Bridge of Hell".

== Economy ==
The municipality is part of the production area for the Irouléguy vineyards. The activity is mainly agricultural. Bidarray is also part of the designation area for Ossau-Iraty cheese.

The purity of the waters of the Nive River has enabled the establishment of a fish farming activity. The river also allows for the practice of whitewater sports such as kayaking or rafting. A base has been established in the commune since 1991. Navigation is of moderate difficulty because most of its course consists of a succession of rapids and flat water stretches.

== See also ==
- Communes of the Pyrénées-Atlantiques department
