= Poitiers station =

Railway station in Poitiers, France

Poitiers
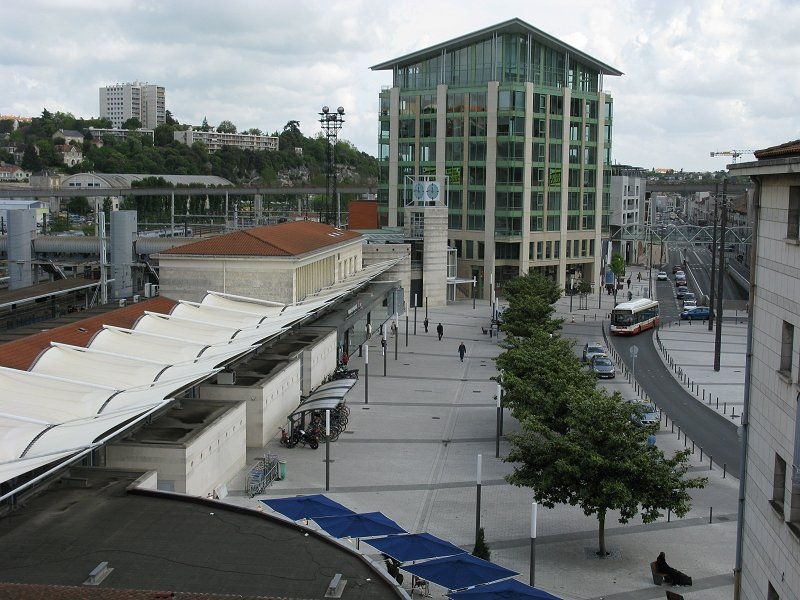
- The station looking north from the road side

General information
- Location: 2 boulevard Pont Achard; Poitiers; France
- Coordinates: 46.5822°N 0.3331°E
- Elevation: 82 m (269 ft)
- Owner: SNCF
- Operator: SNCF
- Lines: Paris–Bordeaux; Poitiers–Arçay

Other information
- Station code: 87575001

History
- Opened: 15 July 1851

Passengers
- 2024: 3,850,352
Services
Preceding station	SNCF	Following station
Futuroscope towards Montparnasse	TGV	Angoulême towards Bordeaux
Montparnasse Terminus	TGV	Saint-Maixent towards La Rochelle
Preceding station	Ouigo	Following station
Saint-Pierre-des-Corps towards Tourcoing	Grande Vitesse	Angoulême towards Bordeaux
Saint-Pierre-des-Corps towards Montparnasse	Grande Vitesse	Bordeaux Terminus
Preceding station	TER Nouvelle-Aquitaine	Following station
Chasseneuil towards Tours	11	Terminus
Terminus	12	Ligugé towards Angoulême
Lusignan towards La Rochelle	14	Terminus
Terminus	24	Mignaloux-Nouaillé towards Limoges
Location

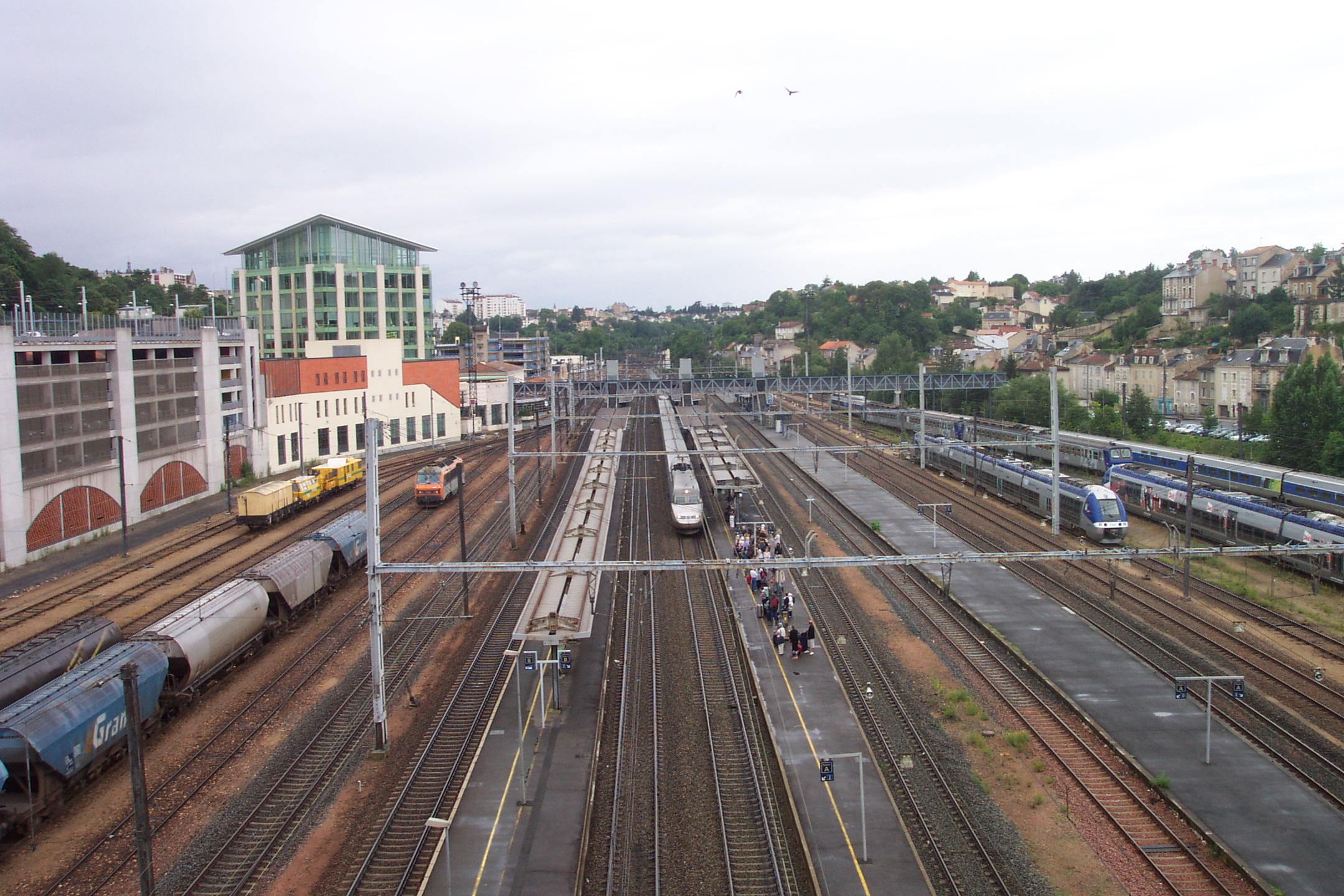
The station from a footbridge to the north of the station. The station building is to the left of centre, with its location indicated by the station footbridge.

Poitiers station (French: Gare de Poitiers) is a major railway station in the French city of Poitiers, in the department of Vienne and region of Nouvelle-Aquitaine. The station is situated on the Paris–Bordeaux railway. It was built in the 1850s.

== Services ==
A wide array of rail services serve Poitiers, including TGV Atlantique services from Paris Montparnasse to Bordeaux. Other rail services operate under the Transport express régional (TER) brand, and run from Poitiers to Angoulême, Tours, Limoges, Niort and La Rochelle. The station is also served by a TER bus service to Parthenay and Nantes.

== See also ==
- List of SNCF stations in Nouvelle-Aquitaine
