= La Rochelle station =

Railway station in La Rochelle, France

Coordinates: 46°9′10″N 1°8′44″W

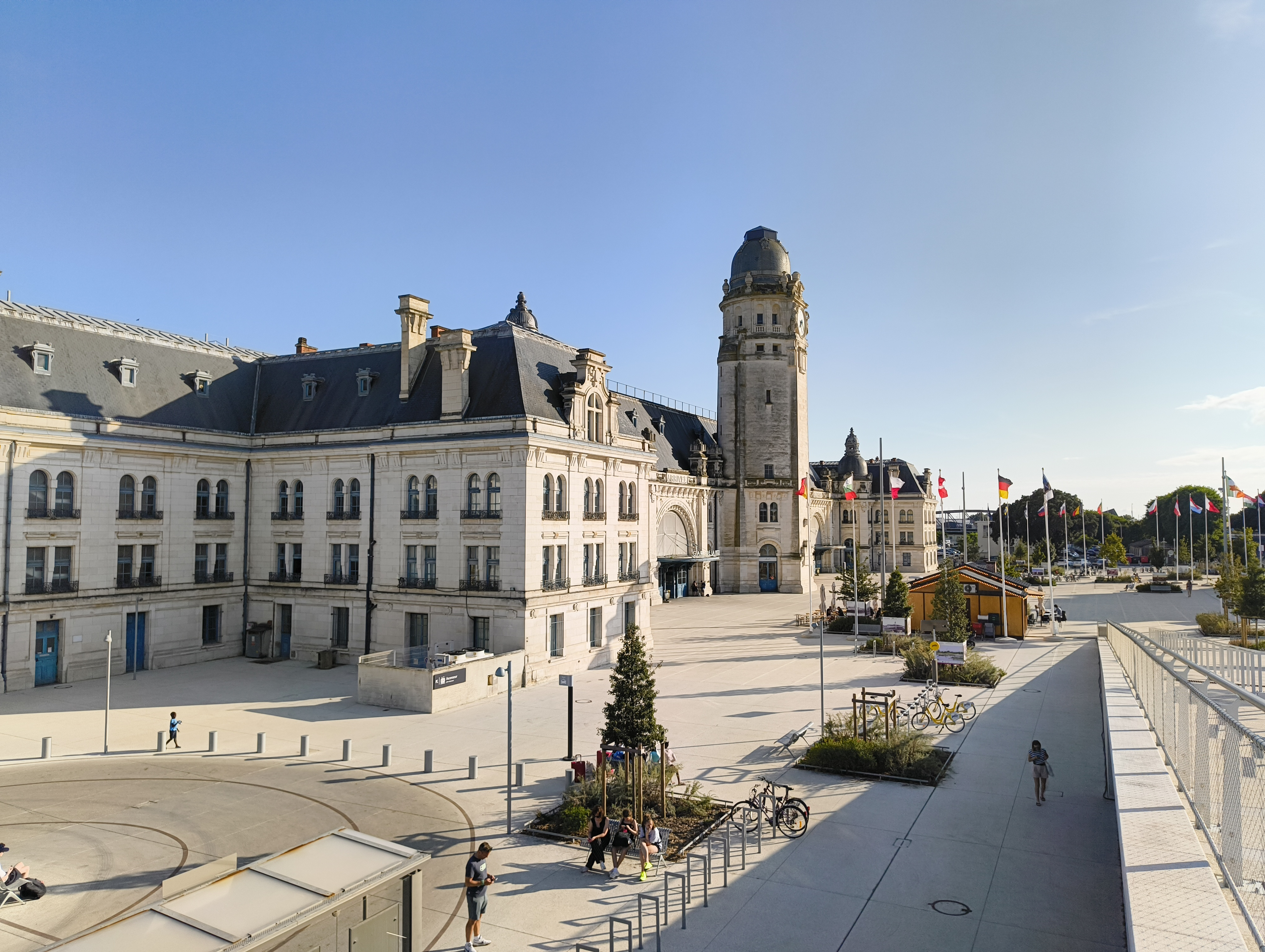
Station building in 2024

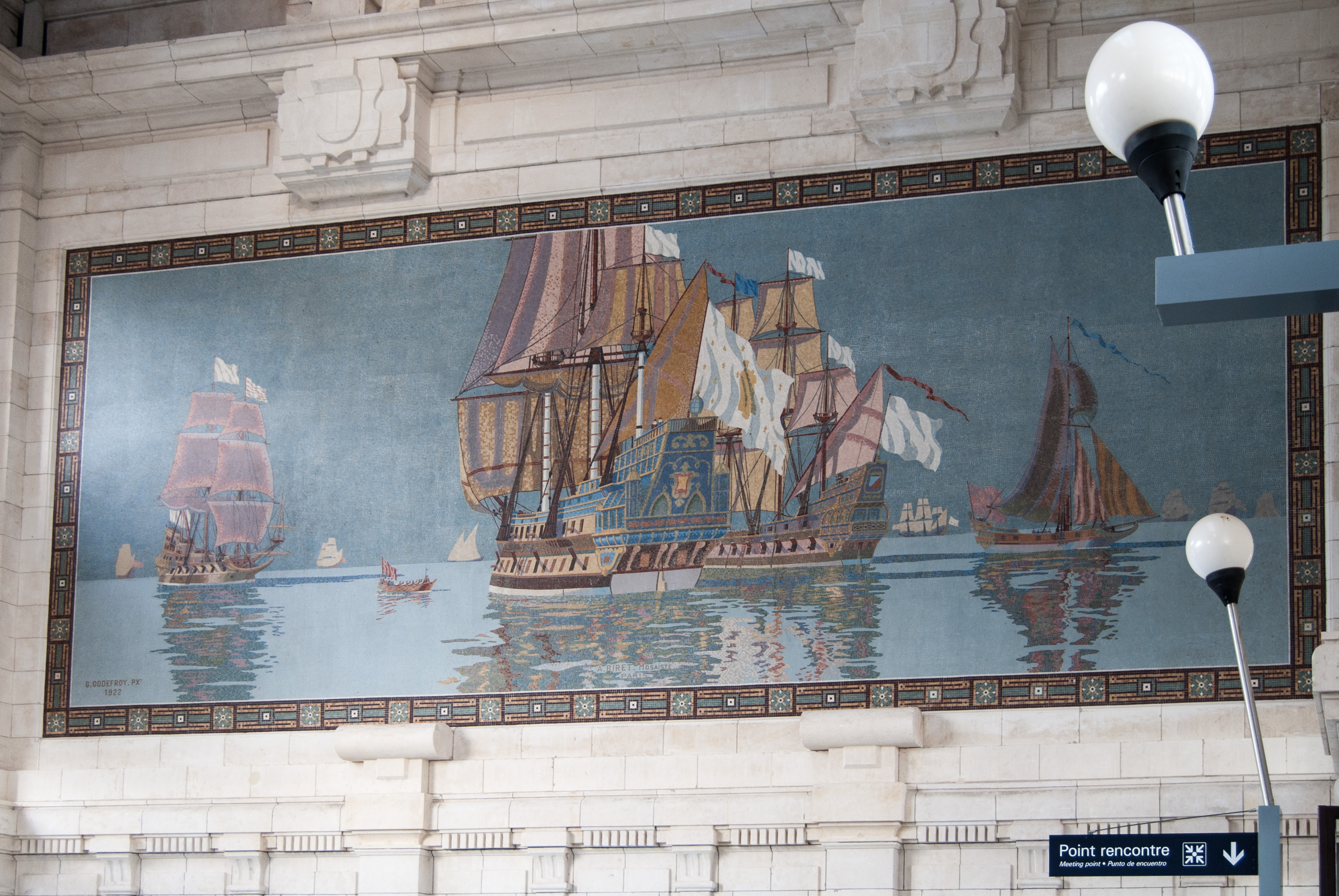
Mosaic in the hall

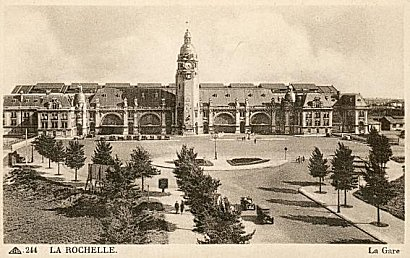
La Rochelle station in the early 20th century

La Rochelle ([la ʁɔʃɛl]; French: Gare de La Rochelle), formally La Rochelle-Ville (lit. 'La Rochelle-City'; [la ʁɔʃɛl vil]), is the main railway station of La Rochelle, France. The station building, which includes a 45-metre-tall clock tower and a large mosaic in its hall, was built in 1910–1922 by Pierre Esquié for the CF de l'État replacing the older building. The station was renovated by Franck Beck and Luc Mouret in the early 1990s for the arrival of the TGV Atlantique.

La Rochelle is linked to Poitiers, Tours, Bordeaux and Paris as well as regional (TER) services to other towns in Nouvelle-Aquitaine, such as Angoulême and Niort. There are both TGV and TER rail services serving La Rochelle station.

== Services ==
=== National services ===
The following national train services serve the station as of January 2021:

- TGV services Paris-Montparnasse – La Rochelle
- Intercity services (Intercités) Nantes – La Rochelle – Bordeaux

=== Services table ===
Preceding station	SNCF	Following station
Surgères towards Montparnasse	TGV	Terminus
Luçon towards Nantes	Intercités	Rochefort towards Bordeaux
Preceding station	TER Nouvelle-Aquitaine	Following station
Terminus	14	La Jarrie towards Poitiers
Terminus	15	Châtelaillon towards Bordeaux
La Rochelle-Porte Dauphine Terminus	15U	Aytré-Plage towards Rochefort
Preceding station	TER Pays de la Loire	Following station
Luçon towards Nantes	9	Terminus
