= Saint-Jean-Pied-de-Port station =

Railway station in Saint-Jean-Pied-de-Port, France

Coordinates: 43°10′02″N 1°14′17″W

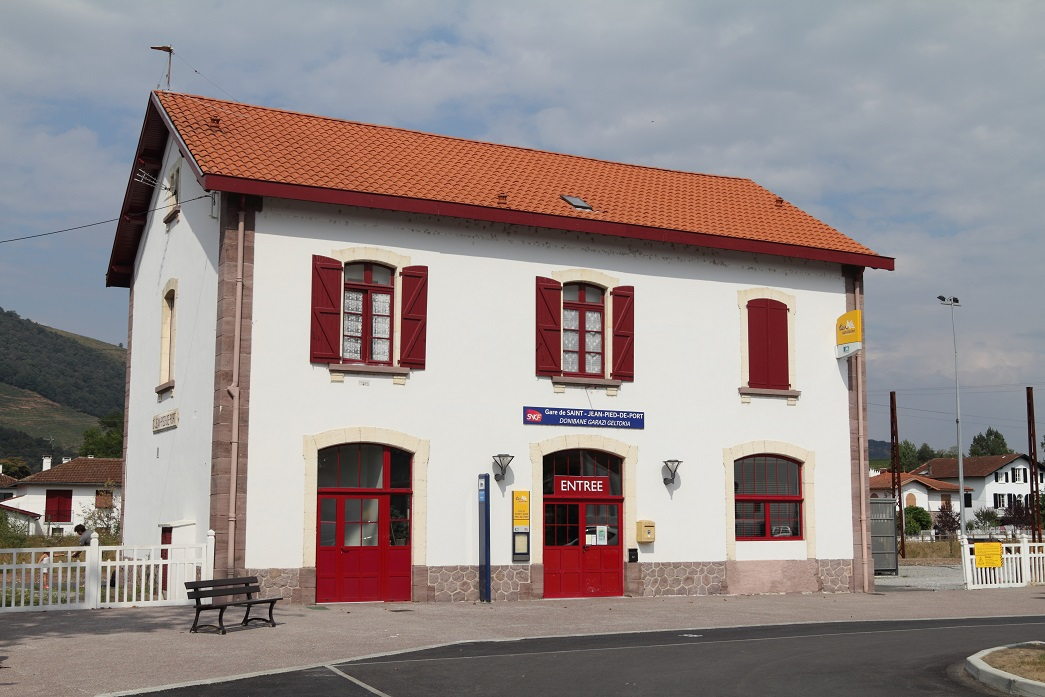
Saint-Jean-Pied-de-Port station

Saint-Jean-Pied-de-Port or Donibane Garazi is a railway station in Saint-Jean-Pied-de-Port, Nouvelle-Aquitaine, France. The station was opened in 1898 and is located at the end of the Bayonne - Saint-Jean-Pied-de-Port railway line. The station is served by TER (local) services operated by the SNCF.

== Train services ==
The following services currently call at Saint-Jean-Pied-de-Port:

- local service (TER Nouvelle-Aquitaine) Bayonne - Saint-Jean-Pied-de-Port

| Preceding station | TER Nouvelle-Aquitaine | Following station |
|---|---|---|
| Ossès-Saint-Martin-d'Arrossa towards Bayonne | 54 | Terminus |
