= Bayonne–Saint-Jean-Pied-de-Port railway =

Railway line in France

Coordinates: 43.3732°N 1.4161°W

Bayonne - Saint-Jean-Pied-de-Port railway
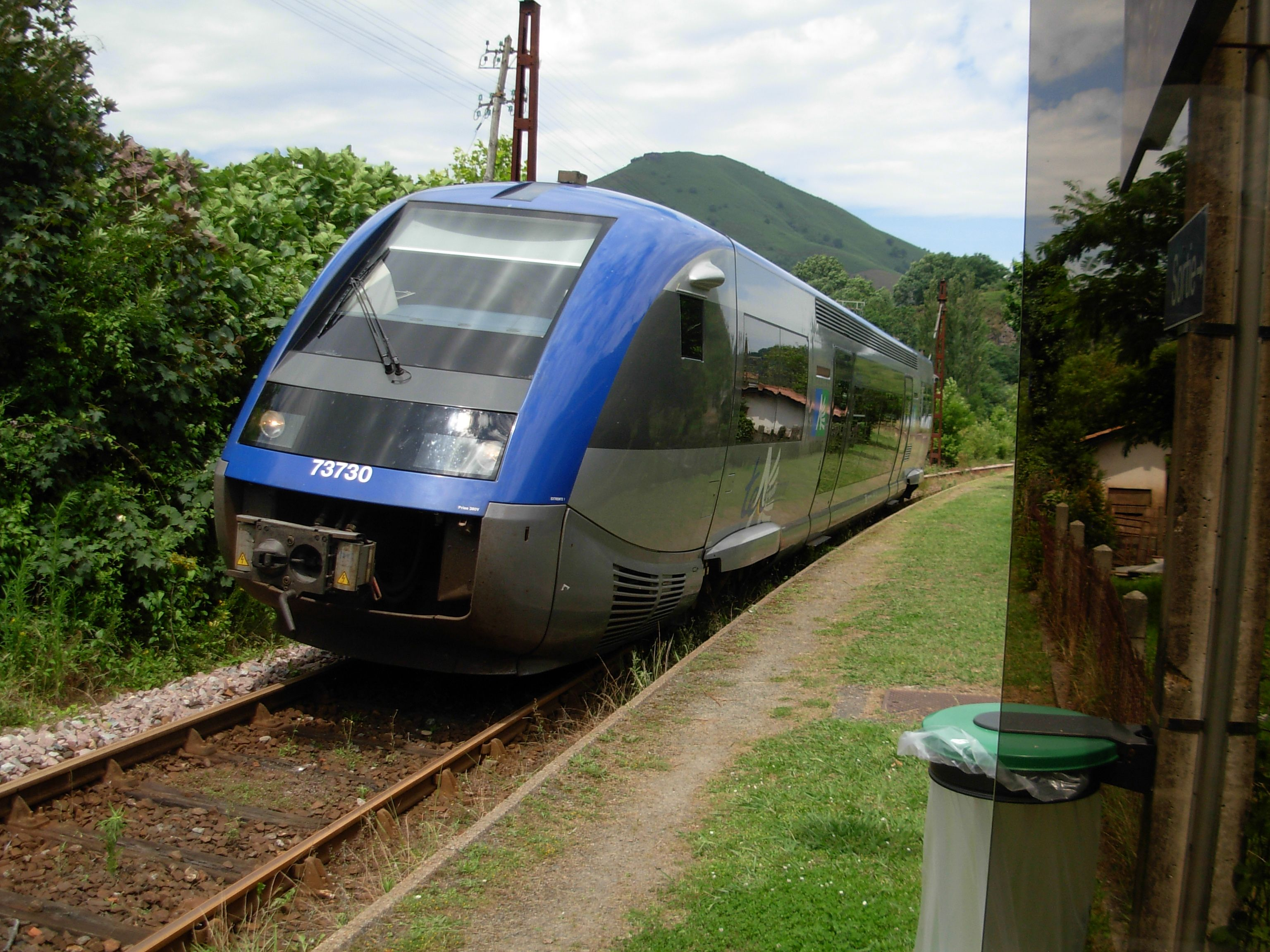
- A train on the line in 2011.

Overview
- Status: Operational
- Owner: RFF
- Locale: France (Nouvelle-Aquitaine)
- Termini: Bayonne station; Saint-Jean-Pied-de-Port station

Service
- System: SNCF
- Operator(s): SNCF

History
- Opened: 1891 - 1898

Technical
- Line length: 52 km (32 mi)
- Number of tracks: Single track
- Track gauge: 1,435 mm (4 ft 8 1/2 in) standard gauge
- Electrification: 1.5 kV DC

The Bayonne - Saint-Jean-Pied-de-Port railway is a French 52-kilometre long railway line, that connects the Bayonne to Saint-Jean-Pied-de-Port, running through the foothills of the Pyrenees. The railway was opened fully in 1898.

== Route ==
Map of the line in 2013

The Bayonne - Saint-Jean-Pied-de-Port railway leaves the Bayonne station in a southerly direction. It crosses the river Adour south of Bayonne town centre, and then splits with the Toulouse-Bayonne railway and Bordeaux-Irun railway. It continues through valleys within the Pyrenees until it reaches Saint-Jean-Pied-de-Port station, its south-eastern terminus.

== History ==
The line opened in 3 sections between 1891 and 1898 as follows:

- Bayonne - Cambo-les-Bains on 19 January 1891
- Cambo-les-Bains - Ossès on 20 August 1892
- Ossès - Saint-Jean-Pied-de-Port on 11 December 1898

Between 1930 and 1931 the line was electrified to 1.5 kV DC, however in May 2010 the line was de-electrified to reduce the costs of renewing the electrical equipment.

As of 2014 no trains run south from Cambo-les-Bains and a rail replacement bus service is used from this station onwards to SJPP. The rails are rusty and there are weeds growing up between the crossties. The line hugs a river valley and in places is only 20 feet above the Nive river. At one point, where the line crosses the river on a truss bridge, the ballast has been washed away over a distance of about 30 feet and the rail and crossties are suspended in mid-air. There is a collection of driftwood at this point; evidence of flood damage (probably at this location: 43.256303, -1.320315).

The line was reopened on November 22, 2015.

== Services ==
The Bayonne - Saint-Jean-Pied-de-Port railway is used by the following passenger services:

- TER Nouvelle-Aquitaine regional services between Bayonne and Saint-Jean-Pied-de-Port
