= TER Nouvelle-Aquitaine =

Regional train network in France

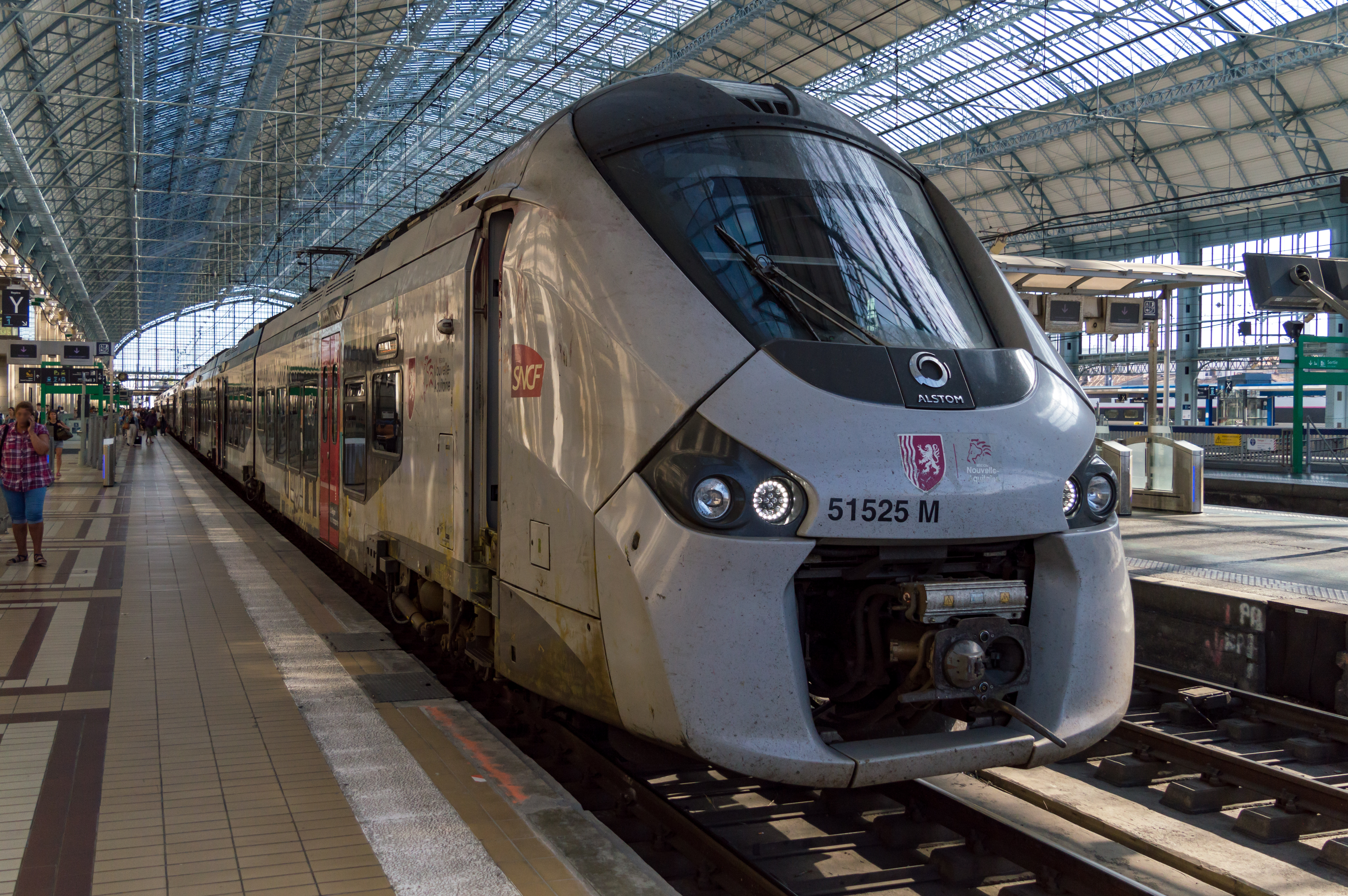
- A Z 51500 in Bordeaux-Saint-Jean station.

Overview
- Service type: Regional express
- Locale: Nouvelle-Aquitaine
- Predecessor: TER Aquitaine, TER Limousin, TER Poitou-Charentes
- First service: 2017
- Current operator: SNCF Voyageurs
- Ridership: 105,000 / day (2024)
- Website: TER Nouvelle-Aquitaine

Route
- Stops: 309

TER Nouvelle-Aquitaine is the regional rail network serving the region of Nouvelle-Aquitaine, southwestern France. It is operated by the French national railway company SNCF. It was formed in 2017 from the previous TER networks TER Aquitaine, TER Limousin and TER Poitou-Charentes, after the respective regions were merged.

== History ==
The merger of the three administrative regions of Aquitaine, Limousin and Poitou-Charentes took place on 16 January 2015, according to the changes to the law on the delimitation of regions. However, TER Nouvelle-Aquitaine, which brought together the former TER Aquitaine, TER Limousin and TER Poitou-Charentes networks, started in 2017.

In September 2018, the Nouvelle-Aquitaine region opposed the SNCF policy of running trains without a conductor as the former wanted conductors to be present on trains to avoid fraud and sell tickets.

== Network ==
3,600 kilometres of rail lines cover the Nouvelle-Aquitaine region (including 249 kilometres of the LGV Sud Europe Atlantique which connects the LGV Atlantique to Bordeaux). There are 308 stations and stopping points. The region is criss-crossed by TGV, Intercités, TER lines.

Rail transport infrastructure map of Nouvelle-Aquitaine, showing main stations, number of tracks, power source and maximum speed.

The towns served by TER trains are summarized in the table below. On several lines, trains are complemented by buses. As these services are taken up by the table in the next section, the table does not take them into account. The rail and bus network as of January 2021:

=== Rail ===
Line	Characteristics						Images
10	BRESSUIRE ↔ Thouars ↔ SAUMUR						
	Distance; 155.8 km	Duration; 0 h 55	No. Stops; 4	Evening / Sunday - Holidays /	Times; 5 h 57 - 20 h 45	Network; TER Nouvelle-Aquitaine	
11	POITIERS ↔ Châtellerault ↔ TOURS						
	Distance; 155.8 km	Duration; 1 h 15	No. Stops; 18	Evening / Sunday - Holidays /	Times; 5 h 55 - 19 h 49	Network; TER Nouvelle-Aquitaine / TER Centre-Val de Loire	
12	POITIERS ↔ Ruffec ↔ ANGOULÊME						
	Distance; 112.8 km	Duration; 1 h 08	No. Stops; 10	Evening / Sunday - Holidays /	Times; 6 h 11 - 19 h 45	Network; TER Nouvelle-Aquitaine	
13	BORDEAUX Saint-Jean ↔ Libourne ↔ Coutras ↔ ANGOULÊME						TER en gare de Libourne
	Distance; 134.5 km	Duration; 1 h 46	No. Stops; 15	Evening / Sunday - Holidays /	Times; 5 h 58 - 18 h 58	Network; TER Nouvelle-Aquitaine	TER en gare de Libourne
14	POITIERS ↔ Niort ↔ LA ROCHELLE						
	Distance; 144.9 km	Duration; 1 h 40	No. Stops; 14	Evening / Sunday - Holidays /	Times; 6 h 00 - 19 h 36	Network; TER Nouvelle-Aquitaine	
15	BORDEAUX SAINT-JEAN ↔ Saintes ↔ LA ROCHELLE						
	Distance; 168.7 km	Duration; 2 h 18	No. Stops; 18	Evening / Sunday - Holidays /	Times; 5 h 54 - 20 h 40	Network; TER Nouvelle-Aquitaine	
15U	ROCHEFORT ↔ LA ROCHELLE PORTE DAUPHINE						
	Distance; 31.65 km	Duration; 0 h 36	No. Stops; 7	Evening / Sunday - Holidays /	Times; 5 h 44 - 20 h 43	Network; TER Nouvelle-Aquitaine	
16	ANGOULÊME ↔ Saintes ↔ ROYAN						
	Distance; 114.4 km	Duration; 1 h 35	No. Stops; 8	Evening / Sunday - Holidays /	Times; 5 h 50 - 21 h 42	Network; TER Nouvelle-Aquitaine	
17	NIORT ↔ Saintes ↔ ROYAN						
	Distance; 111.12 km	Duration; 2 h 05	No. Stops; 12	Evening / Sunday - Holidays /	Times; 5 h 55 - 19 h 26	Network; TER Nouvelle-Aquitaine	
18	ANGOULÊME ↔ Saint-Junien ↔ LIMOGES-BÉNÉDICTINS						
	Distance; 118.8 km	Duration; 1 h 50	No. Stops; 13	Evening / Sunday - Holidays /	Times; 4 h 50 - 18 h 40	Network; TER Nouvelle-Aquitaine	
21	LIMOGES-BÉNÉDICTINS ↔ La Souterraine ↔ CHÂTEAUROUX						
	Distance; 137.1 km	Duration; 1 h 20	No. Stops; 15	Evening / Sunday - Holidays /	Times; 5 h 38 - 18 h 55	Network; TER Nouvelle-Aquitaine / TER Centre-Val de Loire	
22	LIMOGES-BÉNÉDICTINS ↔ Uzerche ↔ BRIVE-LA-GAILLARDE						
	Distance; 98.8 km	Duration; 1 h 14	No. Stops; 11	Evening / Sunday - Holidays /	Times; 6 h 02 - 20 h 14	Network; TER Nouvelle-Aquitaine	
23	LIMOGES-BÉNÉDICTINS ↔ Saint-Yrieix ↔ BRIVE-LA-GAILLARDE						
	Distance; 103.6 km	Duration; 2 h 00	No. Stops; 14	Evening / Sunday - Holidays /	Times; 5 h 20 - 19 h 10	Network; TER Nouvelle-Aquitaine	
24	POITIERS ↔ Bellac ↔ LIMOGES-BÉNÉDICTINS						
	Distance; 137.9 km	Duration; 1 h 50	No. Stops; 12	Evening / Sunday - Holidays /	Times; 5 h 34 - 20 h 14	Network; TER Nouvelle-Aquitaine	
25	LIMOGES-BÉNÉDICTINS ↔ Guéret ↔ Felletin ↔ MONTLUÇON-VILLE						
	Distance; 155.8 km	Duration; 2 h 05	No. Stops; 15	Evening / Sunday - Holidays /	Times; 5 h 38 - 18 h 55	Network; TER Nouvelle-Aquitaine	
26	LIMOGES-BÉNÉDICTINS ↔ Eymoutiers-Vassivière ↔ USSEL						
	Distance; 112.5 km	Duration; 2 h 10	No. Stops; 13	Evening / Sunday - Holidays /	Times; 5 h 33 - 21 h 14	Network; TER Nouvelle-Aquitaine	
27	BRIVE-LA-GAILLARDE ↔ Tulle ↔ USSEL						
	Distance; 93.4 km	Duration; 1 h 40	No. Stops; 11	Evening / Sunday - Holidays /	Times; 6 h 09 - 20 h 07	Network; TER Nouvelle-Aquitaine	
31	BORDEAUX Saint-Jean ↔ Périgueux ↔ Limoges-Bénédictins ↔ MONTLUÇON						
	Distance; 210.10 km	Duration; 2 h 24	No. Stops; 13	Evening / Sunday - Holidays /	Times; 6 h 07 - 22 h 00	Network; TER Nouvelle-Aquitaine	
32	BORDEAUX Saint-Jean ↔ Libourne ↔ Coutras ↔ Périgueux ↔ Brive-la-Gaillarde ↔ USSEL						Gare de Mussidan
	Distance; 128.2 km	Duration; 1 h 30	No. Stops; 16	Evening / Sunday - Holidays /	Times; 5 h 53 - 20 h 07	Network; TER Nouvelle-Aquitaine	Gare de Mussidan
33	BORDEAUX SAINT-JEAN ↔ Libourne ↔ Bergerac ↔ Le Buisson ↔ SARLAT-LA-CANÉDA						TER en gare de Bergerac
	Distance; 166.6 km	Duration; 2 h 30	No. Stops; 24	Evening / Sunday - Holidays /	Times; 6 h 14 - 18 h 16	Network; TER Nouvelle-Aquitaine	TER en gare de Bergerac
34	AGEN ↔ Monsempron-Libos ↔ PÉRIGUEUX / SARLAT						Gare du Buisson
	Distance; 152.0 km	Duration; 2 h 10	No. Stops; 18	Evening / Sunday - Holidays /	Times; 7 h 05 - 18 h 45	Network; TER Nouvelle-Aquitaine	Gare du Buisson
41.1U	BORDEAUX SAINT-JEAN ↔ Libourne ↔ COUTRAS						
	Distance km	Duration min	No. Stops	Evening / Sunday - Holidays /	Times	Network; TER Nouvelle-Aquitaine	
41.2U	BORDEAUX SAINT-JEAN ↔ Facture-Biganos ↔ Gujan-Mestras ↔ La Teste de Buch ↔ ARCACHON						Gare de La Teste
	Distance; 58.0 km	Duration; 55 min	No. Stops; 11	Evening / Sunday - Holidays /	Times; 5 h 16 - 22 h 10	Network; TER Nouvelle-Aquitaine	Gare de La Teste
42	BORDEAUX SAINT-JEAN ↔ Macau ↔ Lesparre-Médoc ↔ LE VERDON-SUR-MER [↔ La Pointe-de-Grave] and PESSAC ↔ MACAU						Z7336 en gare de Lesparre
	Distance; 99.8 km 24.2 km	Duration; 2 h 12; 31 min	No. Stops; 15; 8	Evening / Sunday - Holidays / /	Times; 5 h 42 - 21 h 10; 6 h 33 - 19 h 27	Network; TER Nouvelle-Aquitaine	Z7336 en gare de Lesparre
43.1U	BORDEAUX SAINT-JEAN ↔ St-André-de-Cubzac ↔ ST MARIENS-ST YZAN						Gare de St Mariens - St Yzan
	Distance; 168.7 km	Duration; 2 h 18	No. Stops; 18	Evening / Sunday - Holidays /	Times; 6 h 09 - 18 h 52	Network; TER Nouvelle-Aquitaine	Gare de St Mariens - St Yzan
43.2U	BORDEAUX SAINT-JEAN ↔ Beautiran ↔ LANGON						
	Distance	Duration	No. Stops	Evening / Sunday - Holidays /	Times	Network; TER Nouvelle-Aquitaine	
44	BORDEAUX SAINT-JEAN ↔ Langon ↔ Marmande ↔ AGEN						Gare de Marmande
	Distance; 135.5 km 70.4 km	Duration; 1 h 40	No. Stops; 25	Evening / Sunday - Holidays /	Times; 4 h 52 - 21 h 41	Network; TER Nouvelle-Aquitaine	Gare de Marmande
45	MONT-DE-MARSAN ↔ Morcenx ↔ BORDEAUX Saint-Jean						Gare de Mont-de-Marsan
	Distance; 147.0 km	Duration; 1 h 22	No. Stops; 9	Evening / Sunday - Holidays /	Times; 5 h 51 - 21 h 46	Network; TER Nouvelle-Aquitaine	Gare de Mont-de-Marsan
51	[Irun ↔] HENDAYE ↔ Bayonne ↔ Dax ↔ Morcenx ↔ BORDEAUX SAINT-JEAN						Gare de Dax
	Distance; 235.1 km	Duration; 2 h 40	No. Stops; 20	Evening / Sunday - Holidays /	Times; 6 h 31 - 18 h 48	Network; TER Nouvelle-Aquitaine	Gare de Dax
52; 53	BORDEAUX ↔ Dax ↔ Puyoô ↔ Pau ↔ Lourdes ↔ TARBES and BAYONNE ↔ Puyoô ↔ Pau ↔ Lourdes ↔ TARBES						Rame Z 7300 en gare d'Urt
	Distance; 233 km 165,1 km	Duration; 3 h 03; 2 h 15	No. Stops; 18; 14	Evening / Sunday - Holidays / /	Times; 5 h 05 - 21 h 13; 6 h 03 - 21 h 27	Network; TER Nouvelle-Aquitaine / TER Occitanie	Rame Z 7300 en gare d'Urt
54	BAYONNE ↔ SAINT JEAN PIED DE PORT						Deux TER en gare de Bayonne
	Distance; 52.0 km	Duration; 1 h 18	No. stops 11	Evening / Sunday - Holidays /	Times; 6 h 05 - 18 h 41	Network; TER Nouvelle-Aquitaine	Deux TER en gare de Bayonne
54U	BAYONNE ↔ CAMBO-LES-BAINS						
	Distance km	Duration	No. Stops	Evening / Sunday - Holidays /	Times	Network; TER Nouvelle-Aquitaine	
55	PAU ↔ BEDOUS						Gare d'Oloron-Sainte-Marie
	Distance; 59.0 km	Duration; 1 h 05	No. Stops; 10	Evening / Sunday - Holidays /	Times; 6 h 45 - 20 h 10	Network; TER Nouvelle-Aquitaine	Gare d'Oloron-Sainte-Marie

=== Bus ===
Line	Bus route
R1	Poitiers - Parthenay - Bressuire - Cholet - Nantes
R2	Thouars - Loudun - Chinon
R3	Angoulême - Pons
R7	Limoges - Uzerche - Tulle
R9	Limoges - Aubusson - Felletin
R12	Ussel - Auzances - Montluçon
R13	Ussel - Felletin - Aubusson - Montluçon
R15	La Souterraine - Guéret - Aubusson - Felletin
R16	Ussel - Bort-les-Orgues
R17	Felletin - Aubusson - Clermont-Ferrand
	Agen - Villeneuve-sur-Lot
	Dax - Puyoô - Mauléon
	Barbotan - Marmande
	Mont-de-Marsan - Barbotan - Agen
	Oloron-Sainte-Marie - Canfranc
	Agen - Aire-sur-l'Adour - Pau
	Mont-de-Marsan - Pau

== See also ==
- Réseau Ferré de France
- List of SNCF stations in Nouvelle-Aquitaine
